= List of prime ministers of Cambodia =

The prime minister of Cambodia (Khmer: នាយករដ្ឋមន្ត្រី, UNGEGN: Néayôk Rôdthâmôntrei, pronounced [niəjuək rɔəttʰamɔntrəj]; literally 'chief minister') is the head of government of the Kingdom of Cambodia. The prime minister is also the chairman of the Council of Ministers, and represents the government at home and abroad. Under the current constitution, the prime minister is elected to a five-year term, with no limits imposed on the office. Since 1945, there have been 37 prime ministers, including 4 who served in acting capacity.

Constitutionally the prime minister is required to be a member of the National Assembly. He must also gain their approval through a resolution before an official appointment by the King can take place. The traditional swearing-in ceremony takes place at the Royal Palace where the prime minister-elect has to take an oath of office in front of the King and the two Patriarch monks.

The current prime minister of Cambodia is Hun Manet, since 22 August 2023.

== List of officeholders ==
Political parties

Democratic Party
National Recovery Party
Sangkum
Khmer Serei
Social Republican Party
National United Front of Kampuchea
Communist Party of Kampuchea
Kampuchean People's Revolutionary Party → Cambodian People's Party
FUNCINPEC

Other factions

Military
Independent

| No. | Portrait | Name (Birth–Death) | Term of office | | | Party | Election | Cabinet | Head of state (Reign/Tenure) |
| No. | Portrait | Name (Birth–Death) | Took office | Left office | Time in office | Party | Election | Cabinet | Head of state (Reign/Tenure) |
Kingdom of Kampuchea (1945)
| 1 | | King; Norodom Sihanouk នរោត្តម សីហនុ (1922–2012) (Note: Ung Huy is by some sources considered to be Prime Minister rather than Sihanouk.) | 18 March 1945 | 13 August 1945 | 148 days | Independent | — | Sihanouk I | King; Norodom Sihanouk (1941–1955) |
| 2 | | Sơn Ngọc Thành សឹង ង៉ុក ថាញ់ (1908–1977) | 14 August 1945 | 16 October 1945 | 63 days | Independent | — | Thành I | King; Norodom Sihanouk (1941–1955) |
| French protectorate of Cambodia (1945–1953) | | | | | | | | | King; Norodom Sihanouk (1941–1955) |
| 3 | | Prince; Sisowath Monireth ស៊ីសុវត្ថិ មុន្នីរ៉េត (1909–1975) | 17 October 1945 | 15 December 1946 | 1 year, 59 days | Independent | — | Monireth | King; Norodom Sihanouk (1941–1955) |
| 4 | | Prince; Sisowath Youtevong ស៊ីសុវត្ថិ យុត្តិវង្ស (1913–1947) | 15 December 1946 | 17 July 1947 # | 214 days | Democratic | 1946 | Youtevong | King; Norodom Sihanouk (1941–1955) |
| 5 | | Prince; Sisowath Watchayavong ស៊ីសុវត្ថិ វឌ្ឍឆាយាវង្ស (1891–1972) | 25 July 1947 | 20 February 1948 | 210 days | Democratic | — | Watchayavong | King; Norodom Sihanouk (1941–1955) |
| 6 | | Chhean Vam ឈាន វម (1916–2000) | 20 February 1948 | 14 August 1948 | 176 days | Democratic | 1947 | Vam | King; Norodom Sihanouk (1941–1955) |
| 7 | | Sâmdéch; Penn Nouth ប៉ែន នុត (1906–1985) | 15 August 1948 | 21 January 1949 | 159 days | Democratic | — | Nouth I | King; Norodom Sihanouk (1941–1955) |
| 8 | | Yem Sambaur យ៉ែម សំបូរ (1913–1989) | 12 February 1949 | 20 September 1949 | 220 days | National Recovery Party | — | Sambaur I | King; Norodom Sihanouk (1941–1955) |
| 9 | | Ieu Koeus អៀវ កើស (1905–1950) | 20 September 1949 | 29 September 1949 | 9 days | Democratic | — | Koeus | King; Norodom Sihanouk (1941–1955) |
| (8) | | Yem Sambaur យ៉ែម សំបូរ (1913–1989) | 29 September 1949 | 28 April 1950 | 211 days | National Recovery Party | — | Sambaur II | King; Norodom Sihanouk (1941–1955) |
| (1) | | King; Norodom Sihanouk នរោត្តម សីហនុ (1922–2012) | 28 April 1950 | 30 May 1950 | 32 days | Independent | — | Sihanouk II | King; Norodom Sihanouk (1941–1955) |
| 10 | | Prince; Sisowath Monipong ស៊ីសុវត្ថិ មុនីពង្ស (1912–1956) | 30 May 1950 | 3 March 1951 | 277 days | Independent | — | Monipong | King; Norodom Sihanouk (1941–1955) |
| 11 | | Oum Chheang Sun អ៊ុំ ឈាងស៊ុន (1900–1963) | 3 March 1951 | 12 October 1951 | 223 days | Democratic | — | Sun I | King; Norodom Sihanouk (1941–1955) |
| 12 | | Huy Kanthoul ហ៊ុយ កន្ធុល (1909–1991) | 13 October 1951 | 15 June 1952 | 246 days | Democratic | 1951 | Kanthoul | King; Norodom Sihanouk (1941–1955) |
| (1) | | King; Norodom Sihanouk នរោត្តម សីហនុ (1922–2012) | 15 June 1952 | 24 January 1953 | 223 days | Independent | — | Sihanouk III | King; Norodom Sihanouk (1941–1955) |
| (7) | | Sâmdéch; Penn Nouth ប៉ែន នុត (1906–1985) | 24 January 1953 | 9 November 1953 | 289 days | Democratic | — | Nouth II | King; Norodom Sihanouk (1941–1955) |
| Kingdom of Cambodia / State of Cambodia (1953–1970) | | | | | | | | | King; Norodom Sihanouk (1941–1955) |
| (7) | | Sâmdéch; Penn Nouth ប៉ែន នុត (1906–1985) | 9 November 1953 | 22 November 1953 | 13 days | Democratic | — | Nouth II | King; Norodom Sihanouk (1941–1955) |
| 13 | | Chan Nak ចាន់ ណាក់ (1892–1954) | 23 November 1953 | 7 April 1954 | 135 days | Independent | — | Nak | King; Norodom Sihanouk (1941–1955) |
| (1) | | King; Norodom Sihanouk នរោត្តម សីហនុ (1922–2012) | 7 April 1954 | 18 April 1954 | 11 days | Independent | — | Sihanouk IV | King; Norodom Sihanouk (1941–1955) |
| (7) | | Sâmdéch; Penn Nouth ប៉ែន នុត (1906–1985) | 18 April 1954 | 26 January 1955 | 283 days | Democratic | — | Nouth III | King; Norodom Sihanouk (1941–1955) |
| 14 | | Leng Ngeth ឡេង ង៉ែត (1900–1975) | 26 January 1955 | 25 September 1955 | 242 days | Democratic | — | Ngeth | King; Norodom Sihanouk (1941–1955) |
| 14 | | Leng Ngeth ឡេង ង៉ែត (1900–1975) | 26 January 1955 | 25 September 1955 | 242 days | Democratic | — | Ngeth | King; Norodom Suramarit (1955–1960) |
| (1) | | Prince; Norodom Sihanouk នរោត្តម សីហនុ (1922–2012) | 25 September 1955 | 4 January 1956 | 101 days | Sangkum | 1955 | Sihanouk V | King; Norodom Suramarit (1955–1960) |
| (11) | | Oum Chheang Sun អ៊ុំ ឈាងស៊ុន (1900–1963) | 4 January 1956 | 29 February 1956 | 56 days | Sangkum | — | Sun II | King; Norodom Suramarit (1955–1960) |
| (1) | | Prince; Norodom Sihanouk នរោត្តម សីហនុ (1922–2012) | 1 March 1956 | 24 March 1956 | 23 days | Sangkum | — | Sihanouk VI | King; Norodom Suramarit (1955–1960) |
| 15 | | Khim Tit ឃឹម ទិត (1896–1975) | 3 April 1956 | 29 July 1956 | 117 days | Sangkum | — | Tit | King; Norodom Suramarit (1955–1960) |
| (1) | | Prince; Norodom Sihanouk នរោត្តម សីហនុ (1922–2012) | 15 September 1956 | 15 October 1956 | 30 days | Sangkum | — | Sihanouk VII | King; Norodom Suramarit (1955–1960) |
| 16 | | San Yun សាន យន់ (1905–1974) | 25 October 1956 | 7 April 1957 | 164 days | Sangkum | — | Yun | King; Norodom Suramarit (1955–1960) |
| (1) | | Prince; Norodom Sihanouk នរោត្តម សីហនុ (1922–2012) | 7 April 1957 | 7 July 1957 | 91 days | Sangkum | — | Sihanouk VIII | King; Norodom Suramarit (1955–1960) |
| 17 | | Sim Var ស៊ឹម វ៉ា (1906–1989) | 26 July 1957 | 11 January 1958 | 169 days | Sangkum | — | Var I | King; Norodom Suramarit (1955–1960) |
| 18 | | Ek Yi Oun ឯក យីអ៊ុន (1910–2013) | 11 January 1958 | 16 January 1958 | 5 days | Sangkum | — | Oun | King; Norodom Suramarit (1955–1960) |
| (7) | | Sâmdéch; Penn Nouth ប៉ែន នុត (1906–1985) | 16 January 1958 | 24 April 1958 | 98 days | Sangkum | — | Nouth IV | King; Norodom Suramarit (1955–1960) |
| (17) | | Sim Var ស៊ឹម វ៉ា (1906–1989) | 24 April 1958 | 12 July 1958 | 79 days | Sangkum | 1958 | Var II | King; Norodom Suramarit (1955–1960) |
| (1) | | Prince; Norodom Sihanouk នរោត្តម សីហនុ (1922–2012) | 12 July 1958 | 12 April 1960 | 1 year, 275 days | Sangkum | — | Sihanouk IX | King; Norodom Suramarit (1955–1960) |
| (1) | | Prince; Norodom Sihanouk នរោត្តម សីហនុ (1922–2012) | 12 July 1958 | 12 April 1960 | 1 year, 275 days | Sangkum | — | Sihanouk IX | Prince; Norodom Sihanouk (1960–1970) |
| 19 | | Pho Proeung ផូ ព្រឿង (1903–1975) | 18 April 1960 | 16 January 1961 | 273 days | Independent | — | Proeung I Proeung II | Prince; Norodom Sihanouk (1960–1970) |
| (7) | | Sâmdéch; Penn Nouth ប៉ែន នុត (1906–1985) | 28 January 1961 | 17 November 1961 | 293 days | Sangkum | — | Nouth V | Prince; Norodom Sihanouk (1960–1970) |
| (1) | | Prince; Norodom Sihanouk នរោត្តម សីហនុ (1922–2012) | 17 November 1961 | 13 February 1962 | 88 days | Sangkum | — | Sihanouk X | Prince; Norodom Sihanouk (1960–1970) |
| — | | General; Nhiek Tioulong ញឹក ជូឡុង (1908–1996); Acting | 13 February 1962 | 6 August 1962 | 174 days | Sangkum | — | Sihanouk X | Prince; Norodom Sihanouk (1960–1970) |
| — | | Sâmdéch; Chau Sen Cocsal Chhum ចៅ សែនកុសល (1905–2009); Acting | 6 August 1962 | 6 October 1962 | 61 days | Sangkum | — | Sihanouk X | Prince; Norodom Sihanouk (1960–1970) |
| 20 | | Prince; Norodom Kantol នរោត្តម កន្តុល (1920–1976) | 6 October 1962 | 25 October 1966 | 4 years, 19 days | Sangkum | 1962 | Kantol | Prince; Norodom Sihanouk (1960–1970) |
| 21 | | Marshal; Lon Nol លន់ នល់ (1913–1985) | 25 October 1966 | 1 May 1967 | 188 days | Sangkum / Military | 1966 | Nol I | Prince; Norodom Sihanouk (1960–1970) |
| 22 | | Sâmdéch; Son Sann សឺន សាន (1911–2000) | 1 May 1967 | 31 January 1968 | 275 days | Sangkum | — | Sann | Prince; Norodom Sihanouk (1960–1970) |
| (7) | | Sâmdéch; Penn Nouth ប៉ែន នុត (1906–1985) | 31 January 1968 | 14 August 1969 | 1 year, 195 days | Sangkum | — | Nouth VI | Prince; Norodom Sihanouk (1960–1970) |
| (21) | | Marshal; Lon Nol លន់ នល់ (1913–1985) (Note: In January 1970, Sisowath Sirik Matak was acting Prime Minister.) (Note: While Lon Nol was Prime Minister, he was only in charge of military affairs, while his deputy Sisowath Sirik Matak was in charge of administrative and diplomatic affairs.) | 14 August 1969 | 9 October 1970 | 1 year, 56 days | Sangkum (Note: Independent from 18 March 1970.) / Military | — | Nol II | Prince; Norodom Sihanouk (1960–1970) |
| (21) | | Marshal; Lon Nol លន់ នល់ (1913–1985) | 14 August 1969 | 9 October 1970 | 1 year, 56 days | Sangkum / Military | — | Nol II | Cheng Heng (1970–1972) |
| Khmer Republic (1970–1975) | | | | | | | | | Cheng Heng (1970–1972) |
| (21) | | Marshal; Lon Nol លន់ នល់ (1913–1985) (Note: State affairs were managed by Sisowath Sirik Matak.) (Note: Despite Lon Nol's resignation, he was on paper still Prime Minister until c. 27 June 1971.) | 9 October 1970 | 20 April 1971 | 193 days | Military | — | Nol II | Cheng Heng (1970–1972) |
| — | | Prince; Sisowath Sirik Matak ស៊ីសុវត្ថិ សិរិមតៈ (1914–1975) (Note: Acting from 11 March 1971 until c. 20 April 1971.) | 11 March 1971 | c. 20 April 1971 | c. 40 days | Military | — | Nol II | Cheng Heng (1970–1972) |
| 23 | | Prince; Sisowath Sirik Matak ស៊ីសុវត្ថិ សិរិមតៈ (1914–1975) | c. 20 April 1971 | 18 March 1972 | c. 333 days | Military | — | Matak | Cheng Heng (1970–1972) |
| 23 | | Prince; Sisowath Sirik Matak ស៊ីសុវត្ថិ សិរិមតៈ (1914–1975) | c. 20 April 1971 | 18 March 1972 | c. 333 days | Military | — | Matak | President; Lon Nol (1972–1975) |
| (2) | | Sơn Ngọc Thành សឹង ង៉ុក ថាញ់ (1908–1977) | 18 March 1972 | 15 October 1972 | 211 days | Khmer Serei | — | Thành II | President; Lon Nol (1972–1975) |
| 24 | | Hang Thun Hak ហង្ស ធុនហាក់ (1926–1975) | 15 October 1972 | 6 May 1973 | 203 days | PRS | 1972 | Hak | President; Lon Nol (1972–1975) |
| 25 | | In Tam អ៊ិន តាំ (1916–2006) | 6 May 1973 | 9 December 1973 | 217 days | Democratic | — | Tam | President; Lon Nol (1972–1975) |
| 26 | | Long Boret ឡុង បូរ៉េត (1933–1975) | 26 December 1973 | 17 April 1975 (executed) | 1 year, 112 days | PRS | — | Boret | President; Lon Nol (1972–1975) |
Kampuchea / Democratic Kampuchea (1975–1979)
| (7) | | Sâmdéch; Penn Nouth ប៉ែន នុត (1906–1985) | 17 April 1975 | 4 April 1976 | 353 days | FUNK | — | Nouth VII | Prince; Norodom Sihanouk (1975–1976) |
| — | | Khieu Samphan ខៀវ សំផន (born 1931); Acting | 4 April 1976 | 14 April 1976 | 10 days | CPK | — | Nouth VII | Prince; Norodom Sihanouk (1975–1976) |
| — | | Khieu Samphan ខៀវ សំផន (born 1931); Acting | 4 April 1976 | 14 April 1976 | 10 days | CPK | — | Nouth VII | Khieu Samphan (1976–1979) |
| 27 | | Pol Pot ប៉ុល ពត (1925–1998) | 14 April 1976 | 27 September 1976 | 166 days | CPK | 1976 | Pot I | Khieu Samphan (1976–1979) |
| — | | Nuon Chea នួន ជា (1926–2019); Acting | 27 September 1976 | 25 October 1976 | 28 days | CPK | — | Pot I | Khieu Samphan (1976–1979) |
| (27) | | Pol Pot ប៉ុល ពត (1925–1998) | 25 October 1976 | 7 January 1979 | 2 years, 74 days | CPK | — | Pot II | Khieu Samphan (1976–1979) |
Kampuchean People's Revolutionary Council Government / People's Republic of Kampuchea / State of Cambodia (1979–1992)
| Office vacant: 8 January 1979 – 27 June 1981 | | | | | | | | | Heng Samrin (1979–1992) |
| 28 | | Pen Sovann ប៉ែន សុវណ្ណ (1936–2016) | 27 June 1981 | 5 December 1981 | 161 days | KPRP | 1981 | Sovan | Heng Samrin (1979–1992) |
| — | | Chan Sy ចាន់ ស៊ី (1932–1984) | 5 December 1981 | 11 February 1982 | 68 days | KPRP | — | Sovan | Heng Samrin (1979–1992) |
| 29 | | Chan Sy ចាន់ ស៊ី (1932–1984) | 11 February 1982 | 26 December 1984 # | 2 years, 319 days | KPRP | — | Sy | Heng Samrin (1979–1992) |
| — | | Sâmdéch; Hun Sen ហ៊ុន សែន (born 1952) (Note: During a short time on 26 December 1984, the office was vacant.) | 26 December 1984 | 14 January 1985 | 19 days | KPRP CPP | — | Sy | Heng Samrin (1979–1992) |
| 30 | | Sâmdéch; Hun Sen ហ៊ុន សែន (born 1952) | 14 January 1985 | 28 February 1992 | 7 years, 45 days | KPRP CPP | — | Sen I | Heng Samrin (1979–1992) |
UN–administered Cambodia (1992–1993)
| (30) | | Sâmdéch; Hun Sen ហ៊ុន សែន (born 1952); Prime Minister (1992–1993) Second Prime Minister (1993) | 28 February 1992 | 24 September 1993 | 1 year, 208 days | CPP | — | Sen I Ranariddh/Sen | Heng Samrin (1979–1992) Chea Sim (1992–1993) Prince; Norodom Sihanouk (1993) |
| 31 | | Prince; Norodom Ranariddh នរោត្តម រណឫទ្ធិ (1944–2021); First Prime Minister | 2 July 1993 | 24 September 1993 | 84 days | FUNCINPEC | — | Ranariddh/Sen | Heng Samrin (1979–1992) Chea Sim (1992–1993) Prince; Norodom Sihanouk (1993) |
Kingdom of Cambodia (1993–present)
| (31) | | Prince; Norodom Ranariddh នរោត្តម រណឫទ្ធិ (1944–2021); First Prime Minister | 24 September 1993 | 6 August 1997 | 3 years, 316 days | FUNCINPEC | 1993 | Ranariddh/Sen | King; Norodom Sihanouk (1993–2004) |
| (30) | | Sâmdéch; Hun Sen ហ៊ុន សែន (born 1952); Second Prime Minister | 24 September 1993 | 30 November 1998 | 5 years, 67 days | CPP | 1993 | Ranariddh/Sen; Huot/Sen | King; Norodom Sihanouk (1993–2004) |
| 32 | | Ung Huot អ៊ឹង ហួត (born 1945); First Prime Minister | 6 August 1997 | 30 November 1998 | 1 year, 116 days | FUNCINPEC | — | Huot/Sen | King; Norodom Sihanouk (1993–2004) |
| (30) | | Sâmdéch; Hun Sen ហ៊ុន សែន (born 1952) | 30 November 1998 | 22 August 2023 | 24 years, 265 days | CPP | 1998 | Sen II | King; Norodom Sihanouk (1993–2004) |
| (30) | | Sâmdéch; Hun Sen ហ៊ុន សែន (born 1952) | 30 November 1998 | 22 August 2023 | 24 years, 265 days | CPP | 2003 | Sen III | King; Norodom Sihanouk (1993–2004) |
| (30) | | Sâmdéch; Hun Sen ហ៊ុន សែន (born 1952) | 30 November 1998 | 22 August 2023 | 24 years, 265 days | CPP | 2003 | Sen III | King; Norodom Sihamoni (since 2004) |
| (30) | | Sâmdéch; Hun Sen ហ៊ុន សែន (born 1952) | 30 November 1998 | 22 August 2023 | 24 years, 265 days | CPP | 2008 | Sen IV | King; Norodom Sihamoni (since 2004) |
| (30) | | Sâmdéch; Hun Sen ហ៊ុន សែន (born 1952) | 30 November 1998 | 22 August 2023 | 24 years, 265 days | CPP | 2013 | Sen V | King; Norodom Sihamoni (since 2004) |
| (30) | | Sâmdéch; Hun Sen ហ៊ុន សែន (born 1952) | 30 November 1998 | 22 August 2023 | 24 years, 265 days | CPP | 2018 | Sen VI | King; Norodom Sihamoni (since 2004) |
| 33 | | Sâmdéch; Hun Manet ហ៊ុន ម៉ាណែត (born 1977) | 22 August 2023 | Incumbent | 3 years, 63 days | CPP | 2023 | Manet | King; Norodom Sihamoni (since 2004) |

== See also ==
- Monarchy of Cambodia
- List of heads of state of Cambodia
- Prime Minister of Cambodia
- List of de facto leaders of the People's Republic of Kampuchea
