= Cabinet of Sisowath Monireth =

Cabinet of Sisowath Morireth
- 3rd Cabinet of Cambodia
- Date formed: 17 October 1945
- Date dissolved: 14 December 1946

People and organisations
- Monarch: Norodom Sihanouk
- Commissioner: Paul Huard; Romain Victor Joseph Pénavaire
- Prime Minister: Sisowath Monireth
- Total no. of members: 7

History
- Outgoing formation: 1946 Cambodian general election
- Predecessor: Thành I
- Successor: Youtevong

Following the restoration of French rule in Cambodia, Prince Sisowath Monireth was appointed Prime Minister and formed a cabinet in October 1945. This cabinet oversaw Cambodia gaining autonomy within French Union and the election of a Constituent Assembly in 1946. The cabinet resigned after the election to let leader of the winning Democratic Party, Prince Sisowath Youtevong, form a new cabinet.

The cabinet was composed of royalists and colonial bureaucrats, most of them had been ministers in the previous two cabinets. Despite Cambodia being a protectorate and not able to exercise independent foreign policy, Prince Monireth appointed his brother and future Prime Minister Prince Monipong as Minister of Foreign Affairs to show France that "Cambodia did retain some semblance of independence".

== Cabinet ==
Cabinet
Portfolio	Minister	Took office	Left office	Party	Ref
Prime Minister; Minister of Interior; Minister of National Defense	Sisowath Monireth	17 October 1945	14 December 1946	Independent	
Minister of Foreign Affairs and National Education	Sisowath Monipong	17 October 1945	14 December 1946	Independent	
Minister of Justice	Chan Nak	17 October 1945	14 December 1946	Independent	
Minister of Health, Public Works and Telecommunications	Khim Tit	17 October 1945	14 December 1946	Independent	
Minister of Cult, Buddhist Studies and Fine Arts	Sum Hieng	17 October 1945	14 December 1946	Independent	
Minister of National Economy	Var Kamel	17 October 1945	14 December 1946	Independent	
Minister of Finance	Nhiek Tioulong	17 October 1945	14 December 1946	Independent	

== Political parties ==
Although none of the ministers had any party affiliation, it was under this cabinet that political parties began to emerge in Cambodia following French approval in early 1946. Three political parties established and participated in the subsequent election: Democratic, Liberal and Progressive. In February 1946, ministers Khim Tit and Nhiek Tioulong failed to establish a "Socialist Party".

=== Liberal Party ===
The party established by Prince Norodom Norindeth was the first political party in Cambodian history. Supported by French administrator and former leader of the local Socialist Party branch Louis Manipoud, the party advocated a "superficial, unrealistic and overly pro-French" program, including liberalism, constitutional monarchy, universal suffrage and the retention of French judges and administrators. The party selected Meas Hell as president and Khouth Koeun as vice-president, both would be ministers later. Other notables of the party included Neal Phleng, Samson Fernandez and Vann Molyvann.

=== Democratic Party ===
The party was founded by supporters of Sơn Ngọc Thành: Sim Var, Ieu Koeus and Chhean Vam. They picked Sisowath Youtevong, a prince returning from France who had been in the Socialist Party, as party leader.The party then proceeded to recruit various personalities, including Huy Kanthoul, Penn Nouth, Sonn Voeunsai, Son Sann, Yem Sambaur, Sam Nhean and princes Sisowath Sirik Matak and Sisowath Essaro.

The party advocated a British-model constitutional monarchy and a unicameral parliament. It supported nationalisation of water, electricity production and transportation. It agreed Cambodian participation in French Union and called for the return of Thai-occupied territories, which was done in November 1946. The party obtained mass support and had always won the most seats in the National Assembly until the fraudulent election of 1955.

=== Progressive Party ===
The party was founded by Prince Norodom Montana, former Economy and Agriculture minister, under the name Khmer National Progressive Party (Khmer: ក្រុមចំរើនជាតិខ្មែរ) or Progressive Democratic Party (Khmer: គណបក្សប្រជាធិបតេយ្យជឿន, French: Parti démocrate-progressiste).. The party never obtained any seats in parliamentary elections. Two of its members, Au Chheun and Chea Chin Koc, would hold ministrial positions.
