= Cabinet of Sisowath Youtevong =

- 4th Cabinet of Cambodia
- Date formed: 15 December 1946
- Date dissolved: 24 July 1947

People and organisations
- Monarch: Norodom Sihanouk
- Commissioner: Romain Victor Joseph Pénavaire
- Prime Minister: Sisowath Youtevong
- Total no. of members: 12
- Member party: Democratic Party; Progressive Democratic Party

History
- Election: 1946 Cambodian general election
- Predecessor: Monireth
- Successor: Watchayavong

With the electoral victory of Democratic Party, party leader Prince Sisowath Youtevong was appointed Prime Minister and formed a cabinet with all but one party militants. The cabinet's term ended abruptly when Prime Minister Youtevong died in July 1947.

== Cabinet ==
Portfolio	Minister	Took office	Left office	Party	Ref
Prime Minister; Minister of Interior	Sisowath Youtevong	15 December 1946	17 July 1947	Democratic Party	
Minister of Justice	Sisowath Watchayavong	15 December 1946	24 July 1947	Democratic Party	
Minister of National Defense	Sonn Voeunsai	15 December 1946	24 July 1947	Democratic Party	
Minister of Finance	Son Sann	15 December 1946	24 July 1947	Democratic Party	
Minister of National Economy	Pen Samel	15 December 1946	24 July 1947	Democratic Party	
Minister of National Economy	Chhean Vam	15 December 1946	24 July 1947	Democratic Party	
Minister of Public Works, Telecommunications and Health	Brak Sarin	15 December 1946	24 July 1947	Democratic Party	
Senior Minister in charge of Phnom Penh Capital	Penn Nouth	15 December 1946	24 July 1947	Democratic Party	
Secretary of State for Information and Propaganda	Huy Kanthoul	15 December 1946	24 July 1947	Democratic Party	
Secretary of State for Finance	Hak Mong Seng	15 December 1946	24 July 1947	Democratic Party	
Secretary of State for Cult, Buddhist Studies and Fine Arts	Au Chheun	15 December 1946	24 July 1947	Progressive Democratic Party	
Secretary of State for Cult, Buddhist Studies and Fine Arts	Ouk Thoutch	15 December 1946	24 July 1947	Democratic Party	
