= Cabinet of Sisowath Watchayavong =

- 5th Cabinet of Cambodia
- Date formed: 25 July 1947
- Date dissolved: 20 February 1948

People and organisations
- Monarch: Norodom Sihanouk
- Commissioner: Léon Pignon
- Prime Minister: Sisowath Watchayavong
- Senior Minister: Penn Nouth
- Deputy Prime Minister: Son Sann
- Total no. of members: 12
- Member party: Democratic Party; National Union Party

History
- Incoming formation: Death of Sisowath Youtevong
- Outgoing formation: 1947 Cambodian general election
- Election: 1946 Cambodian general election
- Predecessor: Youtevong
- Successor: Vam

After the death of Prince Sisowath Youtevong, Minister of Justice Prince Sisowath Watchayavong was appointed Prime Minister and formed a cabinet, retaining most of the members in the Youtevong government. Following Democratic victory in the 1947 election, the cabinet resigned for a renewed Democratic cabinet.

== Cabinet ==
Cabinet
Portfolio	Minister	Took office	Left office	Party	Ref
Prime Minister; Minister of Justice	Sisowath Watchayavong	25 July 1947	20 February 1948	Democratic Party	
Deputy Prime Minister	Son Sann	25 July 1947	20 February 1948	Democratic Party	
Senior Minister	Penn Nouth	25 July 1947	20 February 1948	Democratic Party	
Minister of Interior	Au Chheun	25 July 1947	20 February 1948	National Union Party (Cambodia)	
Minister of Finance	Hak Mong Seng	25 July 1947	20 February 1948	Democratic Party	
Minister of National Defense	Sonn Voeunsai	25 July 1947	20 February 1948	Democratic Party	
Minister of National Economy	Pen Samel	25 July 1947	20 February 1948	Democratic Party	
Minister of Health, Public Works and Telecommunications	Brak Sarin	25 July 1947	20 February 1948	Democratic Party	
Minister of Cult and Fine Arts	Ouk Thoutch	25 July 1947	20 February 1948	Democratic Party	
Minister of Information and Social Affairs	Huy Kanthoul	25 July 1947	20 February 1948	Democratic Party	
