= 1951 Cambodian general election =

National election

- 9 September 1951

All 78 seats in the National Assembly 39 seats needed for a majority
	First party	Second party
Leader	Huy Kanthoul	Norodom Norindeth
Party	Democratic	Liberal
Last election	44 seats	21 seats
Seats won	54	18
Seat change	▲10	▼3
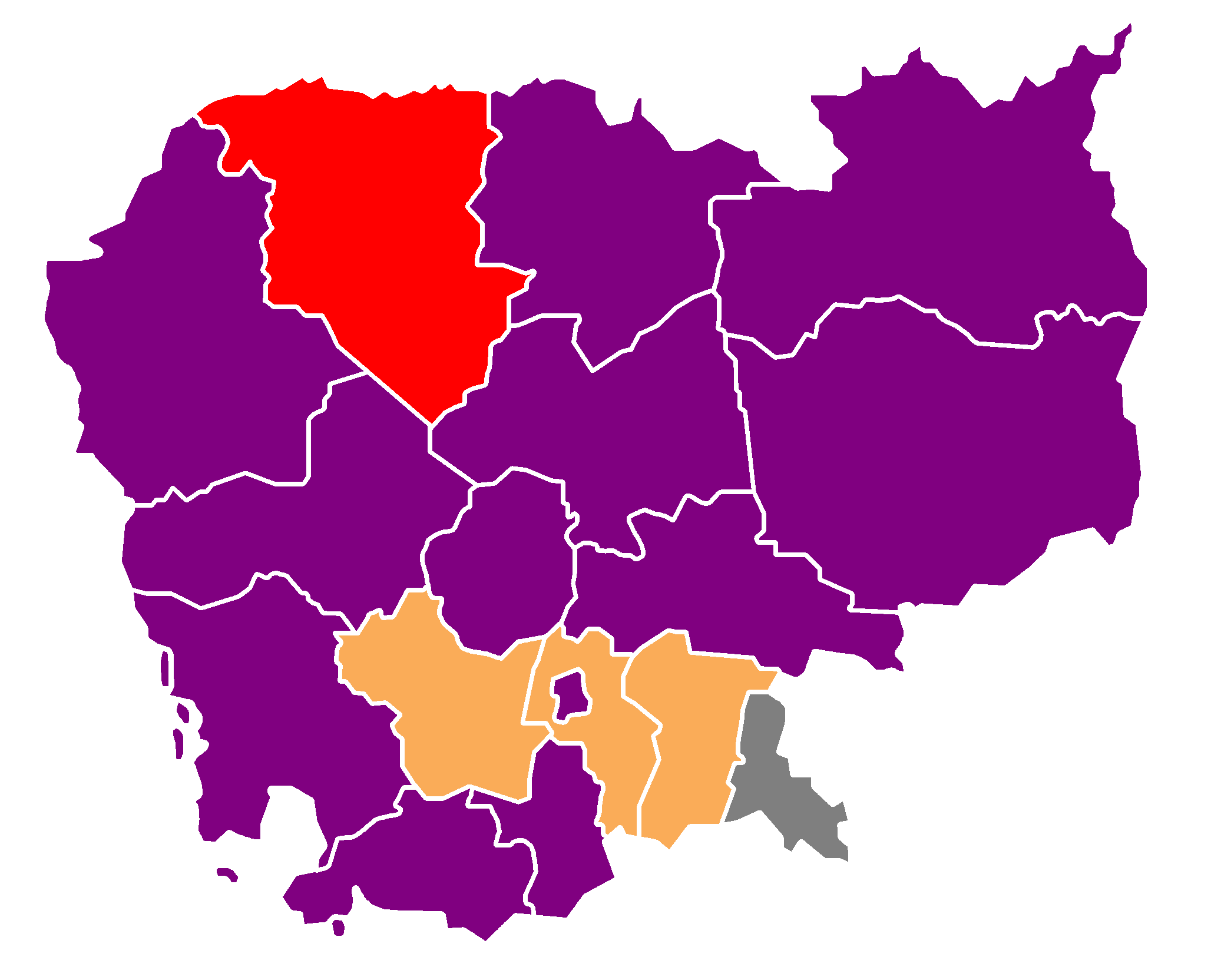
- Results by constituency Democratic Liberal VNEP
Prime Minister before election
Oum Chheang Sun
Democratic
Elected Prime Minister
Huy Kanthoul
Democratic

General elections were held in Cambodia on 9 September 1951. The Democratic Party won 54 of the 78 seats.

== Results ==
The National Recovery Party of former Prime Minister Yem Sambaur and the Democratic Progressive Party of Prince Norodom Montana failed to win seats.

Party	Seats	+/–
Democratic Party	54	+10
Liberal Party	18	–3
Victorious North-East Party	4	New
Khmer Renovation	2	New
Democratic Progressive Party	0	New
National Recovery Party	0	New
Independents	0	–10
Total	78	+3
Source: Nohlen et al., Cornfield
