= House of Sisowath =

Royal house of Cambodia

House of Sisowath រាជវង្សស៊ីសុវត្ថិ
- Parent house: Varman dynasty; House of Oudong
- Country: Cambodia
- Founded: 27 April 1904; 122 years ago
- Founder: Sisowath
- Current head: Currently inactive
- Final ruler: Sisowath Kossamak (Note: After the death of King Norodom Suramarit, his consort Queen Sisowath Kossamak served as monarch for ceremonial purposes only (as a "symbol, incarnation, and representative" of the dynasty), while the powers of head of state were delegated to her son Norodom Sihanouk, who was appointed "Chief of State" whose powers equal that of a monarch.)
- Titles: King of Cambodia; Queen of Cambodia
- Members: List
- Connected families: House of Norodom; Saloth family

The House of Sisowath (Khmer: រាជវង្សស៊ីសុវត្ថិ, UNGEGN: Réachôvôngs Sisŏvôtthĕ, ALA-LC: Rājavangs Sīsuvatthi [riəceaʔʋɔŋ siːsoʋat]; lit. 'Sisowath dynasty') is one of the two royal houses of Cambodia, alongside its counterpart, the House of Norodom. Both it and its sister house have a claim to the throne as descendants of King Ang Duong. Its members are the descendants of King Sisowath who reigned from 1904 to 1927. It was the ruling royal house from 1904 to 1941. It has produced three monarchs of Cambodia, and five prime ministers.

== Family tree ==
- Sisowath I (1840–1927)
  - Sisowath Essaravong (1858–1906)
    - Sisowath Yubhiphan (1877–1967)
    - Sisowath Rathary (1878–1946)
      - Sisowath Phineary
      - Sisowath Sorikanrattana
      - Sisowath Sirik Matak (1914–75)
        - Sisowath Chariya (born 1940)
          - Sisowath Charidy (born 1974)
            - Sisowath Rattana Tevi (born 2002)
            - Sisowath Kethana Devi (born 2007)
        - Sisowath Sirirath (born 1946)
          - Sisowath Noryvong Nikko (born 1992)
          - Sisowath Narita (born 1996)
      - Sisowath Methavy (1922–78)
        - Sisowath Thomico (born 1952)
      - Sisowath Essaro (1924–2004)
        - Sisowath Tesso
      - Sisowath Vitouriya (1927–78)
      - Sisowath Thonnika (1929–75)
      - Sisowath Virota (1932–75)
      - Sisowath Chuttima (1935–75)
    - Sisowath Sisura (1879–1927) married Sisowath Darameth
      - Sisowath Ritharavong (1935–75)
        - Sisowath Sararidh
    - Sisowath Chattivong (1887–1954)
  - Sisowath Duong Madhura (1863–)
  - Sisowath Monivong (1875–1941) married Norodom Kanviman Norleak Tevi (1876–1912)
    - Sisowath Monireth (1909–1975)
    - Sisowath Monipong (1912–1956)
      - Sisowath Samyl Monipong (1941)
      - Sisowath Pongsyria (1942–75)
      - Sisowath Lysa (1942–75)
      - Sisowath Monisisowath (1943–75)
      - Sisowath Moniringsy (1943)
      - Sisowath Sovethvong (1945–94)
      - Sisowath Pongneary (1947)
      - Sisowath Monisophea (1949–75)
      - Sisowath Duong Daravong (1950–74)
      - Sisowath Reymoni (1952–75)
      - Sisowath Siviman (1953–75)
      - Sylvia Sisowath (1954–75)
      - Sisowath Ponnirath (1956–75)
    - Sisowath Kossamak (1904–75) married Norodom Suramarit
      - Norodom Sihanouk
- Sisowath Chamraengvongs (1870–1916) married Sisowath Yubhiphan
  - Sisowath Youtevong (1913–47)
    - Sisowath Kantara (born 1945)
    - Sisowath Lenanda (born 1946)
- Sisowath Watchayavong (1891–1972)
- Sisowath Duong Lakheana
  - Sisowath Darameth
- Sisowath Narith (born 1964)
- Sisowath Yeun Vong (1918–2008)

== List of Sisowath monarchs ==
Portrait	Name	Reign		
Portrait	Name	From	To	Duration
	Sisowath ស៊ីសុវត្ថិ (b. 1840 – d. 1927)	27 April 1904	9 August 1927	23 years, 104 days
	Sisowath Monivong ស៊ីសុវត្ថិ មុនីវង្ស (b. 1875 – d. 1941)	9 August 1927	23 April 1941	13 years, 257 days
	Sisowath Monireth ស៊ីសុវត្ថិ មុន្នីរ៉េត (b. 1909– d. 1975); President of the Regency Council (Note: Other members of the Regency Council were Sisowath Kossamak and Norodom Sihanouk.)	6 April 1960 (Note: Monireth took the office on 6 April, however the Cambodian Crown Council already met on 4 April and decided that Monireth becomes the regent.)	13 June 1960	68 days
	Sisowath Kossamak ស៊ីសុវត្ថិ កុសមៈ (b. 1904 – d. 1975)	20 June 1960	9 October 1970	10 years, 111 days

== List of Sisowath consorts ==
Portrait	Name	Reign		
Portrait	Name	From	To	Duration
	Sisowath Kossamak ស៊ីសុវត្ថិ កុសមៈ (b. 1904 – d. 1975)	3 March 1955	3 April 1960	5 years, 31 days

== List of Sisowath prime ministers ==
Portrait	Name	In office			Party
Portrait	Name	From	To	Duration	Party
	Sisowath Monireth ស៊ីសុវត្ថិ មុនីរ៉េត (b. 1909 – d. 1975)	17 October 1945	15 December 1946	1 year, 59 days	Independent
	Sisowath Youtevong ស៊ីសុវត្ថិ យុត្តិវង្ស (b. 1913 – d. 1947)	15 December 1946	17 July 1947	214 days	Democratic
	Sisowath Watchayavong ស៊ីសុវត្ថិ វឌ្ឍឆាយាវង្ស (b. 1891 – d. 1972)	25 July 1947	20 February 1948	210 days	Democratic
	Sisowath Monipong ស៊ីសុវត្ថិ មុនីពង្ស (b. 1912 – d. 1956)	30 May 1950	3 March 1951	277 days	Independent
	Sisowath Sirik Matak ស៊ីសុវត្ថិ សិរិមតៈ (b. 1914 – d. 1975)	11 March 1971	18 March 1972	1 year, 7 days	FANK (ANK)
