= Khmer Renovation Party =

Khmer Renovation Party គណបក្សខេមរៈបុនក្ការ Parti de la rénovation khmère
- Leader: Sisowath Monipong
- General Secretary: Lon Nol
- Founder: Lon Nol; Nhiek Tioulong
- Founded: September 1947
- Dissolved: 1955
- Merged into: Sangkum
- Ideology: Khmer nationalism Monarchism; Conservatism
- Political position: Centre-right
- Religion: Theravada Buddhism

Khmer Renovation Party (Khmer: គណបក្សខេមរៈបុនក្ការ; French: Parti de la rénovation khmère), also translated as Khmer Renewal Party, was an anti-communist, nationalist and royalist political party founded in Cambodia in September 1947. In 1955, it became one of the core elements of the Sangkum political movement of the Prince Norodom Sihanouk.

The party is mainly significant because key members Lon Nol and Prince Sisowath Sirik Matak would go on to lead the right-wing coup of 1970 against Sihanouk and his Sangkum regime.

== History ==
The party was formed by the politician and soldier Nhiek Tioulong and police chief Lon Nol. Its nominal leader was the respected Prince Sisowath Monipong, one of the two sons of King Sisowath Monivong and one of the candidates for the throne passed over in favor of Sihanouk in 1941. Other prominent members included Chau Sen Cocsal Chhum, who advised Tioulong and Nol in founding the party, and Chuop Hell.

The party, known informally as the "Renos", had a socially conservative and royalist program - albeit far more pro-independence than that of the similarly conservative Liberal Party of Prince Norodom Norindeth - and attracted high-ranking bureaucrats and several members of the royal family as well as military officers. Khmer Renovation's "quasi-feudalist" perspective, which emphasized Cambodia and its monarchy's place in world history and the postcolonial order, was symbolized by its chosen symbol of the Earth Goddess superimposed on a map of the protectorate. It published a newspaper, Khmera or Rénovation, in both French and Khmer versions. Monipong was to become the Prime Minister of a 'unity' government between June 1950 and February 1951.

Lon Nol led the party to the polls in the 1951 elections, where - despite receiving 9.1% of the total vote - it won 2 seats in the Assembly. One of the elected was Leng Sarin.

Although the Khmer Renovation Party had only limited electoral success - neither Lon Nol nor Sirik Matak, later to become prominent politicians, won seats while a party member - it became one of the main political groupings behind the formation of the Sangkum of Prince Sihanouk. Nhiek Tioulong was to become Prime Minister under the Sangkum, and was later to become a prominent figure in the pro-royalist FUNCINPEC organization. Lon Nol was also to become Prime Minister but, along with Sirik Matak, was to lead the 1970 coup deposing Sihanouk and instigating the Khmer Republic.
