= Sim Var =

17th Prime Minister of Cambodia

- ស៊ឹម វ៉ា

Prime Minister of Cambodia
- In office 24 April 1958 – 10 July 1958
- Monarch: Norodom Suramarit
- Preceded by: Penn Nouth
- Succeeded by: Norodom Sihanouk
- In office 26 July 1957 – 11 January 1958
- Monarch: Norodom Suramarit
- Preceded by: Norodom Sihanouk
- Succeeded by: Ek Yi Oun

Cambodian Ambassador to Japan
- In office 1970–1974
- Appointed by: Lon Nol
- Succeeded by: Koun Wick

Minister for Foreign Affairs
- In office 1957–1958
- Succeeded by: Penn Nouth

Personal details
- Born: 2 February 1906 Kampong Cham, Cambodia, French Indochina
- Died: 12 October 1989 (aged 83) Paris, France
- Party: Democratic
- Spouse(s): Ma Prakob (m. 1962; div.); Yoko Kawada

Sim Var (Khmer: ស៊ឹម វ៉ា; 2 February 1906 – 12 October 1989) was a Cambodian politician. He served as Prime Minister of Cambodia from July 1957 to January 1958 and from April to July 1958. Together with Chhean Vam and Ieu Koeus, he co-founded the Democratic Party in April 1946. As a nationalist, Var opposed the French rule over Cambodia and led opposition movements with other nationalists. He was Cambodia's Ambassador to Japan during the 1970s.

== Background ==
Sim Var was born in 1906 in the Kompong Cham district of Tbuong Khmom (now a province) to a family of farmers. He was one of the first Cambodian nationalists. He co-founded the Democratic Party in 1946 alongside fellow nationalists Chhean Vam and Ieu Keous, with the purpose of leading a democratic movement against the French protectorate. He also co-founded the first newspaper in Cambodia in 1939 along with Pach Chheun and Son Ngoc Thanh, known as "Nokor Wat".

In February 1947, Var was under arrest along with 16 other Democrats by French authorities over accusations of being a member of a pro-Japanese group that opposes the French rule of Cambodia. He was sent to Prey Nokor for nine months from March to November 1947 and finally to Kompong Cham until his release in 1948. He became Prime Minister in 1957 and served just under one year until 1958 due to economic issues.

In 1962, he married Ma Prakob and gave birth to a son and a daughter. The couple formally divorced years later. He later served as Cambodia's envoy to Japan in the Lon Nol government and married a Japanese woman there, named Yoko Kawada. Var was believed to be involved in the coup that overthrew Norodom Sihanouk. He took refuge in Paris during the Khmer Rouge rule of Cambodia until his death on 12 October 1989 at the age of 83.

Political offices
Preceded by Norodom Sihanouk	Prime Minister of Cambodia; 1957–1958	Succeeded by Ek Yi Oun
Preceded by Penn Nouth	Prime Minister of Cambodia; 1958	Succeeded by Norodom Sihanouk
