= Oum Chheang Sun =

11th Prime Minister of Cambodia

- អ៊ុំ ឈាងស៊ុន

Prime Minister of Cambodia
- In office 5 January 1956 – 29 February 1956
- Monarch: Norodom Suramarit
- Preceded by: Norodom Sihanouk
- Succeeded by: Norodom Sihanouk
- In office 3 March 1951 – 12 October 1951
- Monarch: Norodom Sihanouk
- Preceded by: Sisowath Monipong
- Succeeded by: Huy Kanthoul

President of the Council of Kingdom
- In office January 1950 – February 1952
- Preceded by: Khuon Nay
- Succeeded by: Penn Nouth

Personal details
- Born: 1 June 1900 Kampong Cham, Cambodia, French Indochina
- Died: 1963 (aged 62–63)
- Party: Sangkum
- Other political affiliations: Democratic Party (Before 1955)

Oum Chheang Sun (Khmer: អ៊ុំ ឈាងស៊ុន; 1 June 1900 – 1963) was Prime Minister of Cambodia from March to October 1951, and again from January to February 1956.
