= 1947 Cambodian general election =

National election

- 21 December 1947

All 75 seats in the National Assembly 38 seats needed for a majority

	First party	Second party
Leader	Sisowath Watchayavong	Norodom Norindeth
Party	Democratic	Liberal
Last election	50 seats	14 seats
Seats won	44	21
Seat change	▼7	▲7
- Results by constituency
Prime Minister before election
Sisowath Watchayavong
Democratic
Elected Prime Minister
Chhean Vam
Democratic

General elections were held in Cambodia on 21 December 1947. The Democratic Party won 44 of the 75 seats.

== Results ==
Party	Seats	+/–
Democratic Party	44	–6
Liberal Party	21	+7
Independents	10	+7
Total	75	+8
Source: Nohlen et al.
