= Sisowath Pongneary Monipong =

Cambodian princess

Sisowath Pongneary Monipong ស៊ីសុវត្ថិ ពង្សនារី មុនីពង្ស
- Born: 29 May 1947 (age 79); Phnom Penh, Cambodia
- House: Sisowath
- Father: Sisowath Monipong
- Mother: Son Nary
- Religion: Theravada Buddhism
- Occupation: Member of the Supreme Privy Council to His Majesty the King; Member of the Constitutional Council

Styles of Sisowath Pongneary Monipong
- Reference style: Her Royal Highness
- Spoken style: Your Royal Highness

Sisowath Pongneary Monipong (Khmer: ស៊ីសុវត្ថិ ពង្សនារី មុនីពង្ស), is a Cambodian Princess who served as the Member of the Supreme Privy Council to His Majesty the King and the Member of the Constitutional Council of Cambodia.

== Biography ==
Her Royal Highness Samdech Sisowath Pongneary Monipong is the daughter of Samdech Krom Luong Sisowath Monipong and Neak Mneang Son Nary. Her Royal Highness was born on May 29, 1947, in Phnom Penh. Her official title is Her Royal Highness Samdech Sisowath Pongneary Monipong (Khmer: សម្តេច ស៊ីសុវត្ថិ ពង្សនារី មុនីពង្ស).

Her Royal Highness was raised by His Majesty King Father Norodom Sihanouk and Her Majesty Queen Mother Norodom Monineath Sihanouk, who treated her as their own daughter.

Her Royal Highness Samdech Sisowath Pongneary Monipong was granted the title of Her Royal Highness by His Majesty King Norodom Sihanouk in 1993 and was elevated to the title of Samdech by His Majesty King Norodom Sihamoni in 2004.
