= Liberal Party (Cambodia) =

Liberal Party គណបក្សសេរីនិយម Parti libéral
- Leader: Norodom Norindeth (until 1950)
- President: Meas Hell
- Founded: 1946
- Dissolved: 1955
- Merged into: Sangkum
- Headquarters: Phnom Penh, Cambodia
- Ideology: Conservatism; Monarchism
- Political position: Centre-right
- Religion: Theravada Buddhism

The Liberal Party (Khmer: គណបក្សសេរីនិយម), first known as the Constitutionalist Party, was a conservative, pro-French political party in Cambodia. The party was led by Prince Norodom Norindeth and was supported by the Khmer elites, the French, and members of the royal family. The party advocated an evolutionary approach for independence as opposed to their more radical rivals, the Democrats.

== General election results ==
Election	Total seats won	Total votes	Share of votes	Outcome of election	Election leader
1946	14 / 67	N/A	N/A	▲14 seats; opposition	Norodom Norindeth
1947	21 / 75	N/A	N/A	▲7 seats; opposition	Norodom Norindeth
1951	18 / 78	N/A	N/A	▼3 seats; opposition	Meas Hell
1955	0 / 91	5,488	0.7%	▼18 seats; no seats	Meas Hell
