= Peace Palace (Phnom Penh) =

Principal workplace of the Cambodian PM in Phnom Penh, Cambodia

- វិមានសន្តិភាព
- Seal of the Cabinet of Cambodia

- Building of the Peace Palace
- Interactive map of the Peace Palace area

General information
- Architectural style: New Khmer
- Location: 41 Georgi Dimitrov Blvd, Phnom Penh, Cambodia
- Coordinates: 11°34′11.6″N 104°55′04.7″E
- Completed: 19 October 2010
- Cost: US$50 million

Design and construction
- Architects: Ly Chhuong Construction Import&Export Company

The Peace Palace (Khmer: វិមានសន្តិភាព, Vĭméan Sântĕphéap), also known as the Office of the Prime Minister of Cambodia (Khmer: ការិយាល័យនៃនាយករដ្ឋមន្រ្តីនៃកម្ពុជា, Karĭyéaloăy ney Néayôk Rôdthâmôntrei ney Kâmpŭchéa), is the principal workplace of the Prime Minister of Cambodia. It is located in Phnom Penh. The building was officially inaugurated by King Norodom Sihamoni on 19 October 2010. Its overall cost was US$50 million. Aside from being the office of the Prime Minister, the Peace Palace has also chaired the East Asia Summit in 2012 and many other meetings with foreign leaders.

== Gallery ==
Front view.

Side view.

The Peace Palace at dusk.
