= Norodom Phurissara =

Norodom Phurissara នរោត្តម ភូរីស្សរ៉ា

Minister of Foreign Affairs
- In office: 1966 - 1970
- Predecessor: Norodom Viriya
- Successor: Yem Sambaur
- Born: 13 October 1919; Phnom Penh, Cambodia, French Indochina
- Died: April 1976 (aged 56); Phnom Penh, Democratic Kampuchea
- Spouse: Sisowath Darameth
- House: Norodom
- Father: Norodom Phanouvongs
- Education: Royal University of Phnom Penh
- Political party: Democratic Party; Sangkum

Prince Norodom Phurissara (Khmer: នរោត្ដម ភូរីស្សរ៉ា, October 13, 1919 – April 1976) was a prominent leftist Cambodian politician of the 1950s, 1960s and 1970s, who held a number of ministerial posts. A member of the Cambodian royal family, he disappeared during the political purges carried out by Angkar (The Organization) after it came to power at the end of the Cambodian Civil War and the Fall of Phnom Penh.

== Education and early political career ==
Phurissara was a descendant of Norodom of Cambodia, and a cousin of King Norodom Sihanouk. He studied law at the Royal University of Phnom Penh.

In 1954, he became Secretary-General of the Democratic Party, which until that point had been the dominant force in Cambodian internal politics. Phurissara and a group of Paris-educated radicals steered the party increasingly to the left. The American embassy reported that he considered American military assistance to the fledgling Cambodia state as "unnatural" and was increasingly accepting "basic pro-Communist ideas".

The Democrats, however, were to lose the 1955 elections to Sihanouk's Sangkum movement; the party later dissolved itself, allegedly under pressure from the Sangkum security apparatus. Phurissara went on to join the Sangkum and serve as the Cambodian Foreign Minister during the later 1960s, in a period when Sihanouk was strengthening ties with China and other communist nations like North Korea, Cuba, Laos and Vietnam.

== The GRUNK ==
After Sihanouk was deposed by his Prime Minister, General Lon Nol, in the Cambodian coup of 1970, he set up a government-in-exile, the GRUNK, incorporating his former communist opponents, the Khmer Rouge. Phurissara was to 'defect' to the communist 'liberated zone', and joined the GRUNK, later being appointed "Minister of Justice" from 1973, though he was to complain that the communists did not allow him any genuine power.

In early 1976, after the Khmer Rouge victory in the civil war, Sihanouk returned as Head of State, but was shortly to tender his resignation to the communists. They dispatched Phurissara, along with Ieng Sary, to persuade him to change his mind, but Sihanouk refused: While the Khmer Rouge leader Saloth Sâr (using the name Pol Pot that stands for "Politique Potentielle") served as the General Secretary of the Communist Party of Kampuchea (CPK) and was the Prime Minister of Democratic Kampuchea, following the Constitution of Democratic Kampuchea on 5 January 1976, after it was adopted by the National Congress on 14 December 1975, which puts into force from; Article 1: The State of Kampuchea is an independent, united, peaceful, neutral, non-aligned, sovereign and democratic State with territorial integrity, the State of Kampuchea is the State of the workers, peasants and other labourers of Kampuchea, the official name of the State of Kampuchea is: DEMOCRATIC KAMPUCHEA.

== Death ==
Phurissara was to continue in his role with the GRUNK for some months, but was soon removed in a purge of former Sihanoukists and more liberal Khmer Rouge cadres. He was initially sent to the Boeng Trabek re-education camp near "Phnom Penh", but later disappeared and is assumed to have been executed by Angkar. According to family members physically present at the time, sometime in April 1978 (exact date can not be ascertained) a Khmer Rouge military truck arrived at the location where Prince Phurissara had been assigned to live. The Khmer Rouge took Prince Phurissara and his wife into the truck and drove away. They were never seen again. It is widely believed they were taken to the area (Odom) where other royal family members were believed executed (murdered). Sihanouk was later to express a fear that Phurissara, who he supposed to have been brutally tortured and killed, along with other members of his family, had been targeted specifically due to Sihanouk's refusal to continue as Head of State.
