= Norodom Kanviman Norleak Tevi =

- Born: 1876; Cambodia
- Died: 1912 (aged 35–36)
- Spouse: Sisowath Monivong (m. 1894)
- Issue: Sisowath Pinnareth; Sisowath Thavet Roeungsi; Sisowath Sariletlak; Sisowath Kossamak; Sisowath Nearirakh; Sisowath Monireth; Sisowath Monipong
Names
- Norodom Kanviman Norleak Tevi
- House: Norodom (by birth); Sisowath (by marriage with Sisowath Monivong)
- Father: Norodom Hassakan

Norodom Kanviman Norleak Tevi (Khmer: នរោត្តម កានវិមាន នរល័ក្ខទេវី; 1876–1912) was a Cambodian princess, and the spouse of Sisowath Monivong, whom she married in 1894, and had seven children. She died in 1912, 15 years before Sisowath Monivong was crowned king.
