= Death and state funeral of Norodom Sihanouk =

2012 death and state funeral of the King of Cambodia

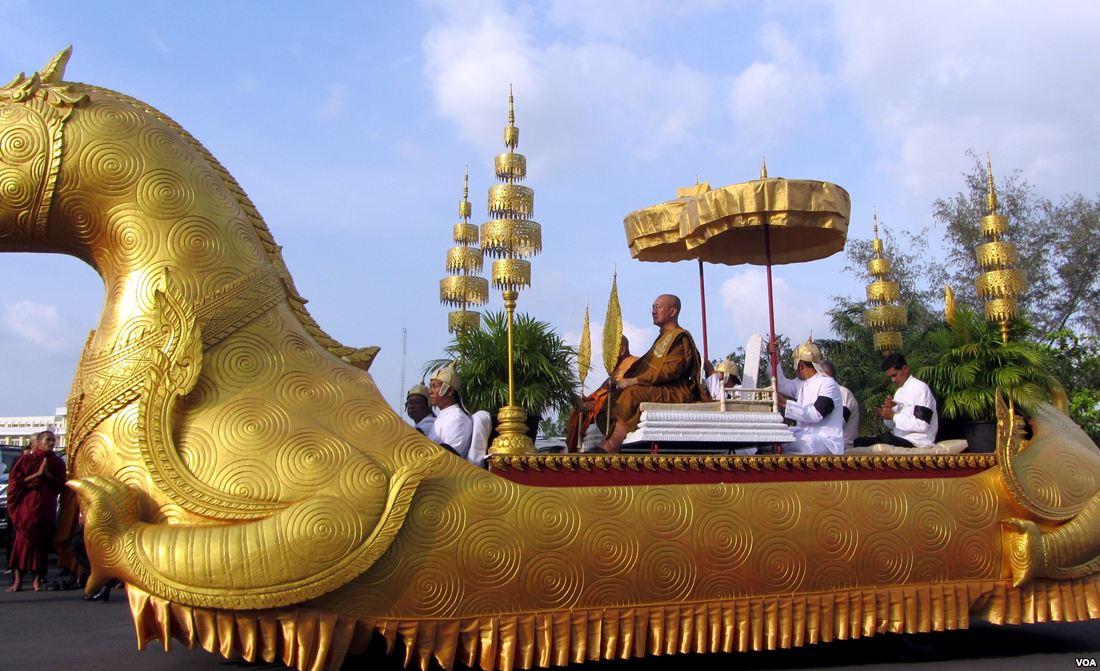
- Head of the Thammayut Order Bour Kry sits in a royal truck leading the procession that carries the coffin and body of former King Norodom Sihanouk, 17 October 2012.
- Date: 17 October 2012 (funeral procession); 1–4 February 2013 (cremation)
- Location: Phnom Penh, Cambodia
- Participants: Government of Cambodia, The Royal Family, and foreign dignitaries

On 15 October 2012, former Cambodian King and Prime Minister Norodom Sihanouk died at the age of 89, in Beijing, China, after suffering health issues. His death was announced by Deputy Prime Minister Nhek Bun Chhay. His body was brought back on 17 October 2012 by King Norodom Sihamoni and Prime Minister Hun Sen. State flags flew at half mast, and the government announced a 7-day mourning period for the former king.

== Death ==
Sihanouk had been receiving medical treatment in Beijing since January 2012 for a number of health problems, including colon cancer, diabetes, and hypertension. He died after a heart attack in Beijing on 15 October 2012, 1:20 a.m. Cambodian time, aged 89.

== Funeral ==
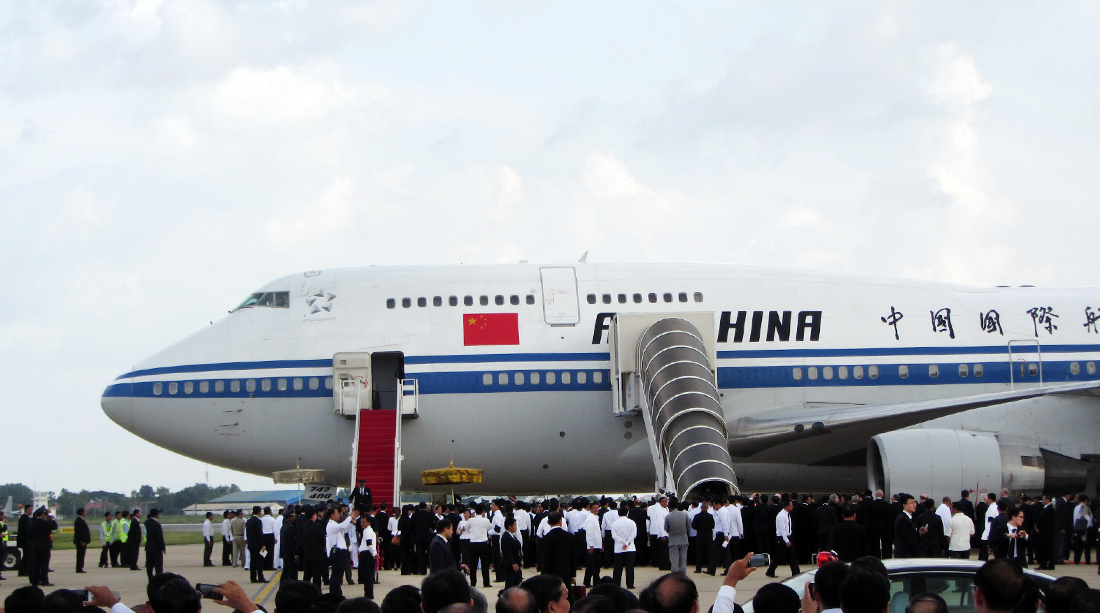
Cambodian officials gather near the Air China Boeing 747 arranged by the Chinese government at Phnom Penh International Airport to receive the body of former King Norodom Sihanouk as well as his widow, Queen Mother Norodom Monineath Sihanouk, and son, current King Norodom Sihamoni.

A state funeral was held on 17 October 2012 and the National Television of Cambodia repeatedly screened a 30-minute documentary about his life. Sihanouk's body then reposed in the Royal Palace until 1 February 2013 where it lay in state until 4 February 2013, when it was finally cremated. Sihanouk's royal coffin was adorned with gold and draped with the Royal Standard of the King of Cambodia.

The former king's body was greeted by 90 Buddhist monks who chanted prayers and by tens of thousands citizens waited along the road. Brought into the Royal Palace, his body reposed there until 1 February 2013. Sihanouk's body was removed from the palace on that day, and Cambodians gathered to bid one last farewell to their former leader. His body lay in state for three days and was cremated on 4 February 2013. The obsequies were attended by a number of foreign dignitaries, among whom were French Prime Minister Jean-Marc Ayrault, Thai Prime Minister Yingluck Shinawatra, Vietnamese Prime Minister Nguyen Tan Dung, Filipino Vice President Jejomar Binay, China's Jia Qinglin, Prince Akishino of Japan, Lao Prime Minister Thongsing Thammavong, Singaporean Deputy Prime Minister Tharman Shanmugaratnam, and others.

King Norodom Sihamoni presented Sihanouk with the title "Preah Karuna Preah Bat Samdech Preah Norodom Sihanouk Preah Borom Ratanakkot" (Khmer: ព្រះករុណាព្រះបាទសម្តេចព្រះនរោត្តម សីហនុ ព្រះបរមរតនកោដ្ឋ; literally "The King Who Lies in the Diamond Urn").

Foreign dignitaries who attended Sihanouk's funeral:

Country	Title	Dignitary
China	Chairman of the National Committee of the Chinese People's Political Consultative Conference	Jia Qinglin
France	Prime Minister of France	Jean-Marc Ayrault
India	Minister of Human Resource Development	M. M. Pallam Raju
Japan	Prince of Japan	Fumihito, Prince Akishino
Laos	Prime Minister of Laos	Thongsing Thammavong
Malaysia	Minister in the Prime Minister's Department	Koh Tsu Koon
Philippines	Vice President of the Philippines	Jejomar Binay
Singapore	Deputy Prime Minister of Singapore	Tharman Shanmugaratnam
Thailand	Prime Minister of Thailand	Yingluck Shinawatra
United States	United States Ambassador to Cambodia	William E. Todd
Vietnam	Prime Minister of Vietnam	Nguyễn Tấn Dũng

== Reactions ==
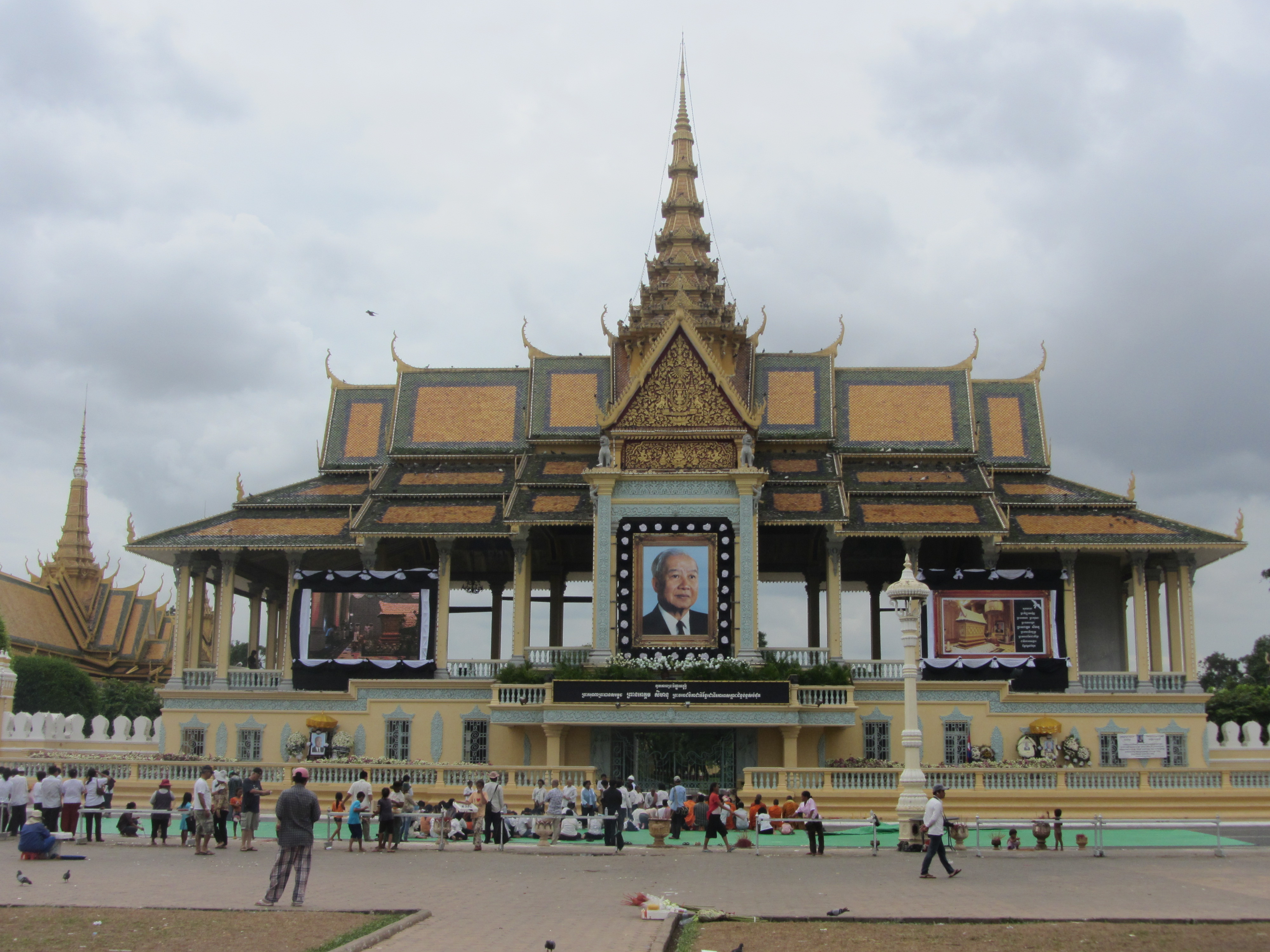
Portrait of Norodom Sihanouk being displayed at the Chan Chhaya Pavilion, Royal Palace.

=== Domestic ===
- Prince Sisowath Thomico, Sihanouk's assistant and nephew, said "his death was a great loss to Cambodia," adding that the former monarch had dedicated his life "for the sake of his entire nation, country and for the Cambodian people".
- Prime Minister Hun Sen, in a condolence letter to the Queen and King, praised the "remarkable and incomparable" former monarch who will be remembered by his compatriots "for eternity". Hun Sen and King Norodom Sihamoni flew to Beijing to retrieve the former king's body.
- Yim Sovann, spokesman for the opposition Sam Rainsy Party, praised the late King for bringing democracy to the country along with its independence.
- Prince Sisowath Sirirath, son of Prince Sisowath Sirik Matak who deposed Sihanouk, said "No matter what happened in the past, he is like a father figure to me and was kind to my family after he returned".

=== Organisations ===
- United Nations Secretary-General Ban Ki-moon expressed deep condolences with the royal family and the people of Cambodia. He praised Sihanouk as a 'unifying national leader'.

=== International ===
- Brunei: Sultan Hassanal Bolkiah expressed condolences in a message to King Norodom Sihamoni. Hassanal Bolkiah also stated that the late king was an outstanding statesman who brought much change, promoting stability and development in Cambodia. He would be sadly missed and long remembered by those who knew him. In a separate message to Hun Sen, Hassanal Bolkiah stated that the late king was a great leader whose legacy would be remembered especially his contribution to peace, stability and development in Cambodia. On 18 November, Hassanal Bolkiah paid respects to the remains of the former Cambodian king at the Royal Palace in Phnom Penh.
- China: The Chinese government mourned the death of former Cambodian King Norodom Sihanouk, who was described as "an old friend of the Chinese people" and spent his last days in Beijing, which he regarded as his second home. President Hu Jintao and Premier Wen Jiabao have paid tribute to Sihanouk. Then vice president Xi Jinping expressed his condolences to Queen Mother Monineath in Beijing in person and called the former King an old friend of the Chinese people who had helped forge strong relations between the two countries.
- France: President François Hollande was saddened by Sihanouk's death. Hollande described Sihanouk as "Author of the independence of Cambodia, indefatigable defender of his country in the international community, (Sihanouk) was, for many, the symbol of evenhanded Asian policy and... the sovereignty of nations."

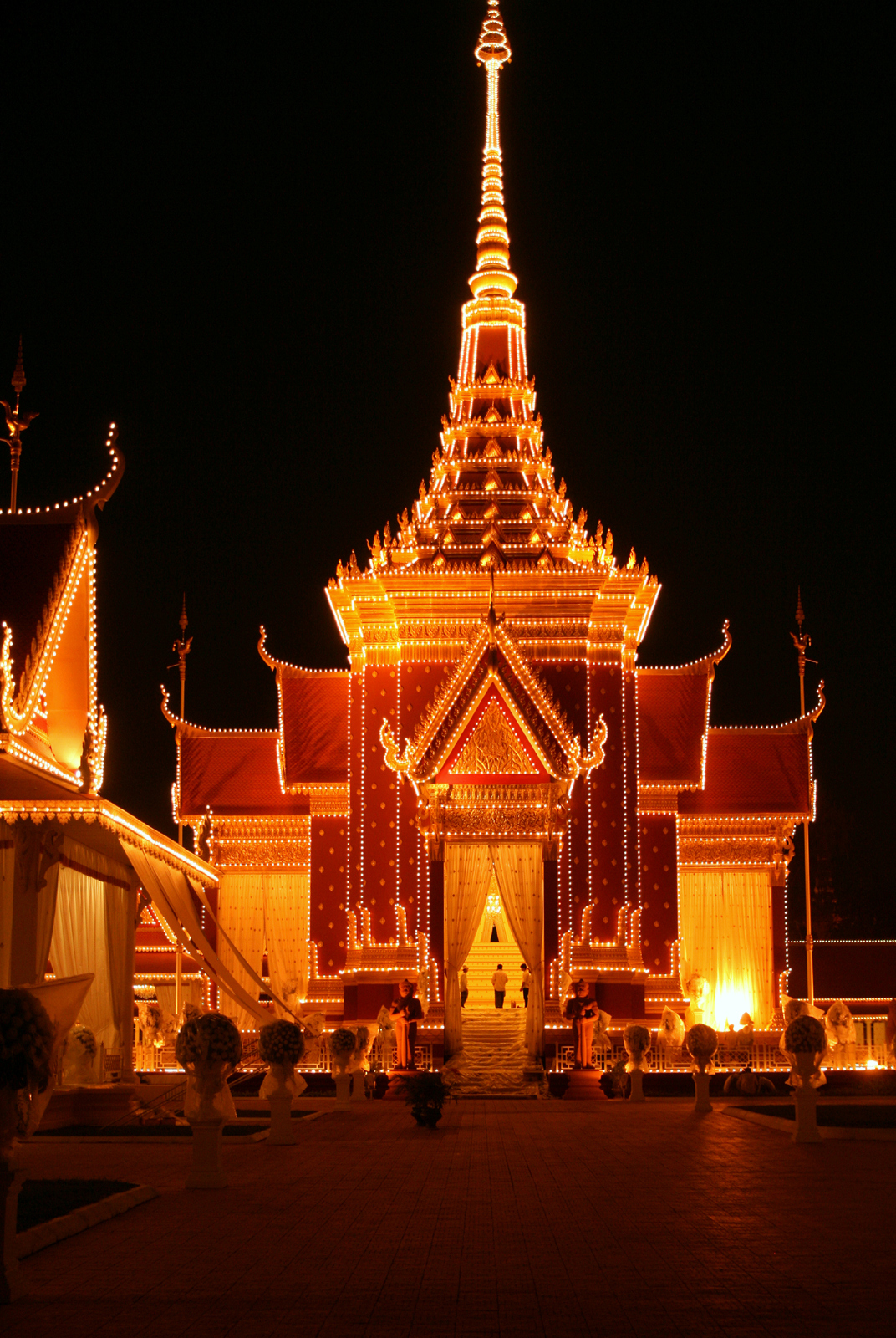
Sihanouk's royal crematorium.

- Indonesia: President Susilo Bambang Yudhoyono called Sihanouk 'a great friend of Indonesia'. Yudhoyono noted that the former Cambodian king had "very good relationships" with Indonesia's first President Sukarno and his successor President Suharto.
- Japan: Japanese Prime Minister Yoshihiko Noda sent a statement of condolence to Prime Minister Hun Sen. "He [the King] built a foundation for the relationship between our two countries for the future…and deeply understood Japan’s contribution in seeking peace for Cambodia,” Noda said.
- Malaysia: Representing the Malaysian Government, Minister in the Prime Minister's Department Tan Sri Dr Koh Tsu Koon paid his last respects to the former Cambodian king. Koh conveyed his condolences to Sihanouk's brother, Norodom Preya Sophon, and laid a wreath as a final respect to the former king whose body was lying instate at the palace. On his message, the minister described Sihanouk as a charismatic leader who brought independence and prosperity to Cambodia, and was an influential leader in strengthening bilateral relations between Malaysia and Cambodia.
- North Korea: North Korean leader Kim Jong-un praised former king Sihanouk as a "close friend" of Pyongyang. "I express sincere condolences to the bereaved family and the Cambodian people," Kim said in a message to Sihanouk's son and the reigning king Norodom Sihamoni.
- Singapore: Singaporean Prime Minister Lee Hsien Loong honored Sihanouk as a "great friend of Singapore". He and his wife attended the royal palace and paid respects to Sihanouk and offered his condolences to the royal family.
- Thailand: Thai king Bhumibol Adulyadej and the royal family expressed deep sorrow over Sihanouk's death. Prime Minister Yingluck Shinawatra attended the cremation ceremony on behalf of the Thai government.
- United States: The Embassy of the United States in Phnom Penh sent their condolences to the King's Family and the Cambodian people on the passing of Sihanouk.
- Vietnam: Prime Minister Nguyen Tan Dung expressed deep condolences and led delegation to his funeral. He ordered Hanoi flags to be flown at half-mast.
