= 1955 Cambodian general election =

- 9 June 1955

All 91 seats in the National Assembly 46 seats needed for a majority
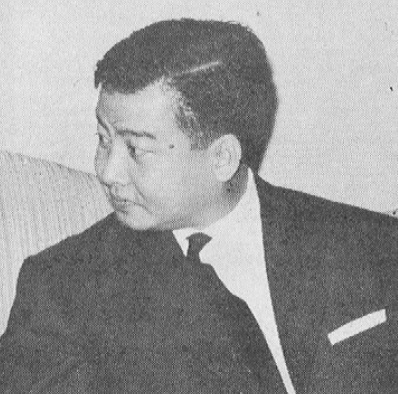
	First party
Leader	Norodom Sihanouk
Party	Sangkum
Last election	–
Seats won	91
Popular vote	630,085
Percentage	82.72%
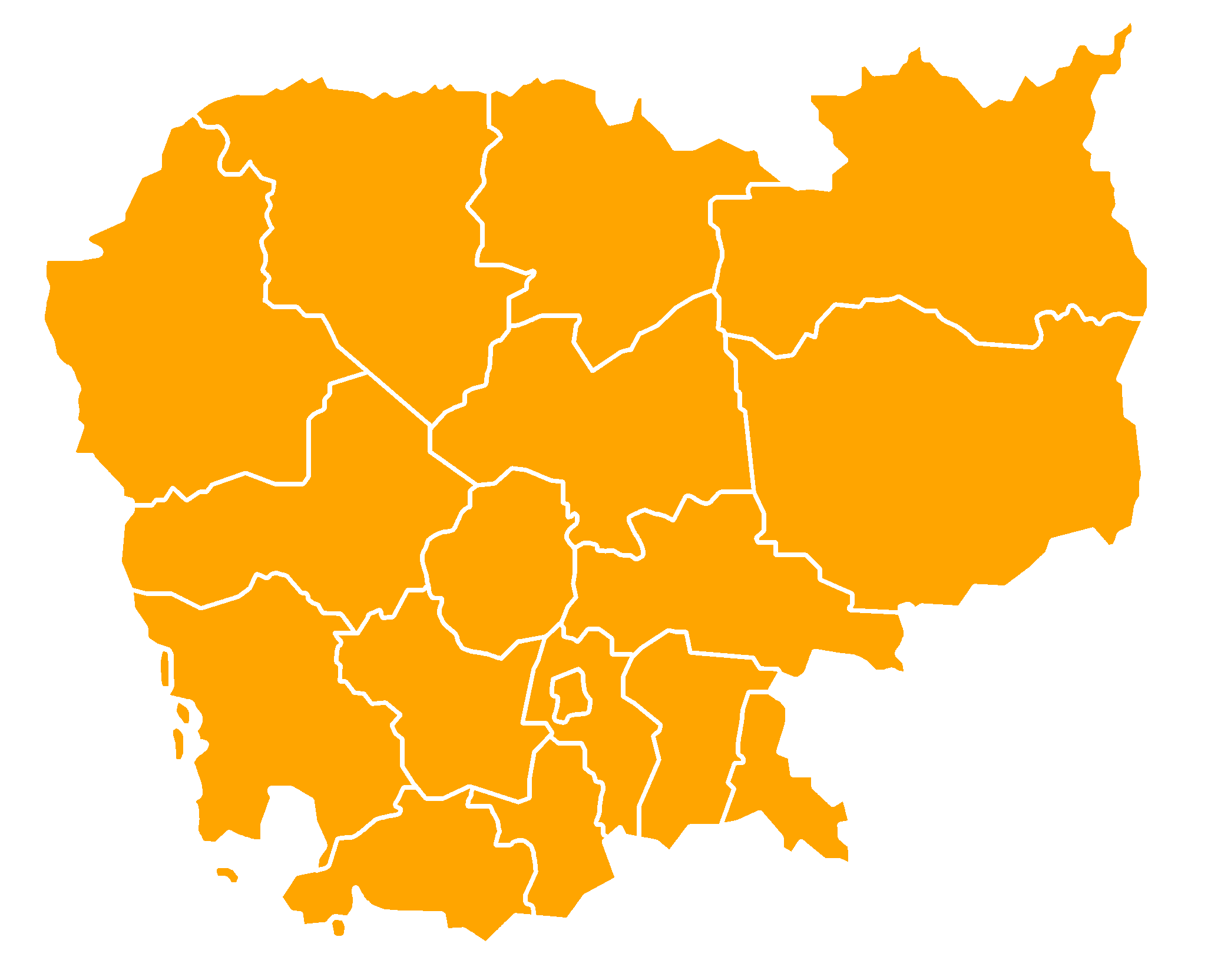
- Results by constituency Sangkum

General elections were held in Cambodia on 9 June 1955. The elections were held following the peace established at the 1954 Geneva Conference and the independence of the country. The election were postponed to September 1955. The result was a landslide victory for the Sangkum party, which won all 91 seats. The election was marked by widespread voter fraud and intimidation. This began a period of one-party dominance of Prince Sihanouk's Sangkum until the coup of 1970.

== Participating parties ==
- Sangkum: In October 1954 the royal government formed an alliance with four small political parties, including Dap Chhuon's Victorious North-East and Lon Nol's Khmer Renovation. In February 1954 the alliance was transformed into Sangkum Reastr Niyum (Popular Socialist Community). The leader of Sangkum, Prince Norodom Sihanouk, held that Sangkum was not a political party per se, but Sangkum essentially functioned as the pro-Sihanouk political party. Sangkum contested all of the 91 seats.
- Democratic Party: The leadership of the Democratic Party was significantly radicalized during 1954, as left-leaning students returned to Cambodia from France. By February 1955, the radicals had wrested control over the party. Many of the new leaders had been members of the 'Marxist Circle' in Paris. Prince Norodom Phurissara became the general secretary of the party. The Democratic Party contested all 91 seats.
- Krom Pracheachon: The outcome of the Geneva talks provided that former communist rebels would have been protected by the International Commission of Supervision and Control during the election campaign, but in reality such guarantees were not given. With this backdrop, thousands of the communist rebels had left for (North) Vietnam. In the end of 1954, a group of communist leaders in Phnom Penh, Keo Meas, Non Suon and Penn Yuth, had tried to organize a legal 'Khmer Resistance Party'. Its registration was, however, refused by the authorities. In the beginning of 1955 the group was able to register themselves under a different name, the Krom Pracheachon (People's Group). Pracheachon was essentially the front of the underground Khmer People's Revolutionary Party. Nuon Chea shifted from his rural base, to become the Phnom Penh city party secretary of Pracheachon. The young Saloth Sar (Pol Pot) was also involved in organizing the Pracheachon. During the campaign, the group was subjected to harassment by the government. As a result, the group could only present candidates in 35 seats.
- Thanhists: The Thanhist Pracheachalona (People's Movement) had lost much of its political appeal, after the nationalist stalwart Son Ngoc Thanh had been rejected by Sihanouk and left for the Thai border.

== Results ==
Party	Votes	%	Seats	+/–
Sangkum	630,085	82.72	91	New
Democratic Party	93,921	12.33	0	–54
Pracheachon	29,505	3.87	0	New
Liberal Party	5,488	0.72	0	–18
Nationalist Party	1,140	0.15	0	New
Khmer Ekreach	770	0.10	0	New
Khmer Labour Party	289	0.04	0	New
Independents	546	0.07	0	0
Total	761,744	100.00	91	+13
Source: Nohlen et al.

== Accusations of fraud ==
Afterwards, accusations of massive electoral fraud arose. Kiernan (1985) notes that there were constituencies where the communists were judged to have strong popular support in which the Pracheachon candidates didn't obtain a single vote. In Memot, where communist guerrillas had been strong during the war and where there was a strong leftist following amongst rubber plantation workers, official figures gave 6149 votes for Sangkum, 99 for the Democrats and 0 votes for the Pracheachon candidate Sok Saphai.

Sihanouk himself implicitly admitted the fraud in a 1958 publication. He mentions 39 districts of the country as 'red' or 'pink', meaning Pracheachon or Democratic candidates won those seats, based on the 1955 voting. Several of the district he points out as communist strongholds in the 1955 elections, were constituencies where Pracheachon candidates officially had obtained few votes or none at all.
