= Chan Nak =

13th Prime Minister of Cambodia

- ចាន់ ណាក់

Prime Minister of Cambodia
- In office 23 November 1953 – 7 April 1954
- Monarch: Norodom Sihanouk
- Preceded by: Penn Nouth
- Succeeded by: Norodom Sihanouk

Minister of Justice
- In office 1945–1946
- Prime Minister: Sisowath Monireth

Minister of Interior
- In office 1953–1954

Minister of Information
- In office 1953–1954

Personal details
- Born: 27 May 1892 Phnom Penh, Cambodia, French Indochina
- Died: 7 November 1954 (aged 62) Paris, France

Chan Nak (Khmer: ចាន់ ណាក់; 27 May 1892 – 7 November 1954) was a Cambodian politician who served as the Prime Minister of Cambodia from 1953 to 1954. He was the second prime minister of an independent Cambodia, following Penn Nouth.

Before being appointed the prime minister, Nak served as the Minister of Justice in 1945, 1945–1946 and 1950, the Interior Minister from 1953 to 1954 and the Information Minister from 1953 to 1954.

Political offices
Preceded by Penn Nouth	Prime Minister of Cambodia; 1953–1954	Succeeded by Norodom Sihanouk
