= Sisowath Ritharavong =

Prince Sisowath Ritharavong (Khmer: ស៊ីសុវតិ្ថ រីតារ៉ាវង្ស, February 6, 1935 – 1975) was the father of Prince Sisowath Sararith, son of Prince Sisowath Sisura (line of Prince Sisowath Essaravong). His mother was Princess Sisowath Darameth, daughter of Prince Sisowath Dung Leakhana.

He served in the Royal Cambodian Navy Rank in US Military equivalent O-5 (US Navy Captain... US Army "Bird" or Full Col.) March 3, 1975 when he was arrested by the Khmer Rouge on the orders of "Angkar". Ritharavong was imprisoned at S-21 prison, Phnom Penh where he is believed to have been executed. Many members of the Cambodian Royal family were executed quietly at the Olympic Stadium by the orders of Angkar soon after the fall of Phnom Penh in April 1975. To date, no records of these executions have been found.

The Prince was married to Ms. Hubertine Belconde and had two children, Chhath Noreth and Theraknhean, who are now living in the United States.
