= Khim Tit =

15th Prime Minister of Cambodia

- ឃឹម ទិត
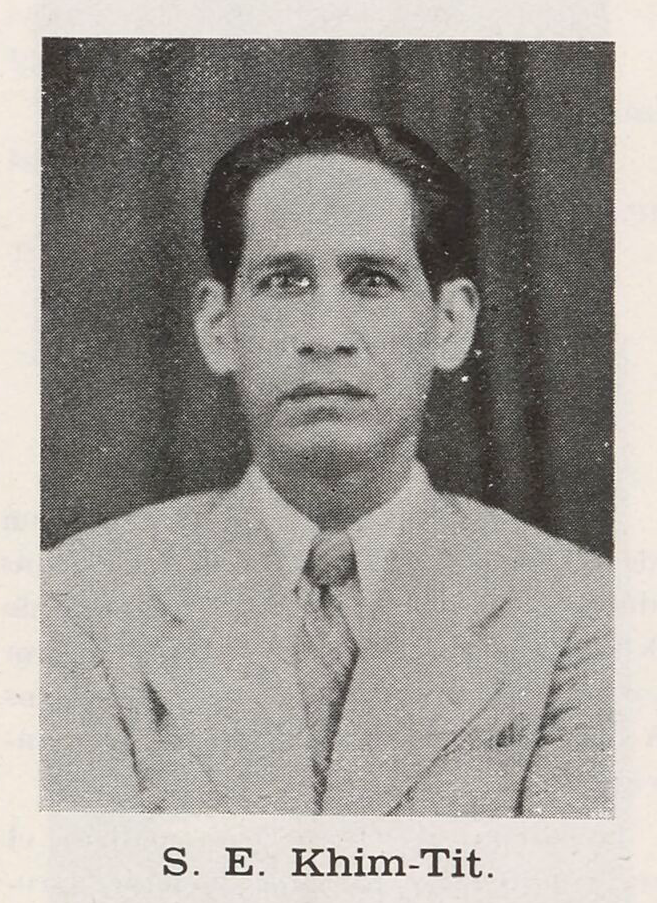
- Tit in 1942

Prime Minister of Cambodia
- In office 3 April 1956 – 29 July 1956
- Monarch: Norodom Suramarit
- Preceded by: Norodom Sihanouk
- Succeeded by: Norodom Sihanouk

Personal details
- Born: 12 June 1896 Phnom Penh, Cambodia, French Indochina
- Died: 1975 (aged 78–79) Kampuchea
- Party: Sangkum

Khim Tit (Khmer: ឃឹម ទិត; 1896 – 1975) was a Cambodian politician who served as Prime Minister of Cambodia from April to July 1956. He was arrested by the regime of Pol Pot and Khieu Samphan at the dead of night and executed by the Khmer Rouge in 1975 on the orders of the Angkar and the Communist Party of Kampuchea (CPK).
