= Pho Proeung =

19th Prime Minister of Cambodia

- ផូ ព្រឿង

Prime Minister of Cambodia
- In office 18 April 1960 – 28 January 1961
- President: Norodom Sihanouk
- Preceded by: Norodom Sihanouk
- Succeeded by: Penn Nouth

Governor of Battambang Province
- In office 1951–1954

Personal details
- Born: 12 August 1903 Phnom Penh, Cambodia, French Indochina
- Died: 1975 (aged 71–72) Kampuchea
- Party: Independent

Pho Proeung{{efn|Khmer: ផូ ព្រឿង, Pho Prueang; Khmer pronunciation: [pʰoː prɨəŋ], (12 August 1903 – c. 1975), was Prime Minister of Cambodia from 1960 to 1961. He was the Minister of Finance in 1955. Pho Proeung'son is Pho Sonthmony. He was late Royal Cambodian Army Corps of Engineers who was married to Neak No, who is the daughter of princess Sisowath Sakethan. Princess Sisowath Sakethan is one of seven daughters of king Sisowath's eleventh son, Sisowath Duong-Lakhana, who was born in 1876. He was hunted down by the Khmer Rouge and the Communist Party of Kampuchea (CPK) led by Pol Pot and Khieu Samphan on the orders of Angkar at the dead of night and executed in 1975.
