= Electoral symbol =

Political party symbol for use on ballots

An electoral symbol is a standardised symbol allocated to an independent candidate or political party by a country's election commission for use in election ballots.

== Usage ==
Symbols are used by parties in their campaigning, and printed on ballot papers where a voter must make a mark to vote for the associated party. One of their purposes is to facilitate voting by illiterate people, who cannot read candidates' names on ballot papers.

=== Colloquial symbols ===
In the United States, the Democratic Party has been associated with imagery of donkeys. This use was derived from opponents of then-president Andrew Jackson insulting him as a "jackass" to characterize his stubbornness, and later popularized in 1870 by political cartoonist Thomas Nast. In 1874, Nast also popularized the contrasting use of an elephant to similarly symbolize the Republican Party.

The Republican Party has since used an elephant as part of its official branding. While the donkey is widely-used by Democrats as an unofficial mascot, the party's first official logo—adopted in 2010—is an encircled "D". In some regions, the two parties may be associated with other symbols, such as a star and bald eagle respectively.

=== Logos ===
Some countries have party logos or flags appear on the ballot. In New Zealand, the party logo is part of the party's official registration.

=== Standardised symbols ===
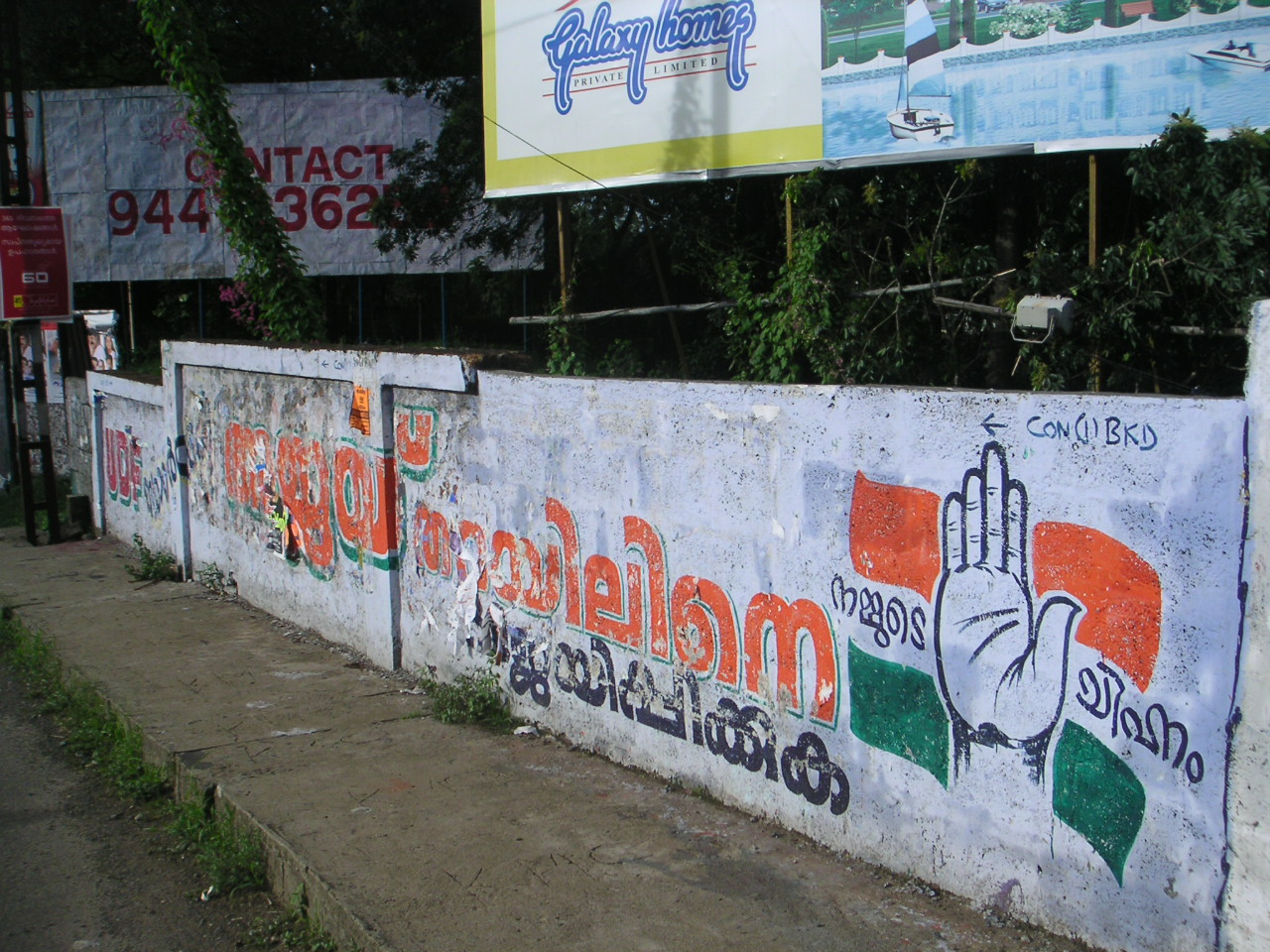
Mural in Kerala showing the hand of the Indian National Congress

India has a system of standardised symbols, which was adopted due to low literacy rates at the time of its independence. Parties can either choose from a catalog provided by the Election Commission of India or suggest their own symbol. The catalog includes items such as a ceiling fan, purse, mango, air conditioner, or broom, with some items being adopted by parties for symbolic reasons. A symbol assigned to a party designated as a national party can not be used by other parties in the country. A symbol assigned to a state party in one state can be allocated to different state party in another state.

A similar system is used in Pakistan, where parties and candidates must be identified via one of the symbols approved by the Election Commission of Pakistan, such as the Pakistan People's Party arrow, the Pakistan Muslim League (N) tiger, and the Pakistan Tehreek-e-Insaf cricket bat (in reference to party founder Imran Khan being a retired player).

The availability and assignments of certain symbols have led to controversies; in Pakistan the book icon has faced criticism from secularist parties who believed that its assignment to Jamiat Ulema-e-Islam (F) allowed it to be presented as the Quran The Indian National Congress's hand was the target of conspiracy theories that stated it was an Islamic symbol.

=== Numbers ===
Some countries assign numbers to parties, such as the two-digit electoral numbers in Brazil.

=== Letters ===
A system of 1–4 Hebrew letters and additional symbols of 1–4 Arabic letters is used in Israel (this also facilitates voters whose knowledge of Hebrew or Arabic, the two most spoken languages, is limited).

Danish and Icelandic parties are identified by a singular "party letter", which may or may not be the initial letter of the party's name. Denmark uses a separate set of letters for parliamentary minutes and documents which differ from the electoral ones. In Iceland, the party letters were initially assigned alphabetically in order of the establishment date; today new letters are chosen by the Icelandic Ministry of Justice.
