= Sisowath Monipong =

10th Prime Minister of Cambodia

- ស៊ីសុវត្ថិ មុនីពង្ស
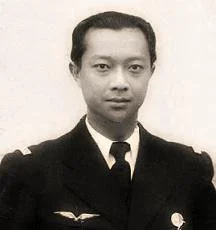
- Sisowath in 1939

Prime Minister of Cambodia
- In office 30 May 1950 – 3 March 1951
- Monarch: Norodom Sihanouk
- Preceded by: Norodom Sihanouk
- Succeeded by: Oum Chheang Sun

Cambodian Ambassador to France
- In office 3 March 1955 – 31 August 1956
- Monarchs: Norodom Sihanouk; Norodom Suramarit
- Prime Minister: Norodom Sihanouk (1956, 1955–1956); Oum Chheang Sun (1956); Leng Ngeth (1955)

Personal details
- Born: 25 August 1912 Phnom Penh, Cambodia, French Indochina
- Died: 31 August 1956 (aged 44) Paris, France
- Resting place: Oudong, Cambodia
- Party: Independent
- Children: 13
- Parents: Sisowath Monivong (father); Norodom Kanviman Norleak Tevi (mother)
- House: Sisowath

Military service
- Allegiance: French Third Republic; Free France
- Branch/service: French Foreign Legion; French Air Force
- Years of service: 1939–1945
- Battles/wars: World War II

Sisowath Monipong (Khmer: ស៊ីសុវត្ថិ មុនីពង្ស; 25 August 1912 – 31 August 1956) was the second son of the former King of Cambodia, Sisowath Monivong and Princess Norodom Kanviman Norleak Tevi. He took part in Cambodian politics during and after World War II.

== Biography ==
He began his studies in Cambodia, before being sent to France, in Grasse then in Nice, from 1927, under the control of the Governor of Indochina, François Marius Baudoin. Back to Cambodia in 1930, he spent a whole year at the monastery of Vatt Botum Vaddey in Phnom Penh.

The year after, the prince went back to France, where he eventually entered the prestigious academy of École spéciale militaire de Saint-Cyr-Coëtquidan. In 1939, he joined the French Air Force and took part in military operations until June 1940. After his father's death on 23 April 1941, his nephew, King Norodom Sihanouk, nominated him as "Preah Ang Krom Luong" on 2 May 1941.

From 1941 on, Prince Sisowath Monipong participated actively in Cambodian politics. He was appointed Royal Delegate for Health, Sports and Economy and in 1946, he was designated Minister of National Education in the government led by his eldest brother, Prince Samdech Krom Preah Sisowath Monireth. In May 1949, he was made Director General of Services in the Royal Palace and, in November 1949, represented Cambodia in Paris for the signature of the first treaty between France and Cambodia, as part of the Union Française. Eventually, in 1950, he was appointed Prime Minister (1 June 1950 – 3 March 1951).

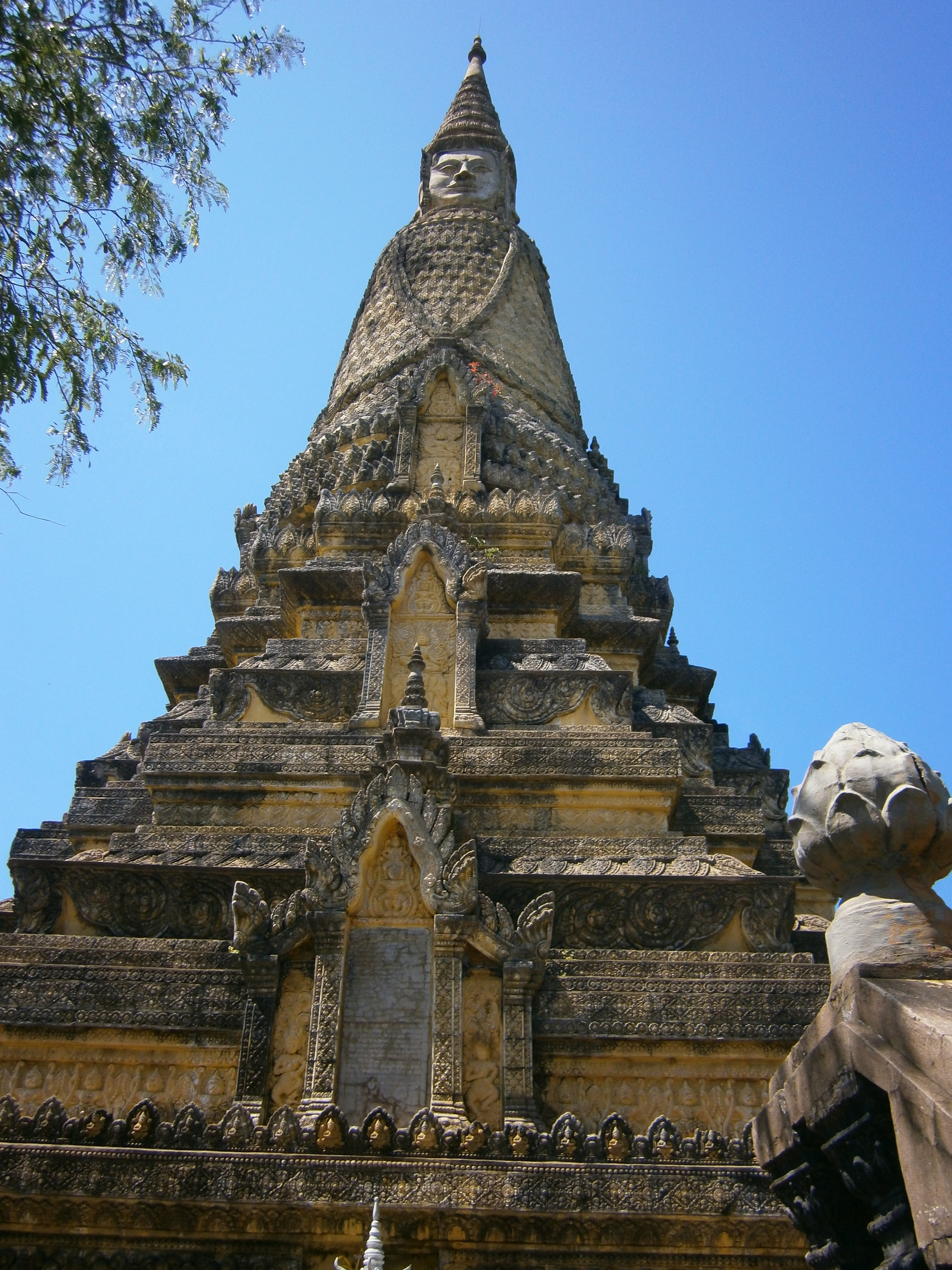
Prince Sisowath Monipong's ashes rest in the same stupa as those of his father Sisowath Monivong in Oudong.

In 1955, after the abdication of Norodom Sihanouk and the nomination of King Norodom Suramarit and of Her Majesty Samdech Preah Mahaksatriyani Queen Sisowath Kosamak Nearirâth Serey Vatthana, his elder sister, prince Sisowath Monipong was appointed Ambassador of Cambodia in Paris, where he died of a heart attack on 31 August 1956. His funeral took place in Phnom Penh a couple of years after, following the ancient tradition of the Khmer monarchy. His ashes were deposited by his eldest son, Prince Sisowath Samyl Monipong in the stupa of king Sisowath Monivong, on the holy hill of Phnom Preah Reach Troap in Oudong.

== Private life ==
Prince Sisowath Monipong had 5 wives and 13 children:

- from Neak Mneang Andrée Lambert :
  - Prince Sisowath Samyl Monipong (11 April 1941 – 2020)
- from Neak Mneang Phit Sopheak Samosan Chhomya :
  - Princess Sisowath Pongsirya (23 February 1942 – 1975)
  - Prince Sisowath Monisisowath (20 January 1943 – 1975)
  - Princess Sisowath Monirinsy (22 July 1945)
- from Mam Duong Monirak Ous :
  - Princess Sisowath Lysa (20 November 1942 – 1975)
- from Neak Mneang Son Sunneary :
  - Princess Sisowath Sovethvong (17 September 1945 – 1994)
  - Princess Sisowath Pongneary (29 May 1947)
  - Princess Sisowath Monisophea (1 June 1949 – 1975)
  - Prince Sisowath Duong Daravong (10 August 1950 – 1974)
- from Neak Mneang Chan Sorey :
  - Prince Sisowath Reymoni (23 June 1952 - 1975)
  - Princess Sisowath Siviman (8 May 1953 - 1975)
  - Princess Sisowath Phuong Nara Sylvia (9 November 1954)
  - Princess Sisowath Ponnirath (25 September 1956 - 1975)
