= Norodom Montana =

Cambodian politician (1902–1975)

Prince Norodom Montana (Khmer: នរោត្តម ម៉ុងតាណា) was a Cambodian politician, who held a number of ministerial posts and served as the president of the upper chamber of the legislature.

Montana was born on 18 March 1902 in Phnom Penh. A member of the Cambodian royal family, he was a son of prince Monthonthanay and grandson of prince Norodom Duong Chakr. He worked in the French civil service. He was minister of religion, and then minister of economy from March to August 1945, then minister of agriculture from August to October 1945. He founded Progressive Democratic Party in April 1946, which failed to win any seats in the National Assembly of Cambodia in 1947. Montana became a member of the High Council of the Kingdom in 1948. He was minister of public training and sports from November 1953 to April 1954, then minister of public religion and labor in April 1954, then minister of public health and labour from April to July 1954. He was appointed minister of education from January to September 1955. He was later appointed as governor of Kampot province and later governor of Kampong Speu province. He was president of the Royal Council from 1963 to at least 1967.

Montana married several times and had 13 children.

It is believed that he died in 1975 during the political purges carried out by the Khmer Rouge after it took power.
