= Yem Sambaur =

8th Prime Minister of Cambodia

- យ៉ែម សំបូរ
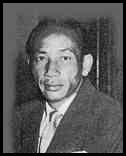

Prime Minister of Cambodia
- In office 29 September 1949 – 28 April 1950
- Monarch: Norodom Sihanouk
- Preceded by: Ieu Koeus
- Succeeded by: Norodom Sihanouk
- In office 12 February 1949 – 20 September 1949
- Monarch: Norodom Sihanouk
- Preceded by: Penn Nouth
- Succeeded by: Ieu Koeus

President of the Parliament of Khmer Republic
- In office May 1971 – 1972
- Preceded by: In Tam
- Succeeded by: Tan Kim Huon

Personal details
- Born: 2 February 1913 Battambang, Cambodia, French Indochina
- Died: December 1989 (aged 76) Paris, France
- Party: Democratic
- Other political affiliations: National Recovery Party

Yem Sambaur (Khmer: យ៉ែម សំបូរ, Khmer pronunciation: [jaem sɑmbou]; 2 February 1913 – December 1989) was a Cambodian politician who served twice as prime minister of Cambodia between 1949 and 1950.

Yem Sambaur was an influential political figure in Cambodia, mainly during the turbulent years between the end of World War II and final achievement of independence in 1953. Although Sambaur maintained close relationships with the palace and traditional elites of Khmer society, he was initially a member of the Cambodian Democratic Party, a heavily left-leaning coalition of groups which favored immediate independence, a Cambodian government modeled after the French Fourth Republic and sympathized with the armed resistance of the Khmer Issarak guerrilla movements. Unsatisfied with these goals, Sambaur left the Democratic Party in November 1948, taking along with him eleven other deputies, and foundes his own party which worked together himself with the Liberal Party (Kanak Sereipheap) led by Prince Norodom Norindeth which had French support and favored gradual independence, a strong monarch and close ties with France. Sambaur's defection left the Democratic Party temporarily, but severely, weakened and allowed more the more radical elements including Hu Nim, Ieng Sary and Saloth Sar (later known as Pol Pot), to gain influence in the party. Although the Democratic Party was later dissolved in 1957, these names would haunt Cambodia decades later.

After the sudden death of Prime Minister Prince Sisowath Youtevong, the leader and founder of the Democratic Party on 11 July 1947, the unstable fledgling Cambodian polity saw three governments in an 18-month period, all headed by the Democratic Party. In January 1949 Sambaur, as commissioner of the police, exposed a political scandal involving Cambodia's fisheries and Prime Minister Penn Nouth who was forced to step down. King Norodom Sihanouk then persuaded Ieu Koeus, the president of the National Assembly to appoint Sambaur as the new prime minister. On 1 February 1949, he then formed a coalition government with Liberal Party deputies with the backing of the king and the support of the French.

During his term, he was constantly opposed by the Democrat led Assembly and faced popular criticism for his plans to open a casino. The criticism intensified when Minister of Education Meas Saem closed the Lycee Sisowath in response to the protests. Sambaur's government fell in September 1949. The Democratic Party again took the reins with Ieu Koeus as prime minister. His administration lasted nine days until the King, tired of ministerial instability, took advantage of ambiguous wording in the Democratic Party drafted constitution and stepped in. Asserting his newly claimed powers, the King dissolved the National Assembly, postponed elections and formed a new government without an Assembly and named Sambour Prime Minister again. As an ally of Sihanouk, he continued to support efforts by Shihanouk to gain concessions from the French and move towards independence. Sambaur resigned in April 1950 and Sihanouk himself became prime minister.

Twenty years later, after the Cambodian coup of 1970 that deposed Sihanouk and placed Lon Nol in power, Sambaur wrote an essay defending his withdrawal of support for the King entitled តើហេតុអ្វីបានជាយើងបោះបង់ចោលសីហនុ ("Why We Abandoned Sihanouk").

Political offices
| Preceded by Penn Nouth | Prime Minister of Cambodia; 1949 | Succeeded by Ieu Koeus |
| Preceded by Ieu Koeus | Prime Minister of Cambodia; 1949–1950 | Succeeded by Norodom Sihanouk |
