= Norodom Norindeth =

- Born: 1906?
- Died: 1975

Prince Norodom Norindeth (Khmer: នរោត្តម នរិន្ទដេត, 1906?–1975) was a member of the royal family of Cambodia. Active as a politician and diplomat during the 1940s, 1950s and 1960s, he started a notable political party.

== Biography ==
Norindeth was a grandson of Norodom of Cambodia and was educated at the University of Paris. Under the French-imposed Cambodian constitution, any member of the Norodom or Sisowath descendants of King Ang Duong could be chosen as the country's king, and after the 1941 death of Sisowath Monivong, Norindeth, along with Sisowath Monireth and Norodom Suramarit, was one of several main candidates for the throne. However, the French authorities ultimately selected his 19-year-old nephew Norodom Sihanouk as king, though Norindeth was made a member of the Council of Regency.

In 1946 Norindeth formed the Liberal Party, initially known as the Constitutionalist Party. It was the first to be created in the country's history. The Liberals were broadly pro-French and advocated a gradual approach to self-rule, maintaining strong French links: Norindeth hoped to gain the guaranteed support of the elite, anticommunists, and the country's Cham minority. Unlike their main rivals, the radical and pro-independence Democratic Party of Ieu Koeus and Prince Sisowath Youtevong, the Liberals were heavily funded by the French, who backed them covertly as a way of maintaining their influence. Norindeth organised Party meetings at his home, though these served to convince some observers that the Prince "had no idea of politics".

The Democratic Party had initial electoral success and was for several years the most popular in the country. In 1950 its leader Ieu Koeus was assassinated, blame being pointed at a member of Norindeth's entourage. Norindeth fled to Paris as a result of being linked with the assassin. The Liberal Party, however, were to gain a temporary ascendancy in the Assembly as a result of the Democrats' disorganisation.

Norindeth returned to Cambodia in 1951 and was to leave the Liberal Party and join Sihanouk's Sangkum political movement after its formation in 1955. Later that year he became the first permanent Cambodian delegate to UNESCO. During the 1960s, he was successively appointed the Ambassador to Yugoslavia (1961–63) and Burma (1964-67).

Norindeth was one of the many members of the Cambodian royal family who were killed subsequent to the Khmer Rouge takeover in April 1975.

== Bibliography ==
- Corfield, Justin; Summers, Laura (2002). Historical Dictionary of Cambodia. Scarecrow Press. ISBN 9780810845244.
- Kiernan, Ben (2008). How Pol Pot Came to Power: Colonialism, Nationalism, and Communism in Cambodia, 1930–1975. Yale University Press. ISBN 9780300148442.
- Corfield, Justin J. (1994). Khmers Stand Up!: A History of the Cambodian Government 1970–1975. Centre of Southeast Asian Studies, Monash University. ISBN 9780732605650.
- Joint Translation Service (1963). Summary of the Yugoslav Press. The Service.
- Corfield, Justin (2009). The History of Cambodia. Greenwood. ISBN 9780313357220.
