= Sisowath Watchayavong =

5th Prime Minister of Cambodia

- ស៊ីសុវត្ថិ វឌ្ឍឆាយាវង្ស
- Watchyavong, c. 1930s

Prime Minister of Cambodia
- In office 25 July 1947 – 20 February 1948
- Monarch: Norodom Sihanouk
- Preceded by: Sisowath Youtevong
- Succeeded by: Chhean Vam

Personal details
- Born: 13 September 1891 Phnom Penh, Cambodia, French Indochina
- Died: 30 January 1972 (aged 80) Phnom Penh, Khmer Republic
- Party: Democratic Party
- Parent: Sisowath Vathanavongs (father)
- Education: École libre des sciences politiques
- House: Sisowath

Sisowath Watchayavong (Khmer: ស៊ីសុវត្ថិ វឌ្ឍឆាយាវង្ស; 13 September 1891 – 30 January 1972) was a Cambodian politician who served as the Prime Minister of Cambodia from 1947 to 1948. He was a grandson of King Sisowath.

He was appointed to the High Council of the Kingdom in 1967. He had at least 25 children.

Sisowath Watchayavong House of Sisowath Born: 13 September 1891 Died: 30 January 1972
Political offices
Preceded by Sisowath Youtevong	Prime Minister of Cambodia; 1947–1948	Succeeded by Chhean Vam
