= 1946 Cambodian general election =

- 1 September 1946

All 67 seats in the National Assembly 34 seats needed for a majority
- Turnout: 60%
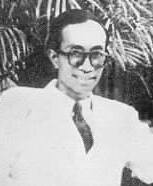

	First party	Second party
Leader	Sisowath Youtevong	Norodom Norindeth
Party	Democratic	Liberal
Seats won	50	14
A map presenting the results of the election, by party elected from each constituency
- Democratic
Elected Prime Minister
Sisowath Youtevong
Democratic

General elections were held for the first time in Cambodia on 1 September 1946. The Democratic Party won 50 of the 67 seats, with voter turnout estimated to be 60%.

== Results ==
Party	Seats
Democratic Party	50
Liberal Party	14
Independents	3
Total	67
Source: Nohlen et al.
