= Ieu Koeus =

9th Prime Minister of Cambodia

- អៀវ កើស
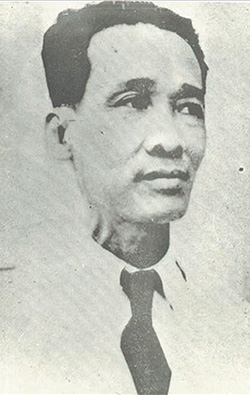

Prime Minister of Cambodia
- In office 20 September 1949 – 29 September 1949
- Monarch: Norodom Sihanouk
- Preceded by: Yem Sambaur
- Succeeded by: Yem Sambaur

President of the National Assembly of Cambodia
- In office 1946–1949
- Monarch: Norodom Sihanouk
- Succeeded by: ?

Personal details
- Born: 1905 Sangkae District, Phra Tabong Province, Rattanakosin Kingdom
- Died: 14 January 1950 (aged 44–45) Phnom Penh, Cambodia, French Indochina
- Party: Democratic
- Children: Ieu Pannakar

Ieu Koeus (Note: Khmer: អៀវ កើស, romanized: Iaw Kaoeh; Khmer pronunciation: [iəw kaəh]) (1905 – 14 January 1950) was a Cambodian politician. He served as President of the National Assembly of Cambodia from 1946 to 1949, and as Prime Minister of Cambodia for nine days in September 1949. Considered an intellectual, he was instrumental in the formation of the Cambodian Democratic Party in April 1946, created a self-declared government on September 20, 1949, was replaced by Yem Sambaur on September 29.

On 14 January 1950, a hand grenade was thrown into the party headquarters, fatally wounding Koeus, who led the National Union Movement. The man throwing the grenade was captured and arrested, admitting, then later denying, that he was a member of the opposing Liberal party. Blame for the assassination, however, varies from the French, King Sihanouk, Yem Sambaur, and rebel Issaraks with little evidence available. Koeus' son Ieu Pannakar was a Cambodian senator.
