= Penn Nouth =

7th prime minister of Cambodia

Samdech Penn Nouth
- ប៉ែន នុត
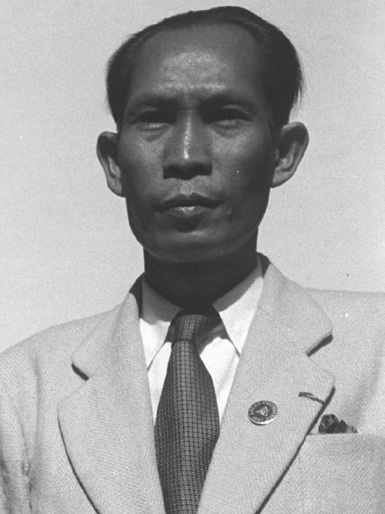
- Nouth in 1947

Prime Minister of Cambodia
- In office 17 April 1975 – 4 April 1976
- President: Norodom Sihanouk
- Preceded by: Long Boret
- Succeeded by: Khieu Samphan (acting)
- In office 31 January 1968 – 14 August 1969
- Monarch: Sisowath Kossamak
- President: Norodom Sihanouk
- Preceded by: Son Sann
- Succeeded by: Lon Nol
- In office 28 January 1961 – 17 November 1961
- Monarch: Sisowath Kossamak
- President: Norodom Sihanouk
- Preceded by: Pho Proeung
- Succeeded by: Norodom Sihanouk
- In office 17 January 1958 – 24 April 1958
- Monarch: Norodom Suramarit
- Preceded by: Ek Yi Oun
- Succeeded by: Sim Var
- In office 18 April 1954 – 26 January 1955
- Monarch: Norodom Sihanouk
- Preceded by: Norodom Sihanouk
- Succeeded by: Leng Ngeth
- In office 24 January 1953 – 22 November 1953
- Monarch: Norodom Sihanouk
- Preceded by: Norodom Sihanouk
- Succeeded by: Chan Nak
- In office 15 August 1948 – 21 January 1949
- Monarch: Norodom Sihanouk
- Preceded by: Chhean Vam
- Succeeded by: Yem Sambaur

Minister of Foreign Affairs
- In office 11 January 1958 – 10 July 1958
- Prime Minister: Ek Yi Oun; Sim Var
- Preceded by: Sim Var
- Succeeded by: Truong Cang

Personal details
- Born: 15 April 1906 Phnom Penh, Cambodia, French Indochina
- Died: 18 May 1985 (aged 79) Châtenay-Malabry, France
- Party: National United Front of Kampuchea (1970–1976); Sangkum (1955–1970); Democratic (1946–1955)

Penn Nouth (Khmer: ប៉ែន នុត; April 15, 1906 – May 18, 1985) was a Cambodian politician. He served in the French colonial administration, then took active part in Cambodian politics, was several times Prime Minister of Cambodia (1953, 1954–1955, 1958, 1961) as part of the Sangkum regime of Prince Norodom Sihanouk. He was the first prime minister of an independent Cambodia. He was prime minister for the sixth time from 31 January 1968 to August 14th 1969. On March 18th 1970, when Norodom Sihanouk was deposed by Penn Nouth's successor Lon Nol, Penn Nouth joined the monarch in his exile and became prime minister in the GRUNK coalition. His combined tenure as prime minister (5 years, 222 days), spanning seven non-consecutive terms, is the second-longest in Cambodian history after Hun Sen.

On April 17, 1975, when the Khmer Rouge took power, he held the post of prime minister for Sihanouk for the last time, but without holding any power, Democratic Kampuchea being entirely controlled by Pol Pot's supporters. He was subsequently placed under house arrest after Sihanouk resigned on 5th April 1976, until January 6, 1979, when, following his release during the Vietnamese invasion, he returned to the People's Republic of China.

He emigrated to Châtenay-Malabry in France, where he obtained refugee status on March 6, 1981, and where he died on May 18, 1985, at age 79.

== Honour ==
=== Foreign honour ===
- Malaya : Honorary Commander of the Order of the Defender of the Realm (1963)

Political offices
| Preceded by Son Sann | Prime Minister of Cambodia; 1968–1969 | Succeeded by Lon Nol |
| Preceded by Long Boret | Prime Minister of Democratic Kampuchea; 17 April 1975–4 April 1976 | Succeeded by Khieu Samphan |
