= Huy Kanthoul =

12th Prime Minister of Cambodia

- ហ៊ុយ កន្ធុល

Prime Minister of Cambodia
- In office 13 October 1951 – 16 June 1952
- Monarch: Norodom Sihanouk
- Preceded by: Oum Chheang Sun
- Succeeded by: Norodom Sihanouk

Personal details
- Born: 1 February 1909 Phnom Penh, Cambodia, French Indochina
- Died: 13 September 1991 (aged 82) Paris, France
- Party: Democratic Party

Huy Kanthoul (Khmer: ហ៊ុយ កន្ធុល; 1 February 1909 – 13 September 1991) was the Prime Minister of Cambodia from 1951 to 1952.
