= Chhean Vam =

6th Prime Minister of Cambodia

- ឈាន វ៉ម

Prime Minister of Cambodia
- In office 20 February 1948 – 14 August 1948
- Monarch: Norodom Sihanouk
- Preceded by: Sisowath Watchayavong
- Succeeded by: Penn Nouth

Minister of Defence
- In office 1948–1949

Personal details
- Born: 19 April 1916 Battambang, Cambodia
- Died: 19 January 2000 (aged 83) Paris, France
- Party: Democratic Party

Chhean Vam (Khmer: ឈាន វ៉ម; 19 April 1916 – 19 January 2000) was a Cambodian politician and nationalist. He was Prime Minister of Cambodia from February to August 1948. He was a co-founder of the Democratic Party in 1946.

Political offices
Preceded by Sisowath Watchayavong	Prime Minister of Cambodia; 1948	Succeeded by Penn Nouth
