= Sisowath Monireth =

Prime Minister of Cambodia from 1945 to 1946

Sisowath Monireth, Crown Prince of Cambodia
- ស៊ីសុវត្ថិ មុនី្នរ៉េត
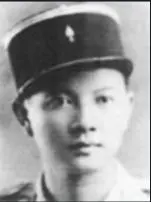
- Monireth in 1940

President of the Regency Council
- Acting; 6 April 1960 – 13 June 1960
- Prime Minister: Norodom Sihanouk; Pho Proeung
- Preceded by: Chuop Hell (acting) as Chief of State
- Succeeded by: Chuop Hell (acting) as Chief of State

Prime Minister of Cambodia
- In office 17 October 1945 – 15 December 1946
- Monarch: Norodom Sihanouk
- Preceded by: Son Ngoc Thanh
- Succeeded by: Sisowath Youtevong

Personal details
- Born: 25 November 1909 Phnom Penh, Cambodia, French Indochina
- Died: September 1975 (aged 65) Kampuchea
- Party: Sangkum (1955–70)
- Other political affiliations: Independent (1945–55; 1970–75)
- Spouse: Pok Rosette Vani
- Children: See list: Sisowath Rethnara; Sisowath Rakmoni; Sisowath Monisowath; Sisowath Pongmoni
- Parents: Sisowath Monivong (father); Norodom Kanviman Norleak Tevi (mother)
- Awards: Legion of Honour; Croix de guerre
- House: Sisowath

Military service
- Allegiance: French Third Republic; Free France
- Branch/service: French Foreign Legion; 5th Foreign Infantry Regiment
- Years of service: 1939–1945
- Battles/wars: World War II

Sisowath Monireth (Note: Khmer: ស៊ីសុវត្ថិ មុន្នីរ៉េត, Sisŏwăt Mŭniret; Khmer pronunciation: [siː.so.ʋat mu.ni.reːt]), (25 November 1909–September 1975) was a Cambodian politician who served as the Prime Minister of Cambodia, during the French protectorate period, from 17 October 1945 to 15 December 1946. One of the most prominent members of the Sisowath line of the royal family at the time, he had earlier been passed over for the throne by the French authorities in favor of his nephew Norodom Sihanouk, whom they considered to be more pliable. The prince, however, remained heir to the throne under Sihanouk's reign.

From 1939 to 1945, he fought for France in World War II.

== Early life ==
The original Cambodian Scout movement Ankar Khamarak Kayarith was created in 1934, under the direction of Prince Sisowath Monireth and other leaders, including Tem Im and Pok Thiem. This first era of Cambodian Scouting spread over several provinces and numbered more than 1,000 members.

== Period in office ==
One of his first acts as Prime Minister was to create the first modern Cambodian army. Having won the consent of the French, who had just returned to power in Cambodia after the defeat of the Japanese in World War II, Monireth succeeded in forming out of former colonial NCOs the basis for an indigenous army whose mission, according to the Franco-Khmer Military Convention of 20 November 1946, was to uphold the sovereignty of the king, to preserve internal security, and to defend the frontiers of the country.

In later years, Monireth temporarily acted as head of state from 6 April to 13 June 1960 in his capacity as President of the Regency Council.

In 1975, he was executed by the Khmer Rouge under Angkar's regime after the Fall of Phnom Penh.

Sisowath Monireth House of Sisowath Born: 9 November 1909 Died: September 1975
Political offices
Preceded by Chuop Hell (acting)	Chairman of the Regency Council (acting); 1960	Succeeded by Chuop Hell (acting)
Preceded by Sơn Ngọc Thành	Prime Minister of Cambodia; 1945–1946	Succeeded by Sisowath Youtevong
