= Democratic Party (Cambodia) =

Political party in Cambodia (1946–1957)

Democratic Party ក្រុមប្រជាធិបតេយ្យ Krŏm Prâchiathĭpătăi Parti démocrate
- Secretary-General: Ieu Koeus; Norodom Phurissara
- Founders: Chhean Vam; Ieu Koeus; Sim Var; Sisowath Youtevong
- Founded: April 1946
- Dissolved: August 1957
- Split from: French Section of the Workers' International
- Headquarters: Phnom Penh
- Ideology: Until 1957: Khmer nationalism; Anti-imperialism; Socialism Factions: Communism; Marxism; Until 1954: Khmer nationalism; Social democracy; Democratic socialism
- Political position: Left-wing
- Slogan: "សន្តិភាព ឯករាជ្យ វិន័យ និងភាពក្លាហាន" (English: "Peace, Independence, Discipline and Courage")

Election symbol
- Elephant's head and three lotus flowers

The Democratic Party (Khmer: ក្រុមប្រជាធិបតេយ្យ, romanized: Krŏm Prâchiathĭpătăi, lit. 'democratic party'; French: Parti démocrate), commonly referred to as The Democrats, was a left-wing pro-independence political party formed in 1946 by Prince Sisowath Youtevong, who had previously been a member of the French Section of the Workers' International. It was the sole dominant party in Cambodia from 1946 until the creation of Sangkum in 1955.

Its slogan was "Peace, Independence, Discipline and Courage", and its electoral symbol was an elephant's head and three lotus flowers.

== In the colonial-era government ==
In the first elections to colonial Cambodia's Constituent Assembly, held in September 1946, in which the Democrats won 50 out of 67 seats. The party is notably accredited for its introduction of democratic values in Cambodia, especially with the adoption of the country’s first constitution which was promulgated on May 6, 1947, that transitioned Cambodia from an absolute monarchy to a Western-style parliamentary constitutional monarchy, almost identical to the constitution of the French Fourth Republic. The Democrats largely modeled their values on the French Section of the Workers’ International, believing in democracy, essential freedoms, and a combination of social and private ownership. According to Youtevong, and his peer Thonn Ouk, freedom was a necessary attribute of human dignity, and it can be provided through a parliamentary system. Youtevong stipulated that the constitution was the supreme law of the land and that it gave Cambodia a government that serves the people. The Democrats - in contrast to their rivals, the Liberal Party (Kanak Sereipheap) of Prince Norodom Norindeth and the Progressive Democrats led by Prince Norodom Montana - were in favor of immediate independence through democratic means; they also maintained that the Thai-sponsored Khmer Issarak resistance were patriots, thereby irritating the French. In July 1947, Sisowath Youtevong died, his death is still unknown with people speculating illness or assassination by French spys or even his fellow party members. This was a major setback for the Democratic Party and would begin to cause internal division, mainly causing corrupt revolving door governments due to disagreements on government positions (later influencing the radicalization of the party). Despite these issues, the Democratic Party still remained the most popular party in Cambodia until 1955.

The party was to sweep the 1947 National Assembly elections, assisted by an enthusiastic team of activists (including a young Saloth Sar, later to become known as Pol Pot, and Ieng Sary). Other prominent figures associated with the Democrats in this period were centrist In Tam and leftist Hu Nim, another future Khmer Rouge cadre.

The defection of Yem Sambaur and several other deputies to the Liberals in 1948 and the subsequent assassination of Democrat leader Ieu Koeus in 1950 by a member of Norindeth's entourage led to a period of massive fragmentation and division in the party. However, despite the temporary ascendancy of the Liberals, the Democrats continued to attract many members of the Khmer intellectual elite in the period leading up to and immediately following Cambodian independence in 1953, and retained particular support amongst civil servants and the urban educated classes. Son Ngoc Thanh, a former Prime Minister under the Japanese occupation, was also to join the Democrats between 1951 and 1952, when he left for the forests of northern Cambodia to start a right-leaning independence movement.

In 1951, the Democratic Party once again won the general elections, and Huy Kanthol proceeded as Prime Minister. However, his administration had become authoritarian with frequent suppression and arrests of those opposed to the Democratic Party, as well as an extreme opposition to French authorities. Due to the sensitive situation, King Norodom Sihanouk, at the motion of the cabinet council, dissolved the National Assembly and dismissed Kanthol’s administration. In accordance with the 1947 constitution, this act was unconstitutional. These events are viewed as one of the major downfalls of the Democratic Party

== Radicalization and post-independence defeat ==
During 1954, the party moved leftwards, under the influence of Paris-educated political radicals led by Keng Vannsak, who was Pol Pot’s mentor; Prince Norodom Phurissara became its secretary-general. At this stage, its stance emphasized the importance of the 1954 Geneva Conference in guaranteeing independence and the undesirability of accepting American aid as a result (a position similar to that of the rival socialist Pracheachon party).

In 1955 King Norodom Sihanouk abdicated and set up an anti-communist political movement, the Sangkum, to participate in the 1955 general elections; some prominent Democrats (such as Penn Nouth) left the party and joined Sihanouk. Keng Vannsak was fired at by government (i.e., Sangkum) agents at a rally on the eve of the poll, and jailed during the voting, while the party's office in Battambang was ransacked. The Democrats eventually gained 12% of the vote, while the Sangkum won 82% and all seats.

In August 1957, the Democratic Party dissolved itself. According to notes left by Prince Sisowath Monireth, this happened after the remaining leaders were called for a "friendly conference" with Sihanouk and were beaten up by Lon Nol's police on departure.

== Re-establishment by In Tam ==
After Lon Nol deposed Sihanouk in the Cambodian coup of 1970 and the subsequent establishment of the Khmer Republic, the Democratic Party was re-established by In Tam, who was one of the coup leaders. However, the manipulation of the 1972 parliamentary elections by Nol and his brother Lon Non meant that the Democrats refused to participate. In Tam was later to retire from politics, the party being led by Chau Sau; during this period, it also made overtures to exiled politician Son Sann. The Democrats, however, gained no further political power before the Khmer Republic itself collapsed in 1975, and the Khmer Rouge established Democratic Kampuchea.

In Tam, after a period in which he was once more associated with the royalists under Sihanouk, was to re-establish a Democratic Party after the 1991 peace settlement in Cambodia. The party competed in the 1993 elections but failed to win any seats.

== General election results ==
Election	Party leader	Votes			Seats		Position	Government
Election	Party leader	#	%	±	#	±	Position	Government
1946	Sisowath Youtevong	—N/a	73.0%	New	50 / 67	New	▲1st	Democratic
1947	Sisowath Watchayavong	—N/a	—N/a	—N/a	44 / 75	▼6	1st	Democratic
1951	Huy Kanthoul	—N/a	—N/a	—N/a	54 / 78	▲10	1st	Democratic
1955	Norodom Phurissara	93,921	12.3%	▼	0 / 91	▼54	▼2nd	Sangkum
