= Sisowath Youtevong =

4th Prime Minister of Cambodia

His Royal Highness Prince Sisowath Youtevong
- ស៊ីសុវត្ថិ យុត្តិវង្ស
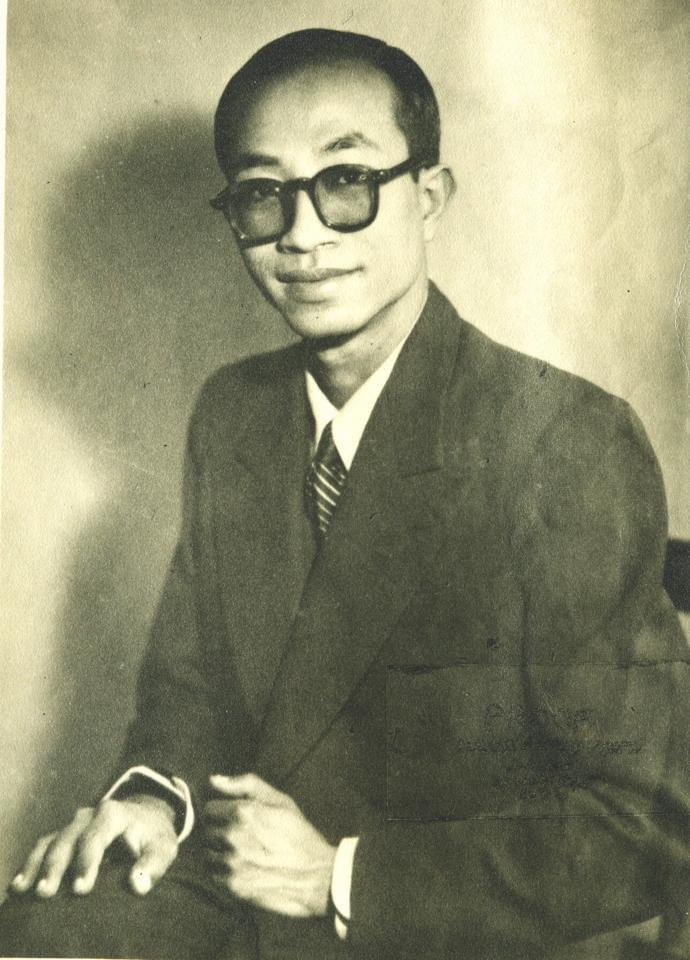
- Youtevong, circa late 1930s

Prime Minister of Cambodia
- In office 15 December 1946 – 17 July 1947
- Monarch: Norodom Sihanouk
- Preceded by: Sisowath Monireth
- Succeeded by: Sisowath Watchayavong

Leader of the Democratic Party
- In office June 1946 – July 1947

Personal details
- Born: 1913 Oudong, Cambodia, French Indochina
- Died: 17 July 1947 (aged 33–34) Phnom Penh, Cambodia, French Indochina
- Party: Democratic
- Other political affiliations: French Section of the Workers' International
- Spouse: Dominique Laverne
- Children: 2
- Parent(s): Sisowath Chamraengvongs; Sisowath Yubhiphan
- Education: University of Montpellier (PhD)
- House: House of Sisowath

Sisowath Youtevong (Note: Khmer: ស៊ីសុវត្ថិ យុត្តិវង្ស, romanized: Sisŏvăt Yŭttĕvǒng; Khmer pronunciation: [siː.so.ʋat jut.te.vɔŋ]) (Note: His full title is, Khmer: អ្នកអង្គម្ចាស់ ស៊ីសុវត្ថិ យុត្តិវង្ស, romanized: Neăk Ǎng Mchăh Sisŏvăt Yŭttĕvǒng; Khmer pronunciation: [neək ɑŋ mcah siː.so.ʋat jut.te.vɔŋ]) (1913 – 17 July 1947) was a Cambodian prince, politician and mathematician, credited as the "Father of Cambodian Democracy", and a member of the Democratic Party. He served as the fourth Prime Minister of Cambodia from December 1946 to July 1947. He was the first to be elected prime minister.

== Biography ==
Sisowath Youtevong was born in 1913 in Udong, Cambodia, as the son of Prince Chamraengvongs (1870–1916) and Princess Sisowath Yubhiphan (1877–1967). He studied at a science university in France and received a certificate of mathematics in 1941. He was also a member of the French Section of the Workers' International, the predecessor to the present-day Socialist Party. He would later go on to be elected as President of the newly founded Democratic Party of Cambodia in April 1946. Youtevong was the principal author of the constitution at that time, which was put to use on 6 May 1947. He led the Democratic Party to victory in the elections on 1 September 1946 and was sworn in as Prime Minister on 15 December 1946. Prince Sisowath Youtevong died on 17 July 1947, at Calmette Hospital, Phnom Penh, and was succeeded by Sisowath Watchayavong.

== Personal life ==
Sisowath Youtevong was married to a French woman named Dominique Laverne and had two daughters: Sisowath Kantara (born 1945) and Sisowath Lenanda (born 1946).

== Notes ==
Political offices
Preceded by Sisowath Monireth	Prime Minister of Cambodia; 1946–1947	Succeeded by Sisowath Watchayavong
