= Prime Minister of Cambodia =

Head of government

Prime Minister of the Kingdom of Cambodia
- នាយករដ្ឋមន្រ្តី
- Seal of the Cabinet of Cambodia

- Flag of Cambodia

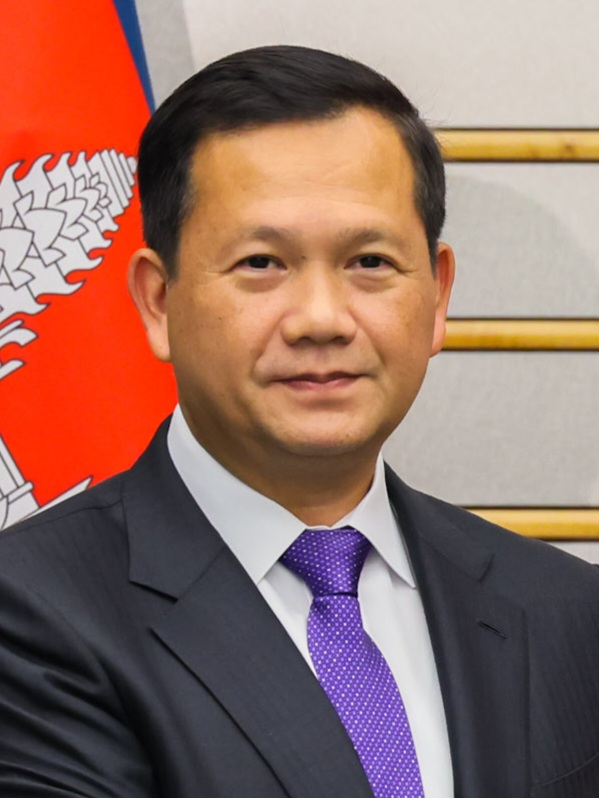
- Incumbent; Hun Manet since 22 August 2023
- Office of the Council of Ministers; Royal Government of Cambodia; Office of the Prime Minister
- Style: Mr. Prime Minister (informal); His Excellency (formal, diplomatic); Samdech (official, formal)
- Type: Head of government; Commander-in-chief (de facto); Historical: Commander-in-Chief (1981–1992)
- Member of: Council of Ministers; Royal Council of the Throne
- Reports to: National Assembly
- Residence: Peace Palace
- Seat: Phnom Penh
- Nominator: Largest political party in parliament
- Appointer: Monarch by royal decree
- Term length: Five years, renewable, no term limits
- Constituting instrument: Constitution of Cambodia
- Formation: 18 March 1945; 81 years ago
- First holder: Norodom Sihanouk
- Deputy: Deputy Prime Minister
- Salary: 10,000,000 KHR/US$ 2,490 per month
- Website: en.cmf-cnv.org.kh

The prime minister of Cambodia (Khmer: នាយករដ្ឋមន្ត្រី, UNGEGN: Néayôk Rôdthâmôntrei, pronounced [niəjuək rɔəttʰamɔntrəj]; literally 'chief minister') is the head of government of Cambodia. The prime minister is also the chairman of the Cabinet and leads the executive branch of the Royal Government of Cambodia. The prime minister is a member of parliament, and is appointed by the monarch for a term of five years. Since 1945, 37 individuals have served as prime minister; 33 as official prime ministers, and 4 in acting capacities. The current prime minister since 2023 is Hun Manet.

== History ==
The position was first held by King Norodom Sihanouk in March 1945, during the French colonial administration. On 13 March 1945, Sihanouk collaborated with Imperial Japan and declared Cambodia's independence from France. On 18 March, he proclaimed himself prime minister and formed the first government which lasted until August 1945. He was succeeded by Son Ngoc Thanh until October 1945. Following the surrender of Japan, the French administration returned, ending the Japanese occupation.

In 1946, France introduced reforms into its colonies in Indochina, and allowed for the first time political parties and parliamentary elections. Cambodia's first parliamentary elections were held on 1 September 1946. The Democratic Party remained the dominant-party in Cambodian politics throughout the 1940s until the formation of the Sangkum in 1955. Sangkum was the only legal party in Cambodia from 1955 to 1970 until a military coup by Marshal Lon Nol.

In 1993, constitutional monarchy was restored in Cambodia. The role of the prime minister was officially recognised in the constitution. Prince Norodom Ranariddh was considered the first democratically elected prime minister in a United Nations sponsored election. The CPP–FUNCINPEC coalition agreement of 1993 marked a brief period in Cambodia where Hun Sen and Prince Norodom Ranariddh were coequal Prime Ministers. In 1997, Hun Sen staged a coup that removed Ranariddh from office. The National Assembly voted to confirm Ung Huot to complete the remainder of Ranariddh's term. The 1998 election and every election since has been dominated by Hun Sen and the CPP. Unlike most parliamentary democracies, the prime minister serves a fixed five-year term in office, and does not have the power to call a snap election nor dissolve parliament prematurely.

== Appointment ==
The prime minister is required to be a member of parliament. He first needs to be elected by a majority of parliament before a swearing-in ceremony can take place. The inauguration of the prime minister takes place at the Royal Palace. The prime minister-designate takes an oath of office in front of the monarch and the two heads of the Thammayut and Mohanikay order. A cabinet will then be unveiled. The formation of a new government takes place no more than 60 days after the election, as defined in the constitution. The prime minister is assisted by deputy prime ministers.

Article 125 of the Constitution states that should the prime minister resign or die in office, an acting prime minister is appointed. In July 2022, the constitution was amended to eliminate the required majority vote in parliament to elect the prime minister.

== Office ==
The Prime Minister's Office

The Peace Palace serves as the principal workplace of the prime minister. It was inaugurated on 19 October 2010 by the King. However, the prime minister resides at his own private residence.

== Constitutional powers ==
The powers of the prime minister are established by the current Constitution of Cambodia, adopted on 24 September 1993 and amended on 4 March 1999. They are defined by the following articles of the Constitution:

- Article 11: If the King can not perform its normal functions of head of state because of a serious illness certified by a group of medical experts appointed by the President of the Senate, the Speaker of the Assembly and the Prime Minister, the President of the Senate shall serve as head of state in place of King as Regent.
- Article 13: Within seven days at most – after the vacancy of the throne – the new King of Cambodia is selected by the Throne Council. Council members include the following:
  - The President of the Senate
  - The President of the Assembly
  - Prime Minister
  - The leaders of two religious orders, Thammayut and Mohanikay
  - First and second vice president of the Senate
  - First and second vice president of the Assembly.
- Article 19: The King appoints the Prime Minister and the Council of Ministers as provided for in section 119.
- Article 20: The King receives the Prime Minister and the Cabinet in official audience twice a month to inquire about the situation of the country.
- Article 22: When the nation is in danger, the King publicly declared state of emergency with the approval of the Prime Minister, the President of the National Assembly and the Senate President.
- Article 78: .... The National Assembly may be dissolved before the end of its term except when the royal government was overthrown twice during a twelve-month period. In this case, the King shall, upon proposal of the Prime Minister and with the consent of the President of the National Assembly, dissolved the National Assembly. ...
- Article 83: ... Each session of the National Assembly last at least three months. At the request of the King or the Prime Minister's or a third of the members of the National Assembly, the Standing Committee of the Assembly shall convene the National Assembly for a special session. ...
- Article 88: Meetings of the National Assembly are public. The National Assembly may meet in closed session at the request of the President or at least one tenth of its members, at the request of the king or at the request of the Prime Minister. ...
- Article 91: Senators, MPs and the Prime Minister has the legislative initiative.
- Article 96: Members have the right to question the royal government. The questions are written and transmitted through the President of the National Assembly. Answers are provided by one or several ministers depending on whether the problem concerns the responsibility of one or several ministers. If the problem is the policy of the Royal Government, the Prime Minister must answer in person. The answers of the Minister or the Prime Minister are oral or written. The above answers are given within a period of seven days after receiving the questions. If the answer is oral, the president of the National Assembly may decide whether or not to open the debate. If it does not allow for debate, the answers of the Minister or the Prime Minister put an end to questions. If it authorizes the opening of a debate, the questioners, the other speakers, the minister in question or the Prime Minister to discuss and exchange views in a period not exceeding one session.
- Article 107: The Senate shall meet in ordinary session twice a year. Each session lasts at least three months. At the request of the King or the proposal of the Prime Minister or at least a third of its members, the Senate summoned its members for a special session.
- Article 111: The Senate hearings are public. The Senate may meet in closed session at the request of the President or at least one tenth of its members, at the request of the King, at the request of the Prime Minister or at the request of the President of the National Assembly.
- Article 118: The Council of Ministers is the Royal Government of Cambodia. The Council of Ministers is headed by a Prime Minister, assisted by vice prime ministers and ministers of state, ministers and state secretaries as members.
- Article 119: On the proposal of the President and with the assent of the two vice-presidents of the National Assembly, the King means a person among the members of the winning party in elections to form the Royal Government. The person appointed, along with colleagues who are MPs or party members are represented in the National Assembly responsible for ministerial posts in the royal government, seeking the confidence of the National Assembly. When the National Assembly voted confidence, the King signs the Kret appointment of the entire Cabinet. Before his grafted in office, the Council of Ministers shall take an oath under the terms provided in Annex 6.
- Article 121. All members of the Royal Government are collectively responsible to the National Assembly of the general policy of the royal government. Each member of the Royal Government is individually responsible to the Prime Minister and the National Assembly of the acts he committed.
- Article 123: The Cabinet meets every week in plenary session or work session. The plenary session was chaired by the Prime Minister. The Prime Minister may delegate to the Deputy Prime Minister chairing meetings. All minutes of meetings of the Council of Ministers must be forwarded to the King for his information.
- Article 124: The Prime Minister may delegate its powers to deputy prime minister or a member of the royal government.
- Article 125: When the position of Prime Minister is permanently vacant, must be carried to the appointment of a new Council of Ministers as provided for in this constitution. If the vacancy is temporary, an acting Prime Minister is temporarily appointed.
- Article 140: The King, the Prime Minister, the President of the National Assembly or one tenth of the deputies, the President of the Senate or one quarter of senators, may refer the laws passed by the National Assembly to the Constitutional Council for review before promulgation. The Rules of Procedure of the National Assembly, the Rules of the Senate and the organic laws must be submitted to the Constitutional Council for review before promulgation. The Constitutional Council shall decide, within 30 days on the compliance or non-compliance of these laws or rules of the Assembly and the Senate with the constitution.
- Article 141: After enactment of a law, the King, the chairman of the Senate, the president of the National Assembly, the Prime Minister, one quarter of the Senate, one tenth of the deputies or the courts may ask the Constitutional Council to determine the constitutionality of this law. A citizen has the right to challenge the constitutionality of laws through the Parliament or the President of the National Assembly or the Senate or the President of the Senate as provided in the preceding paragraph.
- Article 148: The National Convention meets once a year, in early December at the call of Prime Minister. The national conference is held under the chairmanship of the King.
- Article 151: The initiative of the revision or amendment of the constitution belongs to the King, the Prime Minister and the President of the National Assembly, on proposal of one fourth of all members of the Assembly National. Revision or amendment of the constitution must be done by a constitutional law voted by the National Assembly by a majority of two thirds of all members of the National Assembly.

== List of prime ministers of Cambodia ==
The following is a list of prime ministers of Cambodia after the restoration of the monarchy in 1993.

| Number | Portrait | Prime minister | Term of office | | | Political party | Mandate | Monarch Reign |
| Number | Portrait | Prime minister | Start | End | Duration | Political party | Mandate | Monarch Reign |
|---|---|---|---|---|---|---|---|---|
| 1 | | Norodom Ranariddh នរោត្តម រណឫទ្ធិ (1944–2021) | 2 July 1993 | 6 August 1997 | 4 years, 35 days | FUNCINPEC | 1993 | Norodom Sihanouk r. 1993–2004 |
| 2 | | Hun Sen ហ៊ុន សែន (born 1952) | 2 July 1993 | 30 November 1998 | 5 years, 151 days | CPP | 1993 | Norodom Sihanouk r. 1993–2004 |
| 3 | | Ung Huot អ៊ឹង ហួត (born 1945) | 6 August 1997 | 30 November 1998 | 1 year, 116 days | FUNCINPEC | —N/a | Norodom Sihanouk r. 1993–2004 |
| (2) | | Hun Sen ហ៊ុន សែន (born 1952) | 30 November 1998 | 22 August 2023 | 24 years, 265 days | CPP | 1998 | Norodom Sihanouk r. 1993–2004 |
| (2) | | Hun Sen ហ៊ុន សែន (born 1952) | 30 November 1998 | 22 August 2023 | 24 years, 265 days | CPP | 2003 | Norodom Sihanouk r. 1993–2004 |
| (2) | | Hun Sen ហ៊ុន សែន (born 1952) | 30 November 1998 | 22 August 2023 | 24 years, 265 days | CPP | 2008 | |
| (2) | | Hun Sen ហ៊ុន សែន (born 1952) | 30 November 1998 | 22 August 2023 | 24 years, 265 days | CPP | 2008 | Norodom Sihamoni r. 2004–present |
| (2) | | Hun Sen ហ៊ុន សែន (born 1952) | 30 November 1998 | 22 August 2023 | 24 years, 265 days | CPP | 2013 | Norodom Sihamoni r. 2004–present |
| (2) | | Hun Sen ហ៊ុន សែន (born 1952) | 30 November 1998 | 22 August 2023 | 24 years, 265 days | CPP | 2018 | Norodom Sihamoni r. 2004–present |
| 4 | | Hun Manet ហ៊ុន ម៉ាណែត (born 1977) | 22 August 2023 | Incumbent | 3 years, 68 days | CPP | 2023 | Norodom Sihamoni r. 2004–present |

== Deputy Prime Minister of Cambodia ==
The deputy prime minister of Cambodia (Khmer: ឧបនាយករដ្ឋមន្ត្រី, Ŏbânéayôk Rôdthâmôntrei [upaniəjuək rɔətmuntrəj]) serves as the deputy to the prime minister of Cambodia and is the second most senior position in the Cabinet. As of November 2024, the prime minister is served by 12 deputy prime ministers concurrently.

| Name | Appointed | Ministerial positions |
|---|---|---|
| Aun Pornmoniroth | 6 September 2018 | Minister of Economy and Finance (2013–present) |
| Vongsey Vissoth | 22 August 2023 | Minister in charge of the Office of the Council of Ministers (2023–present) |
| Sar Sokha | 22 August 2023 | Minister of Interior (2023–present) |
| Tea Seiha | 22 August 2023 | Minister of National Defence (2023–present) |
| Hangchuon Naron | 22 August 2023 | Minister of Education, Youth and Sport (2013–present) |
| Sok Chenda Sophea | 22 August 2023 | Minister of Foreign Affairs and International Cooperation (2023–2024) |
| Keut Rith | 22 August 2023 | Minister of Justice (2020–present) |
| Say Sam Al | 22 August 2023 | Minister of Land Management, Urban Planning and Construction (2023–present); Minister of Environment (2013–2023) |
| Neth Savoeun | 22 August 2023 | None |
| Sun Chanthol | 22 August 2023 | None; Minister of Public Works and Transport (2004–2008; 2016–2023); Minister of Commerce (2013–2016) |
| Hun Many | 21 February 2024 | Minister of Civil Service (2023–present) |
| Prak Sokhonn | 20 November 2024 | Minister of Foreign Affairs and International Cooperation (2024–present) |

== See also ==
- List of kings of Cambodia
- List of heads of state of Cambodia
- Cabinet of Cambodia
- Leader of the Opposition
