= Norodom =

Norodom (Khmer: នរោត្តម) is a dynastic Cambodian surname. It is derived from the Sanskrit word narottama (Sanskrit: नरोत्तम, lit. 'best of men'). People with the name include:

- Norodom of Cambodia (1834–1904), King of Cambodia (1860–1904)
- Norodom Arunrasmy (born 1955), Cambodian princess
- Norodom Buppha Devi (1943–2019), Cambodian princess
- Norodom Chakrapong (born 1945), Cambodian prince and politician
- Norodom Chakravuth (born 1970), Cambodian royal and politician
- Norodom Chantaraingsey (born 1924 or 1926; died 1976), Cambodian prince and nationalist
- Norodom Duong Chakr (1861–1897), Cambodian prince
- Norodom Ekcharin (born 1969), Cambodian prince; second son of Prince Norodom Yuvaneath
- Norodom Jenna (born 2012), Cambodian princess
- Norodom Kantol (1920–1976), Cambodian royal and Prime Minister (1962–1966)
- Norodom Marie (born 1948), Cambodian princess
- Norodom Monineath (born 1936), Queen mother of Cambodia
- Norodom Montana (1902–1975), Cambodian politician
- Norodom Naradipo (1946–1976), Cambodian prince
- Norodom Narindrapong (1954–2003), Cambodian prince
- Norodom Norindeth (c. 1906–1975), Cambodian royal and politician
- Norodom Phurissara (1919–1976), Cambodian royal and politician
- Norodom Pongsoriya (born 1997), Cambodian princess
- Norodom Preysophon (born 1954), Cambodian prince
- Norodom Ranariddh (1944–2021), Cambodian prime minister (1998–2006) and royal
- Norodom Rattana Devi (born 1974), Cambodian princess
- Norodom Sihamoni (born 1953), King of Cambodia
- Norodom Sihanouk (1922–2012), King of Cambodia (1941–1955, 1993–2004)
- Norodom Sirivudh (born 1951), Cambodian royal and politician
- Norodom Suramarit (1896–1960), King of Cambodia (1955–1960)
- Norodom Vichara (1946–2013), Cambodian princess and politician
- Norodom Yukanthor (1860–1934), son of King Norodom of Cambodia (1834–1904)
- Norodom Yuvaneath (1943–2021), son of Norodom Sihanouk
- Soma Norodom (born 1969), Cambodian royal and newspaper columnist

== See also ==
- House of Norodom, royal house of Cambodia
