= Samdech =

Cambodian honorific

Samdech (Khmer: សម្តេច, UNGEGN: Sâmdéch, ALA-LC: Samṭec [sɑmɗac]) is a Cambodian honorific bestowed by the King of Cambodia to individuals deemed to have made significant contributions to the nation. It roughly translates as "lord". It is often accompanied by a longer title; for instance, Prime Minister Hun Sen's full title is Samṭec Aggamahasenāpaṭītejo Hun Sen or also called (Sâmdéch 'Âkkômôhasénéabâtei Techoŭ Hŭn Sên សម្តេច អគ្គមហាសេនាបតី តេជោ ហ៊ុន សែន meaning "Lord Supreme Military Commander Hun Sen"). Some members of the royal family and religious leaders also have "Samdech" as part of their title. In July 2016, the government ordered the media to use leaders' full titles.

The title used to be a rarity as under King Norodom Sihanouk's first reign (1941–1955), only four politicians had received the title including Penn Nouth, Nhiek Tioulong, Son Sann, and Chau Sen Cocsal Chhum, all of whom have served as prime minister.

== Known recipients ==
=== Monarchs ===
Name	Position	Full title
Norodom Sihamoni	King of Cambodia	Preah Karuna Preah Bat Samdech Preah Baromneath
Norodom Sihanouk	King Father of Cambodia	Preah Karuna Preah Bat Samdech Preah
Norodom Monineath	Queen Mother of Cambodia	Samdech Preah Mahaksatrey

=== Royalty ===
Name	Position	Full title
Norodom Buppha Devi	Princess of Cambodia	Samdech Reach Botrei Preah Ream
Norodom Yuvaneath	Prince of Cambodia	Samdech Preah Boromreamea
Norodom Ranariddh	Prince of Cambodia	Samdech Krom Preah
Norodom Chakrapong	Prince of Cambodia	Samdech Krom Preah
Norodom Arunrasmy	Princess of Cambodia	Samdech Reach Botrei Preah Anoch
Sisowath Pongneary Monipong	Princess of Cambodia	Samdech
Norodom Vichara	Princess of Cambodia	Samdech
Norodom Sirivudh	Prince of Cambodia	Samdech
Norodom Preysophon	Prince of Cambodia	Sdech Krom Khun

=== Religious leaders ===
Name	Position	Full title	Ref
Non Nget	Great Supreme Patriarch of Cambodia	Samdech Preah Agga Mahā Sangharājādhipati	
Bour Kry	Great Supreme Patriarch of Dhammayuttika Nikaya of Cambodia	Samdech Preah Abhisiri Sugandha Mahasangharajadhipati	
Am Limheng	President of Sangha Judicial Council of Mohanikaya Sect and President of Sangha Judicial Council Kingdom of Cambodia	Samdech Preah Maha Sumedhādhipatī Kittipundit	
Noy Jrek	First Vice President of Sangha Judicial Council of Mohanikaya Sect and President of Sangha Judicial Council Kingdom of Cambodia	Samdech Preah Podhivaing Kittipundit	
Moung Ra	Second Vice President of Sangha Judicial Council of Mohanikaya Sect and President of Sangha Judicial Council Kingdom of Cambodia	Samdech Preah Vornaroth	
Khem Sorn	Third Vice President of Sangha Judicial Council of Mohanikaya Sect and President of Sangha Judicial Council Kingdom of Cambodia	Samdech Preah Puth Cheymoni	

=== Politicians ===
Name	Position	Full title	Ref
Hun Sen	President of the Senate President of the Supreme Privy Council to His Majesty the King	Samdech Akka Moha Sena Padei Techo	
Khuon Sodary	President of the National Assembly	Samdech Moha Roatsapheathika Thipadei	
Hun Manet	Prime Minister of Cambodia	Samdech Moha Borvor Thipadei	
Kuy Sophal	Deputy Prime Minister, Minister of the Royal Palace	Samdech Mahamontrei	
Heng Samrin	Honorary President of the Supreme Privy Council to His Majesty the King	Samdech Akka Moha Ponhea Chakrey	
Say Chhum	Member of the Supreme Privy Council to His Majesty the King	Samdech Vibol Sena Pheakdey	
Sar Kheng	Member of the Supreme Privy Council to His Majesty the King	Samdech Kralahom	
Tea Banh	Member of the Supreme Privy Council to His Majesty the King	Samdech Pichey Sena	
Men Sam An	Member of the Supreme Privy Council to His Majesty the King	Samdech Kittisangahabandit	
Keat Chhon	Former Deputy Prime Minister, Minister of Economy and Finance	Samdech Sedthavithu Pheakdei	
Hor Namhong	Member of the Supreme Privy Council to His Majesty the King	Samdech Issara Wites Panha	
Bun Rany	President of the Cambodian Red Cross	Samdech Kittiprittbandit	
Sao Ty	Wife of Samdech Chakrey Hang Samrin	Samdech Thamavisutha Vongsa	
Chea Sim	Former President of the Senate	Samdech Akka Moha Thomma Pothisal	
Sok An	Former Deputy Prime Minister, Minister in charge of the Office of the Council of Ministers	Samdech Vibol Panha	
Kong Sam Ol	Former Deputy Prime Minister, Minister of the Royal Palace	Samdech Chaufea Veang Vorakveangchey Athippadey Sroengkea	
Hun Neng	Former Member of National Assembly	Samdech Oudom Tep Nhean	
Son Sann	Former Prime Minister of Cambodia	Samdech Borvor Setha Thipadei	
Nhiek Tioulong	Former Prime Minister of Cambodia	Samdech Chakrey Konhchara Thipadei	
Penn Nouth	Former Prime Minister of Cambodia	Samdech	
Chau Sen Cocsal Chhum	Former Prime Minister of Cambodia	Samdech	

== See also ==
- Supreme Patriarch of Cambodia
- Social class in Cambodia
- Lord
- Samdech Euv (disambiguation)
