= Euv =

Euv or EUV may refer to:

- Samdech Euv (1922–2012), King of Cambodia
  - Samdech Euv High School
  - Samdech Euv Autonomous Zone, a defunct secessionist movement
- Kaing Guek Euv (1942–2020), a Khmer Rouge leader
- Extreme ultraviolet (EUV)
  - Extreme ultraviolet lithography
- Electric utility vehicle, a sport utility vehicle that is an electric vehicle
  - Chevrolet Bolt EUV
- European University Viadrina
- Europa Universalis V, a video game by Paradox Interactive

== See also ==
- Samdech Euv (disambiguation)
