= Norodom Preysophon =

Cambodian prince

Norodom Preysophon នរោត្តម ប្រីយសោភ័ណ្ឌ
- Prince of Cambodia
- Prince Norodom Preysophon
- Born: 18 November 1954 (age 72); Phnom Penh, Cambodia
- House: Norodom
- Father: Norodom Suramarit
- Mother: Yeap Kim An
- Religion: Theravada Buddhism
- Occupation: Member of the Supreme Privy Council to His Majesty the King; Advisor to the Royal Secretariat of His Majesty the King

Styles of Norodom Preysophon
- Reference style: His Royal Highness
- Spoken style: Your Royal Highness

Norodom Preysophon (Khmer: នរោត្តម ប្រីយសោភ័ណ្ឌ, born 18 November 1954) is a Cambodian prince, a Member of the Supreme Privy Council to His Majesty the King of Cambodia, and an Advisor to the Royal Secretariat of His Majesty the King of Cambodia. He is the youngest son of King Norodom Suramarit and Lok Khun Tep Kanha Sophea Yeap Kim An, and thus the younger brother of Princess Norodom Vichara, Prince Norodom Sirivudh, and a half-brother of King Norodom Sihanouk.

His Royal Highness Prince Norodom Preysophon was appointed by His Majesty the King as a Member of the Senate, succeeding Princess Norodom Arunrasmy, who resigned from the position on 1 September 2019, until 2024. On 26 July 2023, His Majesty the King of the Kingdom of Cambodia graciously elevated His Royal Highness Prince Norodom Preysophon to the royal rank of Sdech Krom Khun Norodom Preysophon (Khmer: ស្ដេចក្រុមឃុន នរោត្តម ប្រីយសោភ័ណ្ឌ).
