= Sisowath Kossamak =

Queen of Cambodia (b. 1904 – d. 1975)

- Queen Sisowath Kossamak in 1965

Queen of Cambodia (Note: After the death of King Norodom Suramarit, his consort Queen Sisowath Kossamak served as monarch for ceremonial purposes only (as a "symbol, incarnation, and representative" of the dynasty), while the powers of head of state were delegated to her son Norodom Sihanouk, who was appointed "Chief of State" with powers equal to those of a monarch.)
- Reign: 20 June 1960 – 9 October 1970
- Predecessor: Norodom Suramarit
- Successor: Monarchy abolished
- Chief of State: Norodom Sihanouk; Cheng Heng (acting)

Queen consort of Cambodia
- Tenure: 2 March 1955 – 3 April 1960
- Coronation: 6 March 1956 with King Norodom Suramarit
- Born: 9 April 1904; Phnom Penh, Cambodia, French Indochina
- Died: 27 April 1975 (aged 71); Beijing, China
- Burial: September 1975; Silver Pagoda, Royal Palace, Phnom Penh, Cambodia
- Spouse: Norodom Suramarit (m. 1920; died 1960)
- Issue: Norodom Sihanouk
Names
- Sisowath Monivong Kossamak Nearirath Serey Vathana
- House: Sisowath (by birth); Norodom (by marriage)
- Father: Sisowath Monivong
- Mother: Norodom Kanviman Norleak Tevi
- Religion: Theravada Buddhism

Modern kings of Cambodia
- Ang Duong
- Norodom
- Sisowath
- Sisowath Monivong
- Norodom Sihanouk (first reign)
- Norodom Suramarit
- Sisowath Kossamak (ceremonial queen)
- Norodom Sihanouk (second reign)
- Norodom Sihamoni

Sisowath Kossamak (Khmer: ស៊ីសុវត្ថិ កុសុមៈ, Sisŏvăt Kŏsămă; 9 April 1904 – 27 April 1975) was Queen of Cambodia from 1955 to 1960 as the wife of King Norodom Suramarit and reigning Queen of Cambodia from 1960 until the abolition of the monarchy in 1970. After her husband's death in 1960, her son Norodom Sihanouk became chief of state, with Queen Kossamak performing as the ceremonial monarch. Sisowath Kossamak was born a Cambodian princess as the daughter of King Sisowath Monivong and his wife Norodom Kanviman Norleak Tevi. Her official title was Preah Mohaksatreiyani Sisowath Monivong Kossamak Nearirath Serey Vathana (Khmer: ព្រះមហាក្សត្រិយានី ស៊ីសុវត្ថិ មុនីវង្ស កុសុមៈ នារីរ័ត្ន សេរីវឌ្ឍនា, Preah Môhaksătrĕyani Sisŏvăt Mŭnivǒng Kŏsămă Niariroăt Serei Voătheăna).

Upon the death of Monivong in 1941, Sihanouk took the throne. In 1955, he abdicated in favor of his father Suramarit, who then reigned for five years. After her husband's death, Kossamak kept her title of Queen and continued to function as the symbol and representative of the monarchy while Sihanouk assumed his position as head of state, but titled as Prince rather than King. After the coup in March 1970, Kossamak was placed under arrest, but retained her title before being stripped of all status during the formal proclamation of the republic in October of the same year. She remained under house arrest until her health declined in 1973, and she was allowed to join her son in China. On 21 April 1975, Prince Sirik Matak was executed by firing squad at the Cercle Sportif in Phnom Penh, shortly after refusing evacuation and being captured by the orders of Angkar ("The Organization"). Kossamak died in Beijing on 27 April 1975, ten days after the Khmer Rouge captured Phnom Penh, when "Angkar" came to power as the beginning of Year Zero, to build a new agrarian, socialist society of Democratic Kampuchea (DK), which was constituted on 5 January 1976.

== Biography ==
=== Early life ===
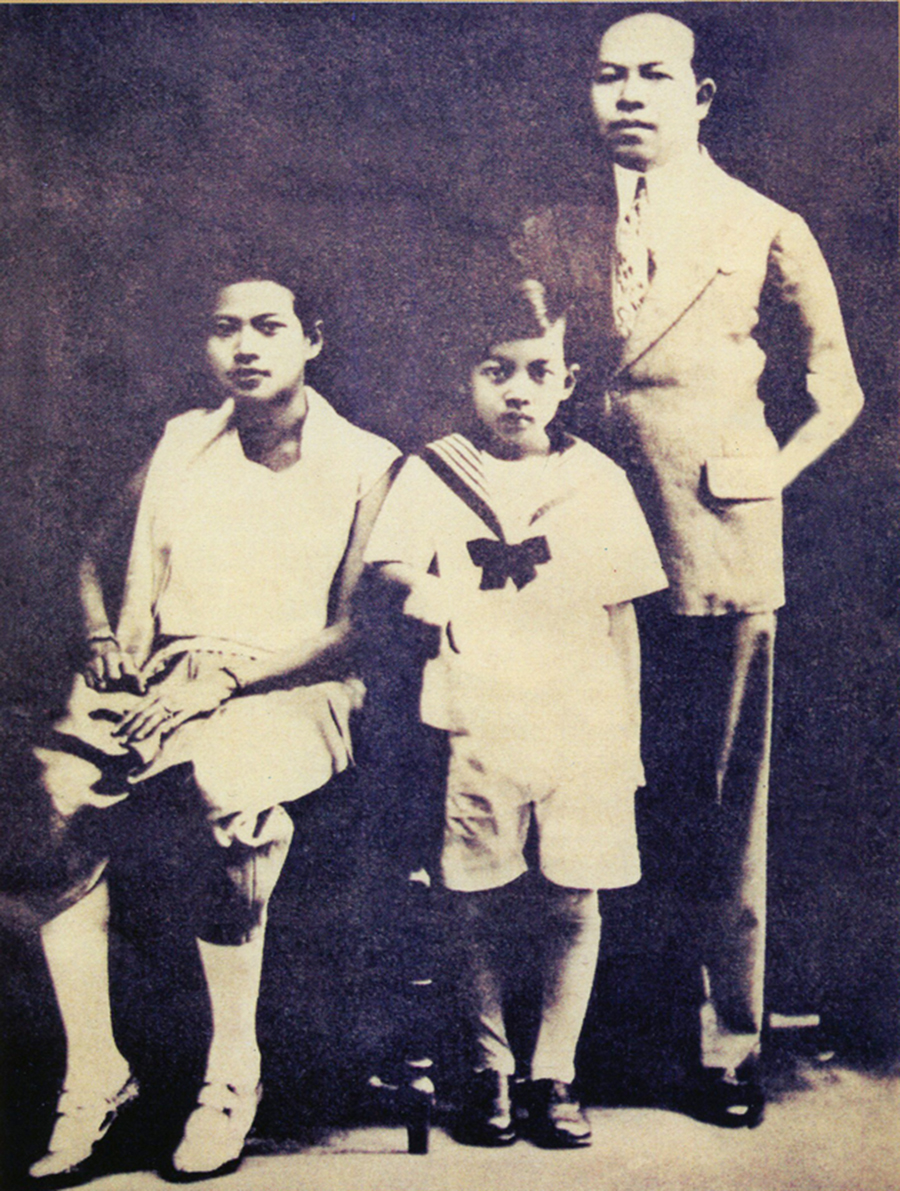
Family portrait of a young Norodom Sihanouk, Sisowath Kossamak, and Norodom Suramarit.

Sisowath Kosamak was the daughter of King Sisowath Monivong and Queen Norodom Kanviman Norleak Tevi.

She married her father's cousin prince Norodom Suramarit in 1920.

Upon the death of her father Monivong in 1941, Sihanouk, her son and Monivong's grandson, was selected as the new king.

In the 1940s, Kossamak famously choreographed the apsara dance by training her first grand daughter, Princess Norodom Bopha Devi, to become the first Apsara dancer.

=== 1955–1960 ===
In 1955, Sihanouk abdicated in favour of his father, making Kossamak queen consort. In 1955, Sihanouk married Princess Monique, with whom Kossamak was not on good terms, leading to advisories blaming Monique for the sometimes strained relationship between Kossamak and Sihanouk and for Sihanouk's alleged initial hesitance to abdicate, as it would make his mother queen. Like her daughter-in-law, Kossamak was accused of promoting proteges to civil offices.

Queen Kossamak enjoyed great respect and popularity: despite being neither a monarch nor politically influential, she was said to exert great moral authority over the Khmers, was described as generous to the poor and devoting herself to the welfare of the nation. As queen, she received foreign guests and hosted state functions, where the Royal Ballet of Cambodia often performed. A notable state visit was that of Chen Yi in November 1958, who led a women's delegation from the People's Republic of China.

=== 1960–1970 ===
Her son Prince Sihanouk had sworn in 1955 that he would never again ascend the throne, and he had also forbidden his own children from assuming sovereignty during his lifetime. When king Norodom Suramarit died in 1960, a demonstration took place in Battambang in which the protestors called for the widowed Queen Kossamak to take the throne as a ruling monarch.

However, Article 25 of the Constitution prohibited her succeeding to the throne because of the stipulation that ‘the Throne of Cambodia is the heritage of the male descendants of King Ang Duong’. Her brother Prince Monireth was in favour of changing the Constitution, to allow his sister to be instated as sovereign in her own right. Considering the monarchy in a dubious situation, when Sihanouk was not willing to ascend the throne again nor to allow his children to do so, the Council of Regency did propose to him that the constitution be changed so that his mother could succeed to the throne. However, Prince Sihanouk refused to agree to the suggestion because of his uneasy relationship with his mother and his unwillingness to allow anyone but himself as head of state. He commented his refusal with the comment that ‘Only God understands the reasons why I do not want my mother to ascend the throne.’ Among the Khmer Republic literati, Sihanouk's refusal to allow his mother to succeed in 1960 was blamed his being ‘blinded by his passion for his wife Monique’, who was known for not getting along with her mother-in-law.

Instead, Norodom Sihanouk himself again succeed his father as head of state, although he did abstain from regaining the title of king. Once again head of state from 20 June 1960, he reorganised the royal palace and royal court were his mother lived. Her brother Prince Monireth commented the matter in his memoirs that it was a shame that his sister had not been born male so she could have succeeded to the throne:

‘What a King we would have in Her! Certainly with Her, a great many disagreements, and a great deal of foolishness could have been avoided’.

Sisowath Kossamak kept her title of Queen after the death of her spouse, which was a higher title than her son, the head of state, who insisted on keeping his title Prince rather than King. Queen Kossamak occupied the throne of Cambodia from 1960 but her political power was virtually non-existent.

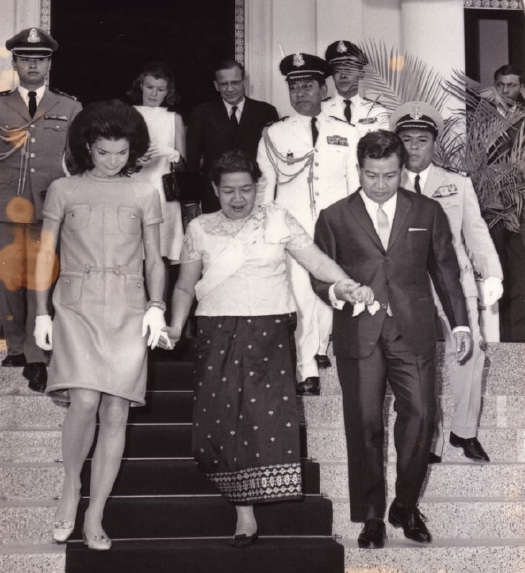
The Queen Mother with Prince Sihanouk and former US First Lady Jacqueline Kennedy in 1967.

Queen Kossamak continued in her public representational role during the reign of her son as Chief of State during the 1960s. She also upheld her great popularity. Her prestigious public role was described in the New Cambodge 5 (September 1970):

"Today, Her Majesty Queen Kossamak who neither reigns nor governs, exercises considerable moral authority over all Khmers and sits well in the line of past queens, compassionate towards the poor and busies herself in fulfilling her duties with regard to the Nation and the people".

The growing opposition against the Sihanouk regime, however, did influence the perception of the queen mother as well. It has been suggested that Queen Kossamak did exercise the prerogative in influencing appointments to civil service positions and investment in non-transparent enterprises, which were normal for the Cambodian elite at the time. In 1968, there was slander among the opposition against both her and her daughter-in-law Princess Monique for greed, for enriching themselves and for managing a brothel.

=== Later life ===
After the Cambodian coup of 1970, Kossamak was forced to leave the royal palace by the new government and held in house arrest in one wing of Khemarin Palace to prevent her from becoming involved in any potential royalist uprising. She was however asked by the Khmer Republic government to mediate between her son and the National Assembly ‘in a last-ditch attempt to turn the people’s anger and save her son’. Pictures of Queen Kossamak, a non-ruling monarch but a symbol of royal permanence, were stripped from government buildings.

She was allowed to join her son in Beijing in China for health reasons in 1973.

She died in Beijing in China on 27 April 1975, shortly before her son and daughter-in-law returned to Cambodia under the rule of Angkar, the new Marxist–Leninist organization after it came to power on 17 April and the beginning of Year Zero, following the Fall of Phnom Penh by the Khmer Rouge.

In September 1975, Prince Sihanouk returned to Phnom Penh and carried out funeral ceremonies in the Silver Pagoda for his mother Queen Kossamak.

== Honours ==
=== Foreign honours ===
- Czechoslovakia:
  - First Class of the Order of the White Lion (1963)
- Indonesia:
  - Adipurna First Class Star of the Republic of Indonesia (1968)
- (Ethiopian Empire) Ethiopia:
  - Knight of the Order of Solomon (1968)
- France:
  - Grand Cross of the Legion of Honour
- (Kingdom of Laos) Laos:
  - Grand Cross of the Order of the Million Elephants and the White Parasol (1963)
- Malaysia:
  - Honorary Recipient of the Most Exalted Order of the Crown of the Realm (1964)
- Singapore:
  - First Class of the Order of Temasek (1963)
- Yugoslavia:
  - Grand Star of the Order of the Yugoslav Star (1964)

== Sources ==
- "Cambodian Apsara Dance". Web of Cambodia. 22 April 2023.
- "Cambodia Heads of State". Worldwide Guide to Women in Leadership. 2009-07-12.

Sisowath Kossamak House of Sisowath Born: 9 April 1904 Died: 27 April 1975
Royal titles
| Preceded by Norodom Monineath | Queen consort of Cambodia; 3 March 1955 – 3 April 1960 | Succeeded by Norodom Monineath |
Regnal titles
| Preceded by Norodom Suramarit | — DISPUTED — Queen of Cambodia; 20 June 1960 – 9 October 1970 | Succeeded by Norodom Sihanouk |
