= Samdech Euv (disambiguation) =

Samdech Euv (Khmer: សម្តេចឪ, romanized: Sâmdéch Âu, /sɑmˈɗac ʔɨw/, lit. 'King Father'), is a title frequently used to refer to Norodom Sihanouk (1922–2012), retired king of Cambodia

Samdech Euv may also refer to:

- Samdech Euv Autonomous Zone (1993), a former separatist region of Kampuchea
- Samdech Euv High School, any of several schools in Cambodia
- Samdech Euv Team, a charity group founded by King Sihanouk.

== See also ==
- Euv (disambiguation)
- Samdech
- Queen-mother (disambiguation)
