= Norodom Duong Chakr =

Norodom Duong Chakr នរោត្តម ឌួងចក្រ
- Prince of Cambodia
- Born: 1861; Royal Palace, Oudong, Cambodia
- Died: March 25, 1897 (aged 35–36); Djelfa, French Algeria
- Spouse: Miss Anak Rondeng; Miss Anak An; Miss Anak Ouk
- Issue: Norodom Mon Thun (Norodom Riththa Rainsy); Norodom Preah Peay Phat; Norodom Vilay Leak
- House: House of Norodom
- Father: Norodom of Cambodia
- Mother: Cham Socheat Bopha Nuon (Khun Than)

Norodom Duong Chakr (Khmer: នរោត្តម ឌួងចក្រ) was a Cambodian prince of the late nineteenth century, the fifth son of King Norodom of Cambodia who was deported to French Algeria where he died in exile in 1897.

== Biography ==
=== Royal education ===
Prince Norodom Duong Chakr was the fifth son of King Norodom which he had with Cham Socheat Bopha Nuon, also known as Princess Khun Than, who had been a favorite of King Ang Duong beforehand. He was born in the former Oudong Royal Palace in 1861 and was wise and well-educated both on national and international affairs. He spoke fluent Khmer, Thai and French.

=== Prince in the anti-French rebellion ===
At first, Duong Chakr was a favorite of his father, who considered him, according to contemporary sources as a "smart and sassy fellow". However, opposing the French presence in Cambodia, Duong Chark became a staunch supporter of Si Votha's rebellion against France in 1885–1886, arousing support even from Vietnamese minorities, before later being suppressed by the French.

Having helped peace to return after the rebellion, Duong Chark received the Legion of Honour (Officer's grade) in 1887 from the French authorities as a sign of their gratitude and the clemency of Gouverneur Général Georges Jules Piquet. Princess Khun Than tried to discredit Prince Norodom Yukanthor so that the throne would be handed to her own son Prince Norodom Duong Chakr, but her candidate was opposed by the French because of his anti-French tendencies, on the pretext that he had joined the rebel movement.

A few years after however, the new Résident Supérieur, Albert Louis Huyn de Vernéville, went after the Prince and his mother which he considered enemies of the Protectorate, being considered capable, intelligent and ambitious and a threat to the colonial administration. The French authorities arrested him and imprisoned him on April 30, 1890, for only a month to Saigon. Twice he tried to commit regicide against his own father before feeling to Bangkok where he arrived on August 25, 1891.

=== Deportation and death in French Algeria ===
While under surveillance of the French embassy in Bangkok, Duong Chakr came into relationship with French diplomat Auguste Pavie who suggested that he return to Cambodia to avoid meddling with the escalating conflict between Siam and France, which both the Khmer authorities and the French Protectorate refused. As his residence of the Siamese court in Bangkok became more and more uneasy as the result of the Franco-Siamese conflict, Duong Chakr planned to travel to France, selling his last jewels to pay for the costs of travels with his concubine. On 16 June 1893, Duong Chakr disembarked from the Natal cruiseship into the port of Marseille after a stop in Singapore.

Unsatisfied with the French protectorate and the contempt of the Khmer royal family, especially coming from the Résident Supérieur, Albert Louis Huyn de Vernéville, Duong Chakr was travelling to protest his extradition from Cambodia. He criticized the pressure on the Khmer royal family and the collection of taxes oppressing the Khmer people by the French administration and asked for a new governor-general to replace de Vernéville. With the help of his connections with his former French teacher Emile Pelletier, a French explorer to Cambodia, and Charles Le Myre de Vilers, Duong Chark was able to come in contact with Théophile Delcassé, who granted him a meeting on June 26, 1893. Duong Chark was then caught in a mediatic storm between pro- and anti- French supporters, such as Le Figaro and Libre Parole and one side and La Politique coloniale on the other, the ones criticizing the government for despising a French ally, the others denouncing the short memory of those who forget the Prince was behind the 1885 anti-colonial rebellion.

Meanwhile, governor-general of French Indochina Jean Marie Antoine de Lanessan reported that the King of Cambodia who had repudiated his son was not favorable to such a warm welcome in France. On August 26, the Prince was taken into custody by the French police and forcefully put on the train back to Marseille. On August 28, 1893, the Khmer prince embarked on the Duc de Bragance cruiseship headed to Alger in Algeria, then a French colony in Africa, where he arrived on August 29. He was driven to Djelfa on the northeast edge of the Sahara and with the dry, steppe-like Hautes Plaines to the North, "in one of the worst possible exilic locales" where it was impossible to "escape the hopeless monotony". He was placed under house arrest with limited permission to navigate within the city .

In exile, the couple gave birth to a child whom they desired to raise in the Catholic faith and named after the French President, Princess Norodom Mon Thun. The Khmer prince was imprisoned until his death on March 25, 1897, at the age of 36 of the combined effects of "climate, boredom and alcoholism".

After his death, his wife and son, as well as his own corpse in a coffin were sent back to Cambodia on the Chandernagor steamship, leaving Marseille on August 1, 1896.

Seven years after him, his brother Prince Yukanthor, who had become the new favourite for succession to the Khmer throne, would suffer an equivalent humiliation and dismissal from the French Republic.

== Posterity ==
=== A royal descendance ===
Prince Duong Chakr had three concubines: Miss Anak Romdeng (daughter of court poet Santhor Mok), Miss Anak An and Miss Anak Ouk. He also had two sons and two daughters: Princess Norodom Mon Thun (also known as Prince Norodom Riththa Rainsy) and Princess Norodom Preah Peay Phat, and Princess Norodom Vilay Leak. Princess Norodom Preah Peay Phat and Princess Norodom Vilay Leak. One of his grandsons, Norodom Balay (born 1931), was a Cambodian Air Force pilot in the 1970s.

His third concubine, Miss Ouk, would remarry after his death and was the mother of Mrs. Pomme Peang and was the grandmother of Miss Paule-Monique Izzi, the current Queen Mother of Cambodia, known as Norodom Monineath Sihanouk.

=== A painful memory for French and Khmer history ===
While it is still to be proven what part of responsibility the French Republic and the Khmer monarchy had in the exile of Prince Duong Chakr, it remains that three of Norodom's sons, Mayura, Yukanthor and Duong Chakr had their lives blighted because of their opposition to Sisowath and the French. King Norodom was heartbroken by what had happened to Yukanthor and Duong Chakr, and despite the silence of the Royal Chronicles of Cambodia on the matter, uterine rivalry within the Khmer monarchy is an enduring source of grief for the Khmer nation.

== Bibliography ==
- Lamant, Pierre (1980). "L'affaire Duong Chakr". Outre-Mers. Revue d'histoire. 67 (246): 123–150. doi:10.3406/outre.1980.2240.
