= Order of the Million Elephants and the White Parasol =

Highest knighthood order of the Kingdom of Laos

Order of the Million Elephants and the White Parasol ອິສະຣິຍາພອນລ້ານຊ້າງຮົ່ມຂາວ
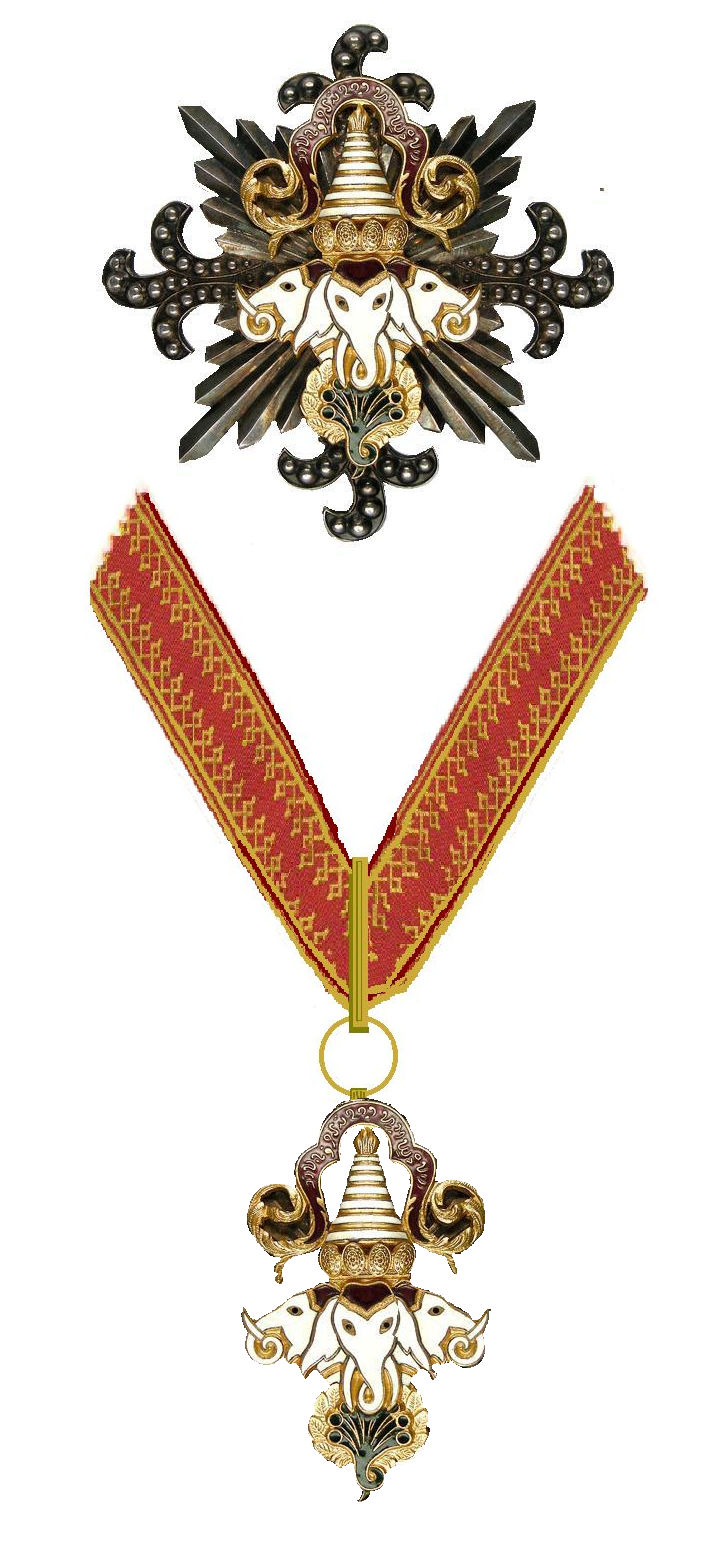

Awarded by the King of Laos
- Status: Extinct as the Kingdom, now Dynastic award
- Sovereign: Sisavang Vong; Savang Vatthana
- Grades: Grand Cross with Collar; Grand Cross; Grand Officer; Commander; Officer; Knight

Precedence
- Next (higher): None; highest.
- Next (lower): Order of the Crown
- Ribbon of the Order

The Order of the Million Elephants and the White Parasol, also called the Order of the Million Elephants and the White Umbrella (Lao: ອິສະຣິຍາພອນລ້ານຊ້າງຮົ່ມຂາວ Itsariyaphon Lan Sang Hom Khao), is the highest knighthood order of the Royal Family of Laos.

== History ==
The Order was founded on 1 May 1909 by King Sisavang Vong.

The name of the order reflected an old name of Laos, Lan Xang Hom Khao which means "million elephants and white umbrella".

The Royal system of Orders and Medals effectively ended with the fall of Laos in 1975. The Royal Orders, by their nature, remain the dynastic property of the Royal House of Laos in absentia, and are still awarded by the Royal House as a dynastic award. The honour is still awarded in recognition of dedicated services to charity and humanitarianism. All grades of the Order are approved for wear as a foreign order (i.e. after all British and other Commonwealth decorations) by Elizabeth II, Queen of the United Kingdom and the other Commonwealth realms, as it is on the "Schedule of Approved Countries and Awards".

== Classes ==
The Order consisted of the following classes, in descending order:

- Grand Cross with Collar
- Grand Cross (ປະຖະມາພອນ Pathamaphon)
- Grand Officer (ທຸຕິຍາພອນ Thutiyaphon)
- Commander (ຕະຕິຍາພອນ Tatiyaphon)
- Officer (ຈະຕູດຖາພອນ Jatutthaphon)
- Knight (ປັນຈະມາພອນ Panchamaphon)

Ribbon bars
| Grand Cross with Collar | Grand Cross | Grand Officer |
| Commander | Officer | Knight |

== Insignia ==
The ribbon on which the Order is worn is red, ornamented with a yellow geometrical design.

== Notable recipients ==
- Crown of Nepal
  - Mahendra, King of Nepal (1955–1972) (1970)
  - Ratna, Queen consort of Nepal (1960–1972) (1970)
  - Birendra, King of Nepal (1972–2001) when Crown Prince (1970)
  - Aishwarya, Queen consort of Nepal (1972–2001) when Crown Princess (1970)
- Crown of Thailand
  - Bhumibol Adulyadej, King of Thailand (1963)
  - Sirikit, Queen consort of Thailand (1963)
  - Plaek Phibunsongkhram, Prime Minister of Thailand
  - Sarit Thanarat, Prime Minister of Thailand
  - Thanom Kittikachorn, Prime Minister of Thailand
- Crown of Cambodia
  - Sisowath Monivong, King of Cambodia (1927–1941)
  - Norodom Suramarit, King of Cambodia (1955–1960) (1955)
  - Norodom Sihanouk, King of Cambodia (1941–1955) / (1993–2004)
- Crown of Vietnam
  - Bảo Đại, Emperor of Vietnam (1926–1945)
  - Bảo Long, Crown Prince of Vietnam (1939–2007)
- French Republic
  - Charles de Gaulle
  - Marcelle Lafont
  - Jean de Lattre de Tassigny
  - Philippe Leclerc de Hauteclocque
  - Adrien Conus
  - René Joyeuse
  - René Gaurand
  - Roger Faulques
  - Louis Renault
- Others
  - Hamengkubuwano VIII
  - James Greenway
  - Eisaku Sato
  - BG. Dean Murphy USV-JSC
  - BG. Robert C. Quesada USV-JSC
