= Sisowath of Cambodia =

King of Cambodia from 1904 to 1927

Sisowath
- Preah Riachianukot
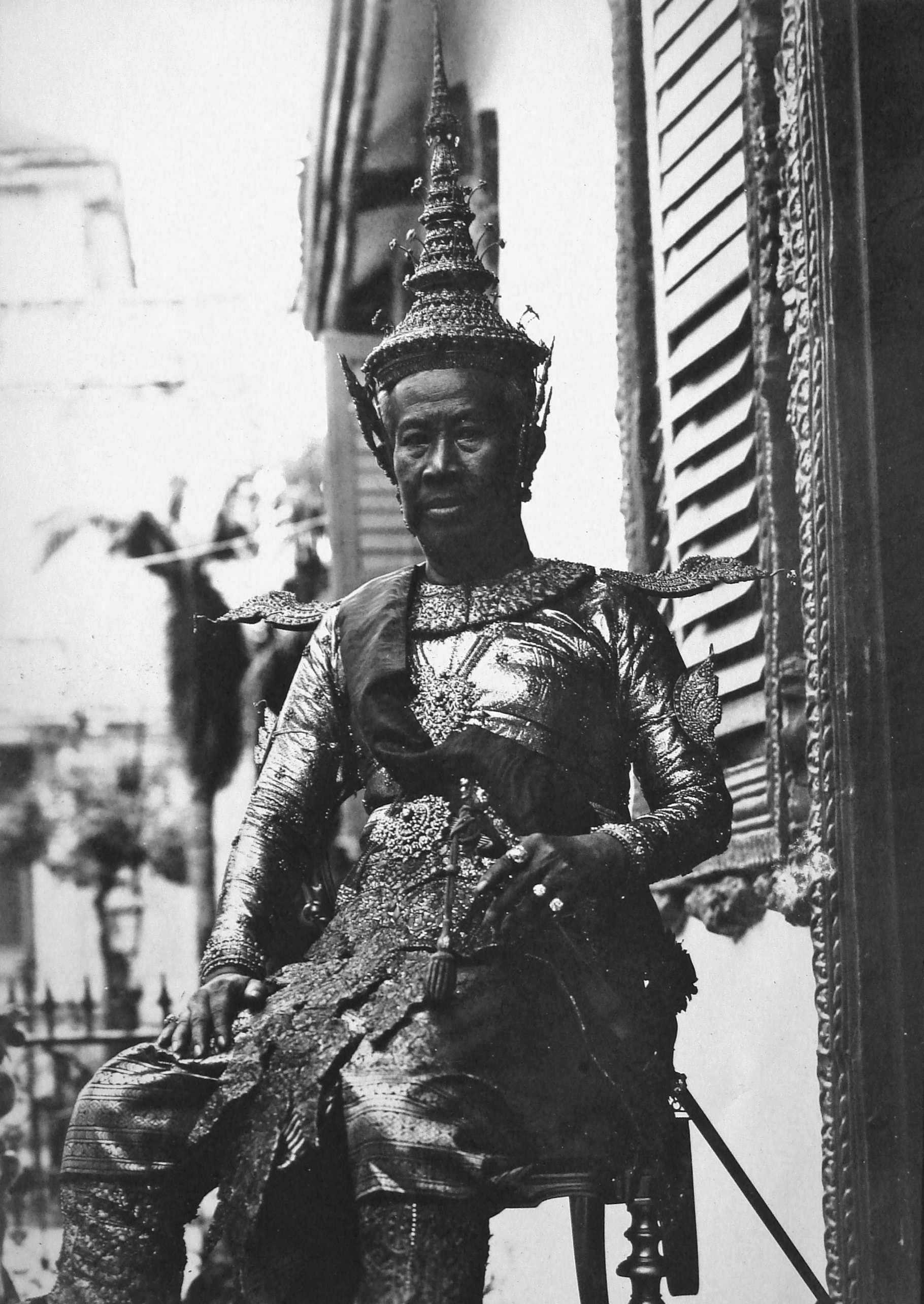
- Sisowath in his regalia in 1922

King of Cambodia
- Reign: 27 April 1904 – 9 August 1927
- Coronation: 28 April 1906
- Predecessor: Norodom
- Successor: Sisowath Monivong
- Born: Ang Sar; 7 September 1840; Mongkonburi, Phra Tabong Province, Cambodia, Siam (present-day Banteay Meanchey, Cambodia)
- Died: 9 August 1927 (aged 86); Khemarin Palace, Phnom Penh, Cambodia, French Indochina
- Burial: Oudong Mountain, Cambodia
- Spouse: 20 consorts and concubines
- Issue: 16 sons and 13 daughters, including: Sisowath Monivong
Names
- Preah Bat Samdach Preah Sisowath Chamchakrapong Haririach Baramin Phoeunai Kraikaewfa Solalai Preah Chau Krong Kampuchia Thipadoei
Posthumous name
- Preah Karona Preah Sisowath Preah Riachianukot
- House: Sisowath
- Father: Ang Duong
- Mother: Neang Pou
- Religion: Buddhism

Modern kings of Cambodia
- Ang Duong
- Norodom
- Sisowath
- Sisowath Monivong
- Norodom Sihanouk (first reign)
- Norodom Suramarit
- Sisowath Kossamak (ceremonial queen)
- Norodom Sihanouk (second reign)
- Norodom Sihamoni

Sisowath (Khmer: ស៊ីសុវត្ថិ, Sisŏvăt) (7 September 1840 – 9 August 1927) was King of Cambodia from 27 April 1904 to his death in 1927. During his rule, there was extensive French meddling in Cambodian politics, as Cambodia was part of French Indochina. He was the son of King Ang Duong and half brother of Prince Si Votha and King Norodom. He is the progenitor of the House of Sisowath.

== Life ==
Sisowath was given the birth name of "Ang Sa" (អង្គសោ). When he was born, Cambodia was under joint Siamese and Vietnamese rule. The royal family lived in Battambang then under Siamese hegemony. Like his brother King Norodom, Sisowath was educated in the Siamese capital of Bangkok. He did not return to his native Cambodia until 1860, when his father and the ruling monarch, Ang Duong, died.

He hastily returned to Oudong, the royal capital of Cambodia, to prevent his half-brother, Prince Si Votha from seizing the throne. He succeeded, and his other half-brother, Norodom, became king. Although Norodom was more compliant, rebellion broke out in Cambodia, and soon the French, seeking control of Southeast Asia, forced Norodom to comply with a French protectorate over Cambodia. The French thus drove out the Thai and the Vietnamese officials, and Cambodia became a French protectorate. However, Norodom never truly complied with the French, and signed a secret treaty with siam, still acknowledging their suzerainty over Cambodia, and allowed them to keep Battambang and siem reap, which the Thais conquered in 1795.

Sisowath was enraged, and he exiled himself to Saigon in Vietnam in 1864, the other former overlord of Cambodia, in a show of defiance. The French, who also had control of Saigon, persuaded Sisowath to remain there under French "protection", as his life was in danger by the "rebels in Cambodia". In reality, the French used Sisowath as a tool to threaten Norodom. If Norodom was not following France's policies of reform, they could threaten Norodom with Sisowath and say that they would depose Norodom and replace him with Sisowath if he did not comply.

In 1867, after news of the treaty with siam broke out to the public, Cambodia was in open rebellion against French rule, King Norodom pleaded Sisowath to return to Cambodia to quell the uprising. Sisowath returned from Vietnam to Oudong and helped quell the uprising, restoring peace and order, and punishing the rebels, and with cooperation with the french, he forced siam to sign another treaty with the cambodian proctaterate, canceling out their secret treaty with norodom and forcing siam to finally give up control over cambodia (though, they still kept battambang and siem reap, which sisowath would eventually get back, along with other major provinces from siam, during his reign in 1907) this greatly boosted his popularity amongst the people and in 1884, when the French took full control over Vietnam, Laos, and Cambodia, and also defeated Siam in a war in 1893, Cambodia became an open French colony, (With decent autonomy) and the capital was moved from Oudong to Phnom Penh. Moving the royal court to Phnom Penh, Sisowath gave his full support to the French colonial regime. Norodom thus was compelled to name Sisowath his future successor.

== Reign ==
In 1904, when Norodom died, Sisowath was crowned as king of Cambodia, a crown that would have gone to one of Norodom's sons, Prince Yukanthor, were it not for the latter having a falling-out with the French. During his reign, Sisowath continued Norodom's role in government, where he was well rewarded by the French for his cooperation: they built him a new palace, gave him a steam-powered yacht, and supplied him with a complementary ration of 250 lbs of high-grade opium per year. In 1927, he died in Phnom Penh and was given the posthumous title of Preah Karona Preah Sisowath Preah Riachianukot (Khmer: ព្រះករុណា ព្រះស៊ីសុវត្ថិ ព្រះរាជានុកូត). He was succeeded by his son and crown prince, Prince Sisowath Monivong. At the time of his death, he was the world's oldest monarch.

Under his reign, Sisowath, with French pressured the Siamese to return to the Khmers the provinces of Siem Reap (Along with the temples of Angkor Wat and Bayon), Battambang and Banteay Meanchey in 1907. These provinces were under Siamese control since 1795 until then. It was considered to be the greatest achievement of his reign, and is said to have reawakened Khmer pride and remembrance of their great past.

Not only that, Sisowath also was a patron of Khmer culture, promoting his classical dance troupes all over Europe to promote Cambodian culture in Europe.

Sisowath also helped modernise Cambodia, cooperating with French officials to build railways from Phnom Penh to Battambang, overseeing the construction of a modern throne hall in the royal palace, replacing the previous wooden structures in 1919, as well as building schools such as Preah Sisowath highschool, many wats and pagodas, an advanced pali-sanskrit institution, and the creation of the National Museum of Cambodia to store and preserve priceless treasures from the Khmer's great Angkorian past.

He is often regarded as one of Cambodia's most revered kings, able to maneuver through the political climate, restoring national integrity, and reclaiming the great temples of Angkor, from Siam but also modernising the once feudal Khmer kingdom.

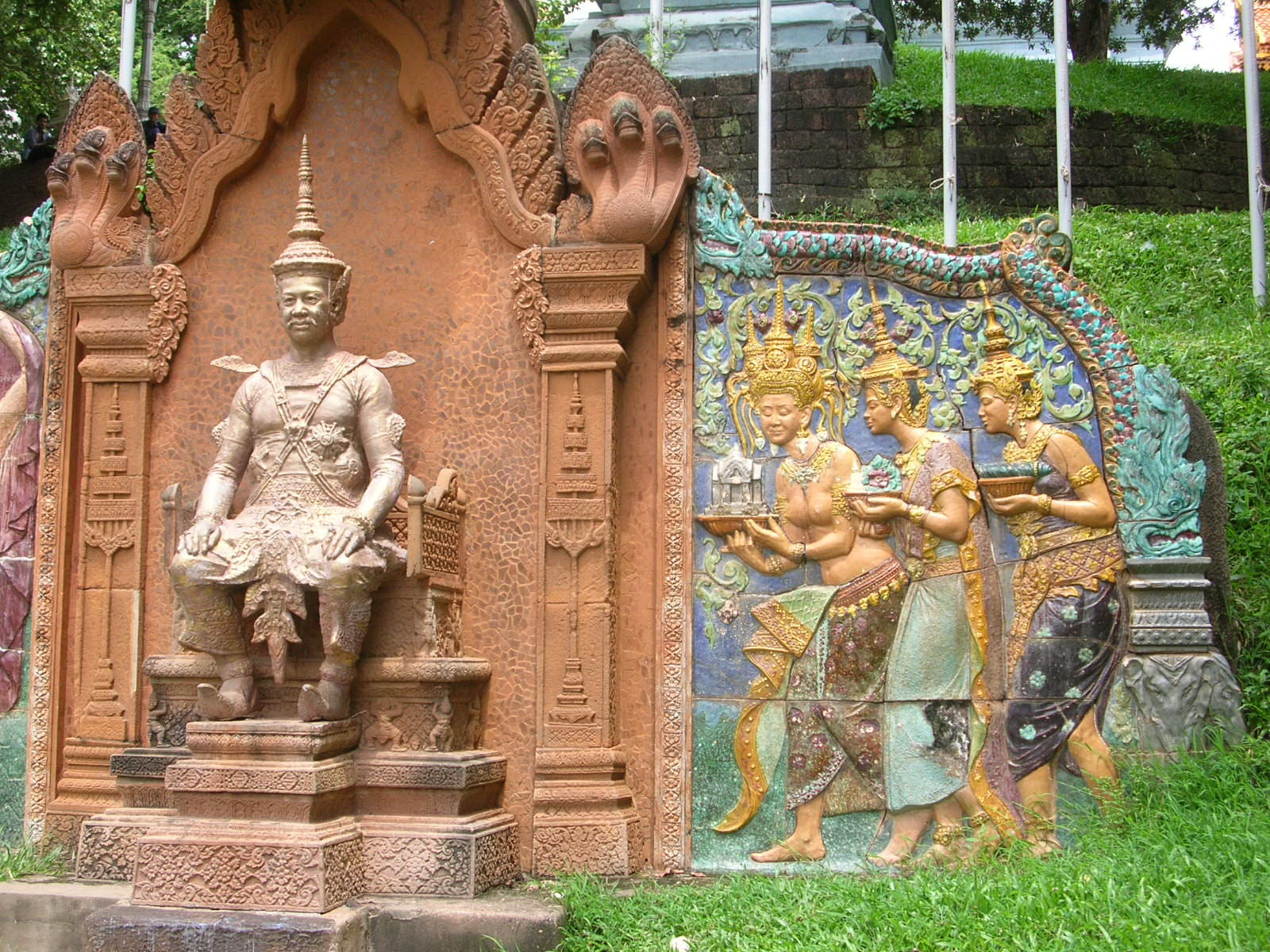
Monument commemorating the restoration of the three provinces of Banteay Meanchey, Battambang and Siem Reap in 1907. These three territories were seized by Siam in the late 18th century but returned under French pressure, by the Franco-Siamese Treaty of 23 March 1907.

== Crowning ==
On April 24, 1904, the day King Norodom died, the Royal Crown Council met, gathering senior ministers and personalities of the kingdom, in order to elect the new sovereign. The Crown Council elected Samdach Oppareach Preah Sisowath (the Viceroy) as successor to his elder step-brother. He was crowned as Preah Bat Samdach Preah Sisowath Chamchakrapong Haririach Baramin Phoeunai Kraikaewfa Solalai Preah Chau Krong Kampuchia Thipadoei (Khmer: ព្រះបាទសម្តេចព្រះស៊ីសុវត្ថិ ចមចក្រពង្ស ហរិរាជបរមិន្ធ្រភូវណៃ ក្រៃកែវហ្វាសុឡាឡៃ ព្រះចៅក្រុងកម្ពុជាធិបតី).

== Honours ==
- Sweden: Commander Grand Cross of the Order of Vasa, 1912

== Gallery ==
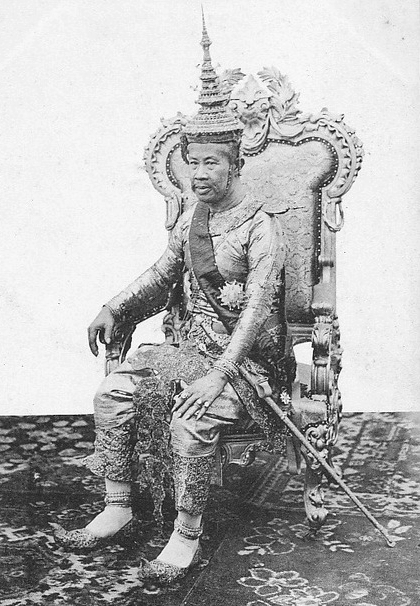

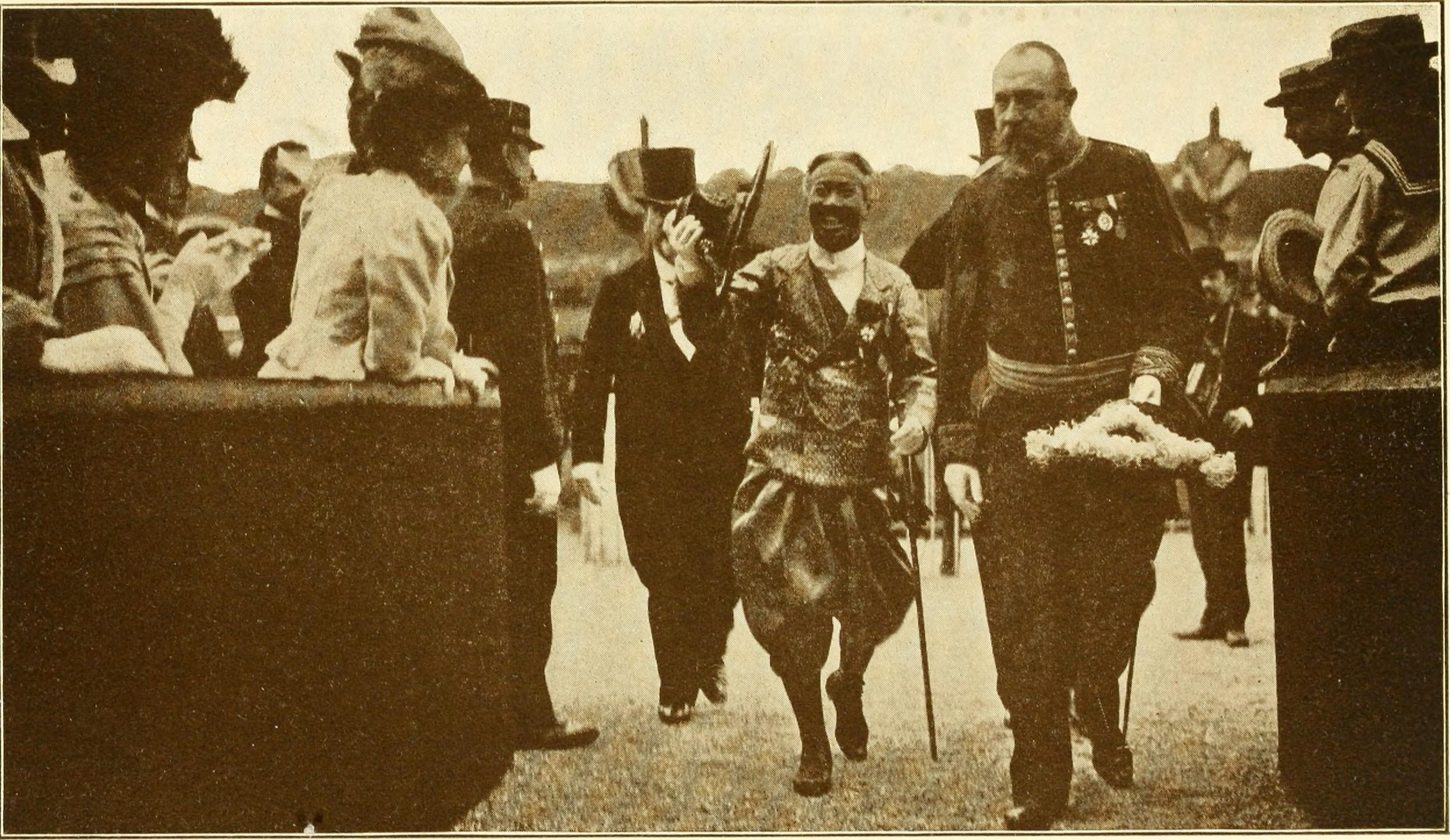
King Sisowath greeting French officials in 1911.

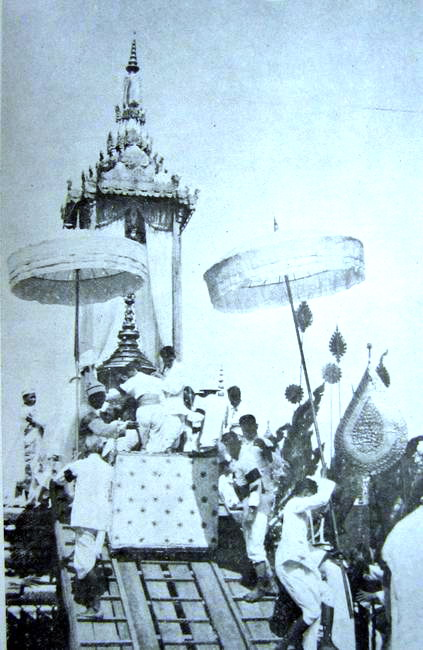
Transporting King Sisowath's Funerary Urn upon the Great Victory Chariot, 1928

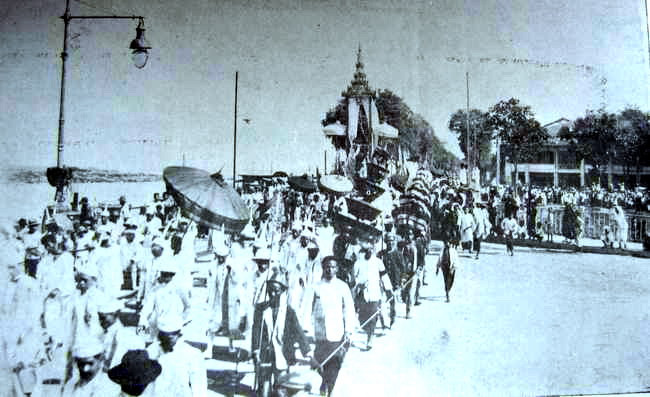
The procession of His Majesty King Sisowath's Funerary Urn

== Bibliography ==
- Jeldres, Julio A (2003). The Royal House of Cambodia. Phnom Penh Cambodia: Monument Books. OCLC 54003889.

Sisowath of Cambodia House of Sisowath Born: 7 September 1840 Died: 9 August 1927
Regnal titles
Preceded by Norodom	King of Cambodia; 1904–1927	Succeeded by Sisowath Monivong
