= Norodom Naradipo =

Cambodian prince (1946-c.1976)

Norodom Naradipo នរោត្តម នរៈទីប៉ោ
- Born: 10 February 1946; Phnom Penh, Cambodia, French Indochina
- House: House of Norodom
- Father: Norodom Sihanouk
- Mother: Sisowath Monikessan
- Disappeared: 1976? (aged 30); Kampuchea

Prince Norodom Naradipo (also spelled Noreakthipo; Khmer: នរោត្តម នរៈទីប៉ោ, Chinese: 诺罗敦·纳拉迪波, 10 February 1946 – c. 1976) was a Cambodian prince who went from being known as the "Prince of the People" during his life to posthumously being referred to as "the most unfortunate prince".

== Biography ==
=== Early life and education ===
Samdech Norodom Sihanouk Naradipo was born to King Norodom Sihanouk and Princess Sisowath Monikessan on 10 February 1946. Naradipo's mother died of post-natal complications shortly after his birth. He was brought up by Princess Sisowath Pongsanmoni. He was educated in Phnom Penh and later in Beijing.

Naradipo was sent to a school in Beijing, China together with his two half-brothers Yuvaneath and Khemanourak under the personal supervision of Chinese Premier Zhou Enlai in 1960. Naradipo entered Dengshikou Middle School (灯市口中学, now merged into Beijing No. 25 Middle School) in 1962. Later, he attended senior high school (gao zhong) in Affiliated High School of Peking University. Naradipo was designated as Sihanouk's heir on 17 November 1963, to be his successor as the leader of the Sangkum and, eventually, as Chief of State: according to King Norodom who was starting to feel insecure about his own personal safety, Naradipo was chosen as "he alone would be capable of maintaining [...] the absolute unity which is indispensable" for Cambodia. After graduation in 1965, he studied Chinese language and literature in Peking University, In the next year, the Culture Revolution broke out. Guo Luoji, a teacher of Peking University, described that the prince shared Maoist views, which was unacceptable for Cambodian royalty. In 1967, Naradipo had to leave China without a degree.

=== Exile in France ===
Naradipo headed for France to accomplish his study, however, May 1968 events in France caused him to have to return to Cambodia.

=== Return to Cambodia ===
Upon his return to Cambodia, Naradipo, with his fluency in Chinese, became the editor of the government's Chinese newspaper. As a Communist, Naradipo acquired a nickname: the People's Prince. Sihanouk was ousted as head of state in 1970. Naradipo was arrested and sentenced to five years imprisonment for alleged involvement in terrorist attacks, by a special military tribunal of Lon Nol regime on 17 July 1971. Naradipo was released on 1 May 1973. In the following year, he left for exile in China.

=== Disappearance and death in absentia ===
Naradipo returned to Cambodia with his father in late 1975. He disappeared mysteriously in 1976. During the Khmer Rouge years, five of Sihanouk's children disappeared, including Prince Norodom Naradipo, Princess Norodom Sorya Roeungsi, Prince Norodom Khemanourak, Princess Norodom Botum Bopha and Princess Norodom Sujata.

Sihanouk wrote several letters to the Khmer Rouge leadership asking them to allow his children to come and visit him, but he never received an answer. All of them were declared dead in absentia. On 7 June 1994, Naradipo was posthumously granted the Cambodian royal title of Samdech. However, there were rumors that he was still alive.

Several people claimed to be the missing prince, all of whom were confirmed impostors. On 12 February 2010, Sihanouk reasserted that Naradipo and Khemanourak were killed by the Khmer Rouge.

== Legacy ==
Decades after his disappearance, Prince Naradipo is still at the heart of a faithful devotion, some Khmers believing that he could have been the prophesied Prince who would have saved the Khmer nation. Other devotees even claim have to have identified his reincarnation, namely abbot Lim Buntheoun in the United States of America, despite the fact that the latter has publicly refused this claim.

== See also ==
- List of people who disappeared mysteriously: post-1970
