= Si Votha =

Cambodian prince (d. 1891)

- Born: 1841; Cambodia
- Died: 31 December 1891; Cambodia, French Indochina
- Father: Ang Duong
- Religion: Theravada Buddhism

Si Votha (Khmer: ស៊ីវត្ថា; also spelled Si Vattha; c. 1841 – 31 December 1891) was a Cambodian prince who was briefly a contender for the throne. He spent his entire life fighting his half brother King Norodom for the throne.

Si Votha was a grandson of King Ang Eng (reigning from 1772 to 1796) and a son of King Ang Duong. His biographical notes only record that he had a daughter named Neak Ang Mechas (Princess) Ang Duong Rath Votha. Si Votha had two half-brothers, Norodom and Sisowath of Cambodia, with Norodom being the king's chosen heir.

== Succession struggle and 1861 rebellion ==
Upon King Ang Duong's death, a succession struggle ensued, with Si Votha attempting to take power while his half brother Norodom was occupied with a rebellion; eventually Norodom gained the upper hand when he gained the backing of Sisowath.

When Norodom was officially crowned king in 1864 in a joint coronation ceremony supervised by the French and Siamese officials, Si Votha once again made no secret of his intention to lay claim to the Cambodian throne. Norodom's throne would have been extremely precarious without French support. Sisowath would likely have adopted the same attitude as Si Votha if the Siamese king had allowed him to leave Bangkok. Si Votha's long history of opposition to Norodom, which led him to lead a life of discomfort in the most isolated regions of the kingdom, suggests some deep personal antagonism between the two princes.

== 1876 Rebellion ==
During the 1870s, taking advantage of a new uprising against Norodom's authority, Si Votha swiftly returned to Cambodia from Thailand. Begging the pardon of the king of Siam for his unauthorized departure, Si Votha left Bangkok, swiftly passed through Battambang, and travelled onward to the higher region of the Mekong. He had little difficulty in quickly raising a large band of supporters and began to harry the officials loyal to King Norodom. He besieged the provincial capital at Kampong Thom and went through the turbulent province of Kampong Svai. Forces dispatched under Norodom's orders failed to apprehend him. As late as 1876, Si Votha remained in revolt, striking at an outpost of Norodom's government, and slipping back to his sanctuary among the Stiengs, one of the tribal groups on the fringes of Cambodian society.

== Resistance and 1885-1886 revolt ==
The French refused to help King Norodom put down Si Votha's revolt until the king concluded a treaty which advocated several reforms. By January 1877, the treaty was concluded and on 15 January, King Norodom proclaimed a series of reforms under the new treaty. In return, the French now bent their efforts to defeating Si Votha's uprising. Si Votha's uprising lasted until 1885-1886 with the help of Khmer Prince Duong Chakr, Norodom's own child. It was Norodom's prestige that ultimately brought Si Votha's resistance to an end. Si Votha, lurking on the northeastern boundaries of the kingdom, was a nuisance but nothing more. For the inhabitants of the northeastern region of Cambodia, Votha remained a king and he maintained his own small, if impoverished, court.

After the failure of his efforts in 1885-1886, his followers became fewer, dwindling to a few companions by the time he died. In the closing years of his life, Si Votha entered into hesitant and inconclusive negotiations with the French. Having grown tired of living amongst the less civilized hill tribe people in the jungle of northeastern Cambodia, Si Votha eventually submitted to the French. However, he strongly emphasized his refusal to submit to his half-brother, King Norodom.

The French, who were attempting to expand their influence in Cambodia at the time, were pleased by Si Votha's defeat, as he had been an outspoken critic of European colonialism in the area. Si Votha became something of a figurehead for resistance against the French. Si Votha's rebellion was largely unsuccessful, however, and in 1887, Cambodia was incorporated in the French-controlled Indochinese Union.

== Defeat and death ==
Almost totally abandoned by his followers and virtually without resources, Prince Si Votha died on the last day of 1891. Si Votha's life of perpetual dissidence had never brought him within certain reach of toppling Norodom from the throne. Backed by the French, Norodom had always been able to resist Si Votha's uprisings, despite the latter's popular appeal or gift of oratory.

Si Votha came to symbolise the first fight against the French colonial rule in Cambodia. But his rebellion was largely born out of jealousy and animosity toward his half brother King Norodom, rather than a desire for the independence of his country from France. During his time he was never considered an independence fighter but rather a rebellious usurper of the Cambodian throne.

== Descendants ==
His descendants from his daughter Princess Rathvothea ANG live nowadays in France under the name of Yosvara family tree. Yosvara Daradevy, his great-great-granddaughter, was a member of the FUNCIPEC party and worked in the Cabinet of Prime Minister Samdech Kompreah Norodom Ranariddh from 1994 to 1997 in International Cooperation section. Following the 1997 coup d'état, she returned to France and led her life as a teacher.

Prince Damrong Rajanubhab of Thailand said when he was ordained as a samanera (Buddhist novice) at Wat Bowonniwet, Si Votha was one of his teachers. When Si Votha lived at Wang Chao Khamen (Palace of Khmer princes) in Bangkok, he has only son named Ditsawong (ดิศวงศ์, also called Praditthawong ประดิษฐวงษ in a letter of Si Votha to Phraya Si Sahathep).

Ditsawong (died in 1903) and his family lived under the patronage of Damrong Rajanubhab. He has five children from two wives as follows:

- from Phuean (เผื่อน), his first wife
  - Thawin (ถวิล, daughter)
  - Wilat (วิลาศ, daughter)
- from Chan (จันทร์), his second wife
  - Phumriang (พุมเรียง, daughter)
  - Sangwian (สังเวียน, daughter)
  - Sarakham (สะราคำ, his only son)

Sarakham (1891-1969, 78 years old) worked as a judge in the Court of Justice of Thailand and had a noble title named "Phra Inthabenya" (พระอินทเบญญา). He used the surname "Wattha" (วัตถา) since 1914 following his grandfather's name "Si Votha", as suggested by Prince Svasti Sobhana. Phra Inthabenya (Sarakham Wattha) married with Phak Pinthatsathian (ภักดิ์ ปิ่นทัษเฐียร) and has three children: Thom (ธม, male), Thiat (เธียด, male) and Opal (โอปอ, female).
