= Norodom Yukanthor =

- Prince of Cambodia
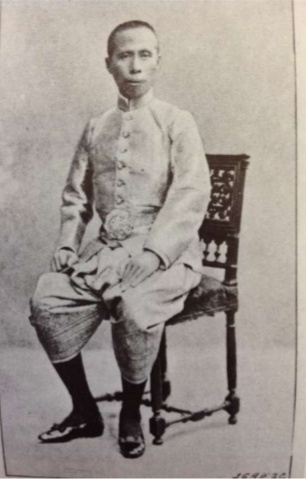
- Yukanthor in 1900
- Born: 1860; Phnom Penh, Cambodia
- Died: 27 June 1934 (aged 74); Bangkok, Siam
- House: Norodom
- Father: Norodom

Prince Norodom Arun Yukanthor (Khmer: នរោត្តម អរុណយុគន្ធរ, 1860 – 27 June 1934) was the eldest son of King Norodom of Cambodia.

== Personal life ==
Prince Yukanthor was born in 1860 (some sources say he was born in 1858) to either Preah Neang Brah Nan or Tep Soda Chan. He grew up in the Royal Palace in Phnom Penh as the oldest son of King Norodom, in a country more or less under French rule. A treaty signed 1863 between King Norodom and the French Admiral De La Grandiere made Cambodia its protectorate. But Norodom claimed that the French Admiral de la Grandière had forced him into signing the treaty. In 1872, Yukanthor was made to cut his hair and become a monk.

During 1884 the French started to lack resources to continue their colonization of Cambodia, and through administrative reforms they took control of financing resources like tax and likewise. Yukanthor got into a spat with Frenchman Lt. Radisson, who was accused of stealing one of Yukanthor's concubines, who was sold to the Prince by his father who was in a gambling debt.

Yukanthor, who was critical of French colonial rule in Cambodia due to the emergence of the new Cambodian middle class that the Royal Family was afraid would take power from them, sent a long memorandum to the French prime minister, campaign of publicity tour and when he visited France in 1900, he met the French journalist Jean Hess. Yukanthor was sent by his father, who was still upset about his blackmailing at the 1884 Thomson Convention. On 11 July 1897, the King was also deprived of his gambling profits, and the royal family had an alliance with French anti-imperialist radicals. Yukanthor became an influential figure in Parisian society, where he was invited to many parties and dinners in which he expressed his views on French colonialism, even having to flee to Brussels at one point. This became known as the Yukanthor Affair. During an interview with Hess, Yukanthor spoke about the French government and the French public, and the colonial domination of his country, published in Le Figaro newspaper, and the article spread the news of the affair. Yukanthor was made fun of by the French for being a small and dark-skinned man (158cm tall), with a small head.

Yukanthor's accusations were that the freely asked and granted protectorate of Cambodia had become a complete French colonial administration, that Norodom was forced to give up his power at gunpoint in 1884, that he was treated terribly by a Frenchman named de Verneville who abused his power with his mistress, the Mi-Ruong, that the Norodom "dynasty reigned for 3,000 years and has always cared for its people", and that the Cambodian "had become to slave inside the whims of (French) administrators". Yukanthor demanded the removal of the UM "who ran away before the enemy" in 1885, the Prime Minister, and Thiounn, secretary of the Council of Ministers, the latter two of which Yukanthor accused of being the "two main embezzlers of the country". His memorandum was sent to the President of the Council of Ministers, with a shorter one sent to the newspaper Le Matin and an even shorter one to Le Figaro.

In the letter sent to Le Figaro, Yukanthor said that there were two types of Frenchmen, those in Metropolitan France and those in the colonies, that the French knew "nothing about the Cambodians and believe we are barbarians", that France wants to impose its civilization, but "my family has ruled over the Kingdom for thousands of years", that labor should not be a punishment for sins, that Buddhism made the King the father of the people and Cambodians form a united family, that "we have our 'slaves', but your workers have the freedom to starve", "you make an ostentatious display of items of destruction in universal exhibitions", and that when Norodom asked for French protection, he did not ask for administration or civilization.

The French authorities ordered Sihanouk to cable his son to come home to Cambodia, and but for the fear of becoming arrested, he travelled to Thailand via Algeria, and after being banished by the French in 1900, he lived in exile in Bangkok from 1913 until his death in 1934. Yukanthor took the SMS Prinz Heinrich on 26 October 1900, and stopped in Singapore. On 27 September 1901, Norodom invited him back to Cambodia, a request that was refused. In 1926, the Governor-General gave him a small pension. King Norodom was heartbroken by what had happened to Yukanthor and his predecessor who traveled to France, Duong Chakr and retired to his palace in Phnom Penh. Some conspiracies claim that he secretly fled to Brussels instead and died later on.

Before he died in 1904, King Norodom appointed his son, Prince Yukanthor, as heir apparent to the throne. But because of Yukanthor's fall-out with the French, the Governor General Doumer threatened to dethrone him, and although bitter and disappointed with Sisowath, he made him heir to the throne.

== Family ==
Prince Yukanthor married four times, but finally settled with Princess Norodom Malika (1872–1951), who was his half sister, and they had four sons and five daughters, of which notable children include: Princess Pengpas Yukanthor (1892–1969), Princess Robangpas Yukanthor (born 1893), Princess Pingpeang Yukanthor (1894–1966), who later became an important political activist, and Prince Heanh Wachhiravongs (1896–1969). Malika founded a private girls' school on 11 December 1911, at which her daughters were taught.

== See also ==
- House of Norodom
