= Norodom Narindrapong =

Cambodian prince

Norodom Narindrapong នរោត្តម នរិន្រ្ទពង្ស
- Prince of Cambodia
- Born: 18 September 1954; Phnom Penh, Cambodia
- Died: 7 October 2003 (aged 49); Paris, France
- Spouse: Eak Seenuanand
- Issue: Princess Norodom Simonarine; Princess Norodom Moninouk
- House: Norodom
- Father: Norodom Sihanouk
- Mother: Norodom Monineath

Norodom Narindrapong (Khmer: នរោត្តម នរិន្រ្ទពង្ស [nɔroːɗɑm nɔrɨntreaʔpɔŋ]; 18 September 1954 – 7 October 2003) was a Prince of Cambodia. He was born in Phnom Penh to King Father Norodom Sihanouk and Queen Mother Norodom Monineath Sihanouk.

== Biography ==
The prince studied philosophy, criminology, and law at the Moscow State University, and spoke fluent French and Russian. Prince Narindrapong died in his Paris apartment from a heart attack on 7 October 2003 at the age of 49. He was married and had two daughters:

Styles of Norodom Narindrapong Prince of Cambodia
- Reference style: His Royal Highness
- Spoken style: Your Royal Highness

- Princess Norodom Simonarine (born 23 September 1983).
- Princess Norodom Moninouk (born 18 March 1987).

He was the younger full brother of King Norodom Sihamoni and half-brother to 12 other siblings.
