= Soma Norodom =

Soma Serei Norodom
- Princess of Cambodia
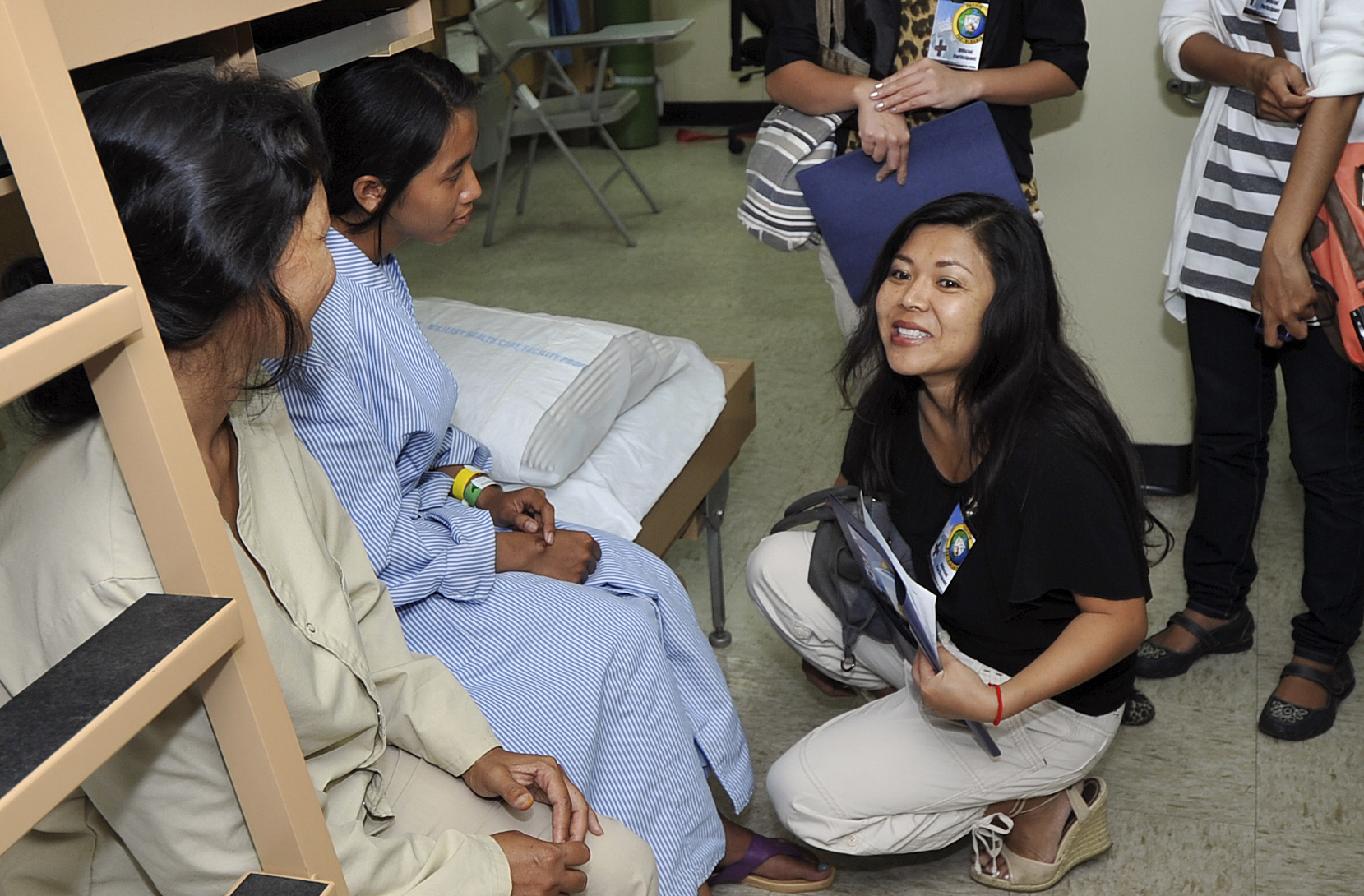
- Princess Soma Norodom visiting patients aboard a US Navy hospital ship in Sihanoukville, 2012
- King: Norodom Sihamoni
- Born: 29 October 1969 (age 56); Phnom Penh, Cambodia
- House: Norodom
- Father: Norodom Vatvani
- Mother: Norodom Sosony

Soma Serei Norodom (Khmer: សោម៉ា សិរី នរោត្តម; born October 29, 1969) is a newspaper columnist, philanthropist and princess of the Cambodian royal House of Norodom. Raised in the United States, she returned to Cambodia in 2010 and began writing columns for the Phnom Penh Post. Referring to herself as "the Royal Rebel", many of her columns have been critical of the Cambodian government or members of the royal family, causing the Cambodian government to express their annoyance at her work. Princess Soma has been active in charity work for various NGOs and founded her own not-for-profit organization, the Soma Norodom Foundation. Her official title is Neak Ang Machas Ksatrei (Khmer: អ្នកអង្គម្ចាស់ក្សត្រី), with the English language style of "Highness", elevated on May 21, 2011 from "her excellency, Brhat Varman".

== Family ==
Her father, Prince Vatvani Norodom, a third cousin of both current king, Norodom Sihamoni, and former Prime Minister Prince Norodom Ranariddh, was a lieutenant-colonel in the Khmer Air Force during the Cambodian Civil War assigned as the commandant of Battambang Air Force Base. In 1971 he was promoted to full colonel and made Cambodian Representative to US Forces in Vietnam. Subsequently, he was stationed as the Military Liaison Officer to the USAF at Udorn in Thailand until the 1975 fall of Phnom Penh when he fled with his family to the United States. Upon his return to Cambodia in 1993, he was made major-general and then lieutenant-general and given the position of Commander-in-Chief of the Royal Cambodian Air Force, a post which he held until the 1997 Cambodian Coup which resulted in Hun Sen consolidating his power and expelling Ranariddh and his allies. Her father died in Phnom Penh in 2012.

Princess Soma's mother, Princess Sosony Norodom, was Vatvani's second wife, whom he married in 1969. Soma is directly descended from Norodom I, the founder of the House of Norodom. She is his great-great-great granddaughter as well as the third cousin (once removed) of the current king, Norodom Sihamoni, and fourth cousin of former MP Norodom Rattana Devi. Soma has one younger brother, three younger sisters and an older half brother from her father's first marriage. All of her siblings remain in the United States.

== Personal life ==
Princess Soma was born in Phnom Penh in 1969, six years before the fall of the capital to the Khmer Rouge. In 1975, her father brought her and her family to resettle in Long Beach, California where she was raised. After graduating from Chaffey High School in Ontario, Soma attended Fresno State earning a bachelor's degree in telecommunications in 1993 with an emphasis in news and public affairs. She proceeded to obtain a master's degree in mass communication from Fresno State in 1996. She married Everett Balber in Fresno, but was divorced in 2005. After a series of jobs in media and marketing, Soma decided to return to Cambodia in 2010 to care for her father, whose health had begun to decline.

== Career ==
- Styles of Soma Serei Norodom
- Reference style: Her Highness
- Spoken style: Your Highness

In the US, Soma held various jobs including sports commentator and director of marketing for the all-female TV sports talk show "Ladies in the Locker Room". Once in Cambodia, Soma began the first English language educational talk show in the country, "Pannasastra University of Cambodia (PUC) Radio Talk Show". Through this program, which became the highest-rated radio show in six provinces, including the capital, she interviewed close to 200 business and government officials, educators and entertainment personalities. Soma developed a passion for children's issues and, especially, education. She began volunteering for activist events and NGOs including International Day of the Girl, and the Happy Tree Orphanage, which cares for children with HIV. She then founded the not-for-profit Soma Norodom Foundation, which provides scholarships for disadvantaged adolescents in Cambodia to attend school. As a dual citizen of the US and Cambodia, she makes frequent trips to the United States to visit family and for speaking engagements. She is also an active volunteer in US charities including Toys for Tots Foundation, Boys & Girls Clubs of America and Big Brothers Big Sisters.

In 2012, disheartened by both the poverty of the average Cambodian and the extent of corruption in Cambodia's government and media, Soma became a columnist for a national newspaper, the Phnom Penh Post. Her column, entitled "Royal Rebel, The Social Agenda with Princess Soma Norodom", quickly became the most read section of the newspaper. Refusing to take government bribes to write favorable pieces, Soma wrote columns aimed at exposing weaknesses in Cambodian society, including corruption and the shortcomings of the royal family. After writing a piece entitled "We Should Be United" exploring the possible future of the royal family, she was charged with "incitement" and briefly detained. Although she refused to retract her column, she was released and the charges were dropped. She has stated that she feared for her life at that point.
