= Norodom Suramarit =

King of Cambodia from 1955 to 1960

- Preah Moha Kanhchan Kaot
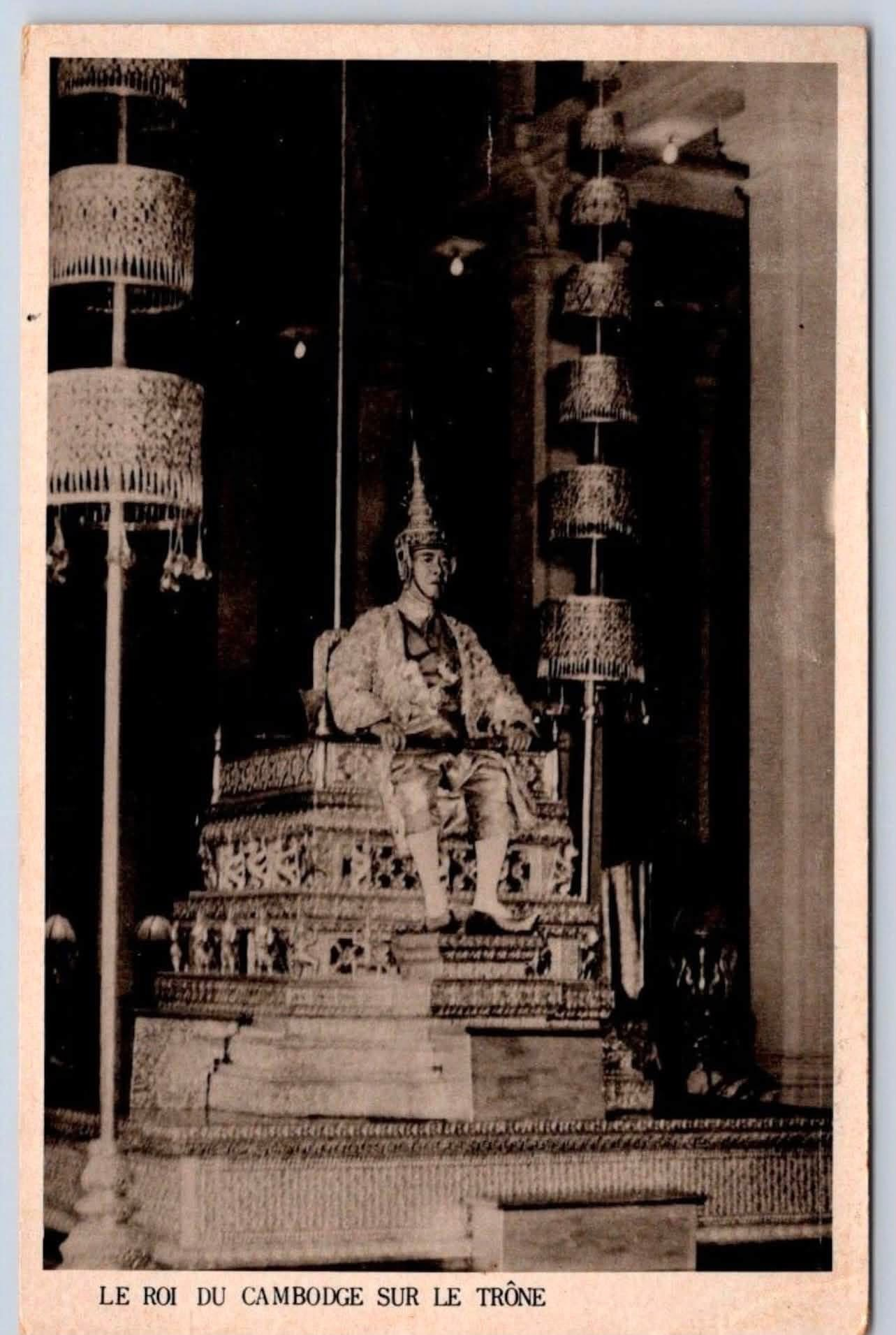
- Suramarit c. 1956

King of Cambodia
- Reign: 3 March 1955 – 3 April 1960
- Coronation: 5 March 1956
- Predecessor: Norodom Sihanouk
- Successor: Chuop Hell (acting) as Head of State
- Prime ministers: See list: Leng Ngeth Norodom Sihanouk Oum Chheang Sun Khim Tit San Yun Sim Var Ek Yi Oun Penn Nouth
- Born: 6 March 1896; Phnom Penh, Cambodia, French Indochina
- Died: 3 April 1960 (aged 64); Khemarin Palace, Phnom Penh, Cambodia
- Burial: Silver Pagoda, Royal Palace, Phnom Penh, Cambodia (interment of ashes)
- Spouse: Sisowath Kossamak (m. 1920)
- Issue: Norodom Sihanouk; Norodom Vichara; Norodom Sirivudh; Norodom Preysophon
- House: Norodom
- Father: Norodom Sutharot
- Mother: Norodom Phangangam
- Religion: Theravada Buddhism

Modern kings of Cambodia
- Ang Duong
- Norodom
- Sisowath
- Sisowath Monivong
- Norodom Sihanouk (first reign)
- Norodom Suramarit
- Sisowath Kossamak (ceremonial queen)
- Norodom Sihanouk (second reign)
- Norodom Sihamoni

Norodom Suramarit (Khmer: នរោត្តម សុរាម្រិត, Nôrodâm Sŏramruĕt [nɔˈroːɗɑm soˈraːmrɨt]; 6 March 1896 – 3 April 1960) was King of Cambodia from 3 March 1955 until his death in 1960. He was the father of King Norodom Sihanouk and the grandfather of Cambodia's current king, Norodom Sihamoni. Suramarit was born in Phnom Penh to Prince Norodom Sutharot. When his grandfather King Norodom died in 1904, Norodom's brother Sisowath took the throne. King Sisowath died in 1927 and was succeeded by his son Sisowath Monivong.

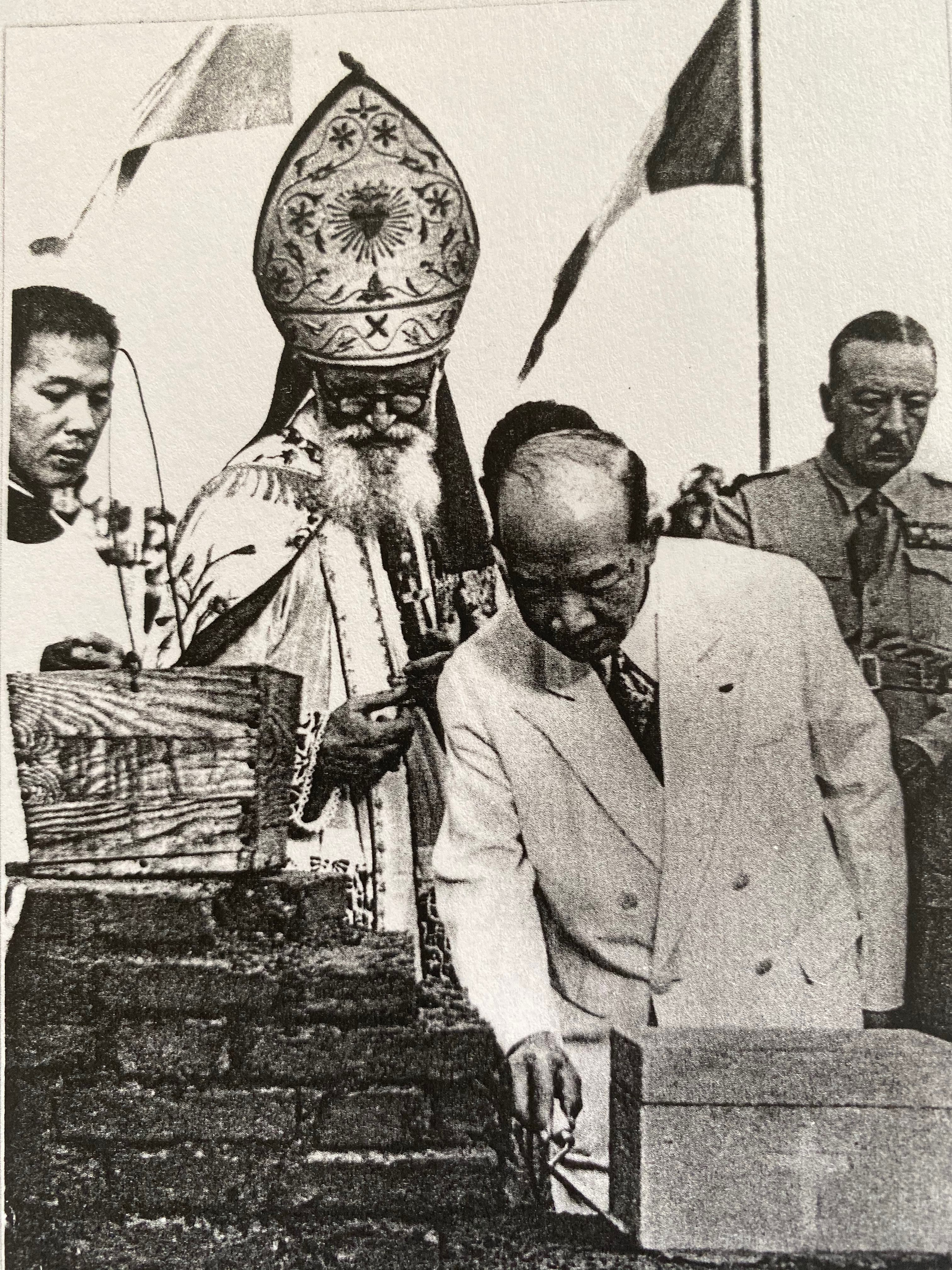
Suramarit laying a brick for the Roman Catholic Cathedral of Phnom Penh, c. 1952

Suramarit married Monivong's daughter Sisowath Kossamak. Upon Monivong's death in 1941, Sihanouk, Suramarit's son and Monivong's grandson, was selected as the new king. In 1955, Sihanouk abdicated in favor of his father. He was formally crowned on 5 March 1956, the day before his 60th birthday.

Following Suramarit's death in 1960, Sihanouk became Chief of State, while Suramarit's wife Sisowath Kosamak became Queen. Suramarit was given the posthumous title of Preah Karona Preah Norodom Suramarit Preah Moha Kanhchan Kaot (ព្រះករុណាព្រះនរោត្តមសុម្រិត ព្រះមហាកាញ្ចនកោដ្ឋ).

== Ancestry ==
Ancestors of Norodom Suramarit

8. Ang Duong (=12)
4. Norodom of Cambodia (=6)
9. Pen (=13)
2. Norodom Sutharot
10. Battambang bureaucrat
5. Bossaba Yem
11.
1. Norodom Suramarit
12. Ang Duong (=8)
6. Norodom of Cambodia (=4)
13. Pen (=9)
3. Norodom Phangangam
14. Lothia Sa
7. Bopha Nuon

== Honours ==
=== National ===
- Knight Grand Cross of the Royal Order of Cambodia (1941)

=== Foreign ===
- Grand Commander of the Most Glorious Order of the Truth (Agga Maha Thiri Thudhamma) (Burma)
- Commander of the Order of the Legion of Honour (French Republic, 1939)
- Grand Officer of the Order of the Legion of Honour (French Republic)
- Knight Grand Cordon of the Supreme Order of the Crysanthemun (Empire of Japan)
- Knight Grand Cross of the Order of the Million Elephants and the White Parasol (Kingdom of Laos, 1955)
- Knight of the Most Illustrious Order of the Royal House of Chakri (Kingdom of Thailand)
- Knight Grand Cordon of the Order of the Dragon of Annam (Empire of Vietnam)
- Knight Grand Cross of the National Order of Vietnam (Empire of Vietnam)
- Honorary Recipient of the Order of the Crown of the Realm (Malaysia)
- Honorary Recipient of the Order of Suvorov, 1st class (Soviet Union, 7 July 1956)
- Knight Grand Cordon of the Order of the White Lion (Czechoslovakia, 14 July 1956)
- Great Star of the Order of the Yugoslav Star (6 August 1957)

Norodom Suramarit House of Norodom Born: 6 March 1896 Died: 3 April 1960
Regnal titles
Preceded by Norodom Sihanouk	King of Cambodia; 1955–1960	Succeeded by Sisowath Kossamak (disputed)
