= Norodom Ekcharin =

Prince of Cambodia (1969-1976)

- Prince of Cambodia
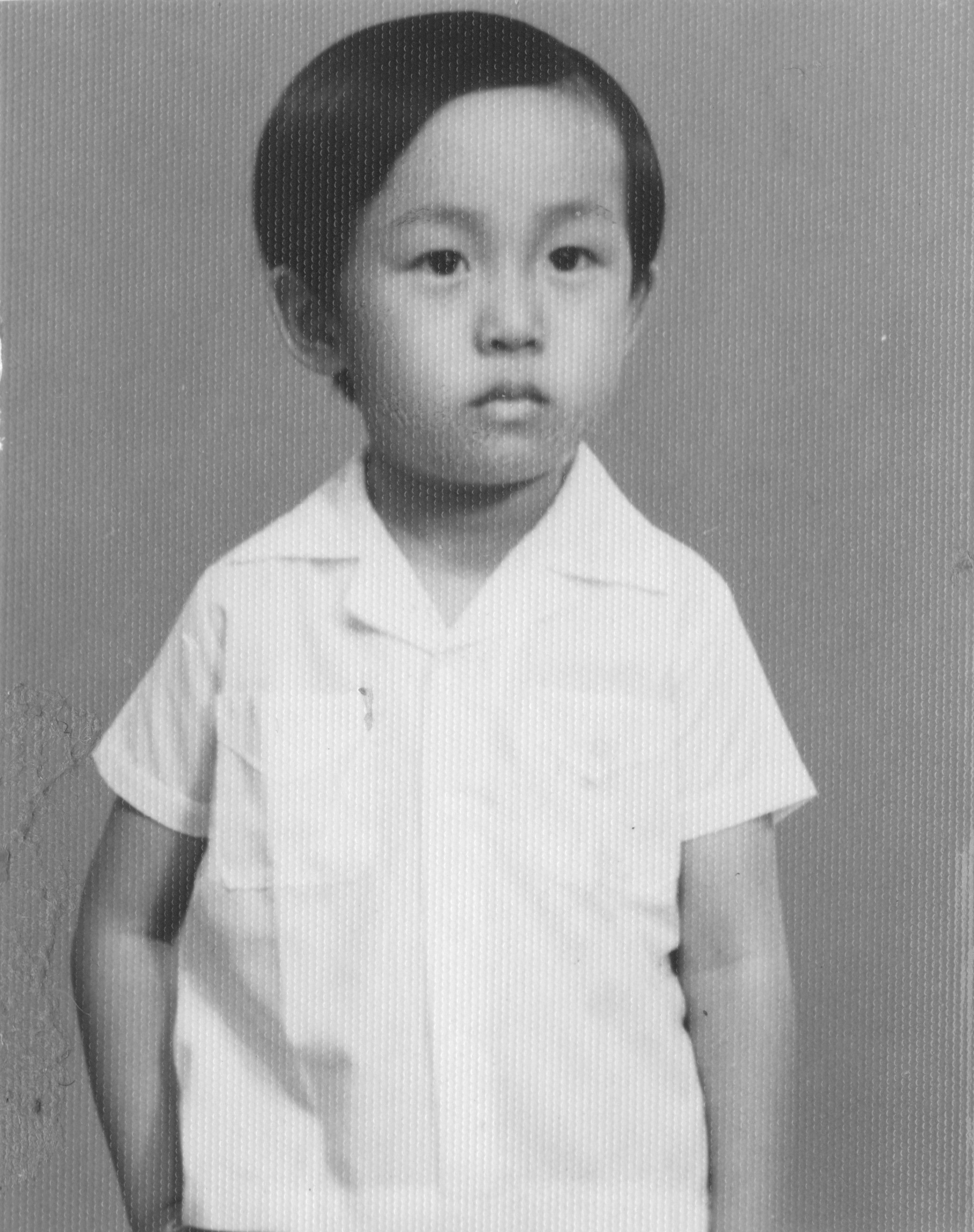
- Born: 15 April 1969; Phnom Penh, Cambodia
- Died: 1976 (presumptive); Cambodia
- House: Norodom
- Father: Norodom Yuvaneath
- Mother: Tea Kim Yin

Prince Norodom Ekcharin (Khmer: នរោត្តម វជ្ជរិន្រ្ទ, born 1969 - 1976?) is the second son of Prince Norodom Yuvaneath and the grandchild of the late King of Cambodia, Norodom Sihanouk. It is believed that Prince Norodom Ekcharin died as a child during a massacre by the Khmer Rouge in 1976. He is known for having an imposter who, at one point, was accepted into the royal family.

== Life and family separation ==
Norodom Ekcharin was born in 1969 to parents Prince Norodom Yuvaneath and his wife Tea Kim Yin in Phnom Penh. Following the 1970 coup by General Lon Nol that ended the monarchy, Yuveneath and his wife were not permitted to re-enter the country as they had been visiting Singapore, leaving Ekcharin behind in Cambodia. Yuvaneath and his family fled to Beijing, where they lived until 1975. In 1975, he and the family immigrated to Hong Kong, and in 1980, to the United States.

When the Khmer Rouge took Phnom Penh in 1976, Ekcharin was presumed to have been killed, though his body, like that of thousands of Cambodians, was not found.

== Imposter ==
A resident of Sweden named Charin Norodom appeared in the early 2010s and claimed to have survived the massacre and to have been secretly smuggled to Thailand. He stated that he was sneaked into a refugee camp in Surin from where he was transported to Sweden, and only knew that his father was a prince, without any more detail. Charin's identity as Ekcharin was questioned by some, however, he was officially recognised by the royal family in 2017.

Charin made headlines in 2012, while living in Sweden, for pressing for a living wage for Cambodian workers in H&M clothing factories. He later moved to Phnom Penh.

In 2021, a DNA test revealed that Charin was not Tea Kim Yin's biological son, and that Charin had falsified a DNA report he had originally provided. Yuvaneath died before the hoax was confirmed. The DNA swab collections of both Charin and Tea Kim Yin were conducted by Chiravouth Norodom, the first son of Yuvaneath and Tea Kim Yin, and Charin's alleged brother. As a result, Charin was expelled from the royal family.

== Gallery ==
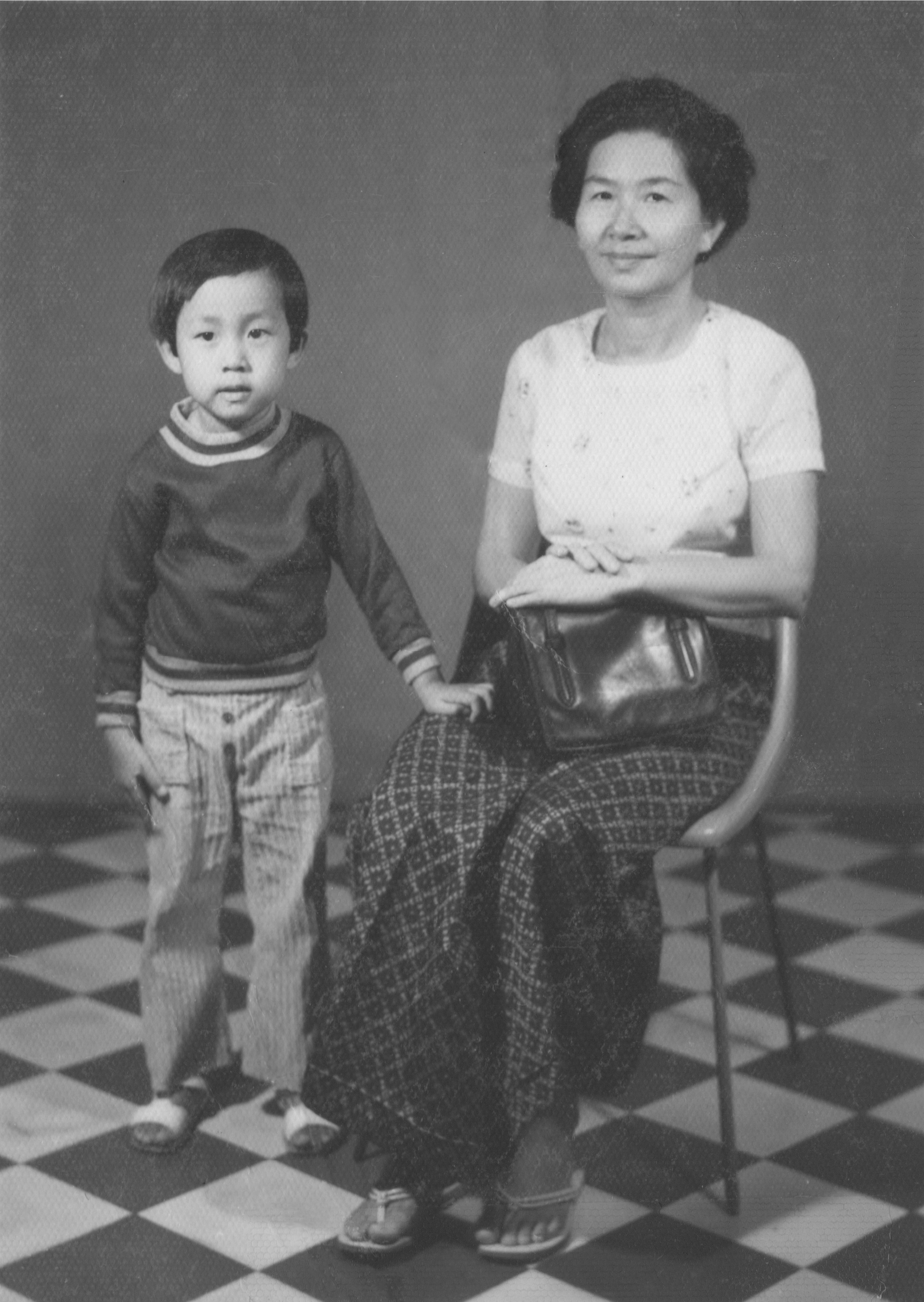
Ekcharin and maternal grandma, Phnom Penh, March 1974

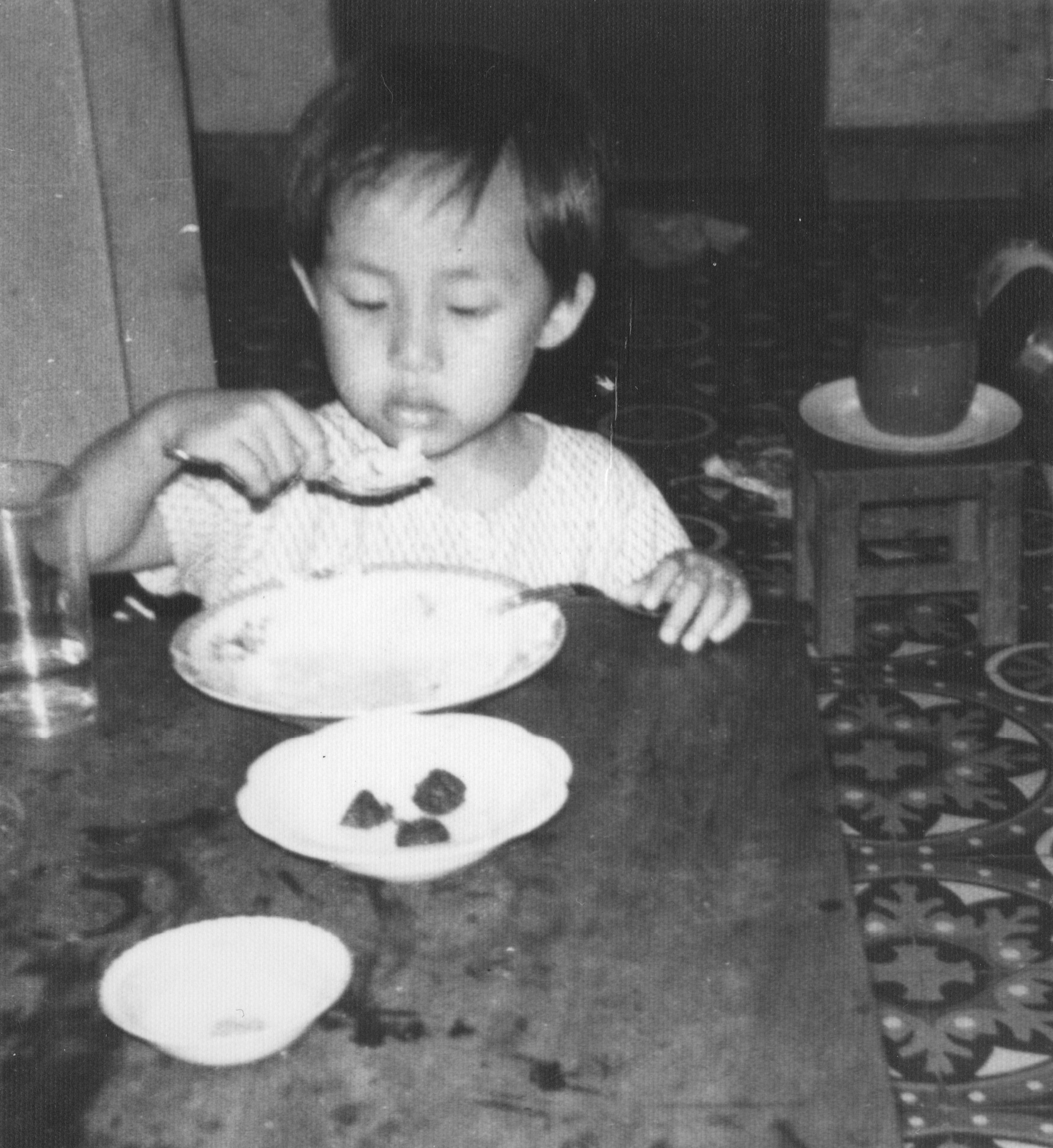
A young Ekcharin Norodom eating rice with a spoon, December 1973

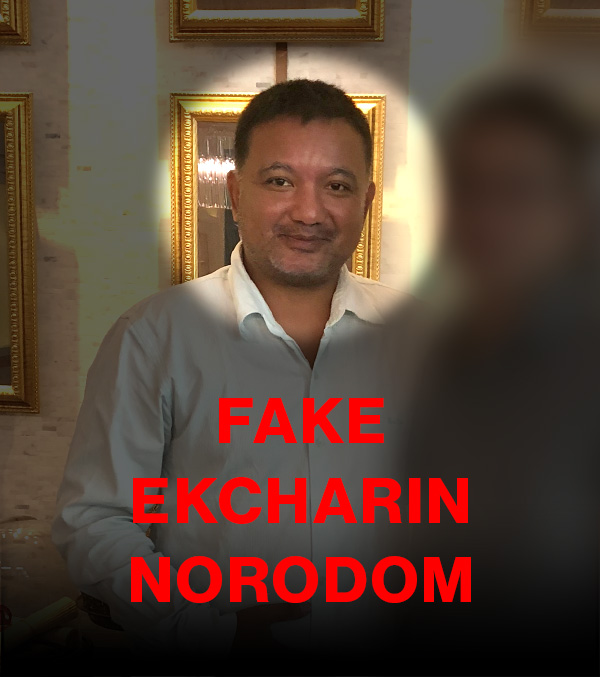
Charin Norodom (the imposter), 2015

== See also ==
- House of Norodom
