= Norodom Monineath =

Queen of Cambodia from 1993 to 2004

Norodom Monineath Sihanouk នរោត្ដម មុនិនាថ សីហនុ
- Queen Mother of Cambodia

Queen consort of Cambodia
- Tenure: 24 September 1993 – 7 October 2004
- Born: Paule Monique Izzi; 18 June 1936 (age 90); Saigon, Cochinchina, French Indochina (now Ho Chi Minh City, Vietnam)
- Spouse: Norodom Sihanouk (m. 1955; died 2012)
- Issue: Norodom Sihamoni; Norodom Narindrapong
- House: Norodom (by marriage)
- Father: Jean-François Izzi
- Mother: Pomme Peang
- Religion: Theravada Buddhism

Norodom Monineath Sihanouk (Khmer: នរោត្ដម មុនិនាថ សីហនុ, pronounced [nɔroːtɗɑm mɔniːniət səjhanuʔ]; born Paule Monique Izzi; 18 June 1936) is the Queen Mother of Cambodia. She was queen consort of Cambodia from 1993 to 2004, as the wife of King Sihanouk. She is the widow of King Norodom Sihanouk, whom she married in 1955 as the "secondary consort" (Sihanouk married his official wife, Norodom Thavet Norleak, as the "first lady" also in 1955, before being married to Monineath). After Sihanouk and Norleak divorced in 1968, Monineath became the official spouse of the King.

Queen Norodom Monineath Sihanouk and King Norodom Sihanouk had two children: Norodom Sihamoni and Norodom Narindrapong; both were born before their parents married. Her official, full title is "Samdech Preah Mahaksatrey Norodom Monineath Sihanouk" (Khmer: សម្តេចព្រះមហាក្សត្រី នរោត្តម មុនិនាថ សីហនុ). The Queen is also called "Preah Voreakreach Meada Jeat Khmer" (Khmer: ព្រះវររាជមាតាជាតិខ្មែរ, lit. 'mother of the Khmer nation'). Her birthday on 18 June is an official public holiday in Cambodia.

== Biography ==
=== Early life ===
Norodom Monineath was born on 18 June 1936, in Saigon, French Indochina, in present-day Vietnam. She was born Paule-Monique Izzi, and is sometimes referred to as Queen Monique. Her father, Jean-François Izzi, was a French banker of Corsican, French and Italian descent, who was Director of Crédit Foncier in Saigon, and killed in World War II (he was a close friend of King Norodom Suramarit). Her mother, Pomme Peang, was from Phnom Penh (and was previously the third wife of Prince Norodom Duong Chakr).

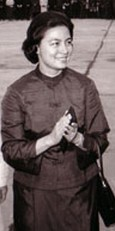
Norodom Monineath Sihanouk in 1972, during a visit to the Socialist Republic of Romania

Norodom Monineath studied at the Primary School Norodom College, Sisowath High School, and the Lycée René Descartes. She met Norodom Sihanouk in 1951, when he awarded her first prize in a beauty pageant. They lived together from 12 April 1952, and married on 5 March 1955 at Khemerin Palace, as the "secondary consort" (Sihanouk married his official wife, Norodom Thavet Norleak, on 4 March 1955, before being married to Monineath). She has been described as the close confidant of Sihanouk.

=== 1955–1970 ===
In 1955, Princess Monique's husband abdicated in favor of his father, but continued to rule the country as premier. In 1960, he became head of state again, but known as premier and with the title prince. Princess Monique served as president of the Cambodian Red Cross (CRC) in 1967–1970.

Princess Monique, as she was called during this period, was exposed to some criticism from the Khmer Republic for her life during the reign of Sihanouk in the 1960s. The propaganda of the Khmer Republic was later to accuse her of having caused the strained relationship between Sihanouk and his mother, the popular queen mother Sisowath Kossamak, and for being the cause to why her spouse prevented his mother from succeeding to the throne in 1960.

The Khmer Republic propaganda claimed that she had advised Sihanouk to introduce the unpopular state casino, which was at the time viewed as a symbol of national decadence, and alleged that she, her mother Madame Pomme, and her brother Oum Manorine contributed to corruption by promoting proteges to lucrative offices. The Khmer Republic reportedly once burned her image in effigy for corruption.

=== Khmer Rouge ===
After the Cambodian coup of 1970, she joined her husband in exile first in Beijing in China and then North Korea. As guests of the North Korean leader Kim Il Sung, a palace with 60 rooms was given to them as their residence during their stay. In 1973, Norodom Sihanouk allied himself with the Khmer Rouge against their common enemy, Lon Nol. The royal couple also made a visit to Khmer Rouge territory in Cambodia before returning to China.

After the fall of Phnom Penh to the Khmer Rouge in April 1975, she returned to the royal palace in Phnom Penh in Cambodia with her husband, who was appointed nominal head of state by the Khmer Rouge. From 1976 onward, however, they were both kept under house arrest by the Khmer Rouge. They were reportedly subjected to a political re-education program during these years, and at least 18 members of the extended royal house were killed. Reportedly, the regime suggested to have them executed, but this was prevented by intervention by China and North Korea.

In January 1979, Pol Pot allowed for her and her husband to be evacuated from Cambodia by the Chinese. The original plan was to evacuate only Sihanouk and Monineath, but Pol Pot himself insisted that all members of the royal house should be given a place on the Chinese plane.

=== Later life ===
Norodom Monineath spent the following years with her husband as state guests of China and North Korea. She is credited to have played some part in the peace negotiations arranged between Sihanouk and Hun Sen by Tong Siv Eng in 1987 and 1988, and she is known to have been present during the negotiations.

In 1991, she returned to Cambodia with Sihanouk. On 22 February 1992, she was elevated by the King to the rank of Samdech Preah Cheayea. On 24 September 1993, she was raised to the rank of Samdech Preah Mohèsey Norodom Monineath of Cambodia. On 2 January 1996, the King elevated her to the rank of Samdech Preah Reach Akka Mohèsey Norodom Monineath.

Sihanouk reportedly suggested to change the constitution to make it possible for her to be a regent and succeed him on the throne, but ultimately, this did not come about, and he chose to abdicate in favor of their son instead.

Monineath speaks Khmer, French, and English. She is currently the Cambodian Red Cross Honorary President.

In 2010 she was nominated for Time Person of the Year by Documentation Center of Cambodia Director Youk Chhang who praised the Queen Mother as an "embodiment of resilience, dignity and courage."

== Children ==
The late King Father and the Queen Mother have two sons, both born before they got married:

- Norodom Sihamoni (born 14 May 1953); was given the title of Samdech Krom Khun by HM the King in 1994 and was Ambassador of Cambodia to UNESCO in Paris. He is the current King of Cambodia.
- Norodom Narindrapong (18 September 1954 – 7 October 2003) has two daughters.

== Patronages ==
- President of Honour of the Cambodian Red Cross Society (President from 1967 until 1970).
- Co-president of the Funcinpec Party (from 1989 until 1992).

== Titles styles and honours ==
Styles of Queen Norodom Monineath of Cambodia
- Reference style: Her Majesty
- Spoken style: Your Majesty

- 1955–1993: Her Royal Highness Princess Monique of Cambodia
- 1993–1996: Her Majesty Queen Norodom Monineath of Cambodia, Samdech Preah Mohèsey Norodom Monineath of Cambodia (សម្តេចព្រះមហេសី នរោត្តម មុនិនាថ នៃព្រះរាជាណាចក្រកម្ពុជា)
- 1996–2004: Her Majesty Queen Norodom Monineath of Cambodia, Samdech Preah Reach Akka Mohèsey Norodom Monineath (សម្តេចព្រះរាជអគ្គមហេសី នរោត្តម មុនិនាថ នៃព្រះរាជាណាចក្រកម្ពុជា)
- 2004–present: Her Majesty Queen Norodom Monineath ,Queen mother of Cambodia (Samdech Preah Mahaksatrey Norodom Monineath Sihanouk , សម្តេចព្រះមហាក្សត្រី នរោត្តម មុនិនាថ សីហនុ)

The Queen is also called "Preah Voreakreach Meada Jeat Khmer" (Khmer: ព្រះវររាជមាតាជាតិខ្មែរ, lit. 'mother of the Khmer nation').

=== National ===
- Knight Grand Cross of the Royal Order of Cambodia

=== Foreign ===
- China: Order of Friendship (6 November 2020)
- Ethiopia: Dame Grand Cordon of the Order of the Queen of Sheba (7 May 1968)
- Malaysia:
  - Honorary Recipient of the Order of the Crown of the Realm (1996)
  - Honorary Grand Commander of the Order of the Defender of the Realm (1963)
- Mali: Grand Cross of the National Order of Mali (1973)
