= House of Norodom =

Royal house of Cambodia

House of Norodom រាជវង្សនរោត្តម
- Royal Arms of the King of Cambodia
- Parent house: Varman dynasty; House of Oudong
- Country: Cambodia
- Founded: 19 October 1860; 166 years ago
- Founder: Norodom
- Current head: Norodom Sihamoni
- Titles: King of Cambodia; Queen of Cambodia; Queen Mother of Cambodia
- Styles: Samdech Krom Preah; Samdech Krom Khun; Samdech Krom Loung; Samdech Preah Anoch; Samdech Preah Ream; Samdech Preah Mohessara
- Members: List
- Connected families: House of Sisowath

The House of Norodom (Khmer: រាជវង្សនរោត្តម, UNGEGN: Réachôvôngs Nôroŭttâm, ALA-LC: Rājavangs Narottam [riəceaʔʋɔŋ nɔroːɗɑm]; lit. 'Norodom dynasty') is the ruling royal house of Cambodia. Its members are direct descendants of King Norodom (1860–1904), a son of the "Great-King", Ang Duong. The current head of the House of Norodom is the current king of Cambodia, Norodom Sihamoni. Norodom is one of the two royal houses of Cambodia. Its counterpart, the House of Sisowath, is named after another son of Ang Duong, Sisowath. Four members have served as Kings of Cambodia, and three as Prime Ministers.

== History ==
The Royal House of Norodom traces its origins to King Ang Duong (1796–1860), who reigned from 1848 until his death. During his reign, Cambodia was caught between the regional powers of Siam and Vietnam, both of which frequently interfered in Cambodian politics. Ang Duong, who had spent many years in the Siamese court, sought to strengthen Cambodia’s sovereignty by reviving Khmer culture, reforming administration, and cautiously reaching out to France for protection against its neighbors. Although he died before completing negotiations, his foreign policy laid the foundation for Cambodia’s later relationship with France.

Following Ang Duong’s death in 1860, his eldest son, Prince Norodom (1834–1904), was chosen as the new monarch. His enthronement formally established the House of Norodom as a distinct branch of the Cambodian royal family. In 1863, King Norodom signed a treaty with France, placing Cambodia under French protection while preserving the monarchy. This marked the beginning of nearly ninety years of French colonial influence, during which the throne alternated at times between the House of Norodom and the House of Sisowath, another branch descending from King Ang Duong.

The House of Norodom returned to prominence in 1941, when the French authorities selected Norodom Sihanouk, great-grandson of Norodom I, to become king. Sihanouk reigned during World War II and led Cambodia to independence from France in 1953, becoming the most prominent monarch of the dynasty. In 1955 he abdicated in favor of his father, Norodom Suramarit, and assumed the role of Head of State after Suramarit’s death in 1960. Sihanouk was deposed in 1970 following a coup d'etat by General Lon Nol, which abolished the monarchy and established the Khmer Republic.

During the Khmer Rouge regime (1975–1979), Sihanouk was briefly installed as head of state before being placed under house arrest. After the fall of the Khmer Rouge, he continued to play a role in Cambodian politics from exile. In 1993, following United Nations–organized elections, the monarchy was restored as a constitutional institution and Sihanouk was reinstated as king. He reigned until his abdication in 2004, citing age and health concerns.

In October 2004, the Royal Council of the Throne elected Norodom Sihamoni, son of Norodom Sihanouk, as king. Sihamoni remains the current monarch of Cambodia, continuing the legacy of the House of Norodom into the 21st century.

== Members ==
- Norodom (1834–1904)
- Norodom Yukanthor (1860–1934)
- Norodom Malika (1872–1951)
- Norodom Sutharot (1872–1945)
- Norodom Phangangam (1874–1944)
- Norodom Kanviman Norleak Tevi (1876–1912)
- Norodom Singhara (?)
- Norodom Suramarit (1896–1960)
- Sisowath Kossamak (by marriage; 1904–1975)
- Norodom Phurissara (1919–1976)
- Norodom Kantol (1920–1976)
- Norodom Sihanouk (1922–2012)
- Norodom Viriya (born 1926)
- Norodom Thavet Norleak (?)
- Norodom Monineath Sihanouk (by marriage; born 1936)
- Norodom Montana (1902–1975)
- Norodom Buppha Devi (1943–2019)
- Norodom Yuvaneath (1943–2021)
- Norodom Chhavann-rangsi
- Norodom Yuveakduri
- Norodom Veakchearavouth
- Norodom Ekcharin
- Norodom Pekina
- Norodom Yuveakdevi
- Norodom Ranariddh (1944–2021)
- Norodom Chakrapong (born 1945)
- Norodom Kachanipha Chakrapong (?)
- Norodom Vichara (1946–2013)
- Norodom Naradipo (1946–1976)
- Norodom Marie Ranariddh (by marriage; born 1948)
- Norodom Kuntha Bopha (1948–1952)
- Norodom Sirivudh (born 1951)
- Norodom Sihamoni (born 1953)
- Norodom Narindrapong (1954–2003)
- Norodom Arunrasmy (born 1955)
- Norodom Ravivong (?)
- Norodom Sorya Roeungsi (?)
- Norodom Kantha Bopha (?)
- Norodom Khemanourak (?)
- Norodom Botum Bopha (?)
- Norodom Sujata (?)
- Norodom Vatvani (?)
- Norodom Sosony (?)
- Norodom Soma (born 1969)
- Norodom Rattana Devi (born 1974)
- Norodom Jenna (born 2012)

== List of Norodom monarchs ==
Portrait	Name	Reign		
Portrait	Name	From	To	Duration
	Norodom នរោត្តម (b. 1834 – d. 1904)	19 October 1860	24 April 1904	43 years, 188 days
	Norodom Sihanouk នរោត្តម សីហនុ (b. 1922 – d. 2012)	24 April 1941	2 March 1955	13 years, 312 days
	Norodom Sihanouk នរោត្តម សីហនុ (b. 1922 – d. 2012)	24 September 1993	7 October 2004	11 years, 13 days
	Norodom Suramarit នរោត្តម សុរាម្រិត (b. 1896 – d. 1960)	3 March 1955	3 April 1960	5 years, 31 days
	Norodom Sihamoni នរោត្តម សីហមុនី (b. 1953)	14 October 2004	Present	22 years, 25 days

== List of Norodom consorts ==
Portrait	Name	Reign		
Portrait	Name	From	To	Duration
	Norodom Monineath Sihanouk នរោត្តម មុនិនាថ សីហនុ (b. 1936)	24 September 1993	7 October 2004	11 years, 13 days

== List of Norodom prime ministers ==
Portrait	Name	In office			Party
Portrait	Name	From	To	Duration	Party
	Norodom Sihanouk នរោត្តម សីហនុ (b. 1922 – d. 2012)	18 March 1945	13 August 1945	148 days	Independent
	Norodom Sihanouk នរោត្តម សីហនុ (b. 1922 – d. 2012)	28 April 1950	30 May 1950	32 days	Independent
	Norodom Sihanouk នរោត្តម សីហនុ (b. 1922 – d. 2012)	16 June 1952	24 January 1953	222 days	Independent
	Norodom Sihanouk នរោត្តម សីហនុ (b. 1922 – d. 2012)	7 April 1954	18 April 1954	11 days	Independent
	Norodom Sihanouk នរោត្តម សីហនុ (b. 1922 – d. 2012)	3 October 1955	5 January 1956	94 days	Sangkum
	Norodom Sihanouk នរោត្តម សីហនុ (b. 1922 – d. 2012)	1 March 1956	24 March 1956	23 days	Sangkum
	Norodom Sihanouk នរោត្តម សីហនុ (b. 1922 – d. 2012)	15 September 1956	15 October 1956	30 days	Sangkum
	Norodom Sihanouk នរោត្តម សីហនុ (b. 1922 – d. 2012)	9 April 1957	7 July 1957	89 days	Sangkum
	Norodom Sihanouk នរោត្តម សីហនុ (b. 1922 – d. 2012)	10 July 1958	19 April 1960	1 year, 284 days	Sangkum
	Norodom Sihanouk នរោត្តម សីហនុ (b. 1922 – d. 2012)	17 November 1961	13 February 1962	88 days	Sangkum
	Norodom Kantol នរោត្តម កន្តុល (b. 1920 – d. 1976)	6 October 1962	25 October 1966	4 years, 19 days	Sangkum
	Norodom Ranariddh នរោត្តម រណឫទ្ធិ (b. 1944 – d. 2021)	2 July 1993	6 August 1997	4 years, 35 days	FUNCINPEC
