= Samdech Euv High School =

High schools in Cambodia

- វិទ្យាល័យសម្ដេចឪ
- Cambodia

Information
- School type: Public secondary school
- Grades: 7–12
- Gender: Mixed
- Language: Khmer

Samdech Euv High School (Khmer: វិទ្យាល័យសម្ដេចឪ) is the name of five different high school's campuses in Cambodia.

Norodom Sihanouk was affectionately known as "Samdech Euv" to most Cambodians. (Samdech Euv is a Khmer title which translates as "King Father" in English.)

== Schools ==
- Samdech Euv High School is next to Phumĭ Thnál and is located in Khétt Siĕm Réab.
- Samdech Euv High School is located in Sangkat Bei, Krong Preah Sihanouk.
- Samdech Euv High School is located in Svay Por commune in Battambang province in western Cambodia.
- Samdech Euv High School is located in Banteay Meanchey province. It is situated on the hill of Phnum Svay Mountain along National Road 6 from Siem Reap Province to Poipet. The school was founded in 1956 by Preah Bat Norodom Sihanu Varaman. It is the largest school in the province.
- Samdech Euv Secondary School is located in Village 2, Sangkat 3 of Preah Sihanouk town of the Preah Sihanouk province. It was built by the D.K. Kim Cambodia Foundation, 2012. Further development was completed in 2015.

== Books ==
- Jeldres, Julio A (2005). Volume 1–Shadows Over Angkor: Memoirs of His Majesty King Norodom Sihanouk of Cambodia. Phnom Penh Cambodia: Monument Books. ISBN 974926486X.
- Narong, Men S. (2007). Who's Who, The Most Influential People in Cambodia. Phnom Penh Cambodia: Media Business Networks. ISBN 978-9995066000.
