= Norodom Sirivudh =

Cambodian politician

His Royal Highness Samdech Norodom Sirivudh
- នរោត្ដម សិរីវុឌ្ឍ
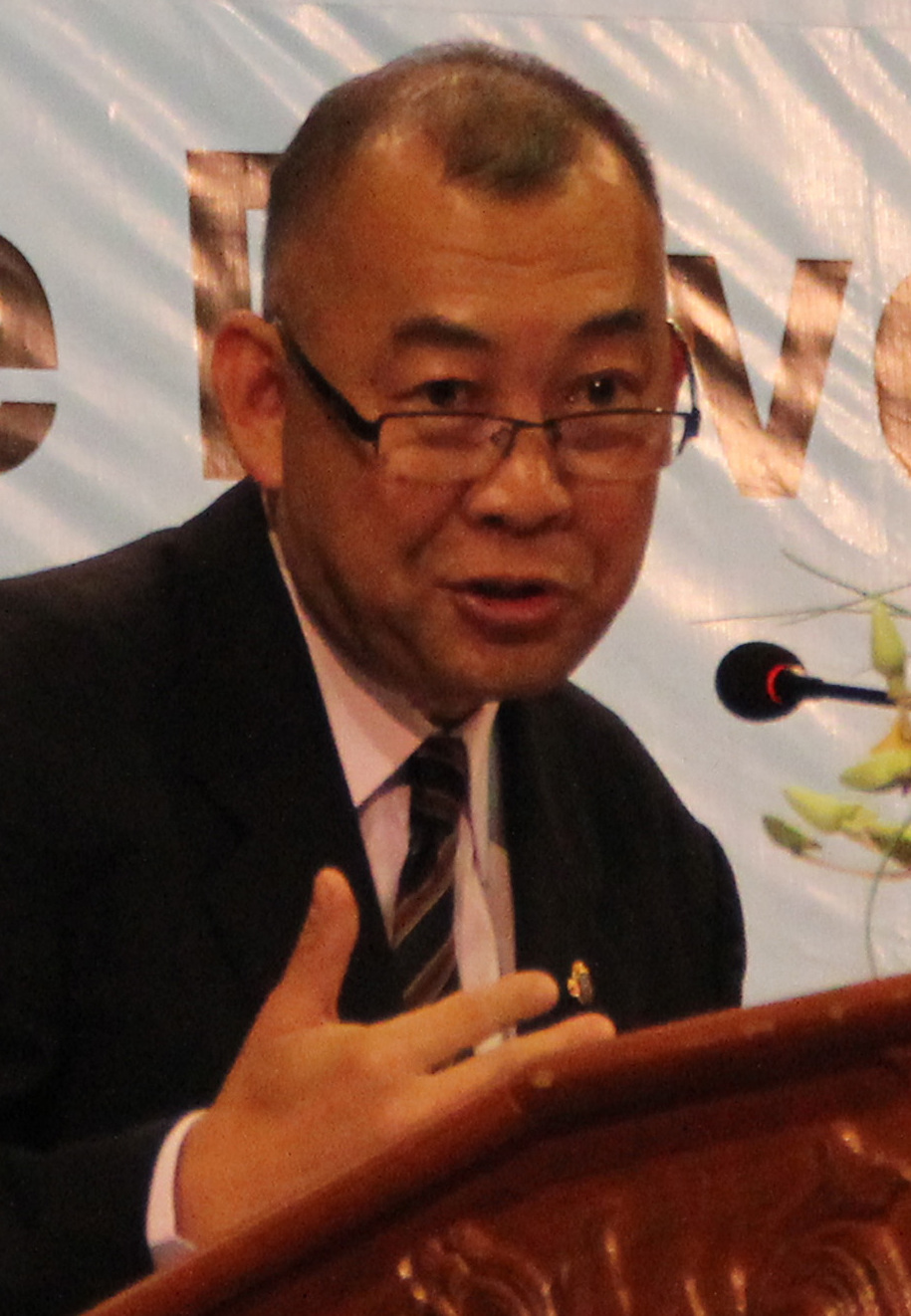
- Sirivudh in 2015

Minister of Foreign Affairs and International Cooperation
- In office 29 October 1993 – 24 October 1994
- Prime Minister: Hun Sen; Norodom Ranariddh
- Preceded by: Hor Namhong
- Succeeded by: Ung Huot

Minister of Interior
- In office 16 July 2004 – 2 March 2006; Served with Sar Kheng
- Prime Minister: Hun Sen
- Preceded by: You Hockry
- Succeeded by: Sar Kheng (outright minister)

Deputy Prime Minister of Cambodia
- In office 16 July 2004 – 21 March 2006
- Prime Minister: Hun Sen

Personal details
- Born: 8 June 1951 (age 75) Phnom Penh, Cambodia, French Indochina
- Party: FUNCINPEC
- Parent(s): Norodom Suramarit; Yeap Kim An
- Education: Paris Dauphine University
- House: Norodom

Norodom Sirivudh (Khmer: នរោត្តម សិរីវុឌ្ឍ; born 8 June 1951) is a Cambodian royal politician who served as a Minister of Foreign Affairs from 1993 to 1994. A member of the royalist FUNCINPEC, he also served as Deputy Prime Minister from 2004 to 2006, and, concurrently, co-Minister of Interior with Sar Kheng. He is the son of King Norodom Suramarit, and a half-brother of King Father Norodom Sihanouk. He was also featured in John Pirozzi's film Don't Think I've Forgotten.

== Honours ==
- Friendship Order (Vietnam, 2005)
- Grand Cordon of the Order of the Rising Sun (Japan, 2019)
