= Norodom Yuvaneath =

Prince of Cambodia (1943–2021)

- Prince of Cambodia
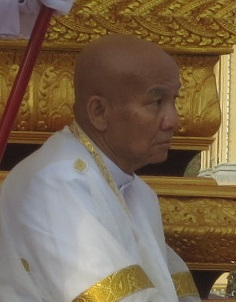
- Born: 17 October 1943; Phnom Penh, Cambodia, French Indochina
- Died: 13 January 2021 (aged 77); Branford, Connecticut, U.S.
- Spouse: Prep Mau (m. 1959; div. 1962) Tea Kim Yin (m. 1962)
- Issue: Norodom Chhavann-rangsi; Norodom Yuveakduri; Norodom Veakchearavouth; Norodom Ekcharin; Norodom Pekina; Norodom Yuveakdevi
- House: Norodom
- Father: Norodom Sihanouk
- Mother: Sisowath Pongsanmoni

Prince Norodom Yuvaneath (Khmer: នរោត្តម យុវនាថ, 17 October 1943 – 13 January 2021) was the first son of the late king of Cambodia, Norodom Sihanouk and Princess Sisowath Pongsanmoni. He was the half-brother of the current king, Norodom Sihamoni.

== Early life and education ==
Prince Norodom Yuvaneath was born on 17 October 1943 at the Royal Palace of Cambodia, Phnom Penh as the eldest son and second child of Norodom Sihanouk and Sisowath Pongsanmoni. At the time, Cambodia was under Japanese occupation whilst his father had previously been crowned on 3 May 1941. Prince Yuvaneath attended Sisowath High School in Phnom Penh where he learnt to speak French and English along with his native Khmer.

== Exile from Cambodia ==
At age 27, he joined his father in going into exile in China following a coup which abolished the monarchy and established the Khmer Republic. They would reside together in Beijing until Yuvaneath moved with his wife Tea Kim Yin to go live in Hong Kong. He again moved with his family to Connecticut in the United States where he was employed with the US Surgical Corporation. (Note: Yuvaneath had four children with Tea Kim Yin: Prince Norodom Veakchiravouth (born 10/01/1966, married 2001); Prince Norodom Ekcharin (born 1969); he was assumed to have died in 1976 during the Khmer Rouge government. There had been an impersonator from Sweden who claimed to be late Ekcharin. But a DNA test concluded that he is not the biological son of Tea Kim Yin.; Princess Norodom Pekina (born 07/07/1970); Princess Norodom Yuveakdevi (born 06/09/1974)]])

== Return to Cambodia ==
In 1993, after the Vietnamese left Cambodia, King Norodom Sihanouk returned to Cambodia and re-established the monarchy. On 31 December of that year, he elevated Prince Yuvaneath to the rank of Sdech Krom Luon, appointing him privy counsellor to His Majesty the King, a rank equal to that of deputy prime minister. After King Sihanouk abdicated, the new king Norodom Sihamoni, Yuvaneath's younger half-brother, appointed Yuvaneath the supreme royal advisor. In this capacity, Yuvaneath proclaimed his opposition to the tribunal of former Khmer Rouge leaders, believing that the 1975-1979 turmoil resulting in the massacre of over two million Cambodians was a result of foreign intervention by the Vietnamese and Thai governments. Yuvaneath also stated his belief that a trial would be contrary to the interests of national reconciliation. (Note: Despite Yuvaneath's opposition to the tribunal, neither the king nor Sihanouk had made any public statements about trials.) Yuvaneath was also a Commander of the Royal Order of Monisaraphon.

== Personal life ==
Norodom Yuvaneath married Tea Kim Yin in June 1962. His son Prince Norodom Ekcharin had died as a child in 1976 during the Khmer Rouge regime.

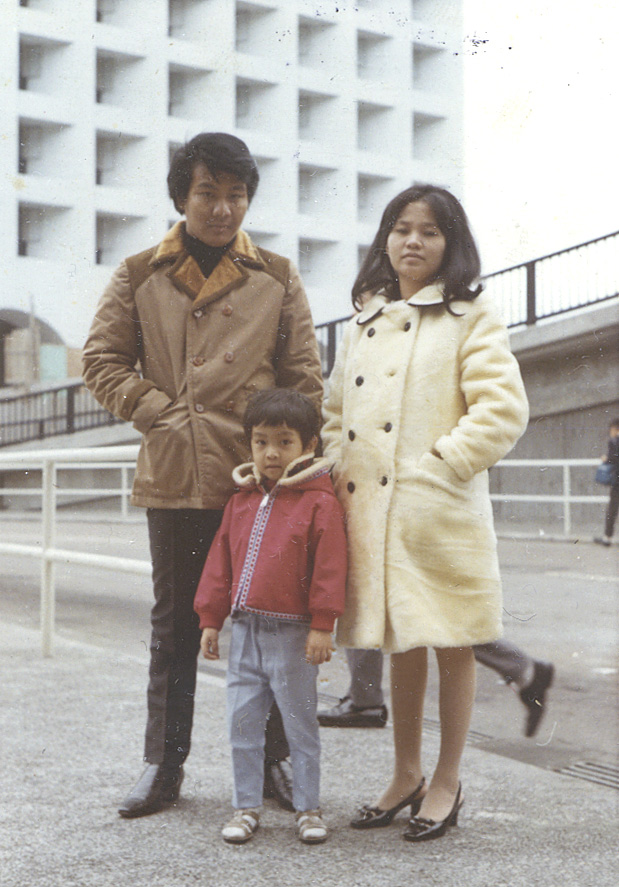
Yuvaneath, Veakchiravouth & Yin, in Hong Kong, 1969/1970. The infant prince, Ekcharin, had been left in Phnom Penh.

== Death ==
Yuvaneath died of illness at Branford, Connecticut, United States on 13 January 2021. He was 77 years old when he died.
