= Norodom Vichara =

Cambodian princess

Her Royal Highness Norodom Vichara
- នរោត្ដម វជ្ជរ៉ា

Member of Parliament
- In office 25 November 1998 – 27 July 2008
- Constituency: Siem Reap (1998–2003); Phnom Penh (2003–08)

Personal details
- Born: 17 August 1946 Phnom Penh, Cambodia, French Indochina
- Died: 28 July 2013 (aged 66) Paris, France
- Party: FUNCINPEC
- Spouses: Tep Sombana (m. 1966, divorced) Yves Dumont (m. 1983; died 2013)
- Parent(s): Norodom Suramarit; Yeap Kim An
- House: Norodom

Norodom Vichara (Khmer: នរោត្តម វជ្ជរ៉ា; 17 August 1946 – 28 July 2013) was a Cambodian princess and politician. She was a daughter of King Norodom Suramarit and a half-sister of King Norodom Sihanouk. She belonged to FUNCINPEC and was elected to represent Phnom Penh Municipality in the National Assembly of Cambodia in 2003. According to a family relative, Vichara died of lung cancer on 28 July 2013, at the age of 66, after a long illness.
