= AAKC =

AAKC may refer to:

- All-Africa Korfball Championship, sport competition, Africa
- Association d'amitié khmero-chinoise (Khmer–Chinese Friendship Association)
