= Khmer–Chinese Friendship Association =

Organization in Cambodia seeking to strengthen relations with China (1964–1967)

- សមាគមមិត្តភាពខ្មែរ-ចិន; Association d'amitié khmero-chinoise
- Abbreviation: AAKC
- Formation: September 1964
- Dissolved: September 1, 1967
- Purpose: Promotion of ties between Cambodia and China
- Headquarters: Cambodia
- President: Leng Ngeth

The Khmer–Chinese Friendship Association (Khmer: សមាគមមិត្តភាពខ្មែរ-ចិន; French: Association d'amitié khmero-chinoise, AAKC) was an organization in Cambodia, seeking to promote ties between Cambodia and China.

== History ==
The association was founded in September 1964. At the time Cambodia and the People's Republic of China enjoyed good bilateral relations. Different political tendencies were represented in the association. As the Chinese Cultural Revolution progressed, the AAKC became increasingly vocally Maoist.

Prince Sihanouk banned the association on September 1, 1967 (all other national friendship associations in Cambodia were also banned). Several key functionaries of AAKC were arrested, including Phouk Chhay. He was released after the 1970 coup d'état. A new Cambodia–China friendship organization was founded immediately after the disbanding of AAKC, the National Committee for Khmer–Chinese Friendship. The new organization lacked any left-wing leaders. The China–Khmer Friendship Association protested against the prohibition of AAKC in Cambodia.

The group that had been active in the AAKC continued to exist as a pro-Chinese faction inside the Communist Party of Kampuchea. The pro-Chinese faction was mainly influential in the south-western region until 1975, when they were subdued by the Pol Pot group. The pro-Chinese faction was purged in 1977, and its main leaders were executed.

== Organization ==
Leng Ngeth was the president of the association. Phouk Chhay was the general secretary of AAKC. Hu Nim served as its vice president. Other leading members of the association included Hou Yuon and Tiv Ol. Khieu Samphan was a member of the press and periodicals sub-committee of AAKC. The association had a sister association based in Peking, the China–Khmer Friendship Association.
