= Tiv =

Tiv or TIV may refer to:

- Tendency for Interpersonal Victimhood, a recently proposed personality disorder
- Tiv people, an ethnic nation in West Africa
- Tiv language, a Southern Bantoid language
- Time-invariant system
- Tornado Intercept Vehicle
- Trivalent influenza vaccine
- Turbine installation vessel
- T-IV mine, a Soviet anti-tank mine
- Fokker T.IV, a Dutch torpedo bomber/maritime reconnaissance floatplane
- Tivat Airport, by IATA airport code
- Trend-indicator value, a measure of major conventional weapons delivery volume, developed by Stockholm International Peace Research Institute (SIPRI)

== People with the name ==
- Tiv (ancestor), traditional progenitor of the Tiv people
- Tiv (illustrator), a female South Korean illustrator who currently lives in Japan.
- Tiv Ol, Cambodian teacher and communist politician
