= Tiv Ol =

Cambodian politician

- ទីវ អុល
- Died: 1977; Democratic Kampuchea
- Spouse: Leng Simhak

Tiv Ol (Khmer: ទីវ អុល) was a Cambodian teacher and communist politician. Ol joined the Kampuchean People's Revolutionary Party (which later evolved into the Workers' Party of Kampuchea/Communist Party of Kampuchea) in autumn 1959.

Ol was the leading figure in a grouping of radical teachers in Phnom Penh. On 8 March 1963, Tiv Ol was included in the list of 34 'subversive' leftists, published by then-Prince Sihanouk. During the period of 1965–1967, Tiv Ol was also a prominent member of the Khmer-Chinese Friendship Association.

In 1967, the Tiv Ol-led group of leftist teachers began to shift to the countryside, to escape state repression. Tiv Ol himself left the capital in November 1967, and made his way to the clandestine CPK Party Centre. Vorn Vet later claimed to have been the organizer of this exodus.

Around 1970, Tiv Ol was appointed the chief of the CPK party organization in Kratie. After communist forces took control of the area, Tiv Ol organized the re-opening of the local school and hospital as well as initiating some agrarian reforms.

Tiv Ol, like others in the CPK Eastern Zone, represented a sector within the party which held ambivalent views on the relation between Vietnamese and Cambodian communists. In 1973 Tiv Ol expressed that Vietnam was an ally of the Cambodian liberation, but an unreliable ally. In 1974 Tiv Ol visited Hanoi. During his stay in Hanoi, he wrote a poem saluting Indochinese unity. The poem was published in a Vietnamese magazine. It is said that the publication had angered Pol Pot.

In 1977 Tiv Ol fell victim to a purge of the core of the Khmer-Chinese Friendship Association. He was arrested on 6 June, and later executed.

== Personal life ==
Tiv Ol was married to Leng Sim Hak, a fellow teacher.
