= San Yun =

16th Prime Minister of Cambodia

- សាន យន់

Prime Minister of Cambodia
- In office 25 October 1956 – 9 April 1957
- Monarch: Norodom Suramarit
- Preceded by: Norodom Sihanouk
- Succeeded by: Norodom Sihanouk

Personal details
- Born: 15 June 1905 Pursat, Cambodia, French Indochina
- Died: 3 March 1974 (aged 68)
- Party: Sangkum

San Yun (Khmer: សាន យន់; 1905 – 1974) was the prime minister of Cambodia from 1956 to 1957. He was Minister of Finance in 1957.
