= 1955 Cambodian Geneva Conference referendum =

- 7 February 1955

Results
Choice	Votes	%
Yes	925,667	99.80%
No	1,834	0.20%
Valid votes	927,501	100.00%
Invalid or blank votes	0	0.00%
Total votes	927,501	100.00%

A referendum on the initiatives of King Norodom Sihanouk at the Geneva Conference was held in Cambodia on 7 February 1955. It was approved by 99.8% of voters.

== Results ==
Choice	Votes	%
For	925,667	99.8
Against	1,834	0.2
Invalid/blank votes		–
Total	927,501	100
Source: Nohlen et al.
