= David P. Chandler =

American historian and academic

David Chandler
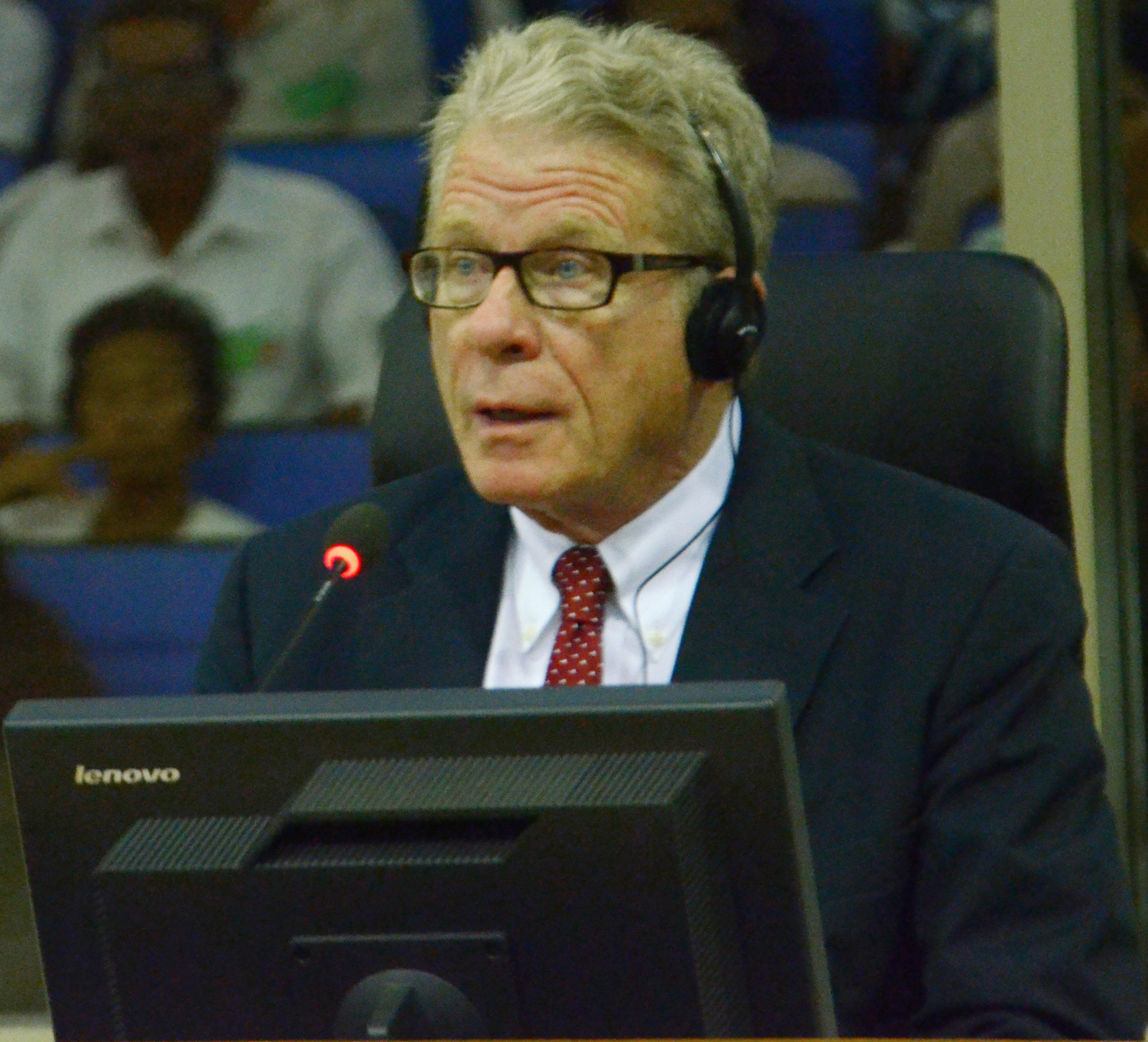
- Professor David Chandler gives expert testimony in 2012
- Born: 1933 (age 92–93); New York City, U.S.

Academic background
- Education: Harvard College; Yale University; University of Michigan

Academic work
- Institutions: Monash University, Georgetown University
- Main interests: Cambodia modern history

David Porter Chandler (born 1933) is an American historian and academic who is regarded as one of the foremost western scholars of Cambodia's modern history. Chandler currently resides in Australia, where he is an emeritus professor at Monash University as well as an adjunct professor of Asian Studies at Georgetown University.

== Biography ==
=== Early life ===
Chandler was born in the United States in 1933 in New York City. He has earned degrees from Harvard College; Yale University; and the University of Michigan, where he wrote his dissertation on pre-colonial Cambodia.

=== Career ===
Chandler was a United States Foreign Service officer from 1958–66, serving in Phnom Penh (1960–62), Bogotá, Santiago de Cali, and Washington, D.C. He has held professorial positions at Monash University, University of Wisconsin–Madison, Johns Hopkins University, and Cornell University. He has been a Senior Advisor at the Center for Khmer Studies in Siem Reap; a USAID consultant evaluating Cambodia's democracy and governance programs; an Asia Foundation consultant assessing Phnom Penh election activities. He has also accompanied Amnesty International and the Office of the United Nations High Commissioner for Refugees on Cambodian research and fact finding missions, and has been a researcher in Cambodia archives for the U.S. Department of Defense Office of POW/MIA Affairs.

==== Recognition ====
A room in the U.S. Embassy in Phnom Penh is named in his honor. In 1994 he was elected a Fellow of the Australian Academy of the Humanities.

== Bibliography ==
- A History of Cambodia. Westview Press, 1983.
- The Tragedy of Cambodian History: Politics, War and Revolution since 1945. Yale University Press, 1991.
- Brother Number One. A Political Biography Of Pol Pot. Westview Press, 1992.
- Facing the Cambodian Past: Selected Essays, 1971–1994. Silkworm Books, 1996.
- Voices from S-21: Terror and History in Pol Pot's Secret Prison. University of California Press, 1999.
