= Norodom Sihanouk =

King of Cambodia (1941–1955; 1993–2004)

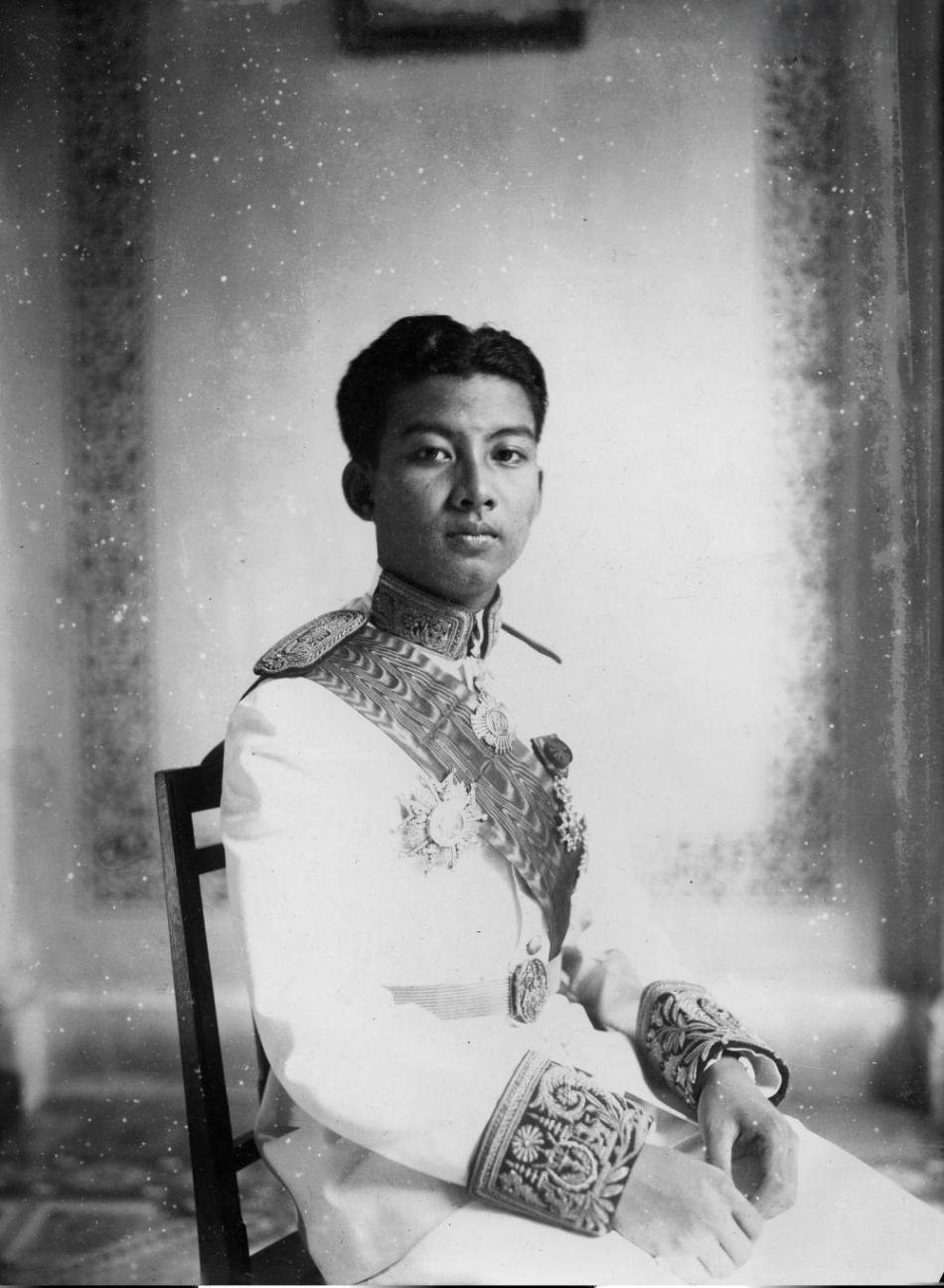
- Formal portrait, c. 1941

King of Cambodia
- First reign: 24 April 1941 – 2 March 1955
- Coronation: 3 May 1941
- Predecessor: Sisowath Monivong
- Successor: Norodom Suramarit
- Prime ministers: See list: Himself; Son Ngoc Thanh; Sisowath Monireth; Sisowath Youtevong; Sisowath Watchayavong; Chhean Vam; Penn Nouth; Yem Sambaur; Ieu Koeus; Sisowath Monipong; Oum Chheang Sun; Huy Kanthoul; Chan Nak; Leng Ngeth
- Second reign: 24 September 1993 – 7 October 2004
- Predecessor: Monarchy restored; Himself as Chief of State
- Successor: Norodom Sihamoni
- Prime ministers: See list: Norodom Ranariddh; Hun Sen; Ung Huot

Chief of State of Cambodia
- In office 20 June 1960 – 18 March 1970
- Queen: Sisowath Kossamak
- Preceded by: Chuop Hell (acting)
- Succeeded by: Cheng Heng (acting)
- In office 14 June 1993 – 24 September 1993
- Preceded by: Chea Sim as President of the Council of State
- Succeeded by: Himself as King

President of the State Presidium
- In office 25 April 1975 – 5 April 1976
- Prime Minister: Penn Nouth
- Preceded by: Sak Sutsakhan (as Chairman of the Supreme Committee)
- Succeeded by: Khieu Samphan (as Chairman of the State Presidium)
- Born: 31 October 1922; Phnom Penh, Cambodia
- Died: 15 October 2012 (aged 89); Beijing, China
- Burial: 13 July 2014; Silver Pagoda, Royal Palace of Cambodia (interment of ashes)
- Spouse: See list: Phat Kanhol (m. 1942; div. 1946); Sisowath Pongsanmoni (m. 1942; div. 1951); Sisowath Monikessan (m. 1944; died 1946); Mam Manivan Phanivong (m. 1949; div. 1955); Norodom Thavet Norleak (m. 1955; div. 1968); Norodom Monineath (m. 1955)
- Issue Detail: See list: Princess Buppha Devi; Prince Yuvaneath; Prince Ranariddh; Prince Ravivong; Prince Chakrapong; Prince Naradipo; Princess Sorya Roeungsi; Princess Kantha Bopha; Prince Khemanourak; Princess Botum Bopha; Princess Sujata; King Norodom Sihamoni; Prince Narindrapong; Princess Arunrasmy
- House: Norodom
- Father: Norodom Suramarit
- Mother: Sisowath Kossamak
- Religion: Theravada Buddhism
- Education: École de cavalerie, Saumur
- Occupations: Composer; film director; politician
- Political party: Independent (1945–1955, 1970–1981, 1991–2012); Sangkum (1955–1970); FUNCINPEC (1981–1991)
- Website: www.norodomsihanouk.info
Other offices
President of the Council of Kingdom
In office October 1955 – January 1956
Monarch	Norodom Suramarit
Preceded by	Penn Nouth
Succeeded by	Sim Var
Prime Minister of Cambodia
In office 17 November 1961 – 13 February 1962
Monarch	Sisowath Kossamak
President	Himself as Chief of State
Preceded by	Penn Nouth
Succeeded by	Nhiek Tioulong (acting)
In office 10 July 1958 – 19 April 1960
Monarch	Norodom Suramarit
Preceded by	Sim Var
Succeeded by	Pho Proeung
In office 9 April 1957 – 7 July 1957
Monarch	Norodom Suramarit
Preceded by	San Yun
Succeeded by	Sim Var
In office 15 September 1956 – 15 October 1956
Monarch	Norodom Suramarit
Preceded by	Khim Tit
Succeeded by	San Yun
In office 1 March 1956 – 24 March 1956
Monarch	Norodom Suramarit
Preceded by	Oum Chheang Sun
Succeeded by	Khim Tit
In office 3 October 1955 – 5 January 1956
Monarch	Norodom Suramarit
Preceded by	Leng Ngeth
Succeeded by	Oum Chheang Sun
In office 7 April 1954 – 18 April 1954
Monarch	Himself
Preceded by	Chan Nak
Succeeded by	Penn Nouth
In office 16 June 1952 – 24 January 1953
Monarch	Himself
Preceded by	Huy Kanthoul
Succeeded by	Penn Nouth
In office 28 April 1950 – 30 May 1950
Monarch	Himself
Preceded by	Yem Sambaur
Succeeded by	Sisowath Monipong
In office 18 March 1945 – 13 August 1945
Monarch	Himself
Preceded by	Position established
Succeeded by	Son Ngoc Thanh

Modern kings of Cambodia
- Ang Duong
- Norodom
- Sisowath
- Sisowath Monivong
- Norodom Sihanouk (first reign)
- Norodom Suramarit
- Sisowath Kossamak (ceremonial queen)
- Norodom Sihanouk (second reign)
- Norodom Sihamoni

Norodom Sihanouk (Note: In this Cambodian name, the surname is Norodom. In accordance with Cambodian custom, this person should be referred to by the given name, Sihanouk.) (Note: Khmer: នរោត្តម សីហនុ, UNGEGN: Nôrotdâm Seihănŭ, ALA-LC: Narottam Sīhanu [nɔ.roː.ɗɑm səj.haʔ.nuʔ]) (/ˈsiː.ənʊk/; 31 October 1922 – 15 October 2012) was King, Chief of State and Prime Minister of Cambodia. He is known as Samdech Euv (Note: Khmer: សម្ដេចឪ, UNGEGN: Sǎmdăch Oĕu, ALA-LC: Samṭec Ýu [sɑmɗac ʔɨw]) (meaning "King Father") or by his nickname The Pink Prince. During his lifetime, Cambodia was under various regimes, from French colonial rule (until 1953), a Japanese puppet state (1945), an independent kingdom (1953–1970), a military republic (1970–1975), the Khmer Rouge regime (1975–1979), a Vietnamese-backed communist regime (1979–1989), a transitional communist regime (1989–1993) to eventually another kingdom (since 1993).

Sihanouk was the only child of Prince Norodom Suramarit and Princess Sisowath Kossamak, daughter of King Sisowath Monivong. When his grandfather Monivong died in 1941, Sihanouk became king amidst French colonial rule. After the Japanese occupation of Cambodia during World War II, he secured Cambodian independence from France in 1953. He abdicated in 1955 and was succeeded by his father, Suramarit, so as to directly participate in politics. Sihanouk's political party, Sangkum, won the general elections that year, and he became prime minister of Cambodia. He governed the country under one-party rule and suppressed political dissent. After his father died in 1960, Sihanouk assumed a new position as Chief of State of Cambodia.

Officially neutral in foreign relations, Sihanouk was closer to the communist bloc in practice. The 1970 Cambodian coup d'état ousted him, and he fled to China and North Korea, forming a government-in-exile and a resistance movement there. He encouraged Cambodians to fight the new government and backed the Khmer Rouge during the Cambodian Civil War. He returned as figurehead head of state after the Khmer Rouge's victory in 1975. His relations with the new Khmer Rouge government soured, and in 1976 he resigned. He was placed under house arrest until Vietnamese forces overthrew the Khmer Rouge in 1979.

Sihanouk went into exile again and in 1981 formed FUNCINPEC, a monarchist resistance party. The following year, he became president of the Coalition Government of Democratic Kampuchea (CGDK), a broad coalition of anti-Vietnamese resistance factions which retained Cambodia's seat at the United Nations, making him Cambodia's internationally recognized head of state. In the late 1980s, informal talks were carried out to end hostilities between the Vietnam-supported People's Republic of Kampuchea and the CGDK. In 1990, the Supreme National Council of Cambodia was formed as a transitional body to oversee Cambodia's sovereign matters, with Sihanouk as its president. The 1991 Paris Peace Accords were signed, and the UN Transitional Authority in Cambodia (UNTAC) was established the following year. The UNTAC organized the general elections in 1993, and a coalition government, jointly led by his son Norodom Ranariddh and Hun Sen, was subsequently formed. Sihanouk was reinstated as Cambodia's king. He abdicated again in 2004, and the Royal Council of the Throne chose his son Norodom Sihamoni as his successor. Sihanouk died in Beijing in 2012.

Between 1941 and 2006, Sihanouk produced and directed 50 films, some of which he acted in. The films, later described as being of low quality, often featured nationalistic elements, as did a number of the songs he wrote. Some of his songs were about his wife Monique, the nations neighboring Cambodia, and the communist leaders who supported him in his exile. In the 1980s, Sihanouk held concerts for diplomats in New York City. He also participated in concerts at his palace during his second reign. Sihanouk is remembered for his role in shaping modern Cambodia, particularly in leading the country to independence, although his reputation was damaged by his association with the Khmer Rouge in the 1970s.

== Early life and first reign ==
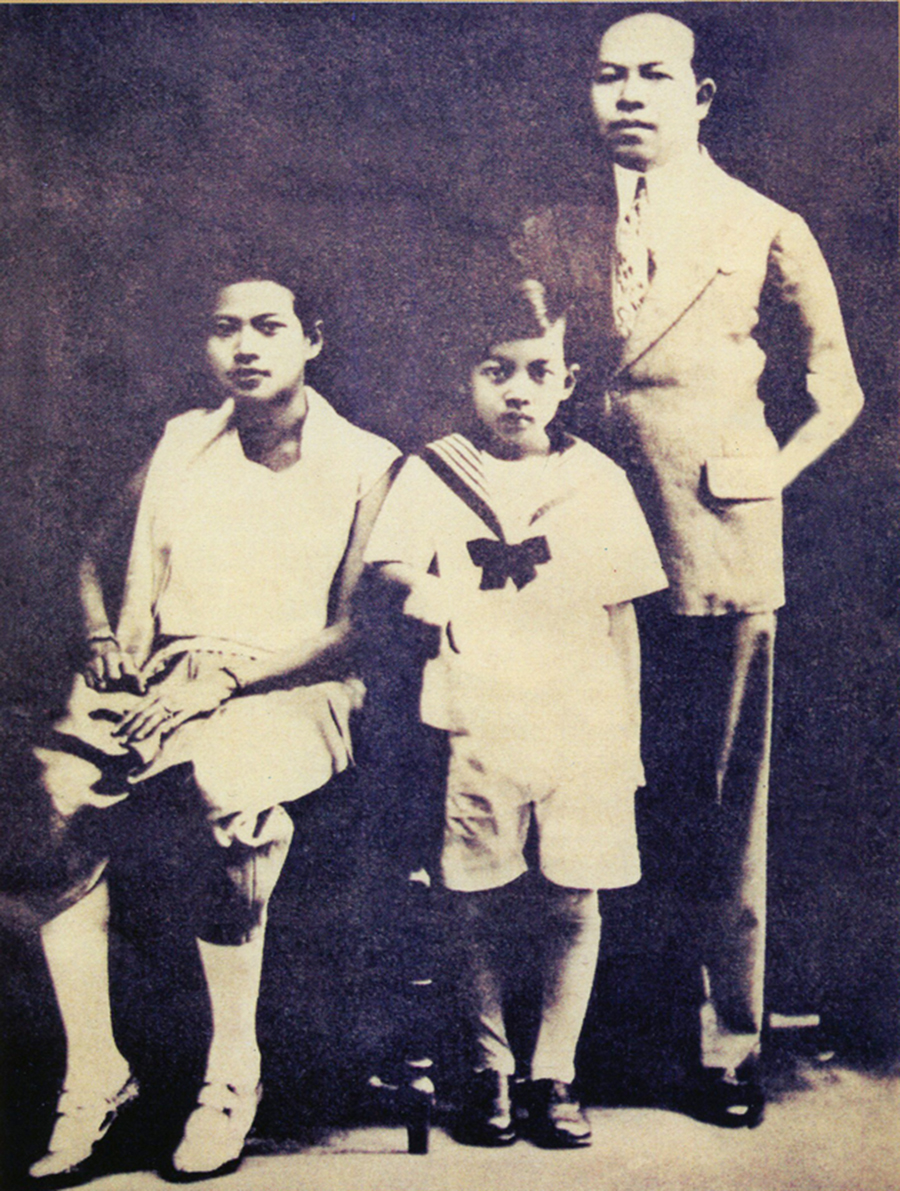
Family photo of Norodom Suramarit, Sisowath Kossamak, and Norodom Sihanouk, c. 1920s

Norodom Sihanouk was the only child born of the union between Norodom Suramarit and Sisowath Kossamak. His parents, who heeded the Royal Court Astrologer's advice that he risked dying at a young age if he was raised under parental care, placed him under the care of Kossamak's grandmother, Pat. When Pat died, Kossamak brought Sihanouk to live with his paternal grandfather, Norodom Sutharot. Sutharot delegated parenting responsibilities to his daughter, Norodom Ket Kanyamom.

Sihanouk received his primary education at the François Baudoin school and Nuon Moniram school in Phnom Penh. During this time, he received financial support from his maternal grandfather, Sisowath Monivong, to head an amateur performance troupe and football team. In 1936, Sihanouk was sent to Saigon, where he pursued his secondary education at Lycée Chasseloup Laubat, a boarding school.

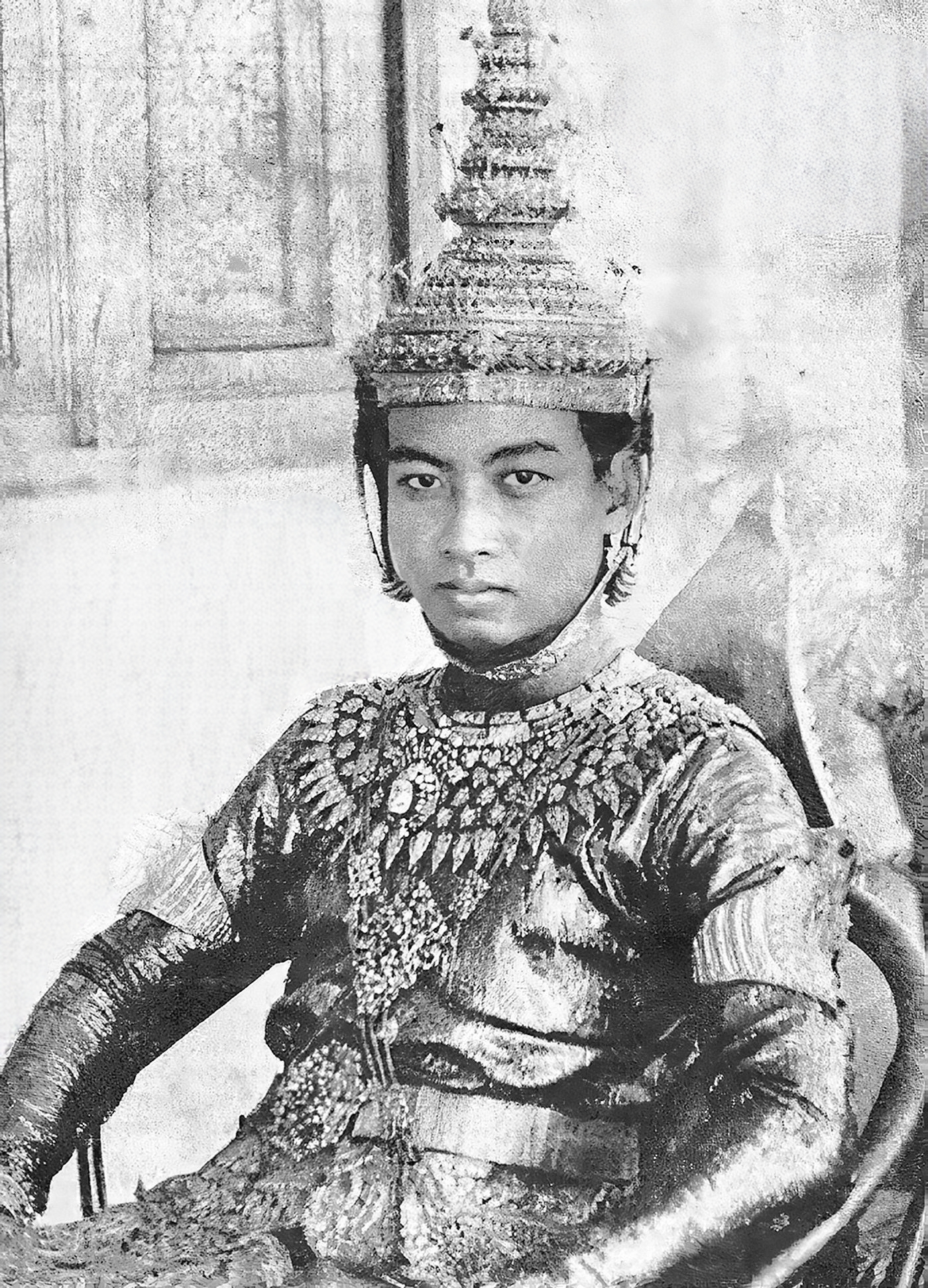
Sihanouk in his coronation regalia, November 1941

When king Monivong died on 23 April 1941 the Governor-General of French Indochina, Jean Decoux, chose Sihanouk to succeed him. Sihanouk's appointment as king was formalised the following day by the Cambodian Crown Council, and his coronation ceremony took place on 3 May 1941. During the Japanese occupation of Cambodia, he dedicated most of his time to sports, filming, and the occasional tour to the countryside. In March 1945 the Japanese military, which had occupied Cambodia since August 1941, dissolved the nominal French colonial administration. Under pressure from the Japanese, Sihanouk proclaimed Cambodia's independence and assumed the position of prime minister while serving as king at the same time.

=== Pre-independence and self-rule ===
As prime minister, Sihanouk revoked a decree issued by the last resident superior of Cambodia, Georges Gautier, to romanize the Khmer script. Following the surrender of Japan in August 1945, nationalist forces loyal to Son Ngoc Thanh launched a coup, which led to Thanh becoming prime minister. When the French returned to Cambodia in October 1945, Thanh was dismissed and replaced by Sihanouk's uncle Sisowath Monireth. Monireth negotiated for greater autonomy in managing Cambodia's internal affairs. A modus vivendi signed in January 1946 granted Cambodia autonomy within the French Union.

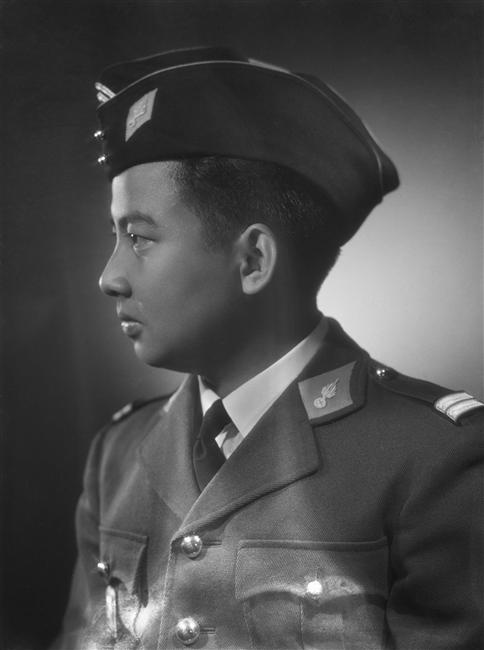
Sihanouk in 1946

A joint French-Cambodian commission was set up after that to draft Cambodia's constitution, and in April 1946 Sihanouk introduced clauses which provided for an elected parliament on the basis of universal male suffrage as well as press freedom. The first constitution was signed into effect by Sihanouk in May 1947. Around this time, Sihanouk made two trips to Saumur, France, where he attended military training at the Armoured Cavalry Branch Training School in 1946, and again in 1948. He was made a reserve captain in the French army.

In early 1949, Sihanouk traveled to Paris with his parents to negotiate with the French government for more autonomy for Cambodia. The modus vivendi was replaced by a new Franco-Khmer treaty, which recognised Cambodia as "independent" within the French Union. In practice, the treaty granted only limited self-rule to Cambodia. While Cambodia was given free rein in managing its foreign ministry and, to a lesser extent, its defence, most of the other ministries remained under French control.

Meanwhile, dissenting legislators from the national assembly attacked the government led by prime minister Penn Nouth over its failure to resolve deepening financial and corruption problems plaguing the country. The dissenting legislators, led by Yem Sambaur, who had defected from the Democratic Party in November 1948, deposed Penn Nouth. Yem Sambaur replaced him, but his appointment did not sit well with the Democrats, who in turn pressured Sihanouk to dissolve the national assembly and hold elections.

Sihanouk, who by now had tired of the political squabbling, dissolved the assembly in September 1949, but opted to rule by decree for the next two years before general elections were held, which the Democrats won. In October 1951, Thanh returned to Cambodia and was received by 100,000 supporters, a spectacle which Sihanouk saw as an affront to his regal authority. Thanh disappeared six months later, presumably to join the Khmer Issarak. Sihanouk ordered the Democrat-led government to arrest Thanh but was ignored.

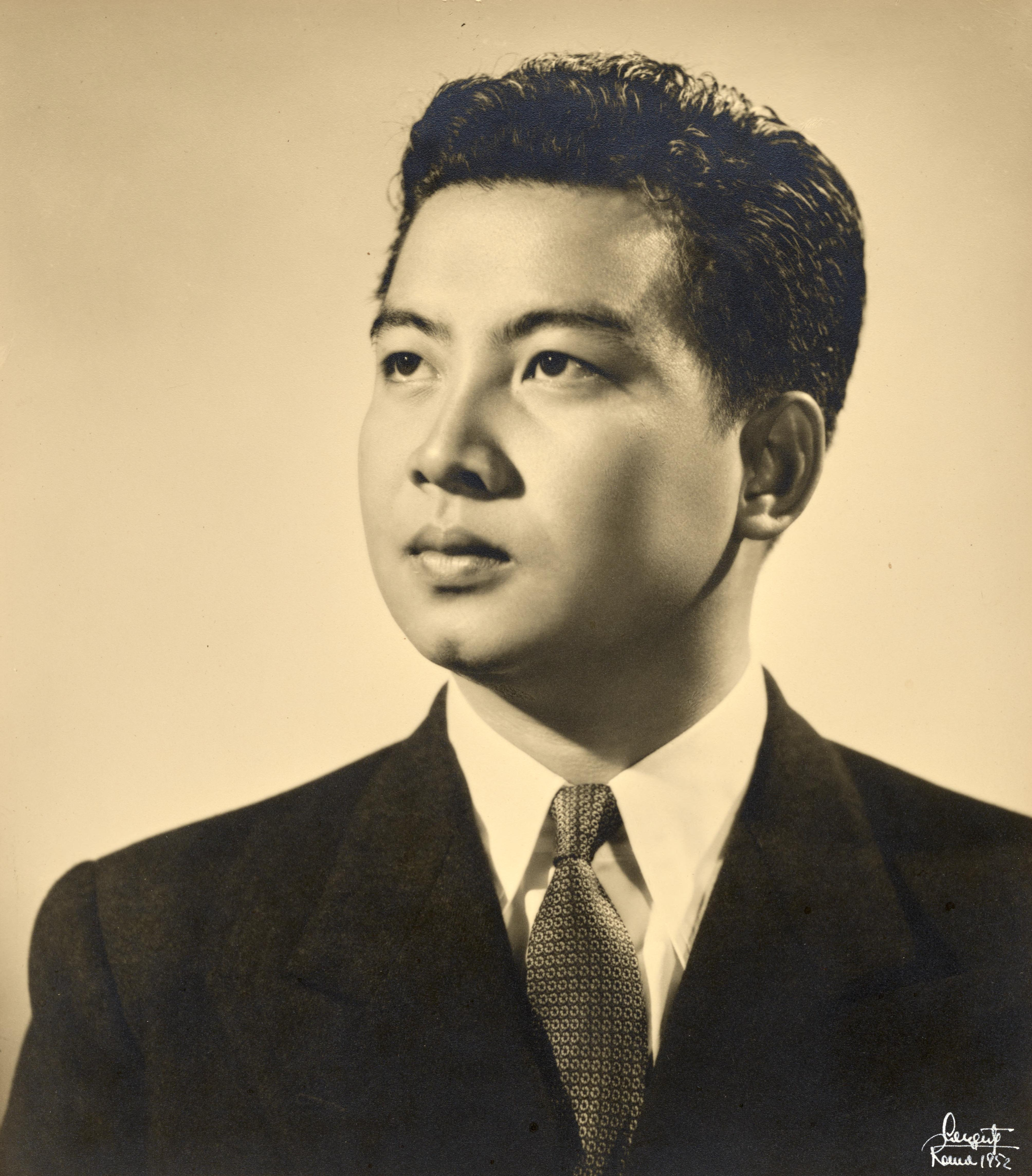
Sihanouk in 1952

Subsequently, civil demonstrations against the monarchy and the French broke out in the countryside, alarming Sihanouk, who began to suspect that the Democrats were complicit. In June 1952 Sihanouk dismissed the Democratic nominee Huy Kanthoul and made himself prime minister. A few days later, Sihanouk privately confided in exasperation to the US chargé d'affaires, Thomas Gardiner Corcoran, that parliamentary democracy was unsuitable for Cambodia.

In January 1953, Sihanouk re-appointed Penn Nouth as prime minister before leaving for France. Once there, Sihanouk wrote to French President Vincent Auriol requesting that he grant Cambodia full independence, citing widespread anti-French sentiment among the Cambodian populace. Auriol deferred Sihanouk's request to the Minister of the Overseas, Jean Letourneau, who promptly rejected it. Subsequently, Sihanouk traveled to Canada and the United States, where he gave radio interviews to present his case.

He took advantage of the prevailing anti-communist sentiment in those countries, arguing that Cambodia faced a Communist threat similar to that of the Viet Minh in Vietnam, and that the solution was to grant full independence to Cambodia. Sihanouk returned to Cambodia in June 1953, taking up residence in Siem Reap. He organised public rallies calling for Cambodians to fight for independence, and formed a citizenry militia which attracted about 130,000 recruits.

In August 1953, France agreed to cede control over judicial and interior affairs to Cambodia, and in October 1953 the defense ministry as well. At the end of October, Sihanouk went to Phnom Penh, where he declared Cambodia's independence from France on 9 November 1953. In May 1954, Sihanouk sent two of his cabinet ministers, Nhiek Tioulong and Tep Phan, to represent Cambodia at the Geneva Conference. The agreements affirmed Cambodia's independence and allowed it to seek military aid from any country without restrictions.

At the same time, Sihanouk's relations with the governing Democrat party remained strained, as they were wary of his growing political influence. To counter Democrat opposition, Sihanouk held a national referendum to gauge public approval for his efforts to seek national independence. While the results showed 99.8 percent approval, Australian historian Milton Osborne noted that open balloting was carried out and voters were cowed into casting an approval vote under police surveillance.

== Sangkum era ==
=== Abdication and entry into politics ===
On 2 March 1955, Sihanouk suddenly abdicated the throne and was in turn succeeded by his father, Norodom Suramarit. His abdication surprised everyone, including his own parents. In his abdication speech, Sihanouk explained that he was abdicating in order to extricate himself from the "intrigues" of palace life and allow easier access to common folk as an "ordinary citizen". According to Osborne, Sihanouk's abdication earned him the freedom to pursue politics while continuing to enjoy the deference that he had received from his subjects when he was king. He also feared being cast aside by the government after discovering that his popularity was manufactured by his own officials.

In April 1955, before leaving for a summit with Asian and African states in Bandung, Indonesia, Sihanouk announced the formation of his own political party, the Popular Socialist Community (Sangkum), and expressed interest in participating in the general elections slated to be held in September 1955. While the Sangkum was, in effect, a political party, Sihanouk argued that the Sangkum should be seen as a political "organisation", and explained that he could accommodate people with differing political orientations on the sole condition that they pledged fealty to the monarchy. The creation of the Sangkum was seen as a move to dissolve the political parties.

Sangkum was based on four small, monarchist, rightist parties, including the 'Victorious North-East' party of Dap Chhuon, the Khmer Renovation Party party of Lon Nol, the People's Party and the Liberal Party. At the same time, Sihanouk was running out of patience with the increasingly leftist Democratic Party and the left-wing Pracheachon, as both had refused to merge into his party and had campaigned against him. He appointed as director of national security Dap Chhuon, who ordered the national police to jail their leaders and break up their election rallies. When elections were held, the Sangkum received 83 percent of all valid votes. They took up all seats in the National Assembly, replacing the Democrats, which had until then been the majority party. The following month, Sihanouk was appointed as prime minister.

=== Premiership (1955–1960) ===
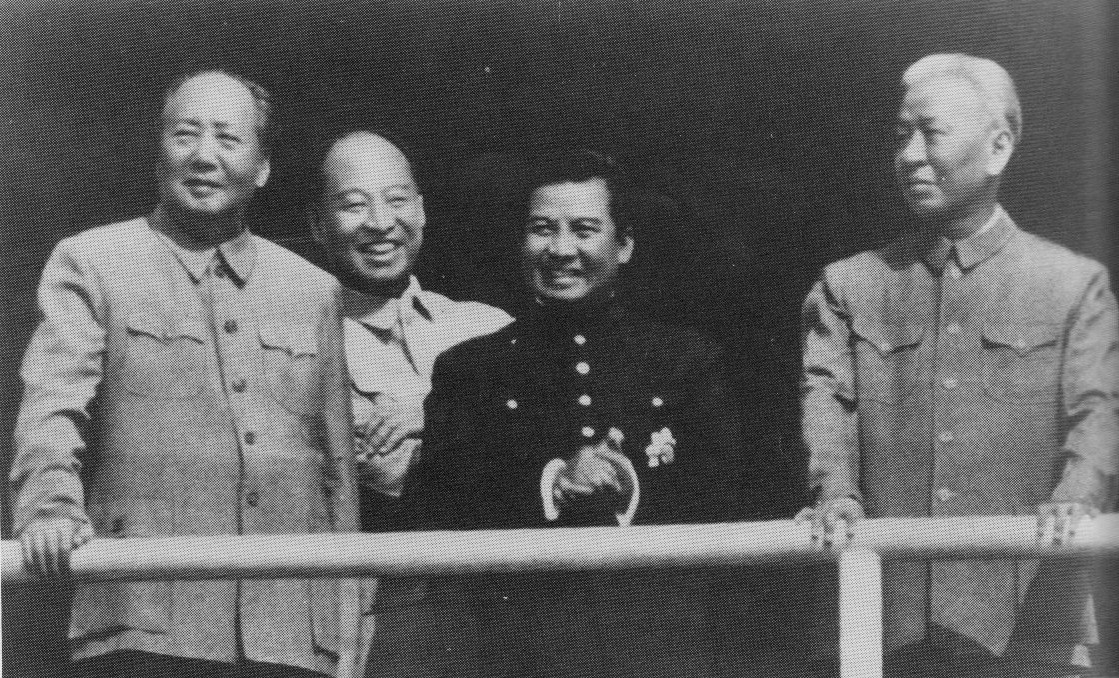
Meeting in Beijing in 1965: (from left) Mao Zedong, Peng Zhen, Sihanouk, Liu Shaoqi

Once in office, Sihanouk introduced several constitutional changes, including extending suffrage to women, adopting Khmer as the sole official language of the country and making Cambodia a constitutional monarchy by vesting policy-making powers in the prime minister rather than the king. He viewed socialism as an ideal concept for establishing social equality and fostering national cohesion within newly independent Cambodia. In March 1956, he embarked on a national programme of "Buddhist socialism", promoting socialist principles on the one hand while maintaining the kingdom's Buddhist culture on the other.

Between 1955 and 1960, Sihanouk resigned and retook the post of prime minister several times, citing fatigue caused by overwork. The National Assembly nominated experienced politicians such as Sim Var and San Yun to become prime minister whenever Sihanouk took leave, but they similarly relinquished their posts each time, several months into their term, as cabinet ministers repeatedly disagreed over public policy matters.

In May 1955, Sihanouk had accepted military aid from the US. The following January, when he was in the Philippines on a state visit, Central Intelligence Agency (CIA) operatives attempted to sway him into placing Cambodia under Southeast Asia Treaty Organization (SEATO) protection. US Secretary of State John Foster Dulles went to great efforts to convince Sihanouk, however he refused because "I considered SEATO an aggressive military alliance directed against neighbors whose ideology I did not share but with whom Cambodia had no quarrel". Subsequently, Sihanouk began to suspect that the US was attempting to undermine his government and that it was lending covert support to the Democratic party, now without parliamentary representation, for that purpose. Sihanouk developed a good impression of China, whose premier, Zhou Enlai, gave him a warm reception on his first visit there in February 1956. They signed a friendship treaty in which China promised US$40 million in economic aid to Cambodia.

When Sihanouk returned from China, Sarit Thanarat and Ngo Dinh Diem, leaders of Thailand and South Vietnam, respectively, both with pro-American sympathies, started to accuse him of pro-Communist sympathies. South Vietnam briefly imposed a trade embargo on Cambodia, preventing trading ships from travelling up the Mekong river to Phnom Penh. While Sihanouk professed that he was pursuing a policy of neutrality, Sarit and Diem remained distrustful of him, more so after he established formal diplomatic relations with China in 1958.

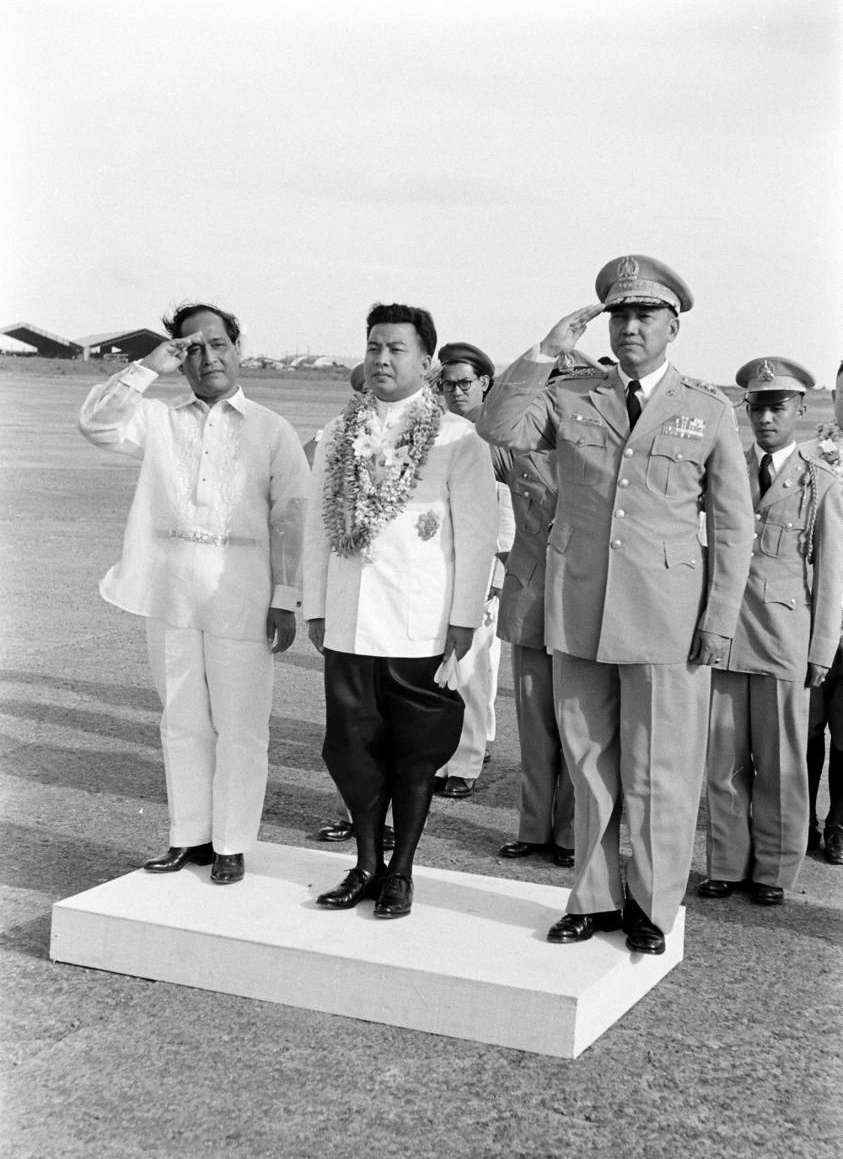
Carlos P. Garcia, the then-Vice President of the Philippines in 1956 with Sihanouk

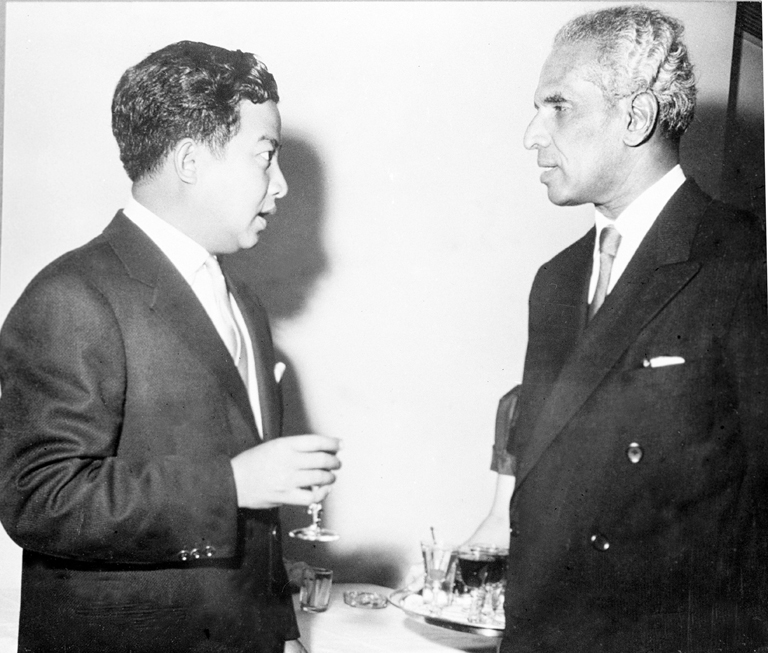
Indian Defence Minister V. K. Krishna Menon is seen pictured with Sihanouk.

The Democratic party continued to criticize the Sangkum and Sihanouk in their newspaper, much to Sihanouk's consternation. In August 1957, Sihanouk finally lost patience, calling out Democrat leaders for a debate. Five of them attended. At the debate, held at the Royal Palace, Sihanouk spoke in a belligerent tone, challenging the Democrat leaders to present evidence of malfeasance in his government and inviting them to join the Sangkum. The Democrat leaders gave hesitant responses, and, according to American historian David P. Chandler, this gave the audience the impression that they were disloyal to the monarchy.

The debate led to the effective demise of the Democratic party, as its leaders were subsequently beaten up by government soldiers, with Sihanouk's tacit approval. With the Democrats vanquished, Sihanouk focused on preparing for general elections, slated to be held in March 1958. He drafted left-wing politicians, including Hou Yuon, Hu Nim and Chau Seng, to stand as Sangkum candidates, with a view to winning left-wing support from the Pracheachon. The Pracheachon on their part fielded five candidates for the elections. However, four of them withdrew, as they were prevented by the national police from holding any election rallies. When voting took place, the Sangkum won all seats in the national assembly.

In December 1958 Ngo Dinh Nhu, Diem's younger brother and chief adviser, broached the idea of orchestrating a coup to overthrow Sihanouk. Nhu contacted Dap Chhuon, Sihanouk's Interior Minister, who was known for his pro-American sympathies, to prepare for the coup against his boss. Chhuon received covert financial and military assistance from Thailand, South Vietnam, and the CIA. In January 1959 Sihanouk learned of the coup plans through intermediaries who were in contact with Chhuon. The following month, Sihanouk sent the army to capture Chhuon, who was summarily executed as soon as he was captured, effectively ending the coup attempt. Sihanouk then accused South Vietnam and the United States of orchestrating the coup attempt.

Six months later, on 31 August 1959, a small packaged lacquer gift fitted with a parcel bomb was delivered to the royal palace. Norodom Vakrivan, the chief of protocol, was killed instantly when he opened the package. Sihanouk's parents, Suramarit and Kossamak, were sitting in another room not far from Vakrivan. An investigation traced the origin of the parcel bomb to an American military base in Saigon. While Sihanouk publicly accused Ngo Dinh Nhu of masterminding the bomb attack, he secretly suspected that the US was also involved. The incident deepened his distrust of the US.

=== Initial years as Head of State (1960–1965) ===
Suramarit, Sihanouk's father, died on 3 April 1960 after several months of poor health that Sihanouk blamed upon the shock that his father had received from the parcel bomb attack. The following day, the Cambodian Crown Council met to choose Monireth as regent. Over the next two months, Sihanouk introduced constitutional amendments to create the new post of Head of State of Cambodia, which provided ceremonial powers equivalent to that of the king. A referendum held on 5 June 1960 approved Sihanouk's proposals, and Sihanouk was formally appointed Head of State on 14 June 1960. As the head of state, Sihanouk took over various ceremonial responsibilities of the king, such as holding public audiences and leading the Royal Ploughing Ceremony. At the same time, he continued to play an active role in politics as Sangkum's leader.

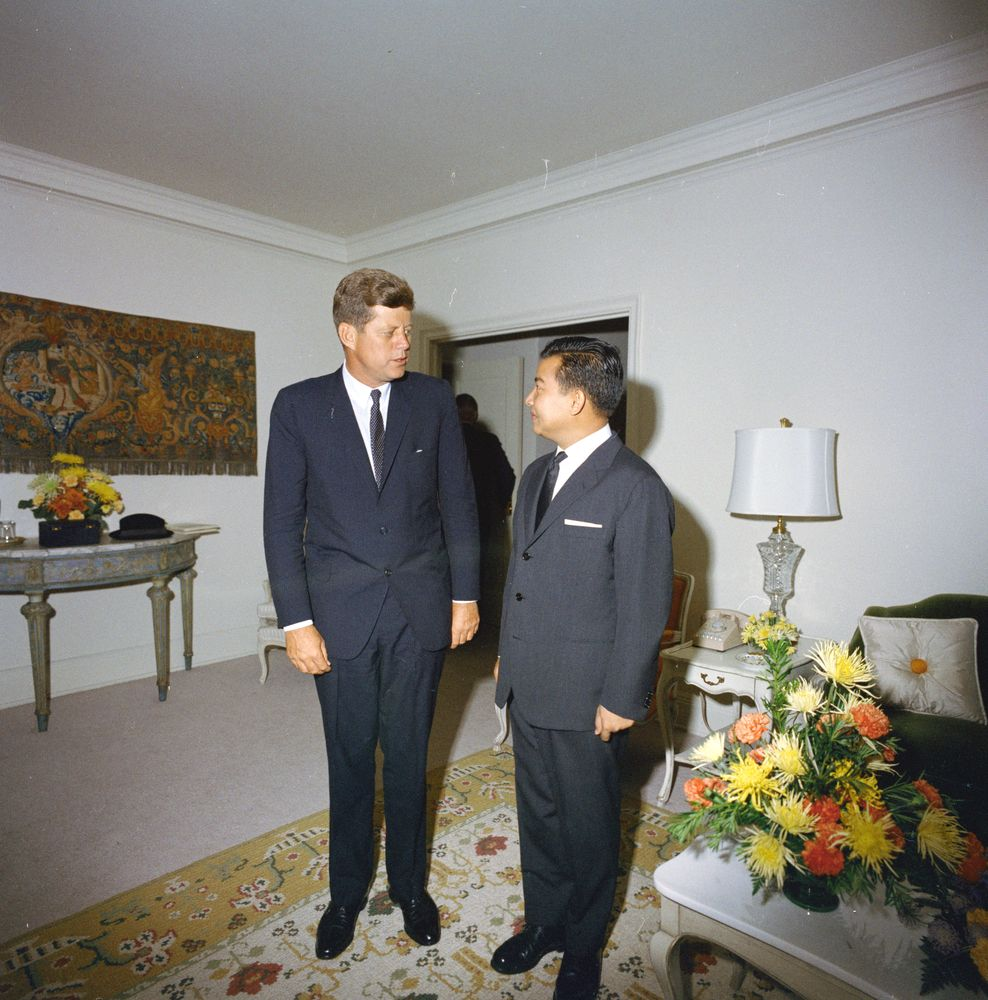
Sihanouk with US President John F. Kennedy in New York City on 25 September 1961

In 1961, Pracheachon's spokesperson, Non Suon, criticized Sihanouk for failing to tackle inflation, unemployment, and corruption in the country. Non Suon's criticisms gave Sihanouk the impetus to arrest Pracheachon leaders, and, according to him, he had discovered plans by their party to monitor local political developments on behalf of foreign powers. That same year Sihanouk attended the 1st Summit of the Non-Aligned Movement, making Cambodia one of the founding members of the Non-Aligned Movement. In May 1962 Tou Samouth, Pracheachon's secretary-general, disappeared, and its ideological ally, the Communist Party of Kampuchea, suspected that Samouth had been secretly captured and killed by police. Sihanouk nevertheless allowed Sangkum's left-wing politicians to run again in the 1962 general elections, which they all won. He even appointed two left-wing politicians, Hou Yuon and Khieu Samphan, as secretaries for planning and commerce, respectively, after the election.

In November 1962, Sihanouk called on the US to stop supporting the Khmer Serei, which he believed they had been secretly doing through the CIA. He threatened to reject all economic aid from the US if they failed to respond to his demands, a threat he later carried out on 19 November 1963. At the same time, Sihanouk also nationalised the country's entrepot trade, banking sector, and distillery industries. To oversee policy and regulatory matters on the country's entrepot trade, he set up the National Export-Import Corporation and Statutory Board, better known as "SONEXIM".

When Sarit, Diem, and US president John F. Kennedy died in November and December 1963, Sihanouk rejoiced over their deaths, as he accused them of attempting to destabilise Cambodia. He organised concerts and granted civil servants extra leave time to celebrate the occasion. When the US government protested Sihanouk's celebrations, he responded by recalling the Cambodian ambassador to the US, Nong Kimny.

In early 1964, Sihanouk signed a secret agreement with North Vietnam and the Viet Cong, allowing Chinese military aid meant for them to be delivered through Sihanoukville's port. In turn, the Cambodian army would be paid for delivering food supplies to the Viet Cong, and at the same time skim off 10 percent of all military hardware supplies. In addition, he also allowed the Viet Cong to build a trail through eastern Cambodia, so that their troops could receive war supplies from North Vietnam. The trail later became known as the Sihanouk Trail. When the US learned of Viet Cong presence in eastern Cambodia, they started a bombing campaign, spurring Sihanouk to sever diplomatic ties with the US in May 1965. As a result of this secret agreement, Communist countries, including China, the Soviet Union, and Czechoslovakia, provided military aid to Cambodia.

=== Continued leadership as Head of State (1966–1970) ===
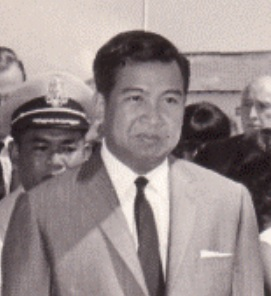
Sihanouk in 1967

In September 1966, general elections were held, and Sangkum legislators with conservative and right-wing sympathies dominated the national assembly. In turn, they nominated Lon Nol, a military general who shared their political sympathies, as prime minister. However, their choice did not sit well with Sihanouk. To counterbalance conservative and right-wing influence, in October 1966 Sihanouk set up a shadow government made up of Sangkum legislators with left-wing sympathies. At the end of the month, Lon Nol offered to resign from his position, but was stopped from doing so by Sihanouk.

In April 1967, the Samlaut Uprising occurred, with local peasants fighting against government troops in Samlaut, Battambang. As soon as government troops managed to quell the fighting, Sihanouk began to suspect that three left-wing Sangkum legislators – Khieu Samphan, Hou Yuon and Hu Nim – had incited the rebellion. When Sihanouk threatened to charge Khieu Samphan and Hou Yuon before a military tribunal, they fled into the jungle to join the Khmer Rouge, leaving Hu Nim behind.

Lon Nol resigned as prime minister in early May 1967, and Sihanouk appointed Son Sann in his place. At the same time, Sihanouk replaced conservative-leaning ministers appointed by Lon Nol with technocrats and left-leaning politicians. In the later part of the month, after receiving news that the Chinese embassy in Cambodia had published and distributed Communist propaganda to the Cambodian populace praising the Cultural Revolution, Sihanouk accused China of supporting local Chinese Cambodians in engaging in "contraband" and "subversive" activities.

In August 1967, Sihanouk sent to China his foreign minister, Norodom Phurissara, who unsuccessfully urged Zhou to stop the Chinese embassy from disseminating Communist propaganda. In response, Sihanouk closed the Cambodia–Chinese Friendship Association in September 1967. When the Chinese government protested, Sihanouk threatened to close the Chinese embassy in Cambodia. Zhou stepped in to placate Sihanouk, and compromised by instructing its embassy to send its publications to Cambodia's information ministry for vetting prior to distribution.

As relations with China worsened, Sihanouk pursued rapprochement with the US. He learned that Kennedy's widow, Jacqueline Kennedy, had expressed a desire to see Angkor Wat. Seeing this as an opportunity to restore relations with the US, Sihanouk invited her to visit Cambodia and personally hosted her visit in October 1967. Jacqueline Kennedy's visit paved the way for Sihanouk to meet with Chester Bowles, the US ambassador to India. To Bowles, Sihanouk expressed his willingness to restore bilateral relations with the US, hinted at the presence of Viet Cong troops in Cambodia, and suggested he would turn a blind eye should US forces enter Cambodia to attack Viet Cong troops retreating into Cambodia from South Vietnam—a practice known as "hot pursuit"—provided that Cambodians were unharmed.

Silhanouk told Bowles that he disliked the Vietnamese as a people, saying he had no love for any Vietnamese, red, blue, North or South". Kenton Clymer notes that this statement "cannot reasonably be construed to mean that Sihanouk approved of the intensive, ongoing B-52 bombing raids" the US launched in eastern Cambodia beginning in March 1969 as part of Operation Menu, adding: "In any event, no one asked him. ... Sihanouk was never asked to approve the B-52 bombings, and he never gave his approval." The bombing forced the Viet Cong to flee from their jungle sanctuaries and seek refuge in populated towns and villages.

As a result, Sihanouk became concerned that Cambodia might get drawn into fighting in the Vietnam War. In June 1969, he extended diplomatic recognition to the Provisional Revolutionary Government of the Republic of South Vietnam (PRGSV), hoping that he could get the Viet Cong troops under its charge to leave Cambodia should they win the war. At the same time, he also openly admitted the presence of Viet Cong troops in Cambodia for the first time, prompting the US to restore formal diplomatic relations with Cambodia three months later.

As the Cambodian economy was stagnating due to systemic corruption, Sihanouk opened two casinos – in Phnom Penh and Sihanoukville – in January 1969. While the casinos satisfied his aim of generating state revenues of up to 700 million riels in that year, it also caused a sharp increase in the number of bankruptcies and suicides. In August 1969 Lon Nol was reappointed as prime minister, with Sisowath Sirik Matak as his deputy. Two months later, Lon Nol left Cambodia to seek medical treatment, leaving Sirik Matak to run the government. Between October and December 1969, Sirik Matak instituted several policy changes that ran contrary to Sihanouk's wishes, such as allowing private banks to re-open in the country and devaluing the riel. He also encouraged ambassadors to write to Lon Nol directly, instead of going through Sihanouk, angering the latter. In early January 1970, Sihanouk left Cambodia for medical treatment in France. Shortly after he left, Sirik Matak took the opportunity to close down the casinos.

== Deposition, GRUNK and Khmer Rouge years ==
=== 1970 coup ===
In January 1970, Sihanouk left Cambodia for a two-month holiday in France, spending his time at a luxury resort in the French Riviera. On 11 March 1970, a large protest took place outside the North Vietnamese and Provisional Revolutionary Government of the Republic of South Vietnam embassies, as protesters demanded Viet Cong troops withdraw from Cambodia. The protests turned chaotic, as protesters looted both embassies and set them on fire, alarming Sihanouk. Sihanouk, who was in Paris at the time, considered both returning to quell the protests and visiting Moscow, Beijing, and Hanoi. He opted for the latter, thinking that he could persuade its leaders to recall Viet Cong troops to their jungle sanctuaries, where they had originally established themselves between 1964 and 1969.

Five days later, Oum Mannorine, the half-brother of Sihanouk's wife Monique, was summoned to the National Assembly to answer corruption charges. On that night after the hearing, Mannorine ordered troops under his command to arrest Lon Nol and Sirik Matak, but ended up getting arrested by Lon Nol's troops instead. On 18 March 1970 the National Assembly voted to depose Sihanouk, allowing Lon Nol to assume emergency powers.

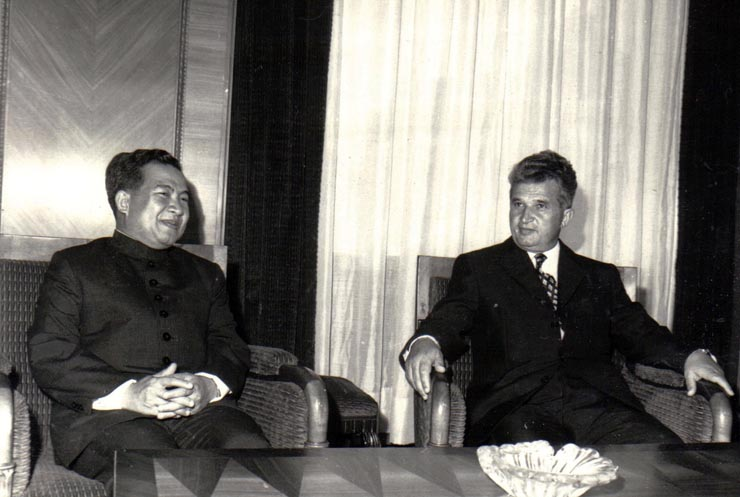
Sihanouk (left) visiting Romania in 1972, with Romanian President Nicolae Ceaușescu

On that day, Sihanouk was in Moscow meeting Soviet prime minister Alexei Kosygin, who broke the news as he was being driven to the Moscow airport. From Moscow, Sihanouk flew to Beijing, where he was received by Zhou Enlai. Zhou arranged for the North Vietnamese Prime Minister, Pham Van Dong to fly to Beijing from Hanoi and meet with Sihanouk. Zhou greeted Sihanouk very warmly, telling him that China still recognized him as the legitimate leader of Cambodia and would be pressuring North Korea, along with several Middle Eastern and African nations, not to recognize Lon Nol's government, saying that once China issued its declaration of support, "the Soviet Union will be embarrassed and will have to reconsider". Both Zhou and Dong encouraged Sihanouk to rebel against Lon Nol and promised him military and financial support.

=== Uneasy alliance ===
On 23 March 1970, Sihanouk announced the formation of his resistance movement, the National United Front of Kampuchea (FUNK). He encouraged the Cambodian populace to join him and fight against Lon Nol's new military government. Sihanouk was revered by the Khmer peasantry as a god-like figure, and his endorsement of the Khmer Rouge had immediate effects. The royal family was so revered that Lon Nol after the coup went to the royal palace, knelt at the feet of the queen mother and begged her forgiveness for deposing her son.

Khmer Rouge soldiers broadcast Sihanouk's message in the Cambodian countryside, which roused demonstrations rooting for his cause that were brutally suppressed by Lon Nol's troops. Sometime later, on 5 May 1970, Sihanouk announced the formation of a government-in-exile known as the Royal Government of the National Union of Kampuchea (GRUNK), leading Communist countries including China, North Vietnam, and North Korea to break relations with the Lon Nol regime. In Phnom Penh, a military trial convened on 2 July 1970, whereby Sihanouk was charged with both treason and corruption in his capacity as Head of State. After a three-day trial, the judges ruled Sihanouk guilty of both charges and sentenced to him to death in absentia on 5 July 1970.

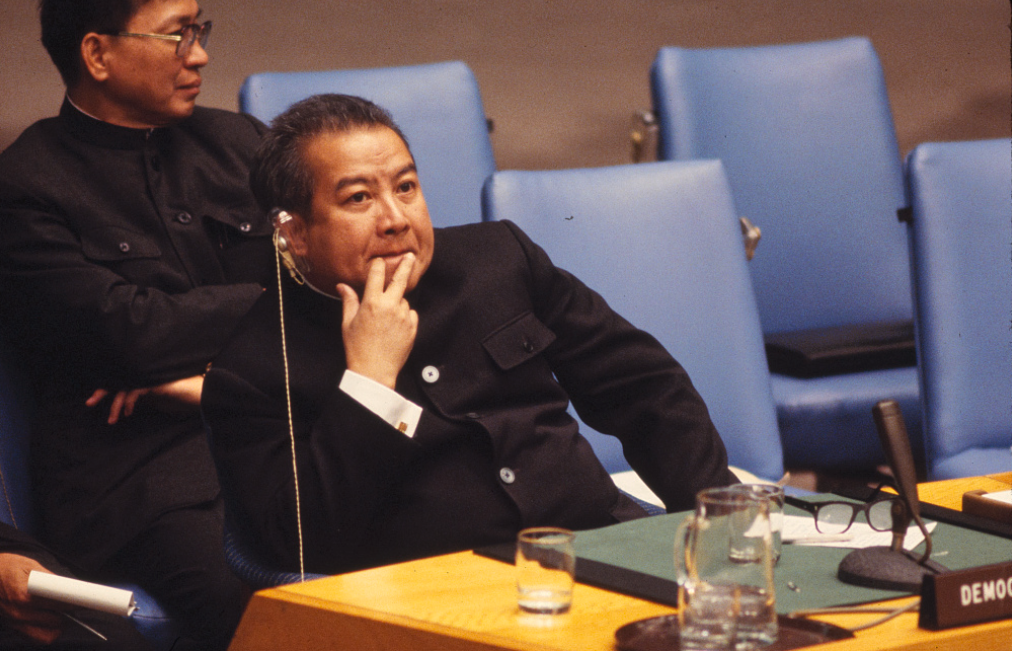
Sihanouk at the United Nations (1972)

Between 1970 and 1975, Sihanouk took up residence in state guesthouses at Beijing and Pyongyang, courtesy of the Chinese and North Korean governments, respectively. In February 1973, Sihanouk traveled to Hanoi, where he started on a long journey with Khieu Samphan and other Khmer Rouge leaders. The convoy proceeded along the Ho Chi Minh trail and reached the Cambodian border at Stung Treng province the following month. From there, they traveled across the provinces of Stung Treng, Preah Vihear, and Siem Reap. Throughout this entire leg of the journey, Sihanouk faced constant bombardment from American planes participating in Operation Freedom Deal. At Siem Reap, Sihanouk visited the temples of Angkor Wat, Banteay Srei, and Bayon. In August 1973, Sisowath Sirik Matak wrote an open letter calling on Sihanouk to bring the Cambodian Civil War to an end and suggesting the possibility of his return to the country. When the letter reached Sihanouk, he angrily rejected Sirik Matak's entreaties.

After the Khmer Republic fell to the Khmer Rouge on 17 April 1975, a new regime under its charge, Democratic Kampuchea, was formed. Sihanouk was appointed as its Head of State, a ceremonial position. In September 1975, Sihanouk briefly returned to Cambodia to inter the ashes of his mother, before going abroad again to lobby for diplomatic recognition of Democratic Kampuchea. He returned on 31 December 1975 and presided over a meeting to endorse the constitution of Democratic Kampuchea. In February 1976, Khieu Samphan took him on a tour across the Cambodian countryside. Sihanouk was shocked to see the use of forced labour and population displacement carried out by the Khmer Rouge government, known as the Angkar. Following the tour, Sihanouk decided to resign as the Head of State. The Angkar initially rejected his resignation request, though they subsequently accepted it in mid-April 1976, retroactively backdating it to 2 April 1976.

=== House arrest ===
From this point onwards, Sihanouk was kept under house arrest at the royal palace. In September 1978, he was removed to another apartment in Phnom Penh's suburbs, where he lived until the end of the year. Throughout his confinement, Sihanouk made several unsuccessful requests to the Angkar to travel overseas. Vietnam invaded Cambodia on 22 December 1978. On 1 January 1979, Sihanouk was taken from Phnom Penh to Sisophon, where he stayed for three days until 5 January, when he was taken back to Phnom Penh. Sihanouk was taken to meet Pol Pot, who briefed him on the Angkar's plans to repulse Vietnamese troops.

On 6 January 1979, Sihanouk was allowed to fly to Beijing from Phnom Penh, where he was greeted by Zhou Enlai's successor, Deng Xiaoping. The next day Phnom Penh fell to advancing Vietnamese troops on 7 January 1979. On 9 January 1979, Sihanouk flew from Beijing to New York to attend the UN Security Council, where he simultaneously condemned the Khmer Rouge for orchestrating the Cambodian genocide as well as the Vietnamese occupation of Cambodia. Sihanouk subsequently sought asylum in China after making two unsuccessful asylum applications with the US and France.

== FUNCINPEC and CGDK years ==
=== Resistance movement ===
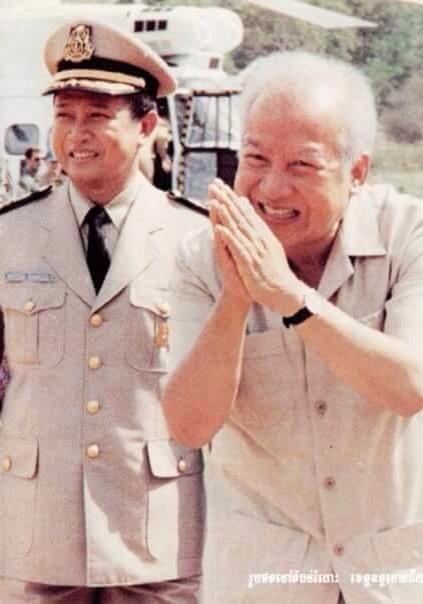
Sihanouk (right) with his son, Prince Norodom Ranariddh, on an ANS inspection tour during the 1980s

After the Khmer Rouge regime was overthrown, a new Cambodian government supported by Vietnam, the People's Republic of Kampuchea (PRK), was established. The Chinese leader, Deng Xiaoping, was unhappy with Vietnam's influence over the PRK government. Deng proposed to Sihanouk that he co-operate with the Khmer Rouge to overthrow the PRK government, but Sihanouk refused, as he opposed the genocidal policies pursued by the Khmer Rouge while they were in power. In March 1981, Sihanouk established the National United Front for an Independent, Neutral, Peaceful and Cooperative Cambodia (FUNCINPEC) which was complemented by a small resistance army known as Armée Nationale Sihanoukiste (ANS).

He appointed In Tam, who had briefly served as prime minister in the Khmer Republic, as the commander-in-chief of ANS. The ANS needed military aid from China, and Deng seized the opportunity to sway Sihanouk into collaborating again with the Khmer Rouge. Sihanouk reluctantly agreed, and started talks in March 1981 with the Khmer Rouge and the Son Sann-led Khmer People's National Liberation Front (KPNLF) on a unified anti-PRK resistance movement.

=== Negotiations and progression ===
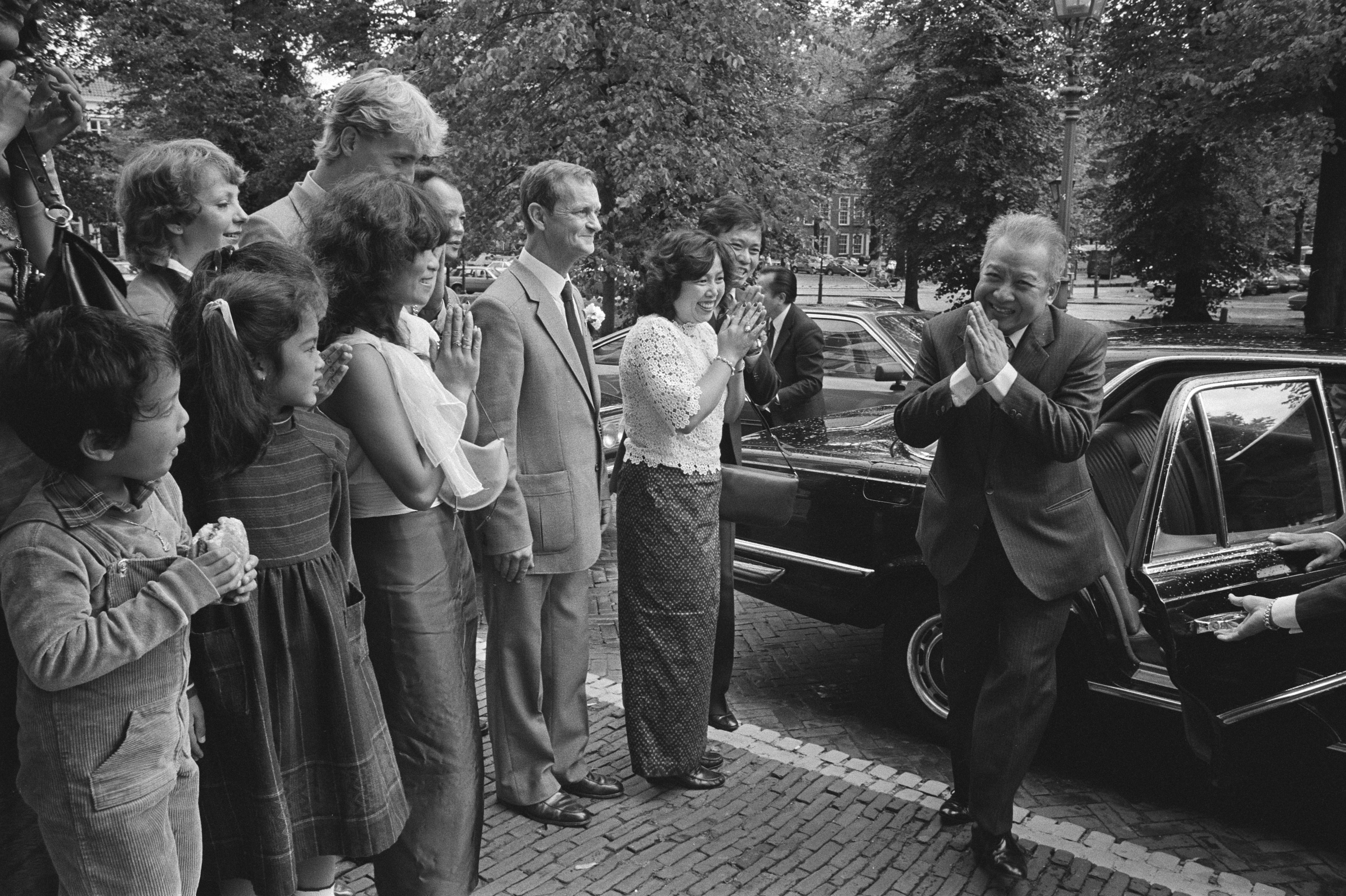
Sihanouk in the Netherlands in 1983

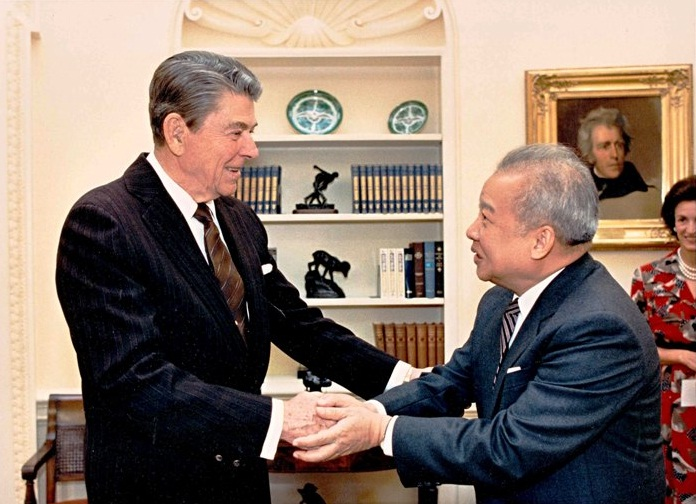
US President Ronald Reagan is seen with Sihanouk in 1988.

After several rounds of negotiations mediated by Deng and Singapore's prime minister Lee Kuan Yew, FUNCINPEC, KPNLF, and the Khmer Rouge agreed to form the Coalition Government of Democratic Kampuchea (CGDK) in June 1982. The CGDK was headed by Sihanouk, and functioned as a government-in-exile. The UN defeated a resolution to expel Democratic Kampuchea and admit the PRK, effectively confirming Sihanouk as Cambodia's internationally recognized head of state.

As CGDK chairperson, Sihanouk unsuccessfully negotiated, over the next five years, with the Chinese government to broker a political settlement to end the Vietnamese occupation of Cambodia. During this period, Sihanouk appointed two of his sons, Norodom Chakrapong and Norodom Ranariddh, to lead the ANS. Chakrapong was appointed as the deputy chief-of-staff for the ANS in March 1985, while Ranariddh was minted to the twin positions of commander-in-chief and the chief-of-staff of the ANS in January 1986, replacing Tam.

In December 1987, the Prime Minister of the PRK government, Hun Sen, first met with Sihanouk to discuss ending the protracted Cambodian–Vietnamese War. The following July, the then-foreign minister of Indonesia, Ali Alatas, brokered the first round of meetings between the four warring Cambodian factions consisting of FUNCINPEC, Khmer Rouge, KPNLF, and the PRK government over the future of Cambodia. Two more rounds of meetings were held in February and May 1989; since all were held near Jakarta, they became known as the Jakarta Informal Meetings (JIM).

In July 1989, Ali Alatas joined French foreign minister Roland Dumas in opening the Paris Peace Conference, where discussions took place regarding plans for Vietnamese troop withdrawal and power-sharing arrangements in a hypothetical future Cambodian government. The following month, Sihanouk resigned as president of FUNCINPEC but remained in the party as an ordinary member. In September 1990, the United Nations (UN) sponsored the establishment of the Supreme National Council of Cambodia (SNC), an administrative body responsible for overseeing the sovereign affairs of Cambodia for an interim period until UN-sponsored elections were held. The creation of the SNC was subsequently ratified with United Nations Security Council Resolution 668. In July 1991 Sihanouk left FUNCINPEC altogether and was elected as the chairperson of the SNC.

== UNTAC administration era ==
=== Paris peace accords and return to Cambodia ===
On 23 October 1991, Sihanouk led the FUNCINPEC, Khmer Rouge, KPNLF, and PRK into signing the Paris Peace Accords. The accords recognised the SNC as a "legitimate representative of Cambodian sovereignty" and created the United Nations Transitional Authority in Cambodia (UNTAC) to serve as a transitional government between 1992 and 1993. In turn, UNTAC was given the mandate to station peacekeeping troops in Cambodia to supervise the disarmament of troops from the four warring Cambodian factions and to carry out national elections by 1993. Sihanouk subsequently returned to Phnom Penh on 14 November 1991. Together with Hun Sen, Sihanouk rode in an open top limousine from Pochentong Airport all the way to the royal palace, greeting city residents who lined the streets to welcome his return.

The UNTAC administration was set up in February 1992, but stumbled in its peacekeeping operations as the Khmer Rouge refused to cooperate in disarmament. In response, Sihanouk urged UNTAC to abandon the Khmer Rouge from the peacekeeping process on two occasions, in July and September 1992. During this period, Sihanouk mostly resided in Siem Reap and occasionally traveled by helicopter to supervise election preparations in KPNLF, FUNCINPEC, and Khmer Rouge resistance bases.

Sihanouk left in November 1992 to seek medical treatment in Beijing, where he stayed for the next six months until his return to Cambodia in May 1993, on the eve of elections. While in Beijing, Sihanouk proposed a Presidential system government for Cambodia to then-UN secretary-general Boutros Boutros-Ghali, but soon dropped the idea after facing opposition from the Khmer Rouge.

=== 1993 elections and pre-monarchical restoration ===
When general elections were held, FUNCINPEC, now headed by Sihanouk's son Norodom Ranariddh, won, while the Cambodian People's Party (CPP) headed by Hun Sen came in second. The CPP was unhappy with the election results, and on 3 June 1993, Hun Sen and Chea Sim called on Sihanouk to lead the government. Sihanouk complied, and announced the formation of a Provisional National Government (PRG) headed by him, with Hun Sen and Ranariddh as his deputies. Ranariddh was surprised at Sihanouk's announcement, as he had not been informed of his father's plans, and joined Australia, China, the United Kingdom, and the United States in opposing the plan. The following day, Sihanouk rescinded his announcement through a national radio broadcast.

On 14 June 1993, Sihanouk was reinstated as the head of state in a Constituent Assembly session presided over by Ranariddh, who took the opportunity to declare the 1970 coup d'état which overthrew Sihanouk as "illegal". As Head of State, Sihanouk renamed the Cambodian military to its pre-1970 namesake, the Royal Cambodian Armed Forces. He also issued orders to officially rename the country from the State of Cambodia to simply "Cambodia", reinstating "Nokor Reach" as the National Anthem of Cambodia with some minor modifications to its lyrics, and the Cambodian flag to its pre-1970 design.

At the same time, Sihanouk appointed Ranariddh and Hun Sen co-prime ministers, with equal powers. This arrangement, which was provisional, was ratified by the Constituent Assembly on 2 July 1993. On 30 August 1993, Ranariddh and Hun Sen met with Sihanouk and presented two draft constitutions, one of them stipulating a constitutional monarchy headed by a king, and another a republic led by a head of state. Sihanouk opted for the draft stipulating Cambodia a constitutional monarchy, which was ratified by the constituent assembly on 21 September 1993.

== Second reign ==
=== Monarchical restoration and political influence ===
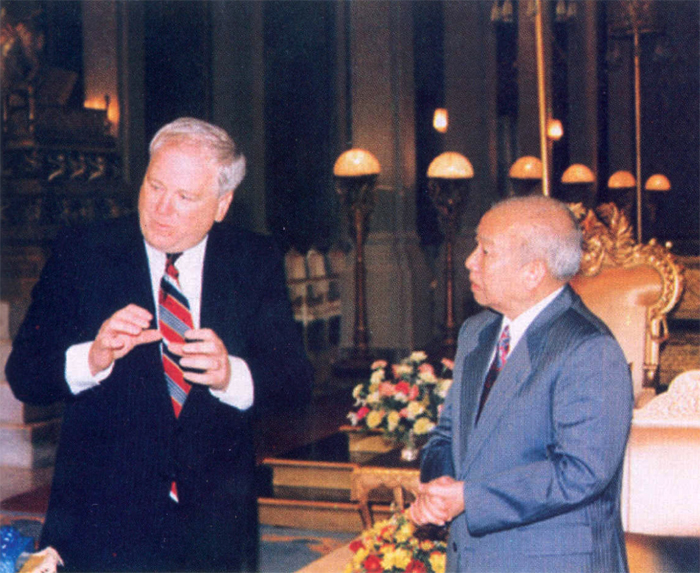
King Sihanouk meeting with US ambassador Kenneth M. Quinn in March 1996 at the Royal Palace in Phnom Penh

The new constitution came into force on 24 September 1993, and Sihanouk was reinstated as the King of Cambodia. A permanent coalition government was formed between FUNCINPEC, CPP and a third political party, the Buddhist Liberal Democratic Party (BLDP). In turn, Sihanouk made Ranariddh and Hun Sen First and Second Prime Ministers, respectively. Shortly after that, Sihanouk left for Beijing, where he spent several months for cancer treatment. In April 1994, Sihanouk returned and the following month called the government to hold new elections so that the Khmer Rouge could be co-opted into the government.

Both Ranariddh and Hun Sen rejected his suggestion, but Sihanouk pressed on, and further proposed a national unity government consisting of FUNCINPEC, CPP, and the Khmer Rouge headed by him. Again, both prime ministers rejected Sihanouk's proposal, arguing that Khmer Rouge's past intransigent attitude made the proposal unrealistic. Sihanouk backed down, and expressed frustration that Hun Sen and Ranariddh had been ignoring him. As both Norodom Sirivudh and Julio Jeldres, his younger half-brother and official biographer, respectively, saw it, this was a clear sign that the monarchy's ability to exert control over national affairs had diminished, at least vis-a-vis the prime ministers.

In July 1994, one of his sons, Norodom Chakrapong, led a failed coup attempt to topple the government. Following the coup attempt, Chakrapong took refuge in a hotel in Phnom Penh, but government troops soon discovered his hideout and surrounded the hotel. Chakrapong called Sihanouk, who negotiated with government representatives to allow him to go into exile in Malaysia. The following November, Sirivudh was accused of plotting to assassinate Hun Sen and imprisoned. Sihanouk intervened to have Sirivudh detained at the interior ministry's headquarters, convinced that there was a secret plan to kill the latter if he were to remain in prison. After Sirivudh was relocated to the safer location, Sihanouk appealed to Hun Sen that Sirivudh be allowed to go into exile in France together with his family. Subsequently, Hun Sen accepted his offer.

Relations between the two co-prime ministers, Ranariddh and Hun Sen, deteriorated from March 1996, when the former accused the CPP of repeatedly delaying the allocation process of low-level government posts to FUNCINPECs. Ranariddh threatened to pull out of the coalition government and hold national elections in the same year if his demands were not met, stoking unease among Hun Sen and other CPP officials. The following month, Sihanouk presided over a meeting between several royal family members and senior FUNCINPEC officials in Paris. Sihanouk attempted to reduce tensions between FUNCINPEC and the CPP by assuring that FUNCINPEC would not leave the coalition government and that there were no reactionary elements planning to bring down Hun Sen or the CPP.

In March 1997, Sihanouk expressed his willingness to abdicate the throne, claiming that rising anti-royalist sentiment among the populace was threatening the monarchy's existence. In response, Hun Sen tersely warned Sihanouk that he would introduce constitutional amendments to prohibit members of the royal family from participating in politics if he followed through on his suggestion. As Widyono saw it, Sihanouk remained popular with the Cambodian electorate, and Hun Sen feared that, should he abdicate and enter politics, he would win in any future elections, thereby undercutting CPP's political clout.

In July 1997, violent clashes erupted in Phnom Penh between infantry forces separately allied to the CPP and FUNCINPEC, which effectively led to Ranariddh's ousting after FUNCINPEC forces were defeated. Sihanouk voiced displeasure with Hun Sen for orchestrating the clashes, but refrained from calling Ranariddh's ouster a "coup d'état", a term which FUNCINPEC members used. When the National Assembly elected Ung Huot as the First Prime Minister to replace Ranariddh on 6 August 1997, Sihanouk charged that Ranariddh's ouster was illegal and renewed his offer to abdicate the throne, a plan which did not materialize.

In September 1998, Sihanouk meditated political talks in Siem Reap after the FUNCINPEC and the Sam Rainsy Party (SRP) staged protests against the CPP-led government for irregularities over the 1998 general elections. The talks broke down at the end of the month after Hun Sen narrowly escaped an assassination attempt, which he accused Sam Rainsy of masterminding. Two months later, in November 1998, Sihanouk brokered a second round of political talks between the CPP and FUNCINPEC whereby an agreement was reached for another coalition government between the CPP and FUNCINPEC.

=== Final years as king ===
Sihanouk maintained a monthly bulletin in which he wrote commentaries on political issues and posted old photos of Cambodia in the 1950s and 1960s. In 1997, a character known by the name of "Ruom Rith" first appeared in his monthly bulletin, expressing critical comments on Hun Sen and the government. Hun Sen became offended by Ruom Rith's criticisms, and on at least two occasions in 1998 and 2003 persuaded Sihanouk to stop publishing his comments. According to Ranariddh, Ruom Rith was an alter ego of Sihanouk, a claim which the latter vehemently denied. In July 2002, Sihanouk expressed concern over the absence of detailed constitutional provisions over the organization and functioning of the Cambodian throne council. When Hun Sen rejected Sihanouk's concern, the latter followed up in September 2002 by threatening to abdicate, so as to force the throne council to convene and elect a new monarch.

In July 2003, general elections were held again, and the CPP won. However, they failed to secure two-thirds of all parliamentary seats, as required by the constitution to form a new government. The two runner-up parties of the election, FUNCINPEC and SRP, blocked the CPP from doing so. Instead, in August 2003 they filed complaints with the Constitutional Council over alleged electoral irregularities. After their complaints were rejected, FUNCINPEC and SRP threatened to boycott the swearing-in ceremony of parliamentarians. Sihanouk coaxed both parties to change their decision, stating that he would abstain from presiding over the ceremony as well if they did not comply with his wishes.

Both parties eventually backed off from their threats, and the swearing-in ceremony was held in October 2003, with Sihanouk in attendance. The CPP, FUNCINPEC, and SRP held additional talks into 2004 to break the political stalemate, but to no avail. At the same time, Sihanouk proposed a unity government jointly led by politicians from all three political parties, which Hun Sen and Ranariddh both rebuffed.

In February 2004, Sihanouk advocated and publicly backed same-sex marriage, at a time when the matter was relatively taboo and against Cambodia's backdrop as a conservative society and was praised for his support for the nation's LGBT demographic.

Sihanouk also engaged in pursuing philanthropy with his establishment of the "Samdech Euv Team" whose primary purpose is to assist in humanitarian works and projects throughout the country, of which he would later dedicate much of himself during his retirement years.

== Abdication and retirement ==
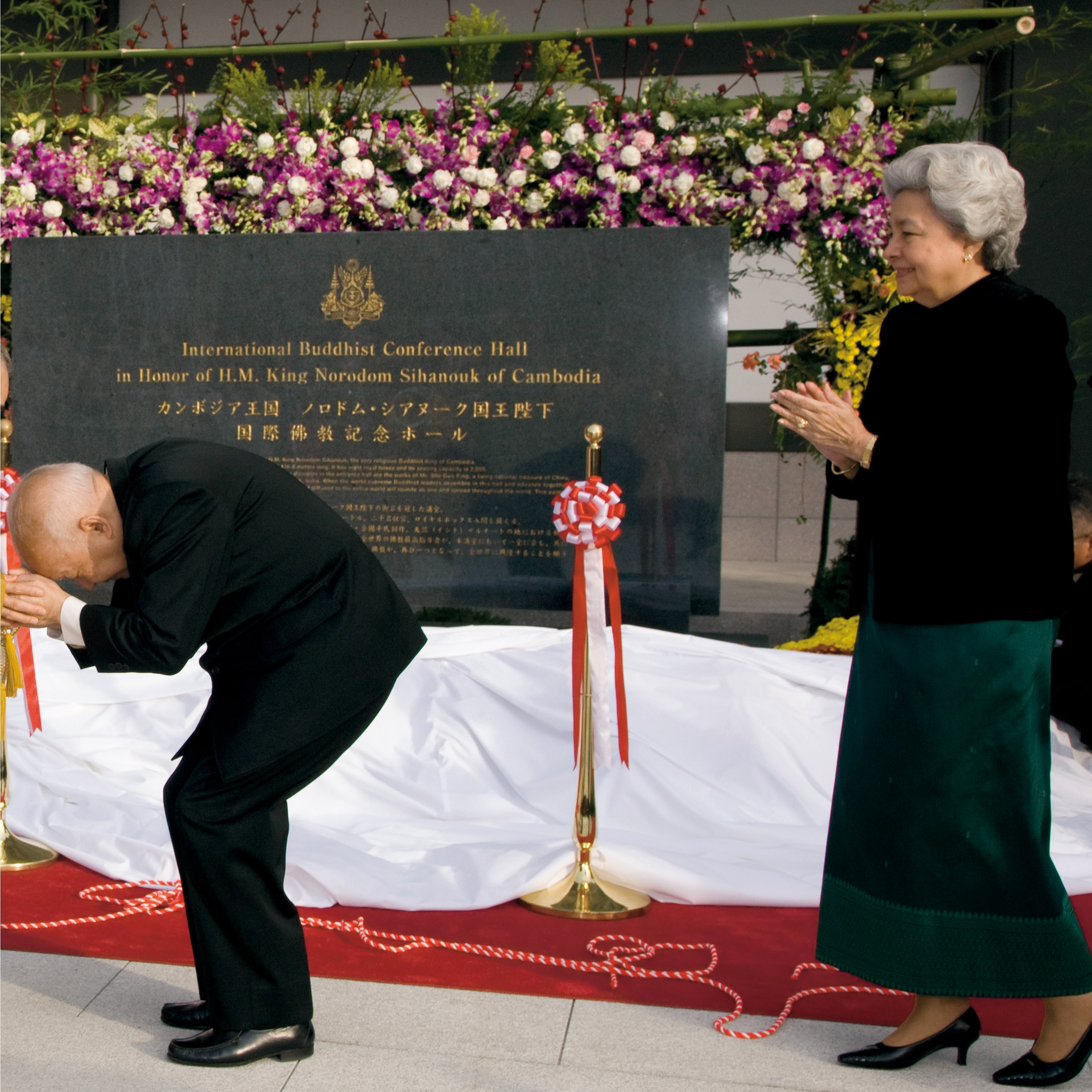
King-Father Sihanouk and Queen-Mother Monineath in 2011

On 6 July 2004, in an open letter, King Sihanouk announced his plans to abdicate once again. At the same time, he criticised Hun Sen and Ranariddh for ignoring his suggestions on how to resolve the political stalemate of the past year. Meanwhile, Hun Sen and Ranariddh had agreed to introduce a constitutional amendment that provided for an open voting system, requiring parliamentarians to select cabinet ministers and the president of the National Assembly by a show of hands. Sihanouk disapproved of the open voting system, calling upon Senate President Chea Sim not to sign the amendment. When Chea Sim heeded Sihanouk's advice, he was ferried out of the country shortly before the National Assembly convened to vote on the amendment on 15 July.

On 17 July 2004, the CPP and FUNCINPEC agreed to form a coalition government, leaving SRP out as an opposition party. On 6 October 2004, Sihanouk wrote a letter calling for the throne council to convene and select a successor. The National Assembly and Senate both held emergency meetings to pass laws allowing for the abdication of the monarch. On 14 October 2004, the throne council unanimously voted to select his son Norodom Sihamoni as Sihanouk's successor. Sihamoni was crowned as the King of Cambodia on 29 October 2004.

In March 2005, Sihanouk accused Thailand, Laos, and Vietnam of encroaching into Cambodian territory, through unilateral border demarcation exercises without Cambodian participation. Two months later, Sihanouk formed the Supreme National Council on Border Affairs (SNCBA), which he headed, to address these concerns. While the SRP and Chea Sim expressed support for Sihanouk for the formation of the SNCBA, Hun Sen decided to form a separate body, National Authority on Border Affairs (NABA), to deal with border concerns, with SNCBA to serve only as an advisory body. After Hun Sen signed a border treaty with Vietnam in October 2005, Sihanouk dissolved the SNCBA.

In August 2007, the Cambodian Action Committee for Justice and Equity, a US-based human rights NGO, called for Sihanouk's State immunity to be lifted, so as to allow him to testify in the Extraordinary Chambers in the Courts of Cambodia (ECCC). Sihanouk responded to the call by inviting the ECCC's United Nations chief public affairs officer, Peter Wickwire Foster, for a discussion session on his personal experience under the Khmer Rouge regime, which he said would be the only opportunity for the court to hear his testimony. The interview was to take place at the Royal Palace, and broadcast across the nation on large screens in public squares. "After this it will no longer be necessary for me to present myself before the UN's ECCC," the Kings invitation said. The note added that if the UN did not accept the invitation he "will not accept to see, speak or correspond with the UN's ECCC." Both Hun Sen and FUNCINPEC criticized the suggestion, with the latter accusing the NGO of being disrespectful. The ECCC subsequently rejected Sihanouk's invitation on the basis of Foster not having legal authority to take testimony. On the day of the planned interview Cambodian television broke away from normal programming to broadcast an empty meeting room with staff appearing to be waiting for Foster to arrive.

The following year, Cambodian–Thai relations became strained because of a preexisting border dispute, involving overlapping claims on the land area surrounding Preah Vihear, an 11th century Hindu temple. Sihanouk issued a communiqué in July 2008 emphasising the Khmer architecture of the temple as well as ICJ's 1962 ruling of the temple in favour of Cambodia. In August 2009, Sihanouk stated that he would stop posting messages on his personal website as he was getting old, making it difficult for him to keep up with his personal duties. Between 2009 and 2011, Sihanouk spent most of his time in Beijing for medical care. He made a final public appearance in Phnom Penh on his 89th birthday and 20th anniversary of the Paris Peace Accords on 30 October 2011. Thereafter, Sihanouk expressed his intent to stay in Cambodia indefinitely, but returned to Beijing in January 2012 for further medical treatment at the advice of his Chinese doctors.

== Death and funeral ==
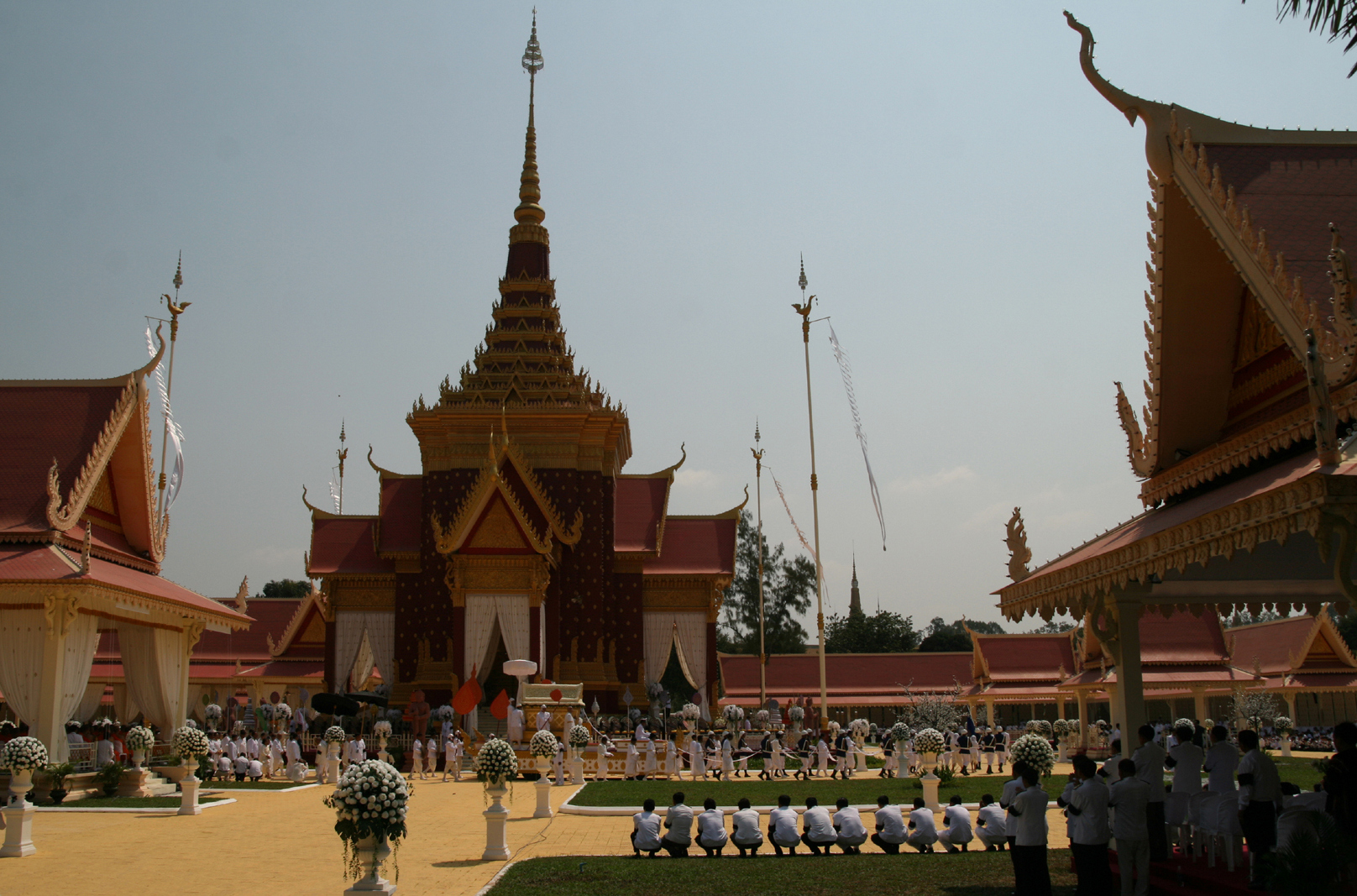
King-father Norodom Sihanouk's funeral pyre

In January 2012, Sihanouk issued a letter in which he expressed his wish that his body be cremated after his death, and his ashes be interred in a golden urn. A few months later, in September 2012, Sihanouk said that he would not return to Cambodia from Beijing for his 90th birthday, citing fatigue. On 15 October 2012, Sihanouk died of a heart attack at 1:20 am, Phnom Penh time. When the news broke, Sihamoni, Hun Sen, and other government officials flew to Beijing to pay their last respects.

The Cambodian government announced an official mourning period of seven days between 17 and 24 October 2012, and state flags were ordered to fly at one-third height. Two days later, Sihanouk's body was brought back from Beijing on an Air China flight, and about 1.2 million people lined the streets from the airport to the royal palace to witness the return of Sihanouk's cortège.

In late November 2012, Hun Sen said that Sihanouk's funeral and cremation were to be carried out in February 2013. Sihanouk's body lay in state at the royal palace for the next three months until the funeral was held on 1 February 2013. A 6,000-metre (20,000 ft) street procession was held, and Sihanouk's body was subsequently kept at the royal crematorium until 4 February 2013 when his body was cremated.

The following day, the royal family scattered some of Sihanouk's ashes at the confluence of the Mekong, Tonle Sap and Tonle Bassac rivers, while the rest were kept in the palace's throne hall for about a year. In October 2013, a stupa featuring a bronze statue of Sihanouk was inaugurated next to the Independence Monument. In July 2014, Sihanouk's ashes were interred at the Silver Pagoda next to those of one of his daughters, Princess Norodom Kantha Bopha.

== Legacy ==
Sihanouk was at the forefront of Cambodian public life for more than 60 years, serving in various capacities and was one of the most consequential leaders in modern Cambodian history. Martin Woollacott said "No monarch in modern times has embodied the life and fate of his country so completely as Norodom Sihanouk."

This was reflected in him being the Guinness World Record holder for "Most state roles held by a modern royal." In chronological order of positions held, Sihanouk served in the following roles: king, prime minister, head (chief) of state, regent, head of the government-in-exile, president, president-in-exile, head of the government-in-exile, president of the Supreme National Council, head of state, king.

Credited as one of the 'great survivors' of contemporary Asian politics and described as a charismatic, albeit mercurial figure, observers viewed Sihanouk's legacy as a complex one that is difficult to adequately quantify with precision with both achievements and failings in near equal measure. Sihanouk himself once referenced William Shakespeare as a means to do 'literary justice' to his legacy. David Chandler and Milton Osborne, leading scholars on Cambodia, reflected on this notion, acknowledging that on one hand, as the father of Cambodian independence during the French protectorate era, he deserves great praise for his instrumental efforts that resulted in a self-governing Cambodia. On the other hand, his alignment with the Khmer Rouge after his ousting in the 1970 Cambodian coup d'état by Lon Nol tainted his reputation, although it was believed Sihanouk was not aware of the genocidal intentions of the Khmer Rouge, as he too, was impacted by the regime, with his house arrest and the deaths of several of his family members. Sihanouk would later formally condemn the regime and its worst excesses.

Norodom Sihanouk Memorial in Phnom Penh

However, as Woollacott noted, given the context of the country's tumultuous history, "to Cambodians, Sihanouk represented continuity when so much in their country had been destroyed. They valued his warmth and his evident concern for his people, while recognising that he had made many mistakes." Indeed, Sihanouk's own tumultuous life is sometimes described as mirroring that of his country and he also expressed regret at some of his shortcomings during his time at the helm of Cambodia. Chandler and Osborne observed that despite his flaws, he was devoted to his country. Moreover, this perspective is echoed by Jamie Metzl, a former Executive Vice President of the Asia Society, who commended Sihanouk's patriotism and remarked that "the totality of his life's work demonstrates an unflappable commitment" to Cambodia, notwithstanding the aforementioned reputational blight.

To that end, he commanded the deep loyalty and respect of Cambodians who "throughout coups, wars, regime changes and famine - even a full-scale genocide", found in Sihanouk, whom they considered as a "God king", as "the one stable influence in their otherwise turbulent lives", which is also underscored by his status as the overarching unifying figure of the country. This was evident in opinion polling data released by the Cambodian Information Centre for the period between 1986 and 1997, which revealed he was the most popular leader in the country, with an approval rating ranging from a low of 56% to a high of 72% among respondents who were surveyed. According to Henri Locard, a historian specializing in Cambodia, he believes Sihanouk's stature in the overall national consciousness is on the same level as the foremost symbols of Cambodia, such as Angkor and the national flag, calling him as "the symbol of the country."

== Artistic works ==
=== Film-making ===
Sihanouk produced about 50 films throughout his lifetime. He developed an interest in the cinema at a young age, which he attributed to frequent trips to the cinema with his parents. Shortly after becoming king in 1941, Sihanouk made a few amateur films, and sent Cambodian students to study film-making in France. When the film Lord Jim was released in 1965, Sihanouk was vexed with the negative portrayal it gave of Cambodia. In response, Sihanouk produced his first feature film, Apsara, in 1966. He went on to produce, direct, and act in eight more films between 1966 and 1969, roping in members of the royal family and military generals to star in his films.

Sihanouk expressed that his films were created with the intent of portraying Cambodia in a positive light. Milton Osborne also noted that the films were filled with Cold War and nationalist propaganda themes. Sihanouk's former adviser, Charles Meyer, said that his films created from the 1960s were of amateur standard, while the director of Reyum Institute, Ly Daravuth, similarly commented in 2006 that his films lacked artistic qualities.

In 1967, one of his films, The Enchanted Forest, was nominated at the 5th Moscow International Film Festival. In 1968, Sihanouk launched the Phnom Penh International Film Festival, which was held for a second time in 1969. In both years, a special award category was designated, the Golden Apsara Prize, of which Sihanouk was its only nominee and winner. After Sihanouk was ousted in 1970, he ceased producing films for the next seventeen years until 1987.

In 1997, Sihanouk received a special jury prize from the International Film Festival of Moscow, where he revealed that he had received a budget ranging from US$20,000 to US$70,000 for each of his film productions from the Cambodian government. Six years later, Sihanouk donated his film archives to the École française d'Extrême-Orient in France and Monash University in Australia. In 2006, he produced his last film, Miss Asina, and then declared his retirement from film-making in May 2010.

=== Music ===
Sihanouk wrote at least 48 musical compositions between the late 1940s and the early 1970s, combining both traditional Khmer and Western themes into his works. From the 1940s until the 1960s, Sihanouk's compositions were mostly based on sentimental, romantic and patriotic themes. Sihanouk's romantic songs reflected his numerous romantic liaisons, particularly his relationship with his wife Monique, and compositions such as "My Darling" and "Monica" were dedicated to her. He also wrote nationalistic songs, meant to showcase the beauty of provincial towns and at the same time foster a sense of patriotism and national unity among Cambodians. Notable compositions, such as "Flower of Battambang", "Beauty of Kep City", "Phnom Kulen", and "Phnom Penh", are examples of these. A few of his other compositions, including "Luang Prabang", "Nostalgia of China", and "Goodbye Bogor" were sentimental songs about neighbouring countries including Laos, Indonesia, and China.

After he was ousted as head of state in 1970, Sihanouk wrote several revolutionary-style songs that praised the leaders of Communist countries, including "Hommage Khmer au Maréchal Kim Il Sung" and "Merci, Piste Ho Chi Minh". They were intended to show his gratitude toward the Communist leaders, which had supported GRUNK between 1970 and 1975. From a young age, Sihanouk learned to play several musical instruments including the clarinet, saxophone, piano, and accordion. Filipino politician and songwriter Raul Manglapus noted in 1974 that he had held jam sessions with Sihanouk and King Bhumibol Adulyadej, both of whom he regarded as "excellent saxophonists".

In the 1960s, Sihanouk led a musical band made up of his relatives, who would perform French songs and his own personal compositions for diplomats at the royal palace. In his tours across Cambodian provinces, Sihanouk was accompanied by the Royal Military Orchestra and Cambodian pop singers. Later, while Sihanouk was living in exile during the 1980s, he hosted concerts to entertain diplomats whenever he visited the United Nations Headquarters in New York City. After he was reinstated as king in 1993, Sihanouk continued to perform in concerts held at the royal palace on an occasional basis.

Until his death, Sihanouk continued to make musical performances of his original works as well as covers of other artists. Despite his death due to cardiac arrest, as of 2025, Sihanouk's official youtube account is currently active, and will generally respond to any comments posted upon its videos.

== Titles and styles ==
Styles of King Norodom Sihanouk of Cambodia
- Reference style: His Majesty
- Spoken style: Your Majesty

Sihanouk was known by many formal and informal titles throughout his lifetime, and as aforementioned, the Guinness Book of World Records identifies Sihanouk as the royal who had served the greatest variety of state and political offices. When Sihanouk became king in 1941, he was bestowed with the official title of "Preah Bat Samdech Preah Norodom Sihanouk Varman" (ព្រះបាទសម្តេចព្រះ នរោត្តម សីហនុ វរ្ម័ន), which he used for both reigns between 1941 and 1955 and again from 1993 to 2004. He reverted to the title of Prince after he abdicated 1955, and in that year was given by his father and successor the title of "Samdech Preah Upayuvareach" (សម្តេចព្រះឧបយុវរាជ), which translates in English as "The Prince who has been King". Starting from the early 1960s when he became the Head of State, Sihanouk was affectionately known to most Cambodians as "Samdech Euv" (សម្តេចឪ), which translates as the "Prince Father" in English.

In 2004, after his second abdication, Sihanouk became known as the King Father of Cambodia, with the official title of "Preah Karuna Preah Bat Sâmdach Preah Norodom Sihanouk Preahmâhaviraksat" (Khmer: ព្រះករុណាព្រះបាទសម្តេចព្រះ នរោត្តម សីហនុ ព្រះមហាវីរក្សត្រ). He was also referred to by another honorific, "His Majesty King Norodom Sihanouk The Great Heroic King King-Father of Khmer independence, territorial integrity and national unity" (ព្រះករុណា ព្រះបាទសម្ដេចព្រះ នរោត្តម សីហនុ ព្រះមហាវីរក្សត្រ ព្រះវររាជបិតាឯករាជ្យ បូរណភាពទឹកដី និងឯកភាពជាតិខ្មែរ).

At the same time, he issued a royal decree requesting to be called "Samdech Ta" (សម្ដេចតា) or "Samdech Ta-tuot" (សម្ដេចតាទួត), which translates as "Grandfather" and "Great-grandfather", respectively, in English. When Sihanouk died in October 2012, he was bestowed by his son Sihamoni with the posthumous title of "Preah Karuna Preah Norodom Sihanouk Preah Borom Ratanakkot" (ព្រះករុណាព្រះនរោត្តម សីហនុ ព្រះបរមរតនកោដ្ឋ), which literally translates as "The King who lies in the Diamond Urn" in English.

== Personal life ==
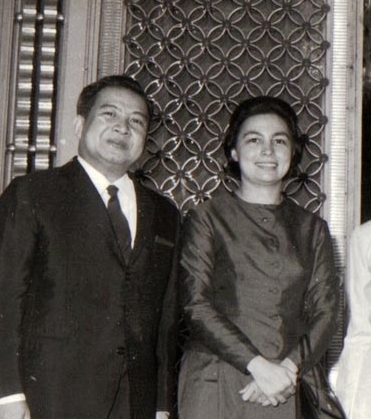
King-Father Norodom Sihanouk and his wife Queen-Mother Norodom Monineath

He was fluent in Khmer, French, and English, and also learned Greek and Latin in high school. In his high school days, Sihanouk played football, basketball, volleyball, and also took up horse riding. He suffered from diabetes and depression in the 1960s, which flared up again in the late 1970s while living in captivity under the Khmer Rouge.

In November 1992, Sihanouk suffered a stroke caused by the thickening of the coronary arteries and blood vessels. In 1993, he was diagnosed with B cell lymphoma in the prostate and was treated with chemotherapy and surgery. Sihanouk's lymphoma went into remission in 1995, but returned again in 2005 in the gastric region. He suffered a third bout of lymphoma in 2008, and after prolonged treatment it went into remission the following year.

In 1960, Sihanouk built a personal residence at Chamkarmon District where he lived over the next ten years as the Head of State. Following his overthrow in 1970, Sihanouk took up residence in Beijing, where he lived at the Diaoyutai State Guesthouse in the first year of his stay. In 1971, Sihanouk moved to a larger residence in the city that once housed the French embassy. The residence was equipped with a temperature-adjustable swimming pool, cinema and seven chefs.

In 1974 North Korean leader Kim Il Sung built Changsuwon, a 40-room mansion, for Sihanouk. Changsuwon was built near an artificial lake, and Sihanouk spent time taking boat trips there and also shot a few films within the compound. In August 2008, Sihanouk declared his assets on his website, which according to him consisted of a small house in Siem Reap and 30,000 euros of cash savings stored in a French bank. He also stated that his residences in Beijing and Pyongyang were guesthouses owned by the governments of China and North Korea, respectively, and that they did not belong to him.

=== Family ===
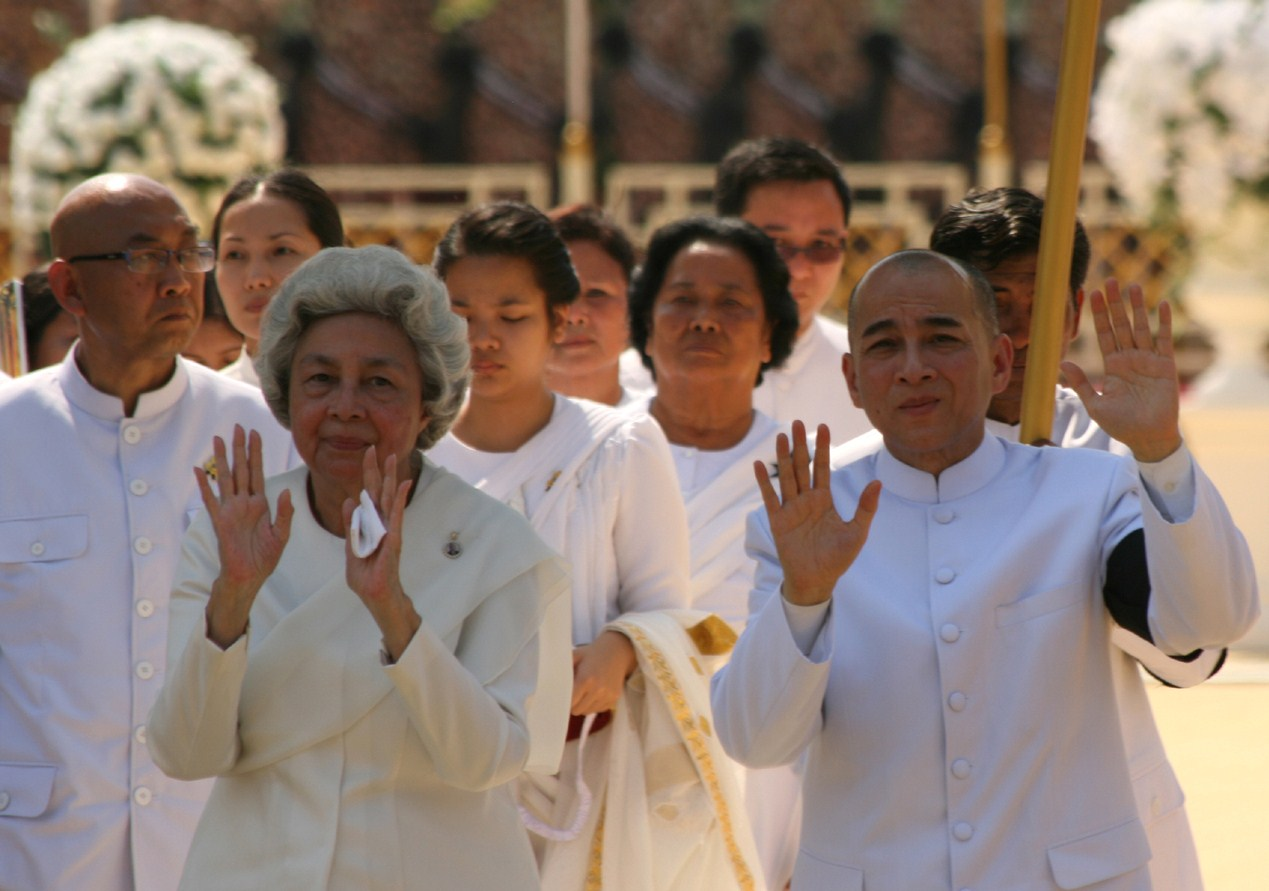
Sihanouk's spouse, Queen-Mother Norodom Monineath, and their son King Norodom Sihamoni photographed at Sihanouk's funeral. To the extreme left is Sihanouk's half-brother, Prince Norodom Sirivudh.

On 4 March 1955, Sihanouk married Norodom Thavet Norleak, as his official wife, who was a cousin from his mother's side. One day later, he married Paule Monique Izzi, as his secondary consort, who was the daughter of Pomme Peang, a Cambodian, and Jean-François Izzi, a French banker of Italian ancestry. Monique became Sihanouk's lifelong partner; in the 1990s, she changed her name to Monineath. Before these marriages, Sihanouk married unofficially to four other women: Phat Kanhol, Sisowath Pongsanmoni, Sisowath Monikessan, and Mam Manivan Phanivong.

Monikessan died in childbirth in 1946. His marriages to the other four women, including his official wife Thavet Norleak, all ended in divorce. Sihanouk had fourteen children with five different wives. Thavet Norleak bore him no children. During the Khmer Rouge years, five children and fourteen grandchildren disappeared. Sihanouk believed they were killed by the Khmer Rouge.

Sihanouk had the following issue:

Name	Year of birth	Year of death	Mother	Cause of death
Norodom Buppha Devi	1943	2019	Phat Kanhol	
Norodom Yuvaneath	1943	2021	Sisowath Pongsanmoni	
Norodom Ranariddh	1944	2021	Phat Kanhol	
Norodom Ravivong	1944	1973	Sisowath Pongsanmoni	Malaria
Norodom Chakrapong	1945		Sisowath Pongsanmoni	
Norodom Naradipo	1946	1976	Sisowath Monikessan	Disappeared under Khmer Rouge
Norodom Sorya Roeungsi	1947	1976	Sisowath Pongsanmoni	Disappeared under Khmer Rouge
Norodom Kantha Bopha	1948	1952	Sisowath Pongsanmoni	Leukemia
Norodom Khemanourak	1949	1975	Sisowath Pongsanmoni	Disappeared under Khmer Rouge
Norodom Botum Bopha	1951	1975	Sisowath Pongsanmoni	Disappeared under Khmer Rouge
Norodom Sujata	1953	1975	Mam Manivan	Disappeared under Khmer Rouge
Norodom Sihamoni	1953		Monique Izzi (Monineath)	
Norodom Narindrapong	1954	2003	Monique Izzi (Monineath)	Heart attack
Norodom Arunrasmy	1955		Mam Manivan	

=== Ancestry ===
Ancestors of Norodom Sihanouk

8. Norodom of Cambodia
4. Norodom Sothearos
9. Bossaba Yem
2. Norodom Suramarit
10. Norodom of Cambodia (=8)
5. Norodom Phangangam
11. Bopha Nuon
1. Norodom Sihanouk
12. Sisowath of Cambodia
6. Sisowath Monivong
13. Van
3. Sisowath Kossamak
14. Norodom Hassakan
7. Norodom Kanviman Norleak Tevi
15. Sao Sambhat

== Bibliography ==
=== Books ===
- Ma, Jisen (2004). The Cultural Revolution in the Foreign Ministry of China. Chinese University Press. ISBN 978-9629961497.
- Bates, Miner Searle, ed. (1969). China in Change: An Approach to Understanding. Friendship Press. ISBN 978-0377190016.
- Lea, David; Milward, Colette, eds. (2001). A Political Chronology of South-East Asia and Oceania. Routledge. ISBN 978-1857431179.
- Richardson, Collins; Karam, Abdul-Ghani (2024). Cambodia History Unveiled: The Untold Story of the Former Khmer Republic. WorldBestBlog Publishing.
- Kiernan, Ben (1975). The Samlaut Rebellion and Its Aftermath, 1967-1970: The Origins of Cambodia's Liberation Movement. Vol. Part 2. Monash University.
- Kislenko, Arne (2000). Bamboo in the Wind: United States Foreign Policy and Thailand During the Kennedy and Johnson Administrations 1961-1969. University of Toronto. ISBN 978-0612499058.
- Bloodworth, Dennis (1975). An Eye for the Dragon: South-East Asia Observed, 1954–73. Penguin.
- Leifer, Michael (2005). Chin, Kin Wah; Suryadinata, Leo (eds.). Michael Leifer: Selected Works on Southeast Asia. Institute of Southeast Asian Studies. ISBN 978-9812302700.
- British Broadcasting Corporation. Monitoring Service (1967). Summary of World Broadcasts: Far East. Vol. Part 3. Monitoring Service of the British Broadcasting Corporation.
- Sihanouk, Norodom (1973). Statements by Prince Norodom Sihanouk, 1965-1973. Embassy of the Khmer Republic, Press Section.
- The Republic. Vol. 1–21. The Republic. 1971.
- Tyner, James A. (2023). Famine in Cambodia: Geopolitics, Biopolitics, Necropolitics. University of Georgia Press. ISBN 978-0820363745.
- Ali, Niloufer Wajid (1975). Communist China and South & Southeast Asia, October 1949-June 1972. Niloufer.
- Szajkowski, Bogdan, ed. (2004). Revolutionary and Dissident Movements of the World. John Harper. ISBN 978-0954381127.
- Arnold, Guy (1991). Revolutionary and Dissident Movements: An International Guide. Longman. ISBN 978-0582086920.
- Sambandan, V. T. (1983). Asian Almanac. Vol. 21. V.T. Sambandan.
- Keyes, Charles F.; Kendall, Laurel; Hardacre, Helen, eds. (1994). Asian Visions of Authority: Religion and the Modern States of East and Southeast Asia. University of Hawaii Press. ISBN 978-0824814717.
- Huang, Zhaoyuan, ed. (2006). Direct Democracy in Asia: A Reference Guide to the Legislations and Practices. Taiwan Foundation for Democracy.
- Biswas, Asit K.; Sachdeva, Pawan K.; Tortajada, Cecilia (2020). Phnom Penh Water Story: Remarkable Transformation of an Urban Water Utility. Springer Nature Singapore. ISBN 978-9813340657.
- Crump, Thomas (2007). Asia-Pacific: A History of Empire and Conflict. Bloomsbury Academic. ISBN 978-1852855185.
- Broadhurst, Roderic; Bouhours, Thierry; Bouhours, Brigitte (2015). Violence and the Civilising Process in Cambodia. Cambridge University Press. ISBN 978-1107109117.
- Rainsy, Sam (2013). We Didn't Start the Fire: My Struggle for Democracy in Cambodia. Silkworm Books. ISBN 978-1627761628.
- Deth, Sok Udom (2020). A History of Cambodia-Thailand Diplomatic Relations 1950-2020. Galda Verlag. ISBN 978-3962031305.
- Anderson, David L., ed. (2011). The Columbia History of the Vietnam War. Columbia University Press. ISBN 978-0231509329.
- Department of External Affairs (1959). "Current Notes on International Affairs". Current Notes on International Affairs. 30. Department of External Affairs, Australia.
- Munson, Frederick P. (1963). Area Handbook for Cambodia. Vol. 1. U.S. Government Printing Office.
- Dommen, Arthur J. (2002). The Indochinese Experience of the French and the Americans: Nationalism and Communism in Cambodia, Laos, and Vietnam. Indiana University Press. ISBN 978-0253109255.
- MBN International (2007). Who's Who, the Most Influential People in Cambodia. MBN International.
- Yao, Meng-hsüan (1980). The Change of Chinese Communist Foreign Policy (1949-1979). World Anti-Communist League, China Chapter.
- PRK MFA (1984). The Chinese Rulers' Crimes Against Kampuchea. Ministry of Foreign Affairs, People's Republic of Kampuchea.
- Touch, Sok; Wang, Linggui; Phea, Kin; Gu, Jiayun; Zhao, Jianglin, eds. (2023). Cambodia-China Comprehensive Strategic Partnership Towards a Community with a Shared Future. Springer Nature Singapore. ISBN 978-9811991554.
- Daddis, Gregory A. (2025). Faith and Fear: America's Relationship with War Since 1945. Oxford University Press. ISBN 978-0197804223.
- D'Agnes, Thomas (2012). Dr. V: An Extraordinary Journey. iUniverse. ISBN 978-1469745121.
- Simons, Geoff (2016). The United Nations: A Chronology of Conflict. Palgrave Macmillan UK. ISBN 978-1349233892.
- Frazier, Howard, ed. (1978). Uncloaking the CIA. Free Press. ISBN 978-0029105900.
- Kumar, Satish (1981). CIA and the Third World: A Study in Cryptodiplomacy. Vikas. ISBN 978-0706912920.
- Becker, Elizabeth (1986). When the War Was Over: The Voices of Cambodia's Revolution and Its People. Simon & Schuster. ISBN 978-0671417871.
- Pilch, Imogen (1988). Prospects for the Neutralisation of Kampuchea. Griffith University. ISBN 978-0868572987.
- US Senate (1970). Documents Relating to the War Power of Congress, the President's Authority as Commander-in-Chief and the War in Indochina. U.S. Government Printing Office.
- Lodha, Sanjay (1997). The Communist Tug-of-war in Indo-China: A Study of the Triangular Relationship Between the Soviet Union, China, and Vietnam (1945-1985). Printwell. ISBN 978-8170444480.
- Tarling, Nicholas, ed. (1992). The Cambridge History of Southeast Asia: Volume 2, The Nineteenth and Twentieth Centuries. Cambridge University Press. ISBN 978-0521355063.
- Seng, Kim (2025). A History of Cambodia. ASIN B0G1NJ87WK.
- Leifer, Michael (1967). Cambodia: The Search for Security. Praeger.
- Jagel, Matthew (2023). Khmer Nationalist: Sơn Ngọc Thành, the CIA, and the Transformation of Cambodia. Cornell University Press. ISBN 978-1501769351.
- Ear, Sophal (1995). Cambodia's Economic Development in Historical Perspective: A Contribution to the Study of Cambodia's Economy. S. Ear.
- Kasuya, Yuko, ed. (2026). Decolonization and Regime Change in Asia: Historical Origins of Democracy and Dictatorship. Hakusuisha. ISBN 978-9819690015.
- Osborne, Milton E. (1973). Politics and Power in Cambodia, the Sihanouk Years. Longman. ISBN 978-0582710412.
- Owen, Norman G., ed. (2004). The Emergence of Modern Southeast Asia: A New History. University of Hawai'i Press. ISBN 978-0824841942.
- Tyner, James A. (2008). The Killing of Cambodia: Geography, Genocide and the Unmaking of Space. Ashgate. ISBN 978-0754670964.
- Marlay, Ross (1999). Patriots and Tyrants: Ten Asian Leaders. Bloomsbury Academic. ISBN 978-0847684427.
- Ayres, David M. (2000). Anatomy of a Crisis: Education, Development, and the State in Cambodia, 1953-1998. University of Hawai'i Press. ISBN 978-0824822385.
- Slocomb, Margaret (2003). The People's Republic of Kampuchea, 1979-1989: The Revolution After Pol Pot. Silkworm Books. ISBN 978-9749575345.
- Banks, William C. (1995). Political Handbook of the World 1994-95. CQ Press.
- Magill, Frank Northen, ed. (1999). Dictionary of World Biography: The 20th century, O-Z. Fitzroy Dearborn Publishers.
- Lentz, Harris M., ed. (2014). Heads of States and Governments Since 1945. Taylor & Francis. ISBN 978-1134264902.
- Tucker, Spencer (1998). Encyclopedia of the Vietnam War: N-Z. ABC-CLIO.
- Who's who in Cambodia. MBN International in partnership with Promo-Khmer. 2005. ISBN 978-2951352407.
- Chandler, David P. (1991). The Tragedy of Cambodian History: Politics, War and Revolutions since 1945. US: Yale University Press. ISBN 0-300-05752-0.
- Chin, Kin Wah (2005). Southeast Asian Affairs. National University of Singapore: Institute of Southeast Asian Studies. ISBN 981-230-306-5.
- Clymer, Kenton (2013). The United States and Cambodia, 1969–2000: A Troubled Relationship. Routledge. ISBN 978-1-134-34156-6.
- Findlay, Trevor (1995). Cambodia – The Legacy and Lessons of UNTAC–SIPRI Research Report No. 9 (PDF). Stockholm International Peace Research Institute. Solna, Sweden: Oxford University Press. ISBN 0-19-829186-8. Archived from the original (PDF) on 5 August 2009.
- Jeldres, Julio A (2003). The Royal House of Cambodia. Phnom Penh: Monument Books. OCLC 54003889.
- Jeldres, Julio A (2005). Volume 1 – Shadows Over Angkor: Memoirs of His Majesty King Norodom Sihanouk of Cambodia. Phnom Penh: Monument Books. ISBN 974-92648-6-X.
- Langguth, A.J. (2000). Our Vietnam The War 1954–1975. Simon & Schuster. ISBN 0743212312.
- Marlay, Ross; Neher, Clark D. (1999). Patriots and Tyrants: Ten Asian Leaders. Lanham, MD: Rowman & Littlefield. ISBN 0-8476-8442-3.
- Mehta, Harish C.; Mehta, Julie B. (2013). Strongman: The Extraordinary Life of Hun Sen. Singapore: Marshall Cavendish International Asia Pte Ltd. ISBN 978-981-4484-60-2.
- Mehta, Harish C. (2001). Warrior Prince: Norodom Ranariddh, Son of King Sihanouk of Cambodia. Singapore: Graham Brash. ISBN 981-218-086-9.
- Narong, Men S. (2007). Who's Who, The Most Influential People in Cambodia. Phnom Penh: Media Business Networks. ISBN 978-99950-66-00-0.
- Osborne, Milton E (1994). Sihanouk Prince of Light, Prince of Darkness. Honolulu: University of Hawaii Press. ISBN 978-0-8248-1639-1.
- Peou, Sorpong (2000). Intervention and Change in Cambodia: Towards Democracy?. National University of Singapore: Institute of Southeast Asian Studies. ISBN 981-230-042-2.
- Sihanouk, Norodom (1973). Burchett, William G. (ed.). My War with the CIA: Cambodia's fight for survival. US: Penguin Books. ISBN 0-14-021689-8.
- Summers, Laura (2003). The Far East and Australasia. New York: Psychology Press. pp. 227–243. ISBN 1-85743-133-2.
- Widyono, Benny (2008). Dancing in Shadows: Sihanouk, the Khmer Rouge, and the United Nations in Cambodia. Lanham, MD: Rowman & Littlefield. ISBN 978-0-7425-5553-2.

=== Reports ===
- Baumgärtel, Tilman (2010). "KON – The Cinema of Cambodia" (PDF). Department of Media and Communication – Royal University of Phnom Penh. Archived from the original (PDF) on 14 July 2015.
- Cohen, Arthur (9 April 1968). "Intelligence Report–Ten Years of Chinese Communist Foreign Policy" (PDF). Central Intelligence Agency. Archived from the original (PDF) on 24 September 2015.
- Jeldres, Julio (September 2012). "A Personal Reflection on Norodom Sihanouk and Zhou Enlai: An Extraordinary Friendship on the Fringes of the Cold War" (PDF). Cross-Currents: East Asian History and Culture Review (4): 53–64. Archived from the original (PDF) on 1 October 2015.
- Kinetz, Erika; Kimsong, Kay; Wasson, Erik; Chan Thul, Prak (31 October 2006). "His Majesty's Norodom Sihanouk's 84th Birthday – A special supplement to The Cambodia Daily" (PDF). The Cambodia Daily. Archived from the original (PDF) on 10 July 2015.
- Scott-Maxwell, Aline (January 2008). "Royal songs and royal singing: Music in the Norodom Sihanouk archival collection, Monash University Library". Fontes Artis Musicae. 5 (1): 180–190. JSTOR 23512420.
- Wemaere, Séverine (managing director) (1 June 2013). "Memory! International Film Heritage Festival" (PDF). Technicolor Film Foundation. Archived from the original (PDF) on 9 July 2015.

Norodom Sihanouk House of Norodom Born: 31 October 1922 Died: 15 October 2012
Regnal titles
Preceded by Sisowath Monivong	King of Cambodia; 1941–1955	Succeeded by Norodom Suramarit
Preceded by Chea Sim (Regent)	King of Cambodia; 1993–2004	Succeeded by Norodom Sihamoni
Political offices
Preceded by New office	Prime Minister of Cambodia; 1945	Succeeded by Son Ngoc Thanh
Preceded by Yem Sambaur	Prime Minister of Cambodia; 1950	Succeeded by Sisowath Monipong
Preceded by Huy Kanthoul	Prime Minister of Cambodia; 1952–1953	Succeeded by Penn Nouth
Preceded by Chan Nak	Prime Minister of Cambodia; 1954	Succeeded by Penn Nouth
Preceded by Leng Ngeth	Prime Minister of Cambodia; 1955–1956	Succeeded by Oum Chheang Sun
Preceded by Oum Chheang Sun	Prime Minister of Cambodia; 1956	Succeeded by Khim Tit
Preceded by Khim Tit	Prime Minister of Cambodia; 1956	Succeeded by San Yun
Preceded by San Yun	Prime Minister of Cambodia; 1957	Succeeded by Sim Var
Preceded by Sim Var	Prime Minister of Cambodia; 1958–1960	Succeeded by Pho Proeung
Preceded by Chuop Hell	Head of State of Cambodia; 1960–1970	Succeeded by Cheng Heng
Preceded by Penn Nouth	Prime Minister of Cambodia; 1961–1962	Succeeded by Nhiek Tioulong
Preceded by Sak Sutsakhan	President of the State Presidium; 1975–1976	Succeeded by Khieu Samphan
