= Leng Ngeth =

14th Prime Minister of Cambodia

- ឡេង ង៉ែត
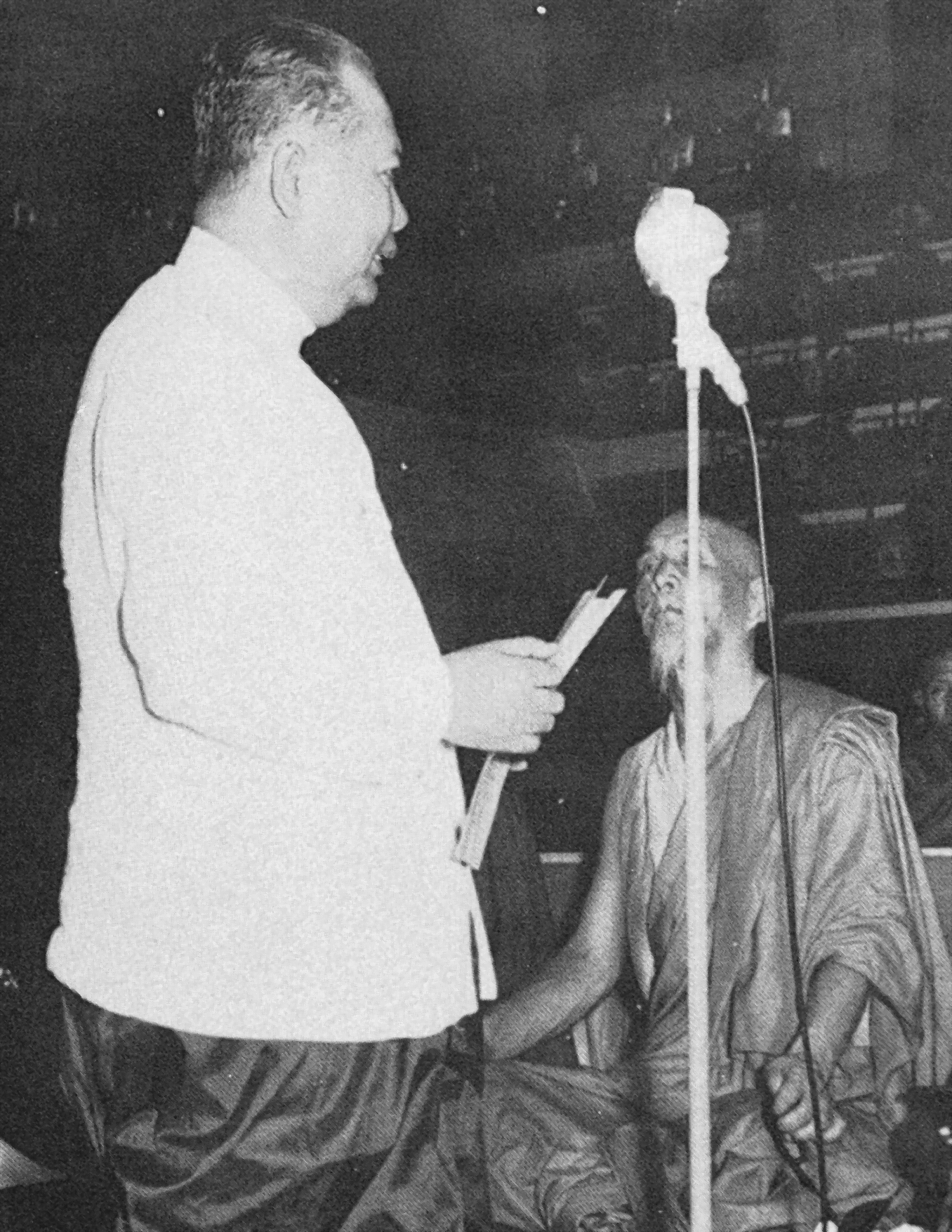
- Ngeth in 1955

Prime Minister of Cambodia
- In office 26 January 1955 – 3 October 1955
- Monarchs: Norodom Suramarit; Norodom Sihanouk
- Preceded by: Penn Nouth
- Succeeded by: Norodom Sihanouk

Personal details
- Born: 1900 Phnom Penh, Cambodia, French Indochina
- Died: 1975 (aged 74–75) Kampuchea
- Party: Democratic Party

Leng Ngeth (Khmer: ឡេង ង៉ែត; 1900 – 1975) was a Cambodian politician who served as the prime minister of Cambodia from January to October 1955. From 1958 to 1962 he was ambassador in Beijing. In 1975, the Khmer Rouge on the orders of Angkar captured Ngeth by the CPK's forces which was sent by their leaders such as Pol Pot and Khieu Samphan at the dead of night and executed.
