= Mardochée =

Mardochée is a given name. Notable people with the name include:

- Mardochee Nzita (born 2000), Democratic Republic of the Congo footballer
- Mardochée Valabrègue (1852–1934), French officer
- Mardochée Venture (c. 1730–1789), French Judaic scholar
