= Hor Namhong =

Cambodian politician

Samdech Issara Wites Panha Hor Namhong
- ហោ ណាំហុង
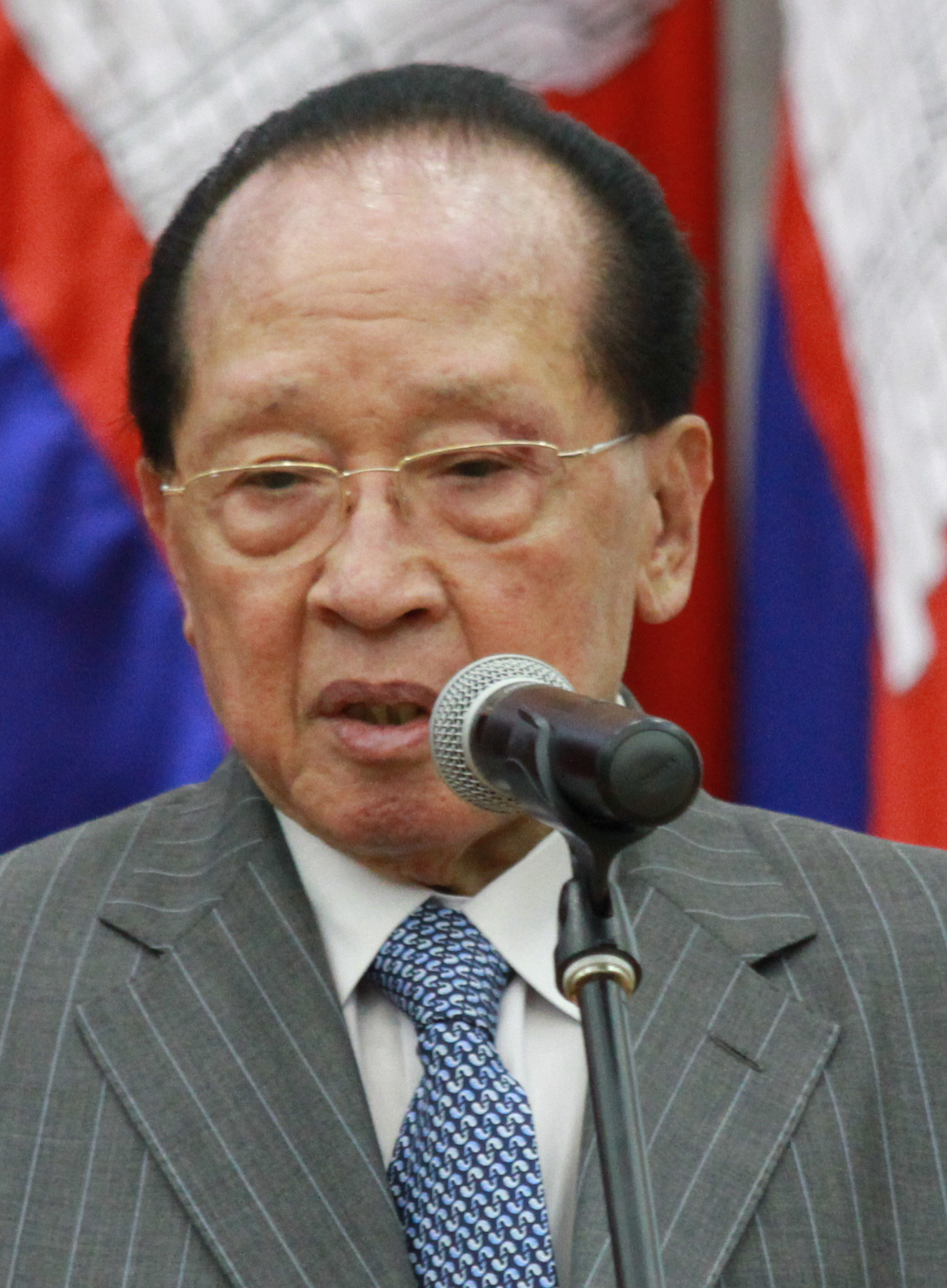
- Namhong in 2015

Member of the Supreme Privy Council to His Majesty the King
- Monarch: Norodom Sihamoni

Deputy Prime Minister of Cambodia
- In office 16 July 2004 – 22 August 2023
- Monarch: Norodom Sihamoni
- Prime Minister: Hun Sen

Minister of Foreign Affairs and International Cooperation
- In office 30 November 1998 – 4 April 2016
- Prime Minister: Hun Sen
- Preceded by: Ung Huot
- Succeeded by: Prak Sokhonn
- In office 1990–1993
- Prime Minister: Hun Sen
- Preceded by: Hun Sen
- Succeeded by: Norodom Sirivudh

Member of Parliament for Kampong Cham
- In office 25 November 1998 – 29 July 2018

Personal details
- Born: 15 November 1935 (age 90) Phnom Penh, Cambodia, French Indochina
- Party: Cambodian People's Party
- Children: 5
- Education: École royale d'administration European Institute of High International Studies; University of Paris
- Profession: Politician, diplomat

Hor Namhong GCC GOM (Khmer: ហោ ណាំហុង, Haô Nămhŏng [hao nam.hong]; born 15 November 1935) is a Member of the Supreme Privy Council to His Majesty the King of Cambodia since 2023. He is also a member of the Cambodian People's Party and has been a Deputy Prime Minister since 2004. He served as a Cambodian diplomat who served in the government of Cambodia as Minister of Foreign Affairs from 1990 to 1993 and again from 1998 to 2016. He also served as Cambodia's foreign minister for a combined tenure of 20 years. His official title is Samdech Issara Wites Panha Hor Namhong (Khmer: សម្ដេចឥស្សរវិទេសបញ្ញា ហោ ណាំហុង).

== Early life and education ==
Born at Phnom Penh, Hor Namhong was educated at the École royale d'administration (diplomatic section) in Cambodia. He holds a Master of Law degree from the Faculty of Law in Paris and a diploma from the European Institute of High International Studies in France.

== Early career ==
Between 1967 and 1973 Hor Namhong served at the Embassy of Cambodia in Paris, which became the mission of the exiled Royal Government of National Union of Kampuchea (GRUNK) in 1970. Between 1973 and 1975 he represented Cambodia as ambassador to Cuba.

== Boeng Trabek prison camp ==
Between 1975 and 1979 Hor Namhong claims to have been a prisoner of the Khmer Rouge at Boeng Trabek. There have been accusations that he collaborated with his captors but Hor Namhong denies the accusations and was successful in a defamation suit against his accusers. On April 27, 2011, Hor Namhong lost a defamation suit in the French Supreme Court in which he claimed he was innocent of atrocities committed during the Khmer Rouge regime from 1975 through 1979.

In July 2011 Namhong lodged a protest with United States officials regarding a leaked diplomatic cable. The undated cable claimed that Namhong "became head of the Beng Trabek (sic) camp and he and his wife collaborated in the killing of many prisoners."

== Subsequent career ==
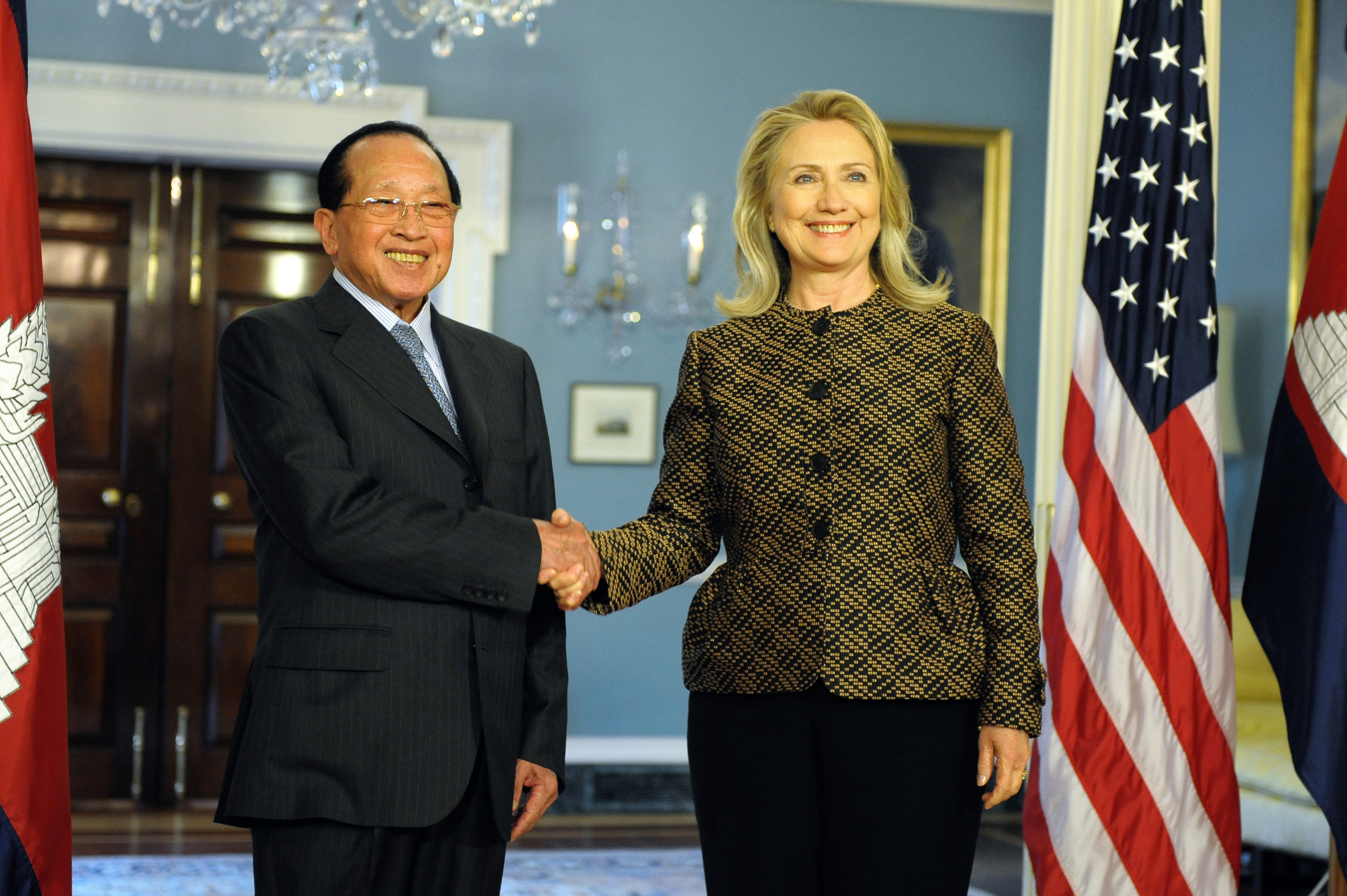
Namhong shaking hands with US Secretary of State Hillary Clinton at the Department of State in Washington, D.C., on 12 June 2012.

In 1980, following the fall of the Khmer Rouge, Hor Namhong joined the government as Vice Minister of Foreign Affairs. In 1982 he was appointed as ambassador to the Soviet Union, a post which he held until 1989. In 1989 he returned to Cambodia as Minister of the Council of Ministers in charge of Foreign Affairs. In 1990 he was appointed Minister of Foreign Affairs and in 1991 became a member of the Supreme National Council of Cambodia.

Between 1987 and 1991 Hor Namhong was one of the key negotiators in the peace talks to end the "Cambodia Conflict". In October 1991 he was a signatory of the Paris Peace Agreement.

In 1993 he returned to the diplomatic corps as ambassador to France. In 1998 he returned to government as a Member of the National Assembly and Minister of Foreign Affairs and International Cooperation. In 2004, in addition to his position as foreign minister, he was appointed a deputy prime minister.

He retired from his post as foreign minister on 4 April 2016 after 17 years in office, though remained as a deputy prime minister. He was the longest serving Cambodian foreign minister.

== Personal life ==
Hor Namhong is married, having five children. His eldest son, Hor Sothoun, is Permanent Secretary General of the Ministry of Foreign Affairs and International Cooperation and his two other sons serve as ambassadors: Hor Nambora as Ambassador to the United Kingdom and Hor Monirath as Ambassador to Japan (current Secretary of State of the Ministry of Tourism).

== Awards ==
=== National ===
- Grand Cross of the Royal Order of Cambodia
- Grand Officer of the Royal Order of Monisaraphon

=== Foreign ===
- Grand Officer of the National Ordre du Mérite (France)
- Grand Cross of the Most Exalted Order of the White Elephant (Thailand)

Political offices
Preceded by Ung Huot	Minister of Foreign Affairs and International Cooperation; 1998–2016	Succeeded by Prak Sokhon
