= Jayathma Wickramanayake =

Sri Lankan activist

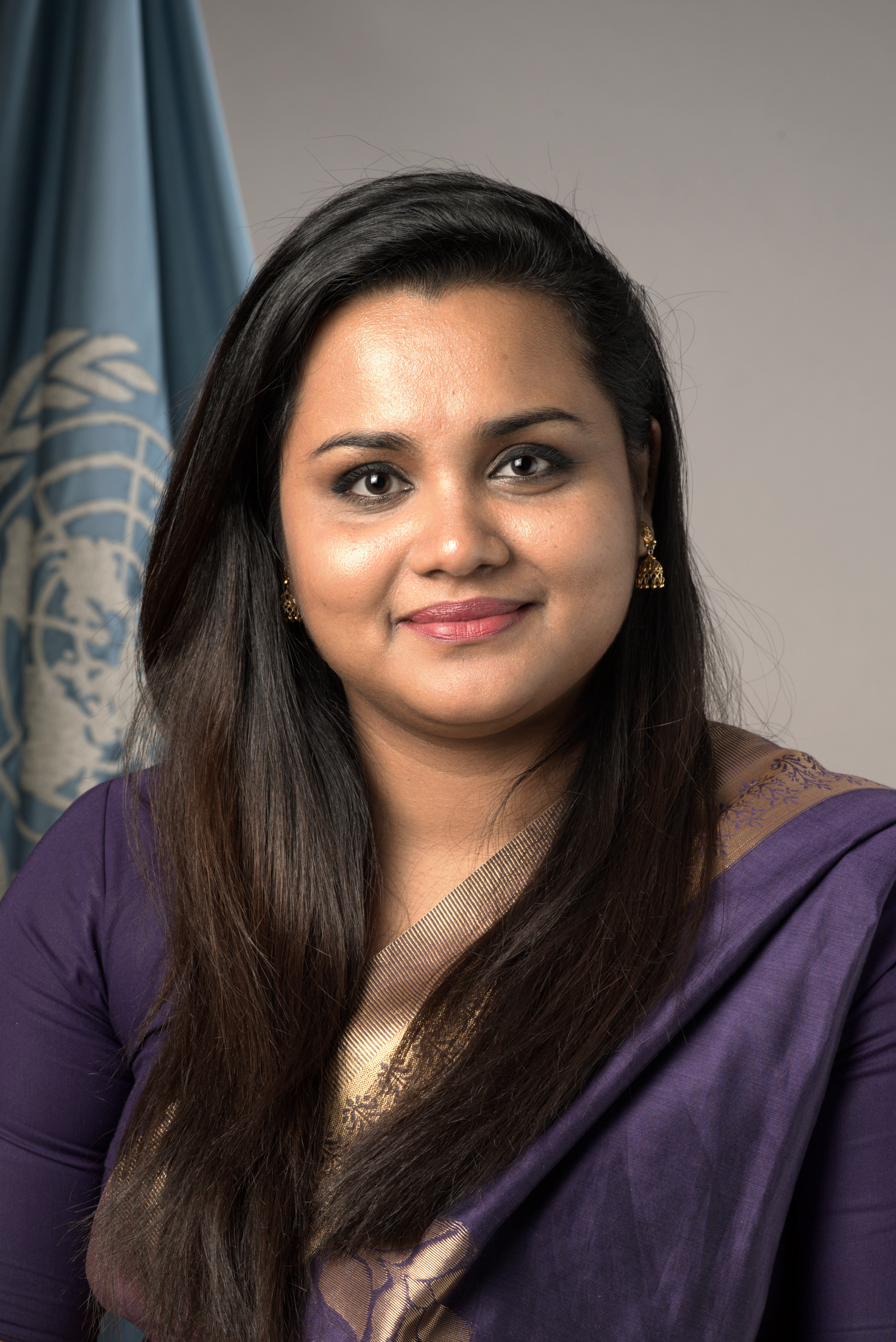
- Wickramanayake at the UN

UN Women Senior Policy Advisor
- Incumbent
- Assumed office 17 July 2017
- Appointed by: António Guterres
- Preceded by: Ahmad Alhendawi

Personal details
- Born: 22 November 1990 (age 35) Bentota, Sri Lanka
- Education: Visakha Vidyalaya
- Known for: Human Rights Activism

Jayathma Wickramanayake (born 22 November 1990) is a Sri Lankan born international civil servant who currently serves a Senior Policy Advisor at UN Women. She previously served as the United Nations Secretary-General's Envoy on Youth. Appointed by the United Nations Secretary-General António Guterres in June 2017, she succeeded Ahmad Alhendawi of Jordan, who served as the first Envoy on Youth from 2013 to 2017.

Prior to taking her role as the Envoy, Wickramanayake led youth development efforts both on an international and national level in her home country, Sri Lanka. In this regard, she co-founded the youth organization Hashtag Generation, aimed at increasing the civic and political engagement of Sri Lankan young people, particularly young women. Wickramanayake also served as the country's first-ever Youth Delegate and actively participated in the establishment of World Youth Skills Day.

== Early life and education ==
Jayathma Wickramanayake was born in the coastal town of Bentota in Sri Lanka. She graduated with a bachelor's degree in science from the University of Colombo. While at university, Wickramanayake became the runner-up in the first competition organized by the Sri Lankan Ministry of Youth Affairs to select emerging young leaders in the country.

== Professional career ==
In 2012, Wickramanayake was selected as the country's first-ever Youth Delegate to the United Nations and took part in the United Nations 67th General Assembly. As she was finishing her tenure as Youth Delegate in 2013, Wickramanayake was appointed as a member and youth lead negotiator of the International Youth Task Force of the World Youth Conference 2014, hosted by Sri Lanka. In this capacity, she advised on the conference's programme, agenda, proceedings and declaration. Building on the outcomes of the conference, Wickramanayake also played a key role in mainstreaming youth concerns in the Post-2015 Development Agenda and in recognizing July 15 as the World Youth Skills Day, a proposal of Sri Lanka to the 69th UN General Assembly.

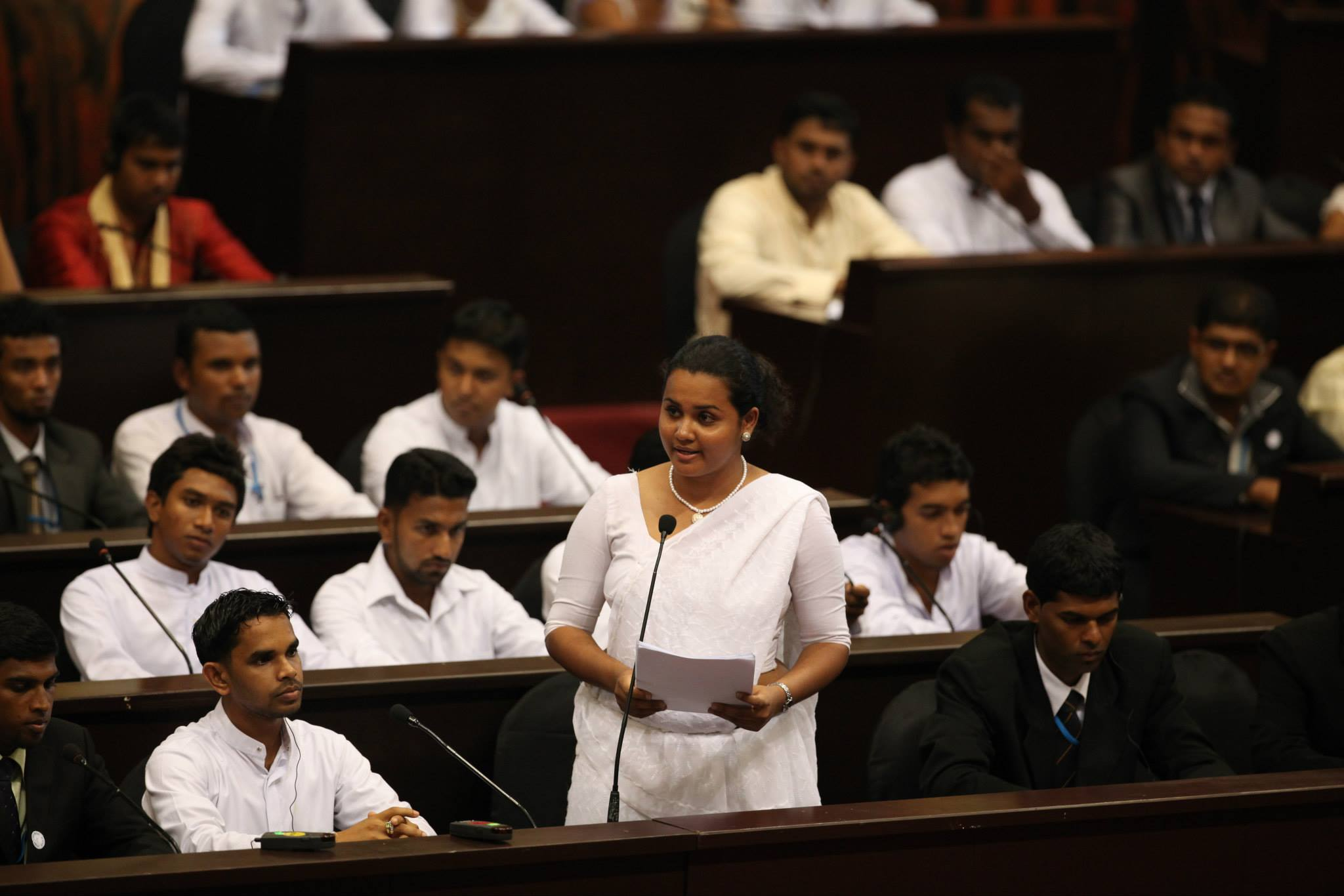
Wickramanayake addressing the Sri Lankan Youth Parliament to welcome the then UN High Commissioner for Human Rights, Navaneethem Pillay

Later on, Wickramanayake went on to become a Senator in the Sri Lankan Youth Parliament (2013-2015) and Project Officer at the One-Text Initiative (OTI), which focuses on building political consensus and post-war reconciliation in the country. She also served as Secretary to the Secretary-General of the Parliament of Sri Lanka (2016-2017). Prior to taking the role of the United Nations Secretary-General's Envoy on Youth, Wickramanayake was working as an Officer of the Sri Lanka Administrative Service.

=== Hashtag Generation ===
Wickramanayake started the grassroots youth organization Hashtag Generation together with three other former Sri Lankan UN Youth Delegates. The goal of this project is to build the capacity of young people, particularly young women, to participate in politics in the country. One of the initiatives undertaken by Hashtag Generation is We Govern Sri Lanka, which uses ICT to empower women in politics.

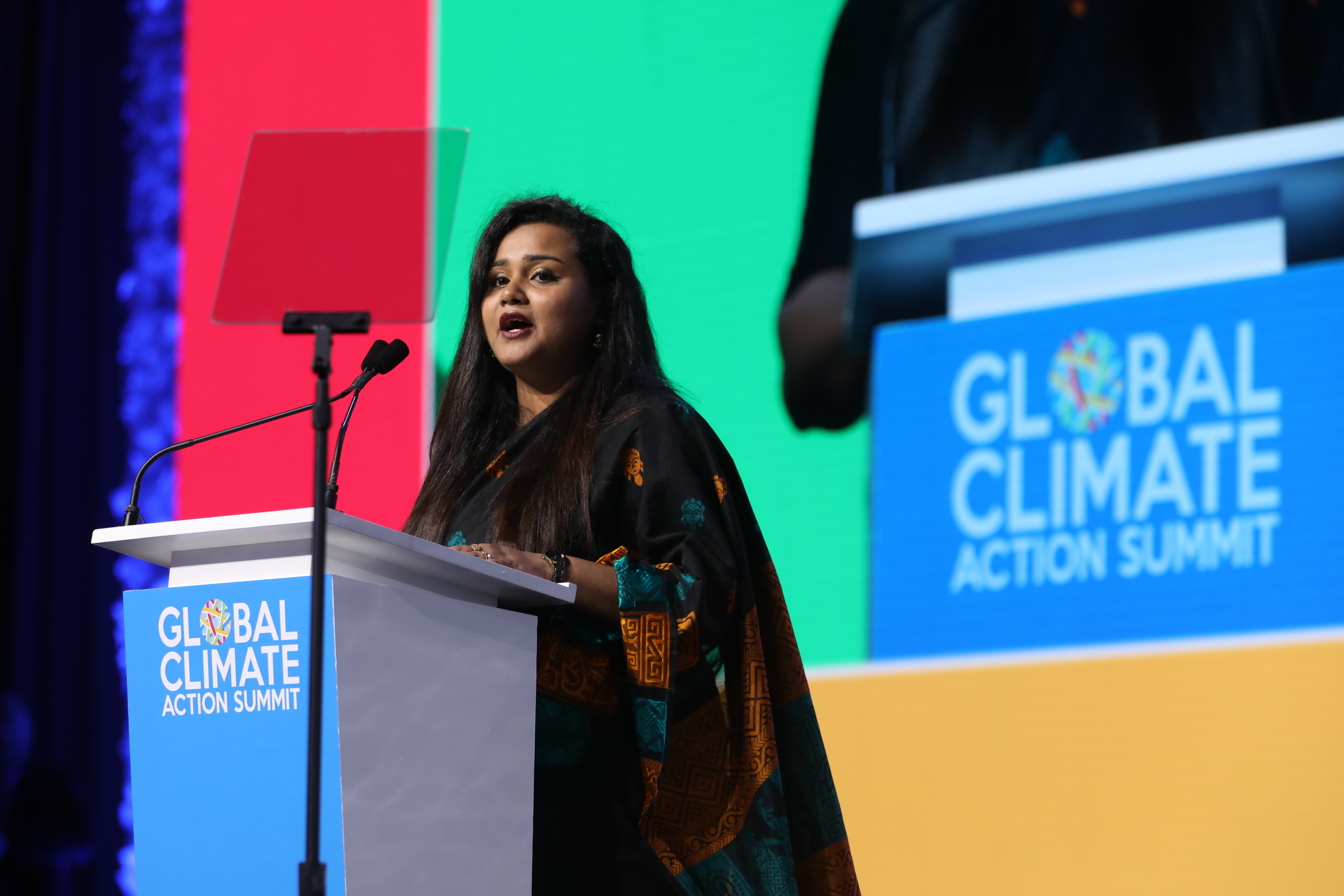
United Nations Secretary-General’s Envoy on Youth Wickramanayake speaking at the Global Climate Action Summit 2018

=== Role as Secretary-General's Envoy on Youth ===
Wickramanayake was appointed the United Nations Secretary-General's Envoy on Youth in June 2017. In this role, she works to expand the engagement, participation and advocacy efforts of youth across the four main pillars of the work of the United Nations: development, human rights, peace and security and humanitarian action. One of her goals as the Envoy on Youth is “to ensure that young people have a voice in all these processes at the UN”, while bringing the UN closer to young people at the same time. She has also stressed the “need to see young people not as a liability but as an opportunity, and to see how we can proactively engage them in all discussions, at all levels”. In November 2019 She was included in the Time magazines next 100 world leaders list.

Wickramanayake also serves as a representative and advisor to the United Nations Secretary-General in her capacity as the Envoy on Youth.
