= Ahmad Alhendawi =

Jordanian activist

Ahmad Alhendawi أحمد الهنداوي
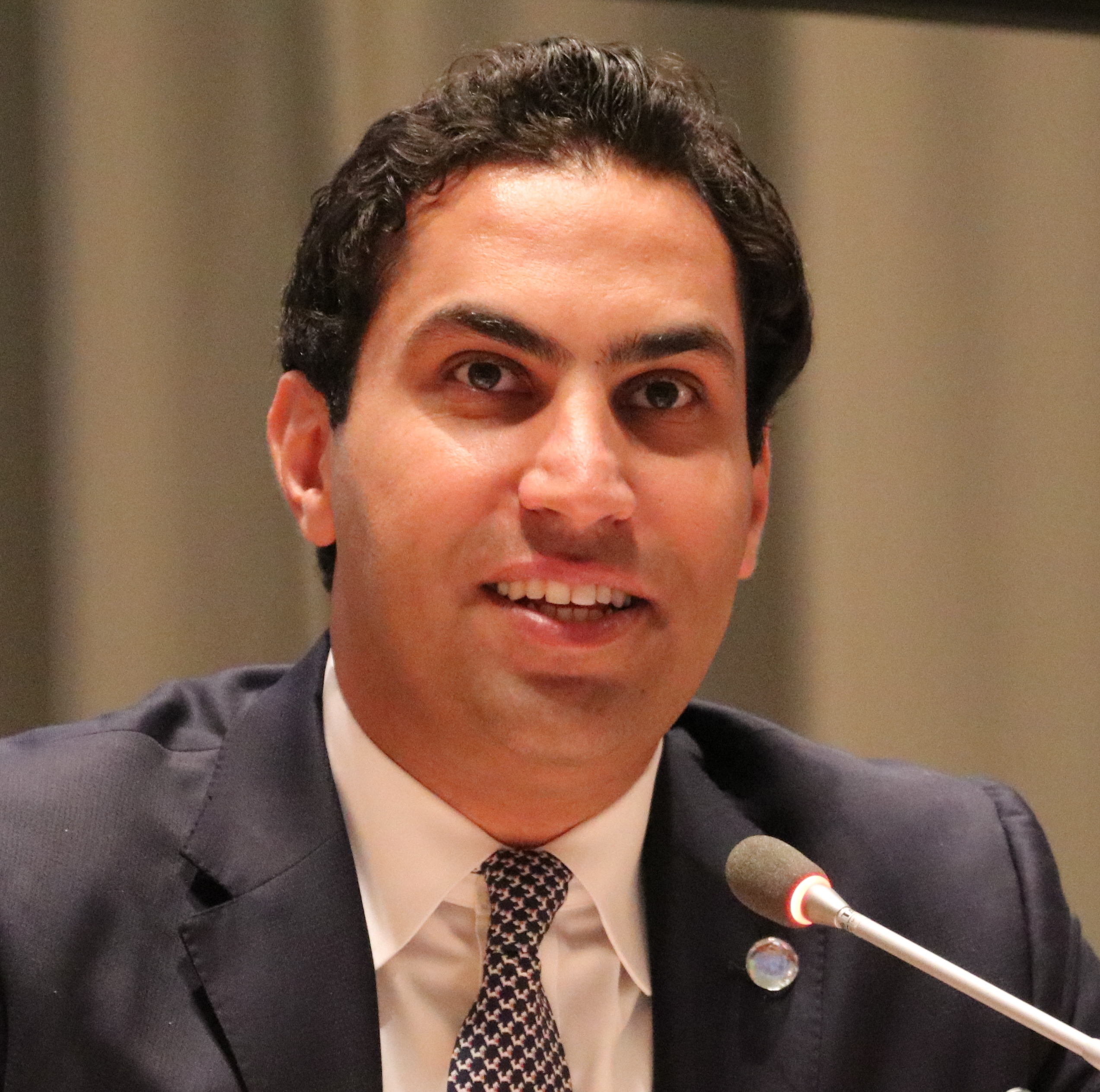
- Ahmad Alhendawi

Secretary General of the World Organization of the Scout Movement
- In office March 2017 – 31 October 2024
- Preceded by: Scott Teare
- Succeeded by: David Berg

Personal details
- Born: May 20, 1984 (age 42) Al Zarqa, Jordan
- Children: 1
- Education: Institut Européen in Nice; Centre International de Formation Européenne; Al-Balqa` Applied University
- Profession: Administrator

Ahmad Alhendawi (Arabic: أحمد الهنداوي; born 20 May 1984) is a Jordanian public administrator and a former United Nations official who served as the Secretary General of the World Organization of the Scout Movement (WOSM) from March 2017 until October 2024, making him the youngest person to hold this position in the 117-year history of the organization. Prior to this, he was the first-ever United Nations Secretary-General's Envoy on Youth, appointed by the Secretary-General of the United Nations on January 17, 2013. In this role, he supported UN Secretary-General Ban Ki-moon in addressing his thematic priority of working with and for young people as part of his Five-Year Action Agenda.

Hailing from Jordan, Alhendawi has extensive experience working on development issues at the local, regional, and international levels. He has held positions in various national and international organizations and has also initiated his own initiatives.

== Early life and education ==
Alhendawi was born in Zarqa, Jordan. He holds a master's degree in Advanced European and International Relations from the Institut Européen in Nice, France. He also earned a Diploma in European and International Organisations from the Centre International de Formation Européenne (CIFE) and a bachelor's degree in Computer Information Systems from Al-Balqa` Applied University.

== Early career ==
Alhendawi's career began with roles in humanitarian and development organizations. He worked at the national level on local NGOs focusing on governance and democratic participation. He later joined UNFPA-Iraq and the Emergency Programme of Save the Children, responding to the humanitarian emergency in Iraq. Later, he transitioned to sustainable development work at the regional level as a Policy Advisor at the League of Arab States and UNFPA, and later at a World Bank-funded program as Team Leader supporting the Arab League Institutional Development. As part of his voluntary work, Alhendawi was among the co-founders of the All Jordan Youth Commission and the International Youth Council in New York. He also co-founded and headed the Youth for Democracy Network at the Jordanian Commission for Democratic Culture.

== Secretary-General's Envoy on Youth ==
In 2013, Alhendawi became the first-ever United Nations Secretary-General's Envoy on Youth. In this role, he established the new office and developed its programmatic, financial, and political mandate. His efforts significantly transformed the UN's approach to youth development, including coordinating initiatives like the adoption of the historic Youth, Peace, and Security Agenda by the Security Council.

As Envoy on Youth, he developed the ECOSOC Youth Forum, now serving as the premier platform for advancing the youth agenda within the UN framework. He championed youth rights advocacy, particularly focusing on marginalized groups, young women, and girls, ensuring their voices were heard and their needs addressed on a global scale. Representing the UN Secretary-General in over 100 field missions worldwide, he supported high-stakes crisis situations and assisted country teams in conflict zones. He fostered strong connections between the UN and civil society organizations, driving forward the youth agenda. Additionally, he developed robust networks with governments, international bodies, and civil society organizations, leveraging these connections to support child and youth-focused initiatives.

Alhendawi is a firm believer in the Sustainable Development Goals (SDGs) and believes with the right investments in young people, they can contribute significantly towards attaining the goals. He's also contributed to the consolidation of peace efforts in places like Jordan, which led to the adoption of the Amman Youth Declaration on Youth, Peace and Security.

== Secretary General for World Organization of the Scout Movement ==
Alhendawi began his involvement in Scouting at the age of 13 when he joined the local branch of the Jordanian Association for Boy Scouts and Girl Guides. He has maintained an interest and involvement in youth support, the Scouting movement, and non-formal education throughout his career.

Ahmad Alhendawi succeeded Scott Teare in March 2017 as the Secretary-General of the World Organization of the Scout Movement (WOSM). Under his leadership, the World Scout Movement experienced significant growth, reaching a record number of 57 million members and expanding Scouting to 17 new countries. He has been instrumental in forming new strategic partnerships and securing resources to support the organization's mission.

During his tenure, Alhendawi led the restructuring of global and regional offices, optimizing efficiency and service delivery to the worldwide membership. He led the development of a comprehensive safeguarding mechanism to ensure global compliance with child protection standards. Additionally, he pioneered WOSM Services, a comprehensive suite of 13 support areas powered by an advanced digital platform, e-learnings, on-site technical assistance, and funding opportunities. To date, over 950 services have been delivered with a 95% satisfaction rate.

Alhendawi also championed the alignment of the Scout Movement with the Sustainable Development Goals (SDGs) through the "Scouts for SDGs" initiative, facilitating the delivery and tracking of 4 billion hours of community service towards SDG objectives by 2030. He supported the management of an endowment through the World Scout Foundation. Furthermore, he co-convened and chaired a coalition of six leading youth-serving organizations (IFRC, YMCA, YWCA, WOSM, WAGGGS, and The International Award) as part of the Global Youth Mobilization, in partnership with the EU, WHO, and the UN Foundation, to amplify youth and children voices and drive global impact through a global youth fund.

Through these initiatives, Alhendawi has significantly advanced the reach and impact of the World Scout Movement, aligning its efforts with global development goals and enhancing its support infrastructure for national organizations.

== Other Roles ==
Alhendawi serves as trustee on several boards, including the International Board of the World Wide Fund for Nature (WWF), the Ban Ki-moon Centre for Global Citizens, and the Crown Prince Foundation in Jordan, among other volunteer and board roles.

== Publications ==
Alhendawi had several papers and publications on youth and civil society, including co-authoring:

- "Working With Youth in the MENA Region, an Introductory Guide to NGO programming in Support of the Inclusion of Youth" Published by the Danish Youth Council
- The Role of Civil Society in the Arab Spring: A comparison between the role of social movements and NGOs in the Egyptian uprising.

== Awards and Recognitions ==
- Recipient of HM King Abdullah II ibn Al Hussein Order for Distinction
- The Millennium Campus Network's Global Generation Award in 2013
- Global Youth Action Net Fellowship as a Young Global Social Entrepreneur by the International Youth Foundation in Washington DC.
- Named by The Diplomatic Courier as a Top 99 under 33 Shaper.
- Recognized by Arabian Business as one of "the 100 Most Powerful Arabs under 40" and "100 Most Influential Young Arabs in the World".
- Awarded the Silver World Award a distinguished service award of the Boy Scouts of America (BSA).

== Personal life ==
A Jordanian national, Ahmad Alhendawi is married and has one daughter. He has lived and worked in various countries, including Jordan, Iraq, Egypt, Turkey, France, Germany, the United States, and Malaysia, gaining extensive international experience and a diverse cultural perspective.

World Organization of the Scout Movement
Preceded by Scott Teare	Secretary General; 2017 -	Incumbent
