= Royal Order of Cambodia =

Cambodian order of chivalry

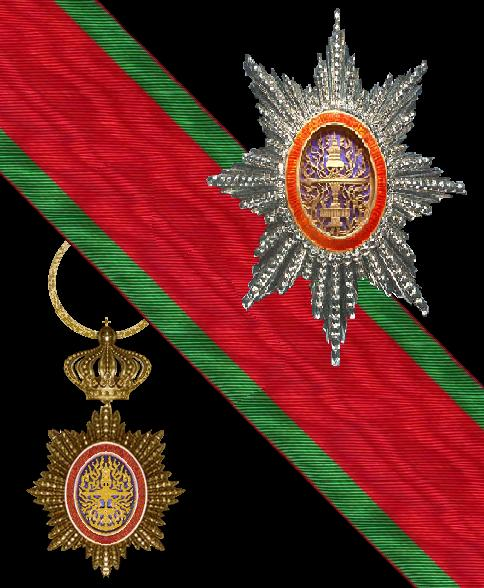
- Star, medal and current Great Ribbon of the Order

Awarded by King of Cambodia
- Type: Order
- Established: 8 February 1864; 1864 – 1955 (Order of the French Protectorate of Cambodia); 1908 – present (as Royal Order of Cambodia)
- Status: Currently constituted
- Sovereign: Norodom Sihamoni
- Grades: Knight Grand Cross; Knight Grand Officer; Knight Commander; Officer; Knight

Precedence
- Next (higher): Grand Order of National Merit
- Ribbon of the Order

The Royal Order of Cambodia (Khmer: គ្រឿងឥស្សរិយយសព្រះរាជាណាចក្រកម្ពុជា, romanized: Krœăng Ĕssârĭyôyôs Preăh Réachéanachâkr Kâmpŭchéa; French: Ordre royal du Cambodge) was a colonial order of chivalry of French Cambodia, and is still in use as an order of chivalry in the present-day Kingdom of Cambodia.

== History ==
=== Colonialism ===
On 8 February 1864, the king founded the Royal Order of Cambodia as an order of merit with five degrees. After 1896, the French government and the kings of Cambodia each granted themselves the Order of Cambodia. The French president was rightly Grand Cross in the Royal Order of Cambodia. The order served to distinguish civilians and soldiers, subjects of the king or strangers, who had made themselves worthy. In 1896, the order was officially taken up in the French system of colonial orders of chivalry.

For French appointments, the recipient had to be at least 29 years old and enter the Order first as a knight, to be promoted to a higher grade after a certain period. Only officers of the Légion d'honneur could become a commander in the Order and only commanders of the Légion d'honneur could be Commanders or Officers of the Order. Apart from decorations for bravery or merit during foreign campaigns, the French colonial orders also required that a certain number of years had to have been spent in the tropics or overseas to be eligible - in this case, three years in Indochina, preferably in Cambodia. From 1933 the Order was also granted for the organization of exhibitions dedicated to Cambodia and sacred events important to the French colonies. None of these rules applied for grants by the King of Cambodia himself.

The colonial and overseas orders were immediately contingent on the French orders and awarded on ministerial orders. Those awarded it not only had to pay for their own registration and qualifications, but also had to buy their own insignia.

=== Post-colonial ===
In 1948 France ceased granting the order. Formally it remained a French colonial policy, but it was now only granted by the King of Cambodia. The order has since then been one of the historical orders of France.

On September 1, 1950, the (colonial) French order-system was reformed. The Order of the Star of Anjouan and the Order of the Black Star were formalised as French Overseas Orders. The other three were the "Order of States Associated to the French Union" (French: "Ordre des États de l'Union Française Associés"). In 1955, Cambodia became independent. The order was approved by King Norodom Sihanouk during his government and also granted during his exile in Beijing.

The order became dormant in 1975, under the government of Democratic Kampuchea. Following United Nations supported elections in 1993, H.M. King Norodom Sihanouk, was returned to the throne and the Order was reinstituted by Royal Decree No. 1095/01 dated 5 October 1995. This decree was signed by Chea Sim as the King's representative, Norodom Ranariddh, the First Prime Minister and Hun Sen, the Second Prime Minister at the time. A few design changes took place. After the restoration of the Khmer dynasty it remained the highest Cambodian distinction. The original French type crown has been replaced by the Khmer Royal Crown.

== Grades ==
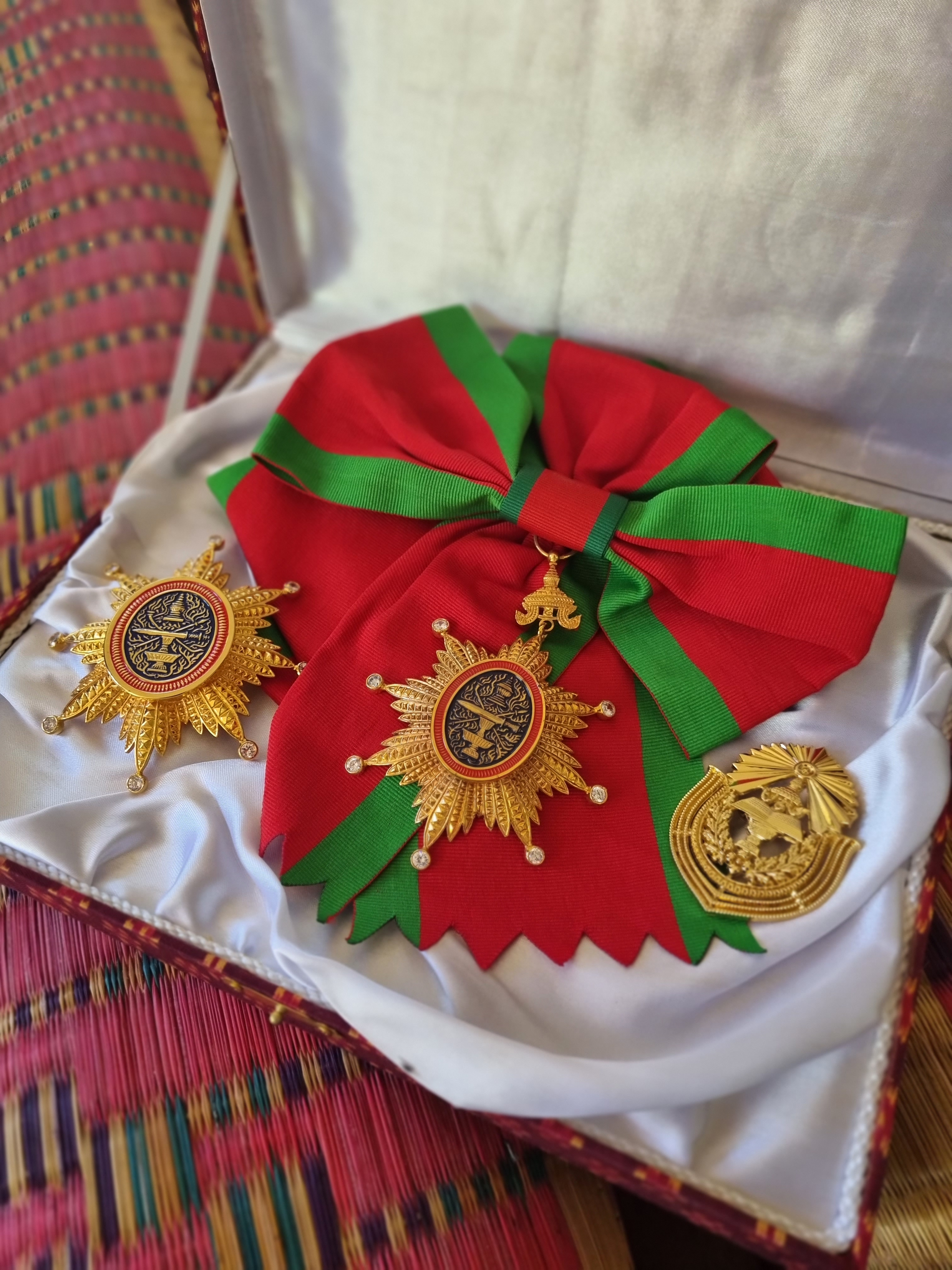
Current Knight Grand Cross

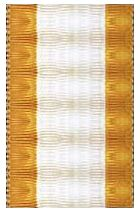
Ribbon during the colonial period (1899–1948).

=== Since 1948 ===
The five classes of appointment to the Order are, in descending order of precedence:

1. Maha Sirivaddha (មហាសេរីវឌ្ឍន៍) or Knight Grand Cross
2. Mahasena (មហាសេនា) or Knight Grand Officer
3. Dhipadinda (ធិបឌិន្ទ) or Knight Commander
4. Sena (សេនា) or Knight Officer
5. Assarariddhi (អស្សឫទ្ធិ) or Knight or Chevalier

=== Prior to 1948 ===
The five classes of appointment to the Order are, in descending order of precedence:

1. Maha Sirivaddha (មហាសេរីវឌ្ឍន៍) or Knight Grand Cross
2. Mahasena (មហាសេនា) or Knight Grand Officer
3. Dhipadinda (ធិបឌិន្ទ) or Knight Commander
4. Sena (សេនា) or Knight Officer
5. Assarariddhi (អស្សឫទ្ធិ) or Knight or Chevalier

Members of all classes of the order are assigned positions in the order of precedence. The highest level of the Knight Grand Cross relates to refinement. Those honored in this way are raised to the personal, non-hereditary status of nobility and henceforth bear the title His or Her Excellence (H.E.). This is prefixed to the full name.

== Insignia ==
The medal of the order comes in many different forms, as a slightly elongated silver or gold star surmounted by a Cambodian crown and with an image of the king's crown and coat of arms in gold on a violet blue background and surrounded by a red circle. The reverse of the medal is left rough. To promote the order if it was awarded by the French, the Cambodian crown was replaced with a European one surmounted by a small cross, and in the early years the order was even awarded without any crown.

The central image on the star of the order is the same as the medal, though the crown is missing and the rays are usually smooth. The star is elongated, with the vertical rays longer than the horizontal rays. The regalia of Knights is in silver, whilst those of the higher grades are gold. The medal and star are equally for civilians and soldiers. The ribbon of the order was originally green with a red border, changing in 1899 to white with an orange border (in the same year the French government changed the colours of the ribbons of all five colonial orders), before reverting to the original black ribbon when it became a purely Cambodian order again.

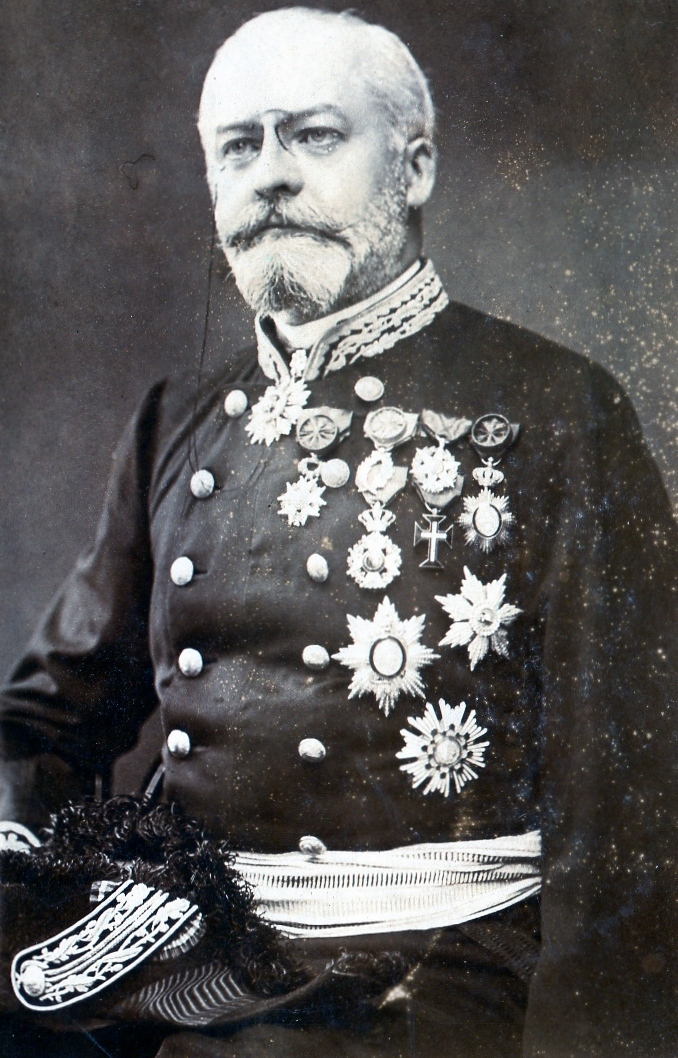
Gabriel Bouffet in full State Councillor's regalia.

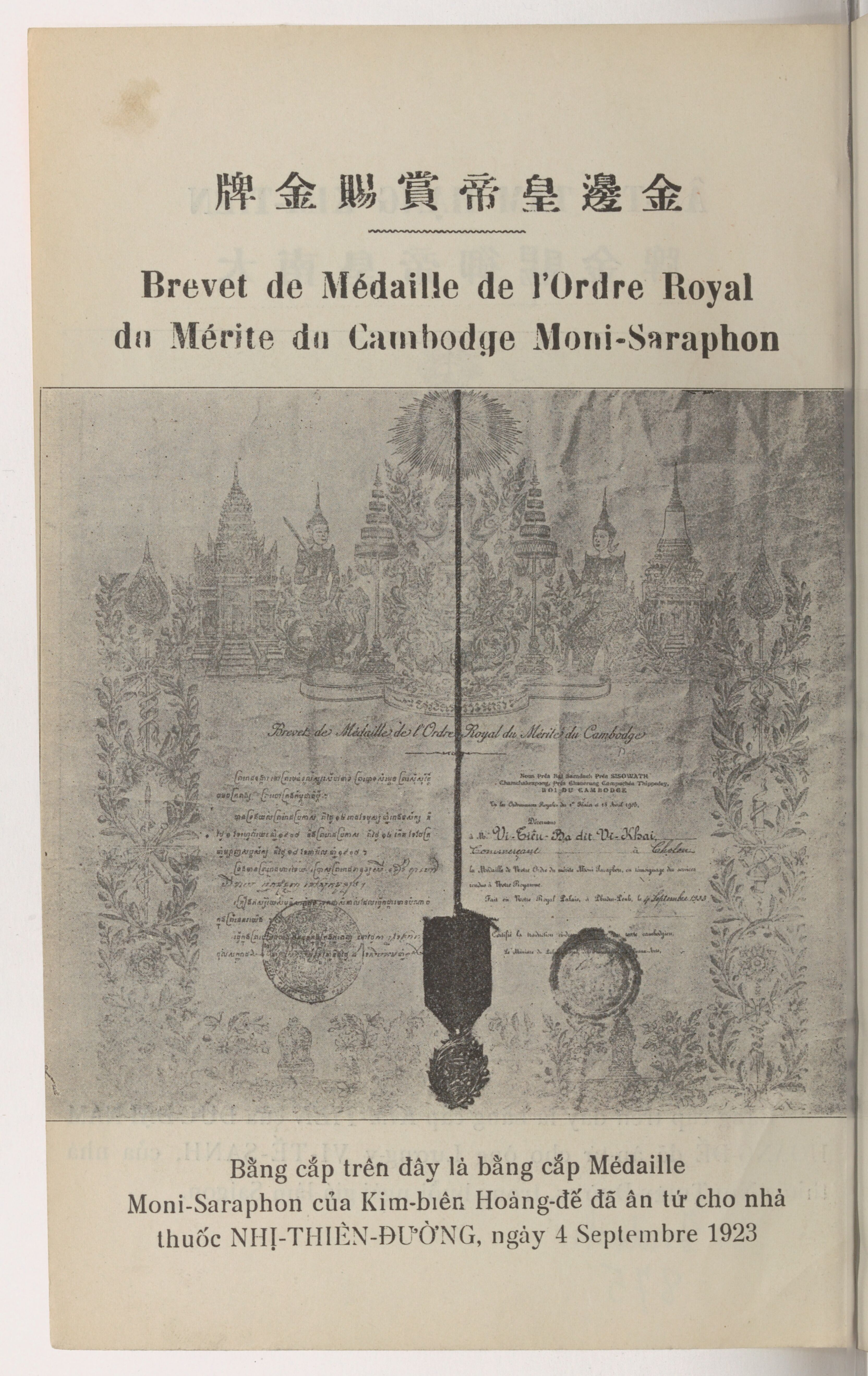
Brevet de Médaille de l'Ordre Royal du Mérite du Cambodge Moni-Saraphon.

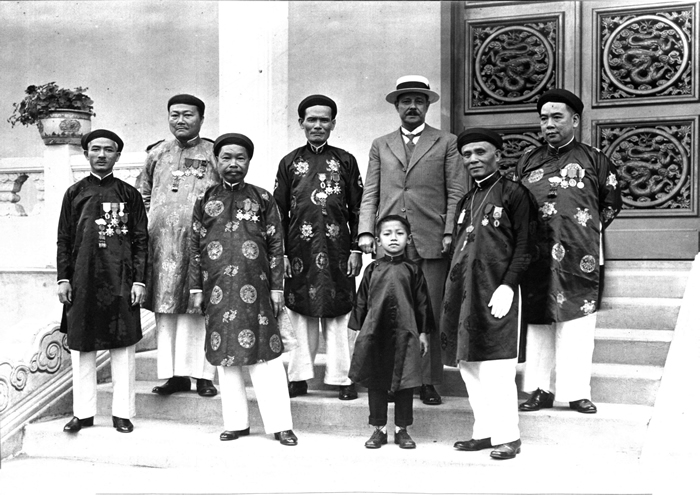
The Decorations of a Group of Mandarins with among which: Cambodian Royal Order of Moniseraphon.

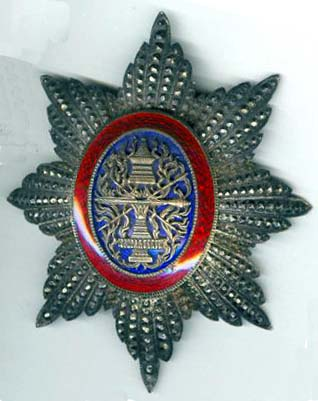
Cross of the Order of Cambodia until 1948.

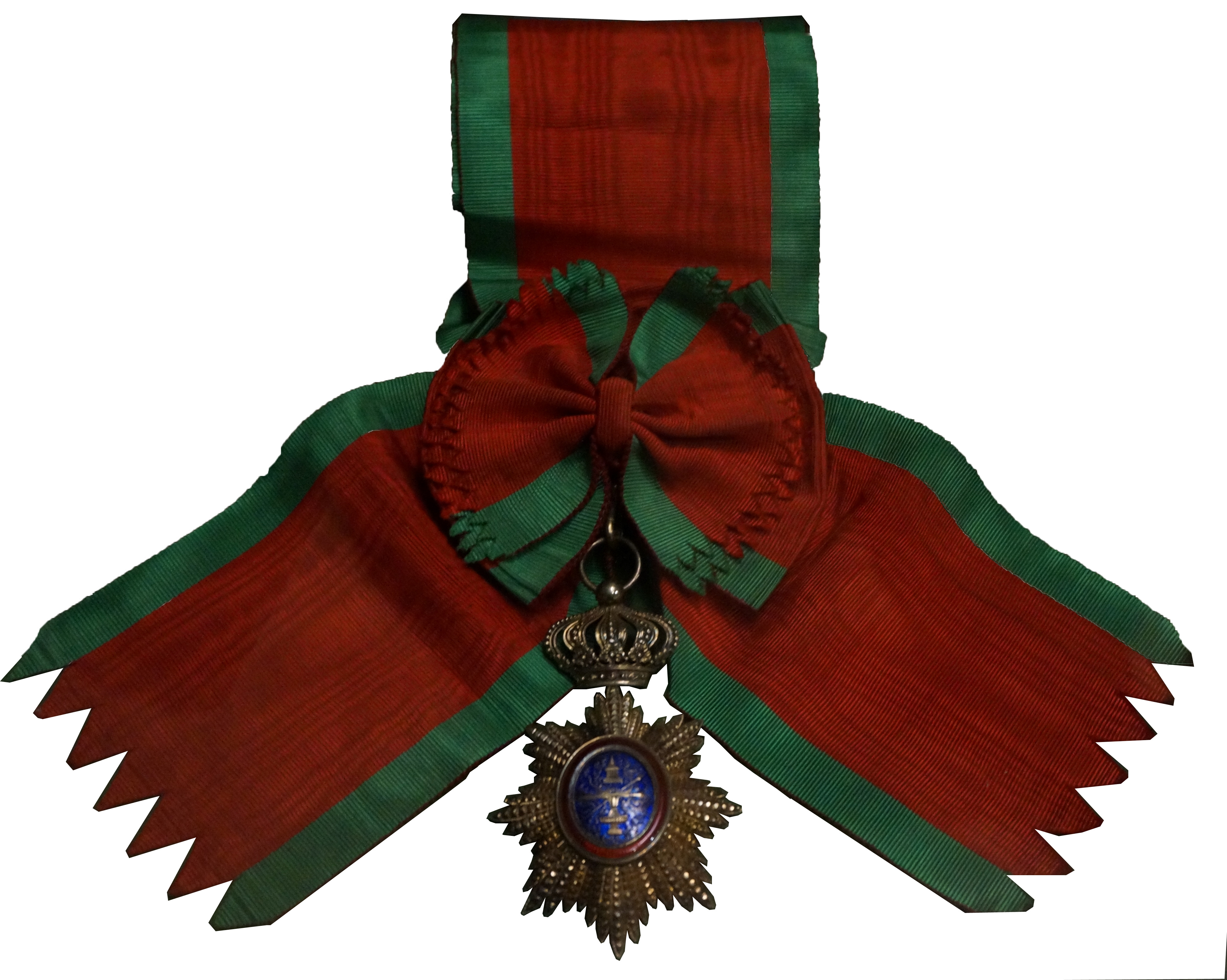
Cross of the Order of Cambodia 1856-1956.

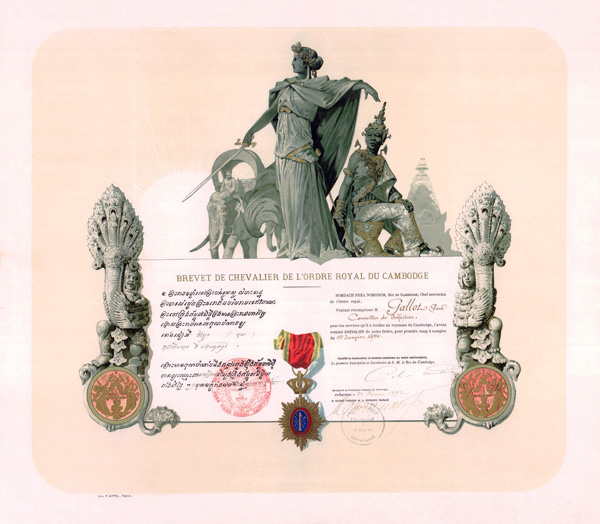
A certificate issued for the recipient of the Royal Order of the French protectorate of Cambodia, 1894.

== Recipients ==
Year appointed	Class	Name
1884	Knight	Charles Baret
1884	Knight	François Deuve
1884	Knight	Hypollite Herménégilde Tell
1885	Knight	Ernest Deuve
1885	Knight Grand Officer	Henri Rieunier
1888	Knight Grand Cross	Thanh Thái
1895	Knight Officer	Nikolai Kolomeitsev
1896	Knight	Henri Mordacq
1897	Knight Grand Cross	Jean-Baptiste Billot
1898	Knight	André Michelin
1901	Knight	Léon Breton
1901	Knight Officer	Octave Denis Victor Guillonnet
1901	Knight Grand Cross	Pakubuwono X
1905	Knight Grand Cross	Sisavang Vong
1907	Knight Grand Officer	Fukushima Yasumasa
1921	Knight Grand Cross	Joseph Joffre
1924	Knight	Jean Desbois
1929	Knight Grand Cross	Jagatjit Singh
1933	Knight Grand Cross	Ibrahim of Johor
1941	Knight Grand Cross	Norodom Suramarit
1954	Knight Grand Cross	Bhumibol Adulyadej
1956	Knight Grand Cross	Josip Broz Tito
1956	Knight Grand Cross	Antonín Zápotocký
1956	Knight Grand Cross	Ramon Magsaysay
1959	Knight Grand Cross	Savang Vatthana
1960	Knight Grand Cross	Antonín Novotný
1961	Knight Grand Cross	Charles de Gaulle
1962	Knight Grand Cross	Putra of Perlis
1965	Knight Grand Cross	Kim Il Sung
1992	Knight Grand Cross	Norodom Ranariddh
2001	Knight Grand Cross	Sok An
2002	Knight Grand Cross	Sirajuddin of Perlis
2002	Knight Grand Cross	Tuanku Tengku Fauziah
2003	Knight Grand Officer	Aun Pornmoniroth
2004	Knight Grand Cross	Norodom Sihamoni
2004	Knight Grand Cross	Norodom Monineath
2004	Knight Grand Cross	Kim Jong Il
2005	Knight Commander	Kazimierz Duchowski
2006	Knight Grand Cross	Norodom Arunrasmy
2006	Knight Grand Cross	John Sanderson
2007	Knight Grand Cross	Chau Sen Cocsal Chhum
2007	Knight Commander	Hor Nambora
2008	Knight Grand Officier	Bernard Krisher
2011	Knight Grand Cross	Hor Namhong
2013	Knight Grand Cross	Kao Kim Hourn
2014	Knight Grand Cross	Frank Berman
2018	Knight Grand Cross	Song Tao (diplomat)
2020	Knight Grand Cross	Oknha Na-Mey Ruy
2022	Knight Grand Cross	Dr Mihajlo Glamcevski
2022	Knight Grand Cross	Tengku Fauziah binti Almarhum Tengku Abdul Rashid
2023	Knight Grand Cross	Björn Stenvers
2023	Knight Grand Cross	Sambath Pol
2024	Knight Grand Cross	James McCabe
2024	Knight Grand Cross	Mike Smith
2024	Knight Grand Cross	Nick Rose
unknown	Knight Grand Cross	Emperor Akihito of Japan
unknown	Knight Grand Cross	Marcel Alessandri
unknown	Knight Grand Cross	Bảo Long
unknown	Knight Grand Cross	Bảo Đại
unknown	Knight Commander	Maryse Bastié
unknown	Knight	Henri Bellieni
unknown	Knight Commander	Gustave Besnard
unknown	Knight Commander	Albert Besson
unknown	Knight Grand Cross	Urban Jacob Rasmus Børresen
unknown	Knight Grand Cross	Sarin Chhak
unknown	Knight Officer	Émile Duboc
unknown	Knight Grand Cross	Hamengkubuwono VIII
unknown	Knight Grand Cross	Hassan II of Morocco
unknown	Knight Grand Cross	Hirohito
unknown	Knight Grand Cross	Jean de Lattre de Tassigny
unknown	Knight Grand Cross	Philippe Leclerc de Hauteclocque
unknown	Knight Grand Cross	Leopold II of Belgium
unknown	Knight	Jean-David Levitte
unknown	Knight Grand Cross	Manuel Luis Quezon
unknown	Knight Officer	Auguste Lumière
unknown	Knight Grand Cross	Raoul Magrin-Vernerey
unknown	Knight Grand Cross	Hun Manet
unknown	Knight	François Marjoulet
unknown	Knight Grand Officer	Boun Oum
unknown	Knight Officer	Marcel Ribière
unknown	Knight Grand Cross	Willem Rooseboom
unknown	Knight Grand Cross	Raoul Salan
unknown	Knight Grand Cross	Yōhei Sasakawa
unknown	Knight Grand Cross	Vong Savang
unknown	Knight Grand Cross	Tea Banh
unknown	Knight Grand Cross	Jean de Lattre de Tassigny
unknown	Knight Officer	Mardochée Valabrègue
unknown	Knight Officer	François Zimeray
unknown	Knight Grand Cross	Leopold III of Belgium
