= CIFE =

CIFE may refer to:

- Centre International de Formation Européenne, an international organisation which promotes European studies
- Central Institute of Fisheries Education, an institution of higher learning in India
- Conference for Independent Further Education (now CIFE – the Council for Independent Education), an association of UK independent colleges
- criminal investigative files exemption
