= Jordanian Association for Boy Scouts and Girl Guides =

National Scouting and Guiding organization of Jordan

- Country: Jordan
- Founded: 1954
- Membership: 25,000
- Affiliation: World Association of Girl Guides and Girl Scouts, World Organization of the Scout Movement
- Website http://www.jordanscouts.jo/

The Jordanian Association for Boy Scouts and Girl Guides (Arabic: جمعية الكشاف والمرشدات الأردنية) is the national Scouting and Guiding organization of Jordan. Scouting was founded in Jordan in 1954 and became a member of the World Organization of the Scout Movement in 1955. Guiding started in 1938 and became a member of the World Association of Girl Guides and Girl Scouts in 1978. It serves 15,521 Scouts (as of 2011) and 9,480 Guides (as of 2003).

The Scout slogan is, "the Scout movement participates in development and works to serve society."

Scouts and Guides participate in the painting of schools, building walls, laying floors in public places, conducting literacy campaigns, harvesting crops, visiting the poor, sick and aged.

Although the Association is for both boys and girls, the programs are separate and there are no mixed units.

The Scout Motto is Kun Musta'idan or كن مستعداً, translating as Be Prepared in Arabic, though the local variant is Wa ai'doo or و أعدوا. The noun for a single Scout is Kashaf or كشاف in Arabic.

== International Scouting units in Jordan ==
In addition, there are American Boy Scouts in Amman, linked to the Direct Service branch of the Boy Scouts of America, which supports units around the world.

== See also ==
- Ahmad Alhendawi
