= Ministry of Foreign Affairs and International Cooperation (Cambodia) =

Government ministry of Cambodia

- ក្រសួងការបរទេស និងសហប្រតិបត្តិការអន្តរជាតិ Ministère des affaires étrangères et de la coopération internationale
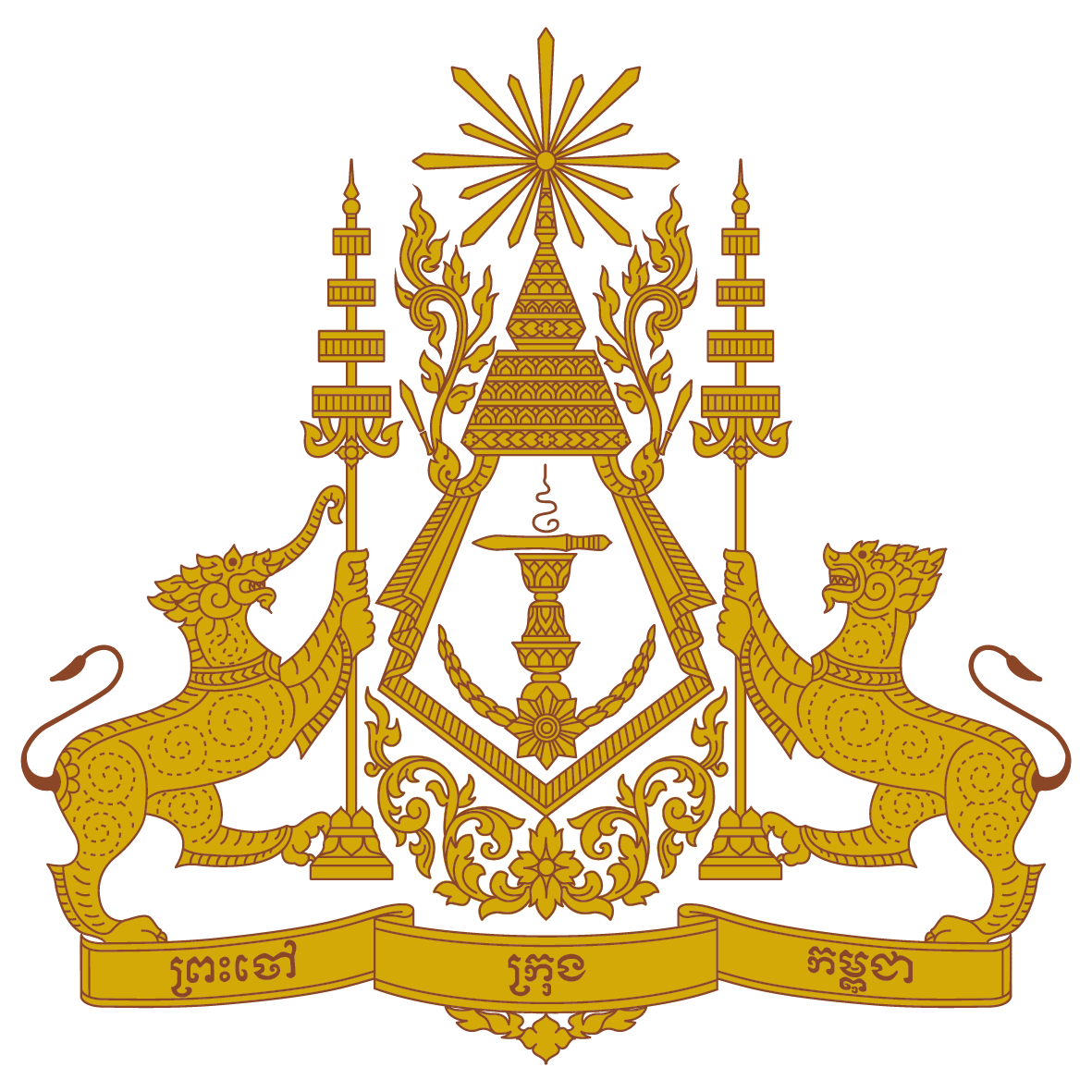
- Coat of Arms

Ministry overview
- Formed: 1957
- Jurisdiction: Royal Government of Cambodia
- Headquarters: 3 Samdech Hun Sen St., Phnom Penh 12207
- Minister responsible: Prak Sokhonn, Deputy Prime Minister, Minister of Foreign Affairs and International Cooperation
- Website: mfaic.gov.kh

The Ministry of Foreign Affairs and International Cooperation (MFA.IC; Khmer: ក្រសួងការបរទេស និងសហប្រតិបត្តិការអន្តរជាតិ) is the government ministry responsible for representing Cambodia to the international community. The ministry oversees the foreign relations of Cambodia, maintains diplomatic missions in other countries, and provides visa services.

As of 2024, the minister of foreign affairs is Prak Sokhonn. The ministry offices are in Phnom Penh.

== e-Visa system ==
The official Cambodian e-Visa logo

Presently an e-Visa system has been launched by the Ministry of Foreign Affairs and International Cooperation, which enables visitors to apply for a Cambodia tourist visa online. Instead of applying through the Cambodian Embassy, all that is needed to be done is to complete the online application form and pay with a credit card. After receiving the Visa through email, it should be printed and brought along when traveling to Cambodia. Tourists can apply for an online visa to Cambodia at the official website.

== Ministers ==
Minister of Foreign Affairs and International Cooperation
- រដ្ឋមន្ត្រីក្រសួងការបរទេសនិងកិច្ចសហប្រតិបត្តិការអន្តរជាតិ
- Royal arms of Cambodia

- Flag of Cambodia

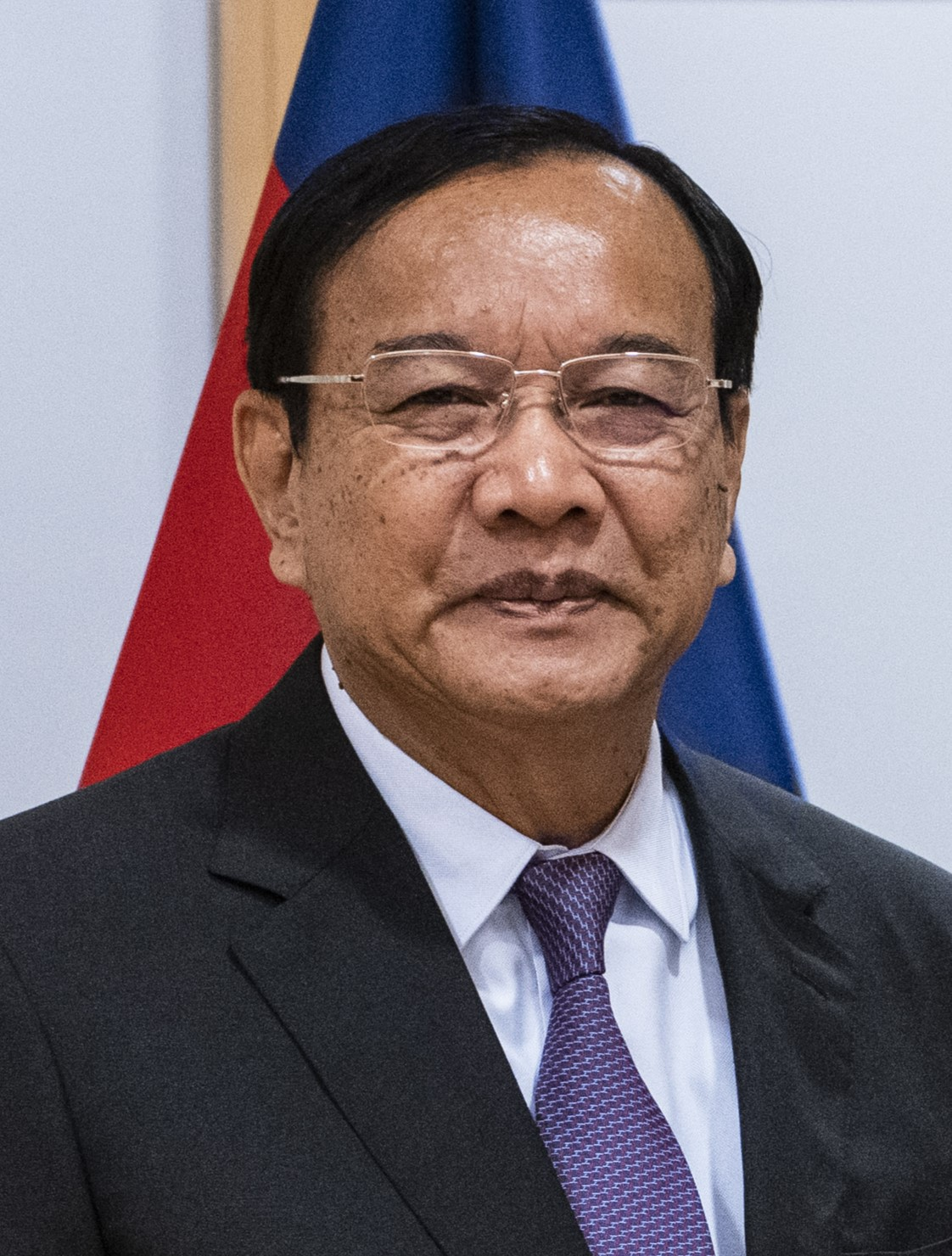
- Incumbent; Prak Sokhonn since 20 November 2024
- Style: His Excellency (formal, diplomatic)
- Member of: Cabinet
- Reports to: Prime Minister
- Seat: Phnom Penh, Cambodia
- Nominator: Prime Minister
- Appointer: H.M. The King
- Term length: No fixed term
- Inaugural holder: Sim Var
- Formation: 1957; 69 years ago

This is a list of ministers of foreign affairs and international cooperation of Cambodia:

No.	Portrait	Name (Birth–Death)	Term of office		Party
No.	Portrait	Name (Birth–Death)	Start	End	Party
First Kingdom of Cambodia (1953–1970)
1		Sim Var (1906–1989)	1957	11 January 1958	Sangkum
2		Penn Nouth (1906–1985)	11 January 1958	10 July 1958	Sangkum
3		Truong Cang (1913–1984)	1958	1958	Sangkum
4		Son Sann (1911–2000)	10 July 1958	19 April 1960	Sangkum
5		Tep Phan (1905–1978)	19 April 1960	28 January 1961	Sangkum
6		Nhiek Tioulong (1908–1996)	28 January 1961	13 February 1962	Sangkum
7		Prince; Norodom Kantol (1920–1976)	13 February 1962	1964	Sangkum
8		Huot Sambath (born 1928)	1964	1964	Sangkum
9		Koun Wick (1917–1999)	1964	1965	Sangkum
(7)		Prince; Norodom Kantol (1920–1976)	1965	1966	Sangkum
10		Prince; Norodom Viriya (born 1926)	1966	1966	Sangkum
11		Prince; Norodom Phurissara (1919–1976)	1966	1970	Sangkum
Khmer Republic (1970–1975)
12		Yem Sambaur (1913–1989)	1970	1970	Non-partisan
(9)		Koun Wick (1917–1999)	1970	1972	Non-partisan
13		Son Ngoc Thanh (1908–1977)	1972	1972	Khmer Serei
14		Long Boret (1933–1975)	1972	26 December 1973	PRS
15		Keuky Lim (born 1937)	26 December 1973	17 April 1975	PRS
Democratic Kampuchea (1975–1979)
16		Sarin Chhak (1922–1979) (Note: Foreign Minister in government in exile (GRUNK) since 1970.)	17 April 1975	4 April 1976	FUNK
17		Ieng Sary (1925–2013)	4 April 1976	7 January 1979	CPK
People's Republic of Kampuchea (1979–1989)
18		Hun Sen (born 1952)	10 January 1979	December 1986	KPRP
19		Kong Korm (born 1941)	December 1986	December 1987	KPRP
(18)		Hun Sen (born 1952)	1988	1989	KPRP
State of Cambodia (1989–1993)
(18)		Hun Sen (born 1952)	1989	1990	KPRP
20		Hor Namhong (born 1935)	1990	29 October 1993	KPRP (until 1991); CPP (from 1991)
Second Kingdom of Cambodia (1993–present)
21		Prince; Norodom Sirivudh (born 1951)	29 October 1993	24 October 1994	FUNCINPEC
22		Ung Huot (born 1945)	24 October 1994	30 November 1998	FUNCINPEC
(20)		Hor Namhong (born 1935)	30 November 1998	4 April 2016	CPP
23		Prak Sokhonn (born 1954)	5 April 2016	22 August 2023	CPP
24		Sok Chenda Sophea (born 1956)	22 August 2023	20 November 2024	CPP
(23)		Prak Sokhonn (born 1954)	20 November 2024	Incumbent	CPP

== See also ==
- Politics of Cambodia
- Foreign relations of Cambodia
