= Tep Phan =

Cambodian politician

Tep Phan is the former foreign minister and minister of the interior of Cambodia.
