= Norodom Kantol =

20th Prime Minister of Cambodia

Prime Minister of Cambodia
- In office: 6 October 1962 – 25 October 1966
- Predecessor: Chau Sen Cocsal (acting)
- Successor: Lon Nol
- Chief of State: Norodom Sihanouk

Minister of Foreign Affairs
- In office: 1965 – 1966
- Predecessor: Koun Wick
- Successor: Norodom Viriya
- In office: 1962 – 1964
- Predecessor: Nhiek Tioulong
- Successor: Koun Wick
- Born: 15 September 1920; Phnom Penh, Cambodia, French Indochina
- Died: 1976 (aged 55–56); Ou Reang Ov, Democratic Kampuchea
- Spouse: Neak Moneang Chuop Samon
- Issue: 8 children
- House: Norodom
- Father: Norodom Singhara
- Mother: Sisowath Thavet Roeungsi
- Education: Nancy-Université
- Political party: Sangkum
- Relatives: Norodom Sihanouk (cousin)

Norodom Kantol (Khmer: នរោត្តម កន្តុល; 15 September 1920 – 1976) was a member of the Cambodian royal family and Prime Minister of Cambodia, serving from 1962 to 1966. He also served as foreign minister under the Sangkum government led by his cousin, Norodom Sihanouk. During the Khmer Republic regime of Lon Nol, he was imprisoned along with other members of the royal family.

== Disappearance ==
Kantol disappeared mysteriously in 1976, presumably killed by the Khmer Rouge. Kantol was a leading adviser of Norodom Sihanouk. At the end of his tenure, he had been the longest continuously serving prime minister, and the first to have served more than 2 years.

== Honour ==
=== Foreign honour ===
- Malaysia:
  - Honorary Recipient of the Most Exalted Order of the Crown of the Realm (1964)

== See also ==
- List of people who disappeared mysteriously: post-1970

== Ancestry ==
Ancestors of Norodom Kantol

8.
4.
9.
2. Norodom Singhara
10.
5.
11.
1. Norodom Kantol
12. Sisowath of Cambodia
6. Sisowath Monivong
13. Varni Van
3. Sisowath Thavet Roeungsi
14. Norodom Hassakan
7. Norodom Kanviman Norleak Tevi
15. Sao Sambhat

== Bibliography ==
- Lentz, Harris M., ed. (2014). Heads of States and Governments Since 1945. Taylor & Francis. ISBN 9781134264902.

Norodom Kantol House of Norodom Born: 15 September 1920 Died: 1976
Political offices
Preceded by Chau Sen Cocsal Chhum	Prime Minister of Cambodia; 1962–1966	Succeeded by Lon Nol
