= Alexandre Percin =

French military officer (1846–1928)

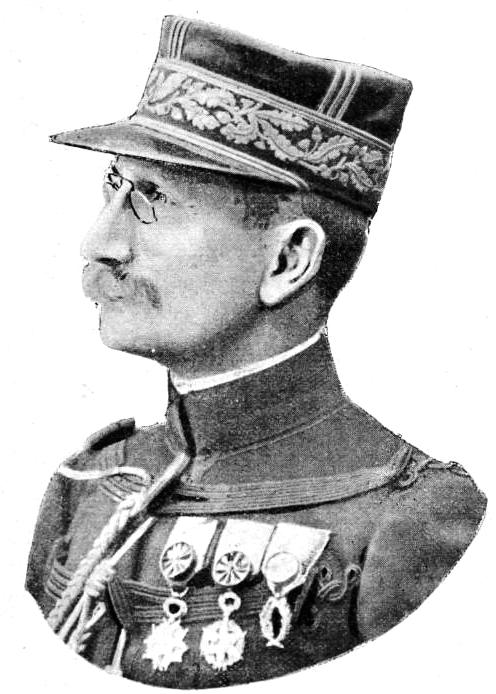
- Born: 4 July 1846; Meurthe-et-Moselle, France
- Died: 12 October 1928 (aged 82)
- Military career
- Allegiance: France
- Branch: French Army
- Rank: Brigadier General

Général Alexandre Percin was a French military officier, chief of staff for Louis André, the Minister of War responsible for the Affaire des Fiches, from 1900 to 1904.

== Life ==
Born in 1846 in Meurthe-et-Moselle in Nancy, he entered into the École Polytechnique in 1865 and took part, in 1870, in the Franco-Prussian War. He was injured at Patay on 2 December 1870 and at Bécon on 26 April 1871. He distinguished himself during the campaign, and was awarded the rank of captain. In 1879, he entered into the General Staff for Artillery, and become professor of artillery at the Ecole Spéciale Militaire de Saint-Cyr as chef d'escadron in 1882. He was raised to colonel and inspector for arms manufacturing in 1895. It was in this post that he attracted the attention of Général André in May 1900, when he was named his chief of staff and brigadier general.

Appreciated during his service in that position, Percin was described by André in 1904 as: "[an officer] generally very intelligent, very vigorous, very active, with a capacity for exceptional work, assiduous and methodical: he wrote well, and with grace." These qualities were not disputed by Lieutenant Colonel Émile Mayer, who had opportunity to judge Percin because of his friendship with the Minister of War. Mayer, who well knew the two men, recalled that they were commanded together to Angoulême and that "André had there the opportunity to appreciate his young comrade, of whom he had a high estimation of intelligence, of professional valor, and of moral quality... They were equally inclined to intransigence and were also committed to remain on the path which both had decided to accomplish."

Percin was part of the list of six generals, drawn up by an informant, who together were described as being Freemasons. For Émile Mayer, "Percin had been, if not the instigator, at least the principal instrument of that thing which is called the 'système des fiches'." Because of his republicanism and his relatives, Percin was considered to be the probable successor to the Minister of War before he quit the cabinet of André in 1904. He was then replaced by Colonel Mardochée Valabrègue.

In 1914, he was put in charge of the defense of Lille against the German Army. His defense of the city was controversial because of an accusation that he had abandoned the city; in his book Lille, published in 1919, he argued that he had only been following orders.

== Bibliography ==
- Général Percin, "Le combat," Alcan, 1914
- Général Percin, 1914, Les Erreurs du haut-commandement, Paris : Albin Michel, 1919, 287 p.
- Général Percin, "Massacre de notre infanterie, 1914–1918," Albin Michel, 1921

== Sources ==
- Émile Mayer, Nos chefs de 1914, Paris : Librairie Stock, 1930, 317 p.
- Bruno Besnier, L'affaire des fiches : un système d'État (1900–1914), La Roche-sur-Yon : Master I d'histoire, 2005.
- Serge Doessant, Le général André, de l'affaire Dreyfus à l'affaire des fiches, Editions Glyphe, Paris, 2009, 416 p.
