= Scott A. Teare =

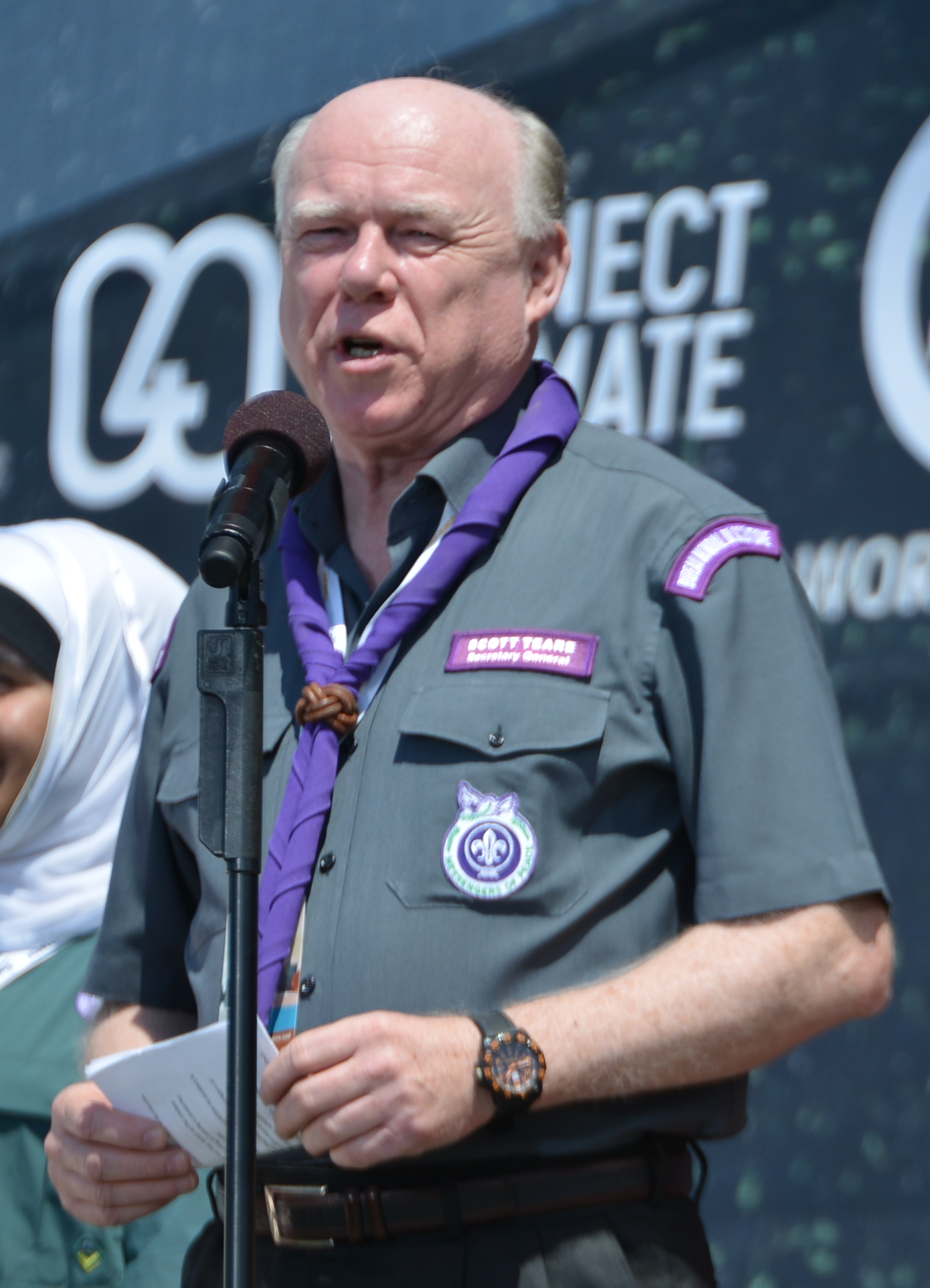
- Teare in 2015

Secretary General of the World Scout Committee
- In office 2013–2017
- Preceded by: Luc Panissod
- Succeeded by: Ahmad Alhendawi

Scott A. Teare (born 1951) became the Secretary General and one of 12 elected volunteer members of the World Scout Committee, the main executive body of the World Organization of the Scout Movement in January 2013.

Teare's mother was a Den Leader and his father was a Cubmaster in the Boy Scouts of America. At the age of eight he joined the Cubs. He says "Cub Scouting brought us together and made us much closer where we had adult-like conversations..." He became an Eagle Scout, had a 38-year career that began in his hometown of Flint, Michigan. He worked as a part-time Scout Executive of Tall Pine Council while finishing a degree at the University of Michigan, then joined professional Scouting full time in 1974. After serving as Scout Executive of Thatcher Woods Area Council in Oak Park, Illinois, he joined the national BSA staff in 1990. In addition to his 13 years as Director of the International Division, he served in the Finance Support Division, the External Communications Division, and the office of the Chief Scout Executive. He first attended the 18th World Scout Jamboree in 1995.

Appointed on 29 September 2012, Teare became the first non-European to serve as WOSM Secretary General, taking up the post on 1 January 2013. Teare's appointment came at a critical moment, said Dan Ownby of Houston, who also serves on the World Scout Committee, which selected Teare. "At the world level, we've been doing a major reconstruction of the office with a potential change of location, a new accounting system, and a realignment of the office structure. These are not easy changes, but we've seen the world change, and world Scouting has to keep up with that change."

In 2012, Teare was awarded the 339th Bronze Wolf, the only distinction of the World Organization of the Scout Movement, awarded by the World Scout Committee for exceptional services to world Scouting.

In August 2013, Teare announced his intention to relocate the World Scout Bureau Central Office (WSB-CO) to Kuala Lumpur. The Bureau was first established in London, England in 1920, moved to Ottawa, Ontario, Canada in 1959 and has been located in Geneva, Switzerland since 1968.

== See also ==
World Organization of the Scout Movement
Preceded by Luc Panissod	Secretary General; 2013 - 2017	Succeeded by Ahmad Alhendawi
