= Ung Huot =

32nd Prime Minister of Cambodia

- អ៊ឹង ហួត

First Prime Minister of Cambodia
- In office 6 August 1997 – 30 November 1998 Serving with Hun Sen (as Second Prime Minister)
- Monarch: Norodom Sihanouk
- Preceded by: Norodom Ranariddh
- Succeeded by: Hun Sen (as Prime Minister)

Minister of Foreign Affairs and International Cooperation
- In office 24 October 1994 – 30 November 1998
- Prime Minister: Norodom Ranariddh; Hun Sen
- Preceded by: Norodom Sirivudh
- Succeeded by: Hor Namhong

Minister of Education, Youth and Sports
- In office 24 September 1993 – 24 October 1994
- Prime Minister: Norodom Ranariddh; Hun Sen

Member of the National Assembly
- In office 14 June 1993 – 26 July 1998
- Constituency: Kandal

Personal details
- Born: Kandal, Cambodia, French Indochina
- Citizenship: Cambodia; Australia
- Party: FUNCINPEC
- Spouse: Ung Malis Yvonne
- Education: Royal University of Phnom Penh; University of Melbourne (MBA)

Ung Huot (Khmer: អ៊ឹង ហួត) is a Cambodian politician who served as Prime Minister of Cambodia from 1997 to 1998, alongside Hun Sen. A member of the FUNCINPEC Party, he served as Minister of Education, and Minister of Foreign Affairs prior to his appointment as First Prime Minister.

== Early life ==
Ung Huot graduated with a bachelor's degree in commerce from the Royal University of Phnom Penh. He received a Colombo Plan scholarship to study in Australia in 1971, and graduated from the University of Melbourne with a Master of Business Administration degree.

Huot remained in Australia while the Khmer Rouge seized control of Cambodia; four friends of his from Melbourne University that returned to Cambodia were killed by the Khmer Rouge. Huot worked with Cambodian refugees in Australia. He returned to Cambodia in 1991.

== Career ==
=== Foreign Minister ===
Huot signed the Treaty of Amity and Cooperation in Southeast Asia, which allowed Cambodia to be a formal observer at 28th ASEAN Ministerial Meeting in July 1995. Cambodia applied for membership in ASEAN on 23 March 1996.

=== Prime Minister ===
First Prime Minister Norodom Ranariddh and FUNCINPEC were overthrown in a coup d'état by Hun Sen and the Cambodian People's Party (CPP) on 5 July 1997. A rump group of FUNCINPEC leaders nominated Huot, who was in Paris during the coup, to replace Ranariddh as first prime minister. Huot accepted the position stating that "Life must go on and Cambodia has suffered too much." The National Assembly voted 86 to 4 in favour of Huot's appointment.

King Norodom Sihanouk stated on 7 August that he would not recognise Huot as prime minister. Sihanouk declared Sen's coup as illegal on 10 August. However, Sihanouk told the Secretary-General of the United Nations that Huot and Sen would be representing Cambodia at the United Nations starting 16 September. The United Nations General Assembly, after pressure from the United States, recommended that no delegation from Cambodia be seated.

Stephen Solarz was appointed by U.S. Secretary of State Madeleine Albright to serve as a special envoy to seek a resolution in the Cambodian conflict. Solarz reaffirmed the United States' position that Huot was not Ranariddh's successor. ASEAN allowed Huot to sit at its meetings as an observer, with him recognised as foreign minister not prime minister.

An agreement proposed by Japan resolved the conflict resulted in Ranariddh being tried in absentia, pardoned by Sihanouk after a request from Sen, a ceasefire, and new elections. The CCP won a majority of the seats in the 1998 election.

== Personal life ==
Huot married Ung Malis Yvonne.

== Works cited ==
=== Books ===
- Brown, MacAlister; Zasloff, Joseph (1998). Cambodia Confounds the Peacemakers, 1979-1998. Cornell University Press. ISBN 0801435366.

=== Journals ===
- Sothirak, Pou (2016). "Cambodia and ASEAN Relations: Retrospect and Prospect". ISIS Focus. Institute of Strategic and International Studies: 26–27. doi:10.32350/resrep13556.15. JSTOR resrep13556.15.

=== News ===
- "Ung Huot, Democratically, Stands in Line". The Phnom Penh Post. 13 January 1995. Archived from the original on 11 November 2026.
- Williams, Freya (27 July 1998). "Ung Huot, Democratically, Stands in Line". The Cambodia Daily. Archived from the original on 4 September 2017.

Political offices
Preceded by Norodom Ranarridh	Prime Minister of Cambodia; 1997–1998	Succeeded by Hun Sen
Preceded by Norodom Sirivudh	Minister of Foreign Affairs; 1994–1998	Succeeded by Hor Namhong
