= Prak Sokhonn =

Cambodian politician

His Excellency Prak Sokhonn
- ប្រាក់ សុខុន
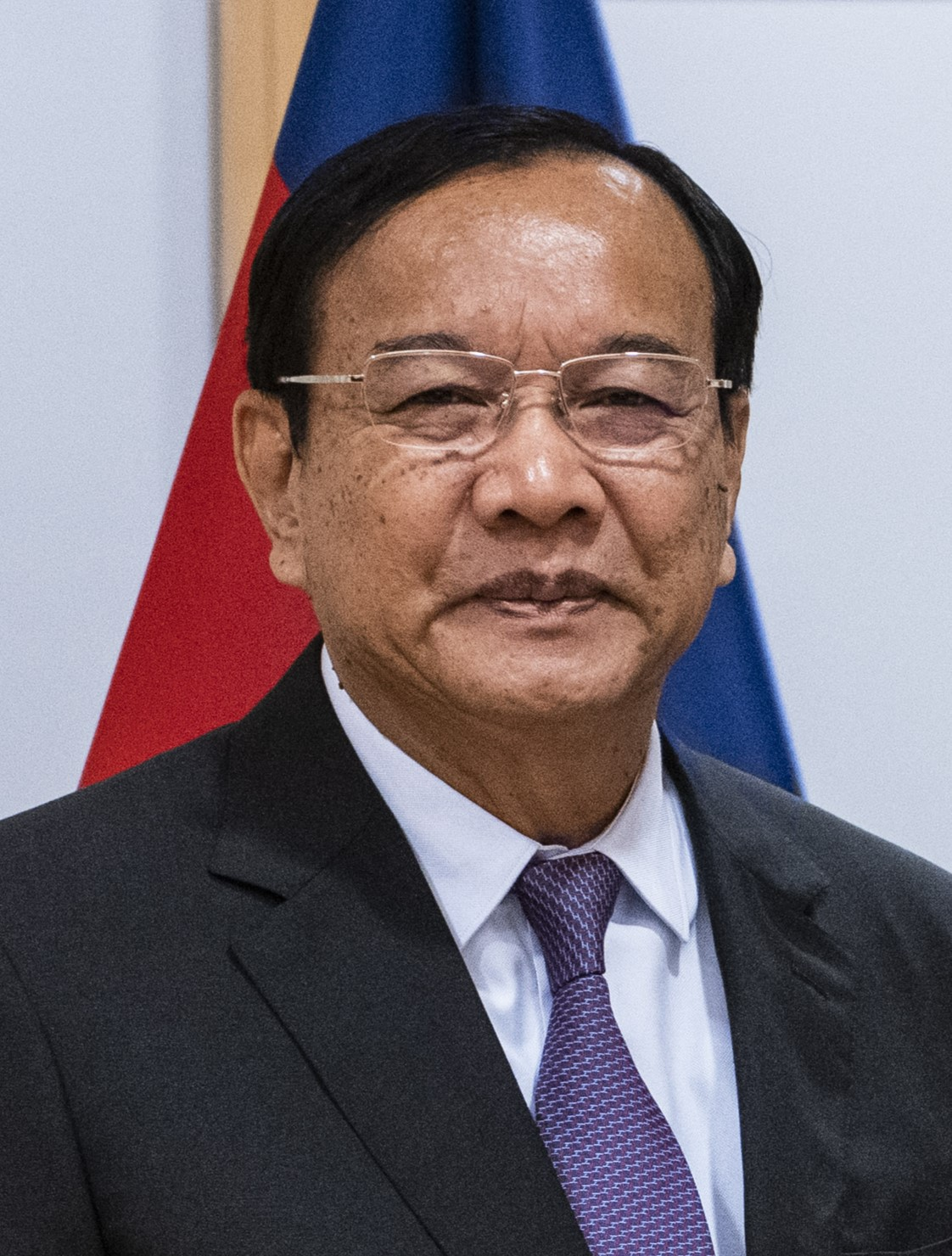
- Sokhonn in 2022

Minister of Foreign Affairs and International Cooperation
- Incumbent
- Assumed office 20 November 2024
- Prime Minister: Hun Manet
- Preceded by: Sok Chenda Sophea
- In office 5 April 2016 – 22 August 2023
- Prime Minister: Hun Sen
- Preceded by: Hor Namhong
- Succeeded by: Sok Chenda Sophea

Deputy Prime Minister of Cambodia
- Incumbent
- Assumed office 20 November 2024
- Prime Minister: Hun Manet
- In office 6 September 2018 – 22 August 2023
- Prime Minister: Hun Sen

First Vice President of the Senate
- In office 3 April 2024 – 19 November 2024
- President: Hun Sen
- Preceded by: Sim Ka
- Succeeded by: Ouch Borith

Minister of Posts and Telecommunications
- In office 24 September 2013 – 4 April 2016
- Prime Minister: Hun Sen
- Preceded by: So Khun
- Succeeded by: Tram Iv Tek

Member of Parliament for Kandal
- In office 5 September 2018 – 2 April 2024

Personal details
- Born: 3 May 1954 (age 72) Phnom Penh, Cambodia
- Party: Cambodian People's Party
- Spouse: Kheng Samvada
- Children: 3

Military service
- Allegiance: People's Republic of Kampuchea; State of Cambodia; Kingdom of Cambodia
- Branch/service: Kampuchean People's Revolutionary Army; Cambodian People’s Army; Royal Cambodian Army
- Years of service: 1979–1993
- Rank: General

Prak Sokhonn (Khmer: ប្រាក់ សុខុន; born 3 May 1954) is a Cambodian politician, diplomat and journalist who has served as deputy prime minister and foreign minister since 2024. He previously served in the same positions from 2016 to 2023. He briefly served as vice president of the Senate before being reappointed foreign minister in November 2024.

== Early life and education ==
Sokhonn was born on 3 May 1954 in Phnom Penh, Cambodia. Sokhonn studied law in Phnom Penh between 1972 and 1975.

== Career ==
Sokhonn with US Secretary of State Marco Rubio in Manila, Philippines, 23 July 2026.

Sokhonn entered the Kampuchean People's Revolutionary Armed Forces in 1979, eventually becoming a 4-star general as well as the Spokesman of the Royal Cambodian Armed Forces. He also spent three years as an ambassador in Europe.

He was the Minister of Posts and Telecommunications from 2013 to 2016.

He was sworn in as foreign minister on April 5, 2016. His predecessor Hor Namhong retired from his post as foreign minister on 4 April 2016 after 17 years in office, though remained as a deputy prime minister.

Prior to being named Minister of Posts and Telecommunications, Sokhonn was Vice-President of the Cambodian Mine Action and Victim Assistance Authority, which regulates landmine clearance and assistance to landmine survivors in Cambodia. During that tenure, he was elected to chair the Anti-Personnel Mine Ban Convention, better known as the Ottawa Treaty, aimed at eliminating landmines around the world, for one year, including presiding over the diplomatic treaty's meeting in Phnom Penh. As President of the conference, he tried to promote adherence to the landmine treaty in South East Asia, succeeding in securing the participation of Myanmar in the meeting The Eleventh Meeting of the States Parties to the Anti-Personnel Mine Ban Convention (11MSP) chaired by Sokhonn, was the largest international gathering ever hosted in Cambodia.

In November 2021, Hun Sen signaled he may replace Erywan Yusof with Sokhonn, who has criticized the Burmese military regime, when Cambodia chairs ASEAN next year, as ASEAN's special envoy to Myanmar. Sokhonn was confirmed to succeed Yusof on 1 January 2022.

== Personal life ==
Sokhonn is married to Kheng Samvada, and they have a daughter and two sons. He speaks fluent Khmer, French, and English.

== See also ==
- List of foreign ministers in 2016
- List of foreign ministers in 2017
- List of current foreign ministers

Political offices
Preceded by So Khun	Minister of Posts and Telecommunications; 2013–2016	Succeeded by Tram Iv Tek
Preceded by Hor Namhong	Minister of Foreign Affairs and International Cooperation; 2016–present	Incumbent
