= Hor Nambora =

Cambodian diplomat (1957–2024)

His Excellency Hor Nambora GOC

Ambassador of Cambodia to the United Kingdom
- In office 2004–2013
- Prime Minister: Hun Sen
- Succeeded by: Meas Kim Heng

Personal details
- Born: 27 July 1957
- Died: 3 July 2024 (aged 66)
- Party: Cambodian People's Party
- Profession: Diplomat

Hor Nambora (or Nam Bora, 27 July 1957 – 3 July 2024) was a Cambodian diplomat who was the ambassador to the United Kingdom, Ireland, the Nordic countries and Ethiopia as of 2012. His father is Cambodian diplomat and politician Hor Namhong.

Living as an exile in Paris, Nambora was studying physics and mathematics but earned no degree. Believing they represented a fresh hope for the war-torn country, Nambora returned to Cambodia where he was immediately interned in a labour camp where his father Hor Namhong served as a chief of Being Trabek Prison. He worked as a researcher at the Tuol Sleng Genocide Museum from 1980 to 1985 and as director of the Humanitarian Relief Committee in Kompong Som Port from 1986 to 1987. In 1988 he joined the Foreign Ministry and within a few years was appointed to posts in Thailand and then with the United Nations in Geneva.

In 1996 Nambora returned to Cambodia to enter politics, accepting the titles of Under-secretary of State and Foreign Affairs Adviser from prime minister Hun Sen. In 1999 he, with help of his father Hor Namhong, returned to diplomacy when he was appointed ambassador to Australia and New Zealand. Nambora used his position there to improve ties between ASEAN leaders and those countries. In 2004 he was transferred to London when he was appointed ambassador to the United Kingdom, Denmark, Finland, Ireland, Norway and Sweden. He became the first Cambodian ambassador to the United Kingdom since the embassy was abandoned in 1975. In 2011 the ambassadorship to Ethiopia was added to his responsibilities.

Nambora died on 3 July 2024, at the age of 66.

== Awards and honours ==
In 2002 he was awarded the 'Citizen of Humanity' award by Australia's National Committee on Human Rights Education.

In 2007 he became a Commander of the Royal Order of Cambodia and in 2010 a Grand Officer of the same order.
