= Koun Wick =

Cambodian diplomat (1917–1999)

Cambodian Ambassador to Japan
- In office 1974–1975
- Appointed by: Lon Nol
- Preceded by: Sim Var
- Succeeded by: Truong Mealy

Minister of Foreign Affairs
- In office 1970–1972
- Prime Minister: Lon Nol; Sisowath Sirik Matak
- Preceded by: Yem Sambaur
- Succeeded by: Son Ngoc Thanh
- In office 25 December 1964 – 25 October 1966
- Prime Minister: Norodom Kantol
- Preceded by: Huot Sambath
- Succeeded by: Norodom Viriya

Personal details
- Born: 10 November 1917 Cambodia, French Indochina (now Cambodia)
- Died: 27 December 1999 (aged 82) London, England, UK
- Relatives: Chau Sen Cocsal Chhum (cousin)

Koun Wick (10 November 1917 – 27 December 1999) was a Cambodian statesman and diplomat who served as Minister of Foreign Affairs from 1970 to 1972 and from 1964 to 1966. He was a cousin of former prime minister Chau Sen Cocsal Chhum.
