= Mardochée Venture =

French Judaic scholar and translator

Mardochée Venture (Hebrew: מרדכי ונטורה, romanized: Mordekhai Ventura; c. 1730 – 12 March 1789) was a French Judaic scholar and translator. He served as secretary and Hebrew interpreter at the Library of King Louis XVI (now the Bibliothèque nationale de France).

In collaboration with Isaïe Vidal (1713–1771), Venture composed the Seder ha-Kontres (Avignon, 1765), a collection of liturgical chants for the use of the Jews of the county of Venaissin, known as Papal Jews. This compilation includes a piyyut composed by Venture, partly in Hebrew and partly in Provençal, which was translated into French by Ernest Sabatier in his Chansons hébraïco-provençales des juifs comtadins (Nîmes, 1874) and by Pedro II of Brazil, in his Poésies hébraïco-provençales du rituel israélite comtadin (Avignon, 1891). Venture's translations of prayer books were republished through the 19th century.

== Publications ==
- Calendrier hébraïque, qui contient tous les roshodes, samedis, solemnités et jeûnes de l'année. Amsterdam. 1745.
- Seder ha-Kontres. Avignon. 1765. With Isaïe Vidal.
- Prière prononcée le 5 Mars 1768 par les juifs avignonois et avignonois de Bordeaux demeurant à Paris, à l'occasion de la maladie de Sa Majesté la reine de France, pour demander à Dieu le rétablissement de sa santé. Paris: M. Lambert. 1768.
- Calendrier hébraïque, qui contient tous les roshodes, samedis, solemnités et jeûnes de l'année. Joseph, Jacob & Abraham, Salomon Proops. 1770.
- Patshegen ha-ketav: Targum sheni 'al Megilat Esther. Amsterdam: Proops. 1770.
- Prières journalières à l'usage des juifs portugais ou espagnols. Nice: M. Lambert. 1772.
- Prières des Jours du Rosch-Haschana et du Jour de Kippour. Nice. 1773.
- Cantique des cantiques; avec la paraphrase Chaldaïque, et traite d'Aboth, ou des Pères de la doctrine. Nice: M. Lambert. 1774.
- Prière prononcée le 1er mai 1774, par les Juifs avignonois et avignonois de Bordeaux, demeurant à Paris, à l'occasion de la maladie de Sa Majesté Louis XV le Bien-Aimé, pour demander à Dieu le rétablissement de sa santé. Paris: M. Lambert. 1774.
- Almanach des Juifs, pour l'année lunaire commune 5539 de la création, inséré dans l'Almanach des Chrétiens pour l'année solaire 1779. Avignon: M. Sorin. 1779.
- Action de grâces à l'occasion de l'heureuse délivrance de la reine et de la naissance du Dauphin. 1781.
- Prières à l'occasion de la grossesse de la reine, récitée par les différentes communautés des juifs de l'Alsace dans leurs synagogues. Paris: P. F. Gueffier. 1781.
- Prières des jours des jeûnes de Guedalya, de Tebeth, d'Esther, de Tamouz et d'Ab, à l'usage des juifs portugais ou espagnols. Nice: Lambert & Baudouin. 1783.
- Prières des fêtes de Pessach, Schebouot, et de Souccot. Paris. 1807. (2d ed., Paris, 1845).
