= Mardochée Valabrègue =

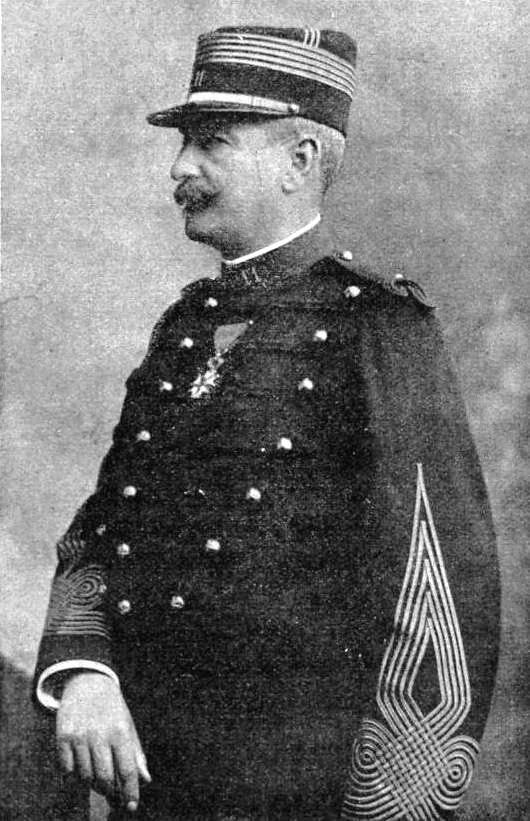
- Born: 20 September 1852; Carpentras, France
- Died: 26 March 1934 (aged 81); Paris, France
- Military career
- Allegiance: France
- Branch: French Army
- Rank: Divisional General
- Awards: Grand Officer of the Legion of Honour Officer of the Nichan Iftikhar; Officer of the Order of the Rising Sun; Officer of the Royal Order of Cambodia Officer of the Order of the Dragon of Annam
- Other work: Chief of Staff for the Minister of War

Mardochée Valabrègue (20 September 1852 – 26 March 1934) was a French soldier and the successor of Général Alexandre Percin as Chief of Staff for Minister of War Louis André.

== Biography ==
Valabrègue was born in 1852 in Carpentras to Isaac Valabrègue and Debora Elodie Mendez. He was admitted to the École polytechnique in 1871, training for the artillery. In 1878, he served with the 23rd Artillery Region and became in charge of the manufacture of munitions in Tulle.

He became a captain in 1878 and Officer of Ordnance for Minister of War Georges Boulanger in 1886. A brilliant officer of the general staff, he was noted in 1895 as being "of exceptional intelligence, perfect conduct in service, well-honed knowledge both military and general, great aptitude for service in the general staff... such as these are in the resume of the qualities of [Valabrègue]." Later, when he was publicly Jewish, Pierre Rocolle wrote that "there is nothing which proves the claim of the anti-Semites that there was a correlation between the Dreyfuss affair and the flattering promotions which... they received."

Promoted to squadron leader in 1889, he was promoted to colonel in 1902, when he was commander of the École d'application de l'artillerie et du génie. In 1903 he became chief of staff for the 11th Artillery Regiment, where he was appreciated enough to be named chief of staff for General André in 1904, then Maurice Berteaux in 1905. He was made a brigadier general in 1905, commander of the École de Guerre in 1907, divisional general in 1908, commander of the 12th Infantry Division and of the garrison at Reims from October 10, 1908, to March 14, 1911, commander of the 3rd Army Corps in 1911, and finally member of the Conseil Supérieur de la Guerre in 1914, when Joffre was Chief of Staff.

At the onset of the First World War, he commanded a group of reserve divisions in the Fifth Army of General Charles Lanrezac. Valabrègue's divisions were dissolved on September 30, 1914, when Lanrezac was sacked by Joffre. He then became inspector for camps and infantry depots until 1917, when he retired and entered the reserves.

He died on March 26, 1934, in Paris.

== Sources ==
- Bruno Besnier, L'affaire des fiches : un système d'État (1900-1914), La Roche-sur-Yon : Master I d'histoire, 2005.
- Serge Doessant, Le général André, de l'affaire Dreyfus à l'affaire des fiches, Editions Glyphe, Paris, 2009, 416 p.
