= Chau Sen Cocsal Chhum =

Cambodian politician (1905–2009)

Samdech Chau Sen Cocsal Chhum
- ចៅ សែនកុសល ឈុំ
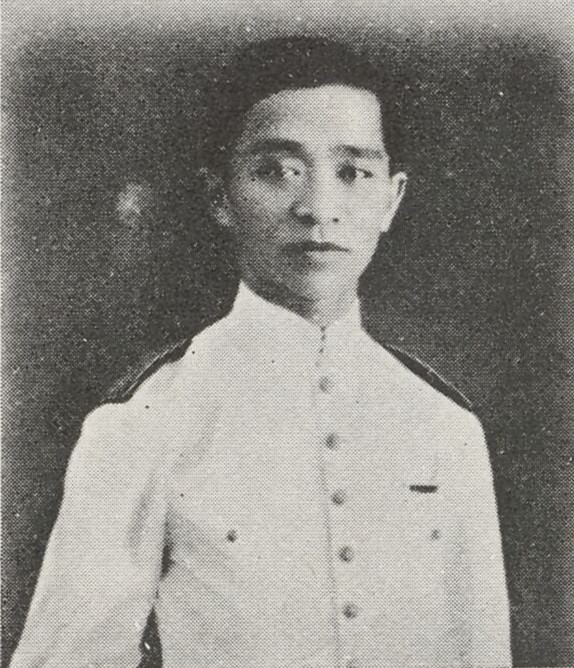
- Chhum in 1942

Prime Minister of Cambodia
- Acting
- In office 6 August 1962 – 6 October 1962
- Monarch: Sisowath Kossamak
- President: Norodom Sihanouk
- Preceded by: Nhiek Tioulong
- Succeeded by: Norodom Kantol

President of the National Assembly
- In office 1966–1968
- In office 1962–1963

Personal details
- Born: 1 September 1905 Tri Tôn, Châu Đốc, Cochinchina, French Indochina (now An Giang, Vietnam)
- Died: 22 January 2009 (aged 103) Phnom Penh, Cambodia
- Party: Sangkum (1955–1970)
- Spouse: Vann Thi Hai (m. 1940)
- Children: 7
- Relatives: Koun Wick (cousin)
- Ethnicity: Khmer Krom

Chau Sen Cocsal (Khmer: ចៅ សែនកុសល, Chau Sênkŏsâl; 1 September 1905 – 22 January 2009), also known as Chhum (Khmer: ឈុំ, Chhŭm), was a Cambodian civil servant and politician who served as the Prime Minister of Cambodia in 1962 and the President of the National Assembly twice, in 1962–1963 and 1966–1968. Chhum was awarded the honorary title "Samdech" in 1993 by King Norodom Sihanouk.

== Early life ==
Chhum was born into an ethnic Khmer (Khmer Krom) family in the commune of Tri Tôn, Châu Đốc Province (today renamed as An Giang Province), French Indochina (present-day Vietnam), on 1 September 1905. Chhum attended primary school at Phnom Penh before moving to Saigon where he attended the Lycée Chasseloup-Laubat. At the age of 21, he became the first Cambodian to graduate there with a baccalaureate in French and Philosophy. Upon graduation, he began a career in the French Colonial Administration in Phnom Penh, Cambodia, with the position of Second Class Civil Servant (Cadre Supérieur de Deuxième Classe / Anuk Montrei).

== Career ==
In 1928, Chau Sen Cocsal was promoted Deputy Governor of Takéo Province (Gouverneur Adjoint), then successively posted in Tralach District, Takéo Province, in 1931 and Thbaung Khmaum, Kompong Cham Province, in 1935. In 1938, Chhum became Governor of Svay Rieng Province. From 1940 to 1944, he was the Governor of Kompong Chhnang Province. During World War II, Chhum refused to supply forced labour to the Japanese occupying forces in Cambodia and joined the resistance in the jungle.

With the return of the French Administration, Chhum was nominated Mayor of Phnom Penh in 1945, Governor of Kompong Cham Province in 1946, and then the Governor of Kandal Province in 1948. In 1951, Chhum was sent to Thailand as Cambodia's first ambassador to a foreign country. Chhum returned to Cambodia in 1952 and once more took to the jungle to fight for the country's independence from France.

In 1955, Chau Sen Cocsal was elected to the Cambodian National Assembly as a deputy of Kompong Cham Province. From 1958 to 1963, he occupied the position of President of the National Assembly. In 1969, at the age of 64, Chhum retired from public office.

In April 1975, after the fall of Phnom Penh to the Khmer Rouge and Saigon to North Vietnamese troops and the Viet Cong, as Chau Sen Cocsal was visiting relatives in Kampuchea Krom, he was arrested by Vietnamese authorities. Charged with spying for the US Central Intelligence Agency, Chhum was incarcerated for 17 months in what he would later describe as a "chicken box" and then in a room where he took turns sleeping with 40 other prisoners. Chau Sen Cocsal spent an additional two years under house arrest in Saigon. Under the pressure of France, Vietnam released Chhum, who was allowed to migrate to France with his wife.

In 1991, following the signature of the Paris Peace Agreements, King Norodom Sihanouk nominated Chau Sen Cocsal Chhum as President of Cambodia's Supreme National Council (SNC). From 1992 onwards, he became High Privy Advisor to King Norodom Sihanouk. In 1993, Chau Sen Cocsal Chhum was awarded the highest rank in Cambodia's civil service, "Samdech". The same year, he became Dean of the Constitutional Council. Le Monde correspondent, Jean-Claude Pomonti, in a personal interview, quoted Chau Sen Cocsal as having "little affinity with the current Cambodian regime", assessing that its leadership "had almost sold Cambodia to the Vietnamese". Chhum retired a second time from public office in 2007. His decorations include Grand Croix de l'Ordre Royal (Cambodia) and Commandeur de la Légion d'honneur (France).

== Death ==
On 22 January 2009, at the age of 103, Cambodia's last remaining civil servant from the French Administration and the Sangkum Reastr Niyum died peacefully, surrounded by his family. Chau Sen Cocsal Chhum was publicly cremated with full military guard and honour. He was saluted by official communiqués by King Father Norodom Sihanouk, King Norodom Sihamoni, France's Ministry of Foreign Affairs, and the Khmer Krom community. In an obituary published in the Phnom Penh Post, his family wrote that Chhum should be remembered as "a man considerate of the rights of others, small or tall", who "always had kind words for the anonymous faces tirelessly serving the high and mighty. For Samdech Chhum thought of himself as a mere servant." A few years before his death, Chhum had already asked his grandson to convey his apologies to the population of Phnom Penh for the traffic congestion that his long funeral cortege would cause. "To have served dutifully and unfailingly was his greatest pride." From 10 June 2004, when former Greek Prime Minister Xenophon Zolotas died, until his own death, Chhum was the world's oldest living former state leader.

== Personal life ==
On 2 April 1940, Chau Sen Cocsal married Vann Thi Hai, and they had seven children.

== Notes ==
Political offices
Preceded by Nhiek Tioulong	Prime Minister of Cambodia; 1962	Succeeded by Norodom Kantol
