= Centre international de formation européenne =

European higher education institute

- CIFE Centre international de formation européenne
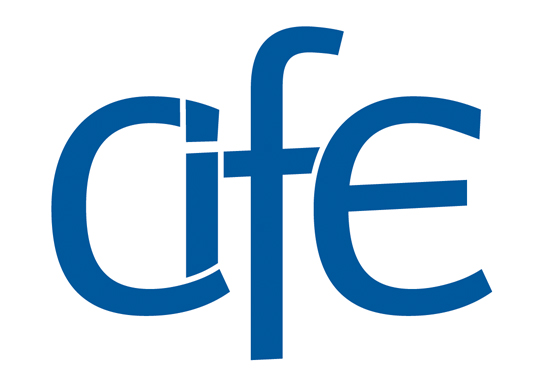
- Type: Private postgraduate institute
- Established: 1954
- Founder: Alexandre Marc
- President: Herman Van Rompuy
- Vice-president: Dominique Ristori, Esther Zana-Nau
- Director: Matthias Waechter
- Postgraduates: Annually ca. 200 students from over 50 countries
- Location: Nice, France; Berlin, Germany; Brussels, Belgium; Istanbul, Turkey; 43.6949°N 7.2571°E
- Working languages: English, French, German
- Website: www.cife.eu

CIFE - the Centre international de formation européenne is a not-for-profit European institution of higher education and research established in 1954. CIFE encompasses educational and research activities promoting European integration and governance, multilingualism and student mobility. CIFE educates European and international students as future Policy Officers in European institutions and international organisations (Chargé de mission en organisations européennes et internationales), a professional title which is recognised by the French state.

CIFE's activities include Master programmes, summer university programmes, executive training, conferences, seminars and publications.

CIFE has its head office in Nice (France) and branch offices in Berlin (Germany), Brussels (Belgium) and Istanbul (Turkey). The teaching and working languages are English, French and German. The institute is one of the six institutions to receive an operating grant from the European Commission under the Jean Monnet Programme of the Erasmus+ programme. Jean Monnet Activities are designed to promote excellence in teaching and research of the European Union studies worldwide. The activities aim at fostering the dialogue between the academic world and policy makers, particularly with the aim of enhancing governance of EU policies.

The former President of the European Council and Prime Minister of Belgium, Herman Van Rompuy, has been President of CIFE since January 26, 2018. He succeeded Philippe Maystadt, former President of the European Investment Bank appointed in January 2015 and died in December 2017, and Jean-Claude Juncker, CIFE President from 2005 until his election as President of the European Commission in 2014.

== European Higher Education ==
CIFE's motto is "Learning and living Europe". With a mobile faculty and an established network of international partners it encourages the mobility of its students: participants rotate their study locations each trimester from France (Nice) to Germany (Berlin), the United Kingdom (Canterbury), Turkey (Istanbul), Italy (Rome) and Tunisia (Tunis). Each programme allows students to live in different countries and experience various aspects of European integration and foreign politics, also allowing them to develop their language skills and other soft skills.

Teaching at CIFE is based on problem-focused learning. Teaching methods include workshops, simulations, policy tracking negotiation training, intercultural awareness, project cycle management, and public speaking. International guest lecturers, experts from various European and international organisations, as well as researchers from partner institutions contribute to these teaching modules.

The French state has recognised CIFE's graduate programmes as a qualification at Master level (level 7 EQF). CIFE graduates receive the qualification "Policy Officer in European and International Organisations". The accrediting body (France Compétences) verifies that at least three quarters of CIFE's graduates work in professional fields covered by this qualification. They work as Senior officials in European institutions, policy officers within the UN framework, administrators, diplomats, consultants, researchers for think tanks, lobbyists, and academic experts.

== History ==
Alexandre Marc, recognised by some scholars as one of the most renowned founding fathers of European Federalism established CIFE as an educational institution where federalist ideas would be taught as a remedy against the oppression of individual liberty by both socialist collectivism and extreme nationalism. In 1964, CIFE founded its own post-graduate institute, the European Institute of High International Studies (IEHEI), with the support of the City of Nice and the European Commission. Since its foundation, the institute has formed multiple ties of cooperation with universities notably in Germany, Italy, Turkey and Central and Eastern Europe to deliver academic education of international impact. The institute is actively constituted by an international faculty, consisting of university professors and experts from all over the world. CIFE is proud to increasingly endorse diversity year after year with an international student body made up by people of various distinguished backgrounds. In 2013, Matthias Waechter succeeded to Hartmut Marhold as Director General, who has led the institution since 2002 and who continues to work at CIFE as Director of research and development.

== Teaching and Research activities ==
=== Master in Advanced European and International Studies ===
The Master in Advanced European and International Studies is a one-year advanced master's study programmes designed for students who have at least completed their undergraduate studies with obtained academic degrees equivalent to or higher than a full-time Bachelor's. The programmes focus on European and International studies. Aimed at giving students an encompassing vision of the political, social, economic, and cultural issues of modern world, the programme has the unique feature of promoting European mobility of its students. There are three branches available, each of them designed to allowing the students to live in different countries and experience different aspects of European integration and foreign politics, also allowing them to develop, inter alia, languages' knowledge and other soft skills. This master's study programme is divided into the following branches by the unique characteristics of the faculty, the curriculum, the locations of lectures and the students. At the end of the programme, the participants are required to independently complete and successfully defend a qualified master's thesis which strictly conforms to contemporary international academic standards and requirements at the directorship of a member of the faculty.

==== The Trilingual Studies branch (English, French, German) ====
Established over 40 years ago, the Trilingual branch of the Master in Advanced European and International Studies is the longest-standing educational programme of CIFE. Over the years, more than 2000 students, from over 100 countries, have followed this course. It is known to be one of the few master's programmes in European and International Studies where the languages of instruction are three: French, English, and German. The programme of the Trilingual branch includes terms in Nice, Berlin and Canterbury. A study trip to the European and international institutions completes the programme. The approaches adopted in this programme offer students and educators alike with enriching perspectives: in Nice, the French vision of Europe prevails; in Berlin the perspective on Central and Eastern Europe is approached, from a standpoint which allows to analyse the Enlargement of the European Union process. Overall, the Trilingual branch seeks to offer the students insight into the fundamental elements of European integration: French-German relations.

==== The European Integration and Global Studies branch ====
The Anglophone branch started in October 2005, at the very moment the negotiations for the Accession of Turkey to the European Union began. To help the students analysing this process, the programme includes terms in Istanbul, Nice and Berlin, and it is complemented by a study trip to European and international organisations in Europe. In Istanbul, the process of the Europeanization of Turkey is a central topic, together with the neighbourhood policies and external relations of the European Union with the Caucasus countries and Central Asia. In Nice, the students continue to be cultivated with topics of both historical and contemporary significance with the help of distinguished professors, experts and current and former employees of EU bodies, governments and international organisations EU-wide; they undergo mid-term examinations and are taken to selected EU institutions international organisations and governments for formal visits. And in Berlin, the students prepare themselves for final examinations and thesis drafting. Meanwhile, they are encouraged to participate in academic activities held across Berlin by various universities and organisations. Successful candidates graduate with Master in Advanced European and International Studies, 60 ECTS credits.

==== The Mediterranean Studies branch - (English and French) ====
To follow the evolution of international context triggered by the events of the Arab Spring, in March 2015 a Memorandum of understanding was signed by CIFE and the Université internationale de Tunis, which lead to the creation of a Mediterranean branch of the Master, with study-locations Nice, Tunis and Istanbul.
