= CIFE European Institute =

Institut européen·European Institute
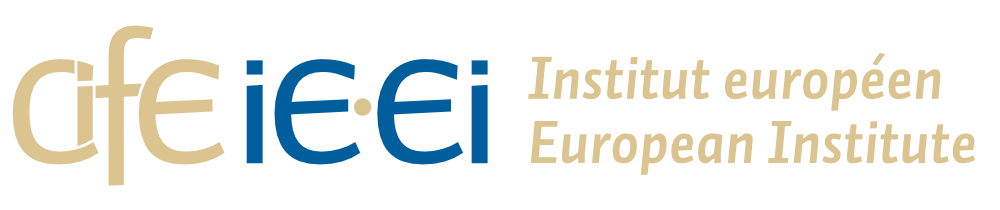

Location
- 81, Rue de France; Nice, France

Information
- Former name: Institut européen des hautes études internationales (IEHEI)
- Established: 1964; 62 years ago
- Director: Matthias Waechter
- Key people: Alexandre Marc, Claude Nigoul, Ferdinand Kinsky
- Website: www.ie-ei.eu

The European Institute (EI) is an international institution of graduate studies and research, based in Nice, France. It is a department of the Centre international de formation européenne (CIFE).

== History ==
The Institut européen-European Institute (CIFE IE-EI) programmes mainly focus on European and international studies. The programmes were launched in 1964 with the support of the Municipality of Nice and the European Commission, formerly held by the "Institut européen des hautes études internationales". As a department of the CIFE, the Institut européen-European Institute (IE-EI) aims to perpetuate the teaching of the Master level programmes in European and higher international studies.

== Studies ==
The institute cooperates with numerous universities in central and eastern Europe, especially in Germany, Italy, and Turkey.

It features an international faculty, which consist of university professors, experts and an equally multicultural student body.

The institute offers The Master in Advanced European and International Studies in three different branches: the trilingual studies branch, the European integration and global studies branch, and the mediterranean branch. Its aim is to give students an all-embracing, encompassing vision of the political, social, economic, and cultural problems of today’s modern world. Students who successfully complete the programme acquire 60 ECTS credits.(or 90 ECTS if they opt for the professional internship module)

All programmes aim to offer university-level education oriented towards the professional world. They are open to students of all disciplines and nationalities who have completed a second cycle of higher education. The Master level programmes all award the professional title of "Policy officer in European and international organisations", recognised by the French state.

== The Master in Advanced European and International Studies (MAEIS) ==
The curriculum is divided into three sections. These diplomas are structured around four basic modules oriented towards International Relations, European Construction, Democracy and Society and/or Federalism, in addition to professional workshops and specialisation modules based on the branches of study. They are all itinerant: taught in different places over one academic year.

=== The Trilingual Studies Branch ===
The trilingual branch of the MAEIS comprises terms in Nice and Berlin and Canterbury –at the University of Kent– which cooperates with the ' CIFE IE·EI', and a study trip to European and international organisations in Brussels, Luxembourg and Strasbourg. It is the only Master’s program in European and International Studies taught in three languages (French, English, and German).

=== The European integration and Global Studies Branch ===
This anglophone branch of the MAEIS contains study visits in Berlin, Nice, Rome or Istanbul. Further this branch contains a study trip to European and international organisations in Brussels, Strasbourg and Luxembourg.

=== The Mediterranean Studies Branch ===
This bilingual programme is taught in English and French with terms in Nice, Tunis, Istanbul and a study trip in Rome. It aims to provide academic training by developing contemporary issues and debates focusing on Euro-Mediterranean relations.

== Summer Academies ==
The CIFE arranges Summer University programmes taught in English and/or French in various European countries. These are typically of short duration and organized during the summer months. In collaboration with the teaching staff of the IE-EI and local partner universities, the training courses enable researchers or young professionals to deepen their knowledge in the fields of European integration, international relations and the latest topical issues.

== Other Activities ==
Club de Nice - Énergie et géopolitique

Identité européenne
