= List of truth and reconciliation commissions =

A truth commission or truth and reconciliation commission is a commission tasked with discovering and revealing past wrongdoing by a government (or, depending on the circumstances, non-state actors also), in the hope of resolving conflict left over from the past. They are, under various names, occasionally set up by states emerging from periods of internal unrest, civil war, or dictatorship.

== List by country ==
Algeria
The Ad Hoc Inquiry Commission in Charge of the Question of Disappearances formed in 2003 to investigate human rights violations that occurred in the 1990s.
Argentina
Created by President of Argentina Raúl Alfonsín on 15 December 1983, the National Commission on the Disappearance of Persons (Comisión Nacional sobre la Desaparición de Personas) investigated human rights violations, including 30,000 forced disappearances, committed during the Dirty War. The research of the commission, documented in the Never Again (Nunca Más) report, included individual cases on 9,000 disappeared persons. The report was delivered to Alfonsín on 20 September 1984 and opened the door to the Trial of the Juntas, the first major trial held for war crimes since the Nuremberg trials in Germany following World War II and the first to be conducted by a civilian court.
Australia
In March 2021, the state of Victoria announced the creation of the first commission of inquiry in Australia into the "violent dispossession and genocide of Aboriginal people during colonisation".
Bangladesh
War Crimes Fact Finding Committee, set up in Bangladesh to investigate the Human rights abuses carried out during the Bangladesh Liberation War.
Bolivia
The National Commission of Inquiry into Disappearances was the first of a series of Latin American commissions. It formed in 1982 but did not complete its report.
Brazil
The non-punitive National Truth Commission (Comissão Nacional da Verdade) was approved in late 2011 by the Federal Senate and sanctioned by President Dilma Rousseff. The commission will last for two years and consist of seven members appointed by the President. Members of the commission will have access to all government files about the 1946–1988 period and may convene victims or people accused of violations for testimony, although it will not be mandatory for them to attend. After the end of the two years period, the commission will issue a report with its findings. The group will not have, however, the obligation to disclose everything they discover.
Canada
The Truth and Reconciliation Commission of Canada was a commission investigating the human rights abuses in the Canadian Indian residential school system. It ran from June 2008 through June 2015.
Chad
formed a Commission of Inquiry into Crimes and Misappropriations committed by former president Hissene Habre in 1990 which reported there had been 40,000 killings and 200,000 cases of torture under Habre's rule.
Colombia
The National Commission for Reparation and Reconciliation (Comisión Nacional de Reparación y Reconciliación) existed in 2007, and the Special Jurisdiction for Peace was created in 2016.
Congo (Democratic Republic)
A peace agreement in 2004 mandated the Truth and Reconciliation Commission (DRC) which issued an administrative report in 2007.
Chile
The National Truth and Reconciliation Commission (Comisión Nacional de Verdad y Reconciliación; popularly known as the "Rettig Report"), created in April 1990, investigated deaths and disappearances, particularly for political reasons, under Augusto Pinochet's rule. The report was released in 1991. The National Commission on Political Imprisonment and Torture ("Valech Report") also investigated human rights abuses from the reign of Pinochet. Released in 2004 and 2005, the commission differed from the previous one in that it investigated non-fatal violations of human rights, such as torture, and also covered children whose parents had disappeared or been killed. The report of this commission was used by the government of Chile to give out pensions and other benefits to survivors.
Czech Republic
The Office for the Documentation and the Investigation of the Crimes of Communism (Úřad dokumentace a vyšetřování zločinů komunismu) is a subdivision of Czech criminal police which investigates criminal acts from the period 1948-1989 which were unsolvable for political reasons during the Czechoslovak communist regime.
Ecuador
The Truth Commission (La Comisión de la Verdad) was established by the government to investigate the violation of human rights especially during the period of 1984 to 1988.
El Salvador
Established by the United Nations (instead of the Government of El Salvador), the establishment of the Commission on the Truth for El Salvador (Comisión de la Verdad para El Salvador) was part of Chapultepec Peace Accords to end the Salvadoran Civil War. The commission investigated murders and executions committed during the war, including that of Óscar Romero in 1980 and six Jesuits in 1989.
Fiji
Reconciliation and Unity Commission.
Finland
In October 2021, Finland established a truth and reconciliation commission to gather the experiences of the Sámi people of the actions of the Finnish authorities and investigate their consequences for the Sámi. The commission published its final report on 4 December 2025.
Gambia
The Truth, Reconciliation and Reparations Commission (TRRC) Act was enacted by the National Assembly in December 2017 to investigate human rights violations during the period of Yahya Jammeh's rule. It was sworn in on October 15, 2018.
Germany
Created a Commission of inquiry into crimes of the SED in East Germany after unification in 1992.
Ghana
National Reconciliation Commission.
Guatemala
Historical Clarification Commission (Comisión para el Esclarecimiento Histórico).
Haiti
The Haitian National Truth and Justice Commission.
Honduras
The Honduras Truth and Reconciliation Commission investigated events around the 2009 Honduras coup d'état.
Ireland
Forum for Peace and Reconciliation, launched in 1994 sought to reconcile communities in conflict in Northern Ireland.
Kenya
Waki Commission; The Truth, Justice and Reconciliation Commission of Kenya.
Liberia
Truth and Reconciliation Commission.
Mauritius
The Truth and Justice Commission of the Mauritius was an independent truth commission established in 2009, which explored the impact of slavery and indentured servitude in Mauritius. The commission was tasked to investigate the dispossession of land, and “determine appropriate measures to be extended to descendants of slaves and indentured laborers.” It was “unique in that it [dealt] with socio-economic class abuses" and explored the possibility of reparations. The Commission attempted to cover more than 370 years, the longest period of time that a truth commission has ever covered.
Morocco
Equity and Reconciliation Commission (IER).
Nepal
Nepalese Truth Commission reported in 1991 on the period 1961–1990. A new Commission on Investigation of Disappeared Persons (CIDP) formed on 10 February 2015.
New Zealand
Established in 1975, the Waitangi Tribunal is a judicial body consistent with a truth commission which makes recommendations on claims brought to the tribunal by Māori relating to legislation, policy, actions or inactions by the Crown that are purported to be in breach of the 1840 Treaty of Waitangi.
Nigeria
A Human Rights Violations Investigation Commission formed in 1999 and reported in 2002.
Norway
In 2018, a Norwegian truth commission was formed to investigate the experiences of Sámi and Kven (Norwegian Finns) subject to Norwegian authorities' policies of Norwegianization. On 9 May 2019, the commission's mandate was extended to include also the Forest Finns. The commission submitted its report on 1 June 2023.
Panama
The Panama Truth Commission (Comisión de la Verdad) was established in 2000 and reported that the former military regime had engaged in torture and other forms of cruel, inhuman, and degrading treatment.
Paraguay
Truth and Justice Commission (Comisión de Verdad y Justicia).
Peru
Truth and Reconciliation Commission (Comisión de la Verdad y Reconciliación).
Poland
Institute of National Remembrance, for historical research and lustration
Philippines
In 2010, President Benigno Aquino III announced that a Philippines Truth Commission would be formed to investigate unresolved issues concerning the previous administration of President Gloria Macapagal Arroyo. On July 30, 2010, a month after being sworn in as the 15th President of the Philippines, Aquino signed Executive Order No. 1, creating the Philippine Truth Commission of 2010. However, the Supreme Court of the Philippines invalidated the executive order because of its apparent transgression of the equal protection clause for singling out the Arroyo administration. In his ponencia in Biraogo vs. Truth Commission, Justice Jose C. Mendoza blatantly tagged Aquino's Truth Commission "as a vehicle for vindictiveness and selective retribution."
Rwanda
International non-governmental organizations created an International Commission of Investigation on Human Rights Violations in Rwanda since October 1, 1990 that reported in 1993; it did not advance afterwards due to the Rwandan genocide of 1994. A new National Unity and Reconciliation Commission formed in 1999 to promote reconciliation after the genocide.
Seychelles
Truth, Reconciliation and National Unity Commission is to investigate complaints of alleged human rights violations committed in relation to the 1977 Coup.
Sierra Leone
After the end of the Sierra Leone civil war in 1999, the country created a Sierra Leone Truth and Reconciliation Commission which reported that both sides had targeted civilians, including children, and called for improvements in democratic institutions and accountability.
Solomon Islands
Truth and Reconciliation Commission. On April 29, 2009, a Truth and Reconciliation Commission was launched by the Government of the Solomon Islands. Its aim would be to "address people’s traumatic experiences during the five year ethnic conflict on Guadalcanal (1999–2003)". It is modelled on the Truth and Reconciliation Commission of South Africa. Its public hearings commenced in March 2010.
South Africa
After the transition from apartheid, President Nelson Mandela authorized a truth commission under the leadership of former Anglican Archbishop Desmond Tutu to study the effects of apartheid in that country. The commission was simply called the Truth and Reconciliation Commission.
South Korea
The Presidential Truth Commission on Suspicious Deaths in the Republic of Korea reported in 2004. A second Truth and Reconciliation Commission opened in 2005. There has also been a local truth commission for Jeju island.
Sri Lanka
Lessons Learnt and Reconciliation Commission. After an 18-month inquiry, the commission submitted its report to the President on 15 November 2011. The report was made public on 16 December 2011, after being tabled in the parliament.
Sweden
In March 2020, Swedish government decided to appoint a truth commission to investigate violations and abuses against Tornedalians, Kvens and Lantalaiset. The commission submitted its report on 15 November 2023.: Another truth commission was formed to investigate past abuse of the Sámi by the Swedish state. The members of the commission were appointed in 2022, and its report is due on 1 December 2025.
Taiwan
Transitional Justice Commission (促進轉型正義委員會) is an independent government agency responsible for the investigation of injustices committed by the government between 15 August 1945 and 6 November 1992, including the February 28 Incident as well as White Terror.
Timor-Leste (East Timor)
Commission for Reception, Truth and Reconciliation in East Timor (Comissão de Acolhimento, Verdade e Reconciliação de Timor Leste; 2001–2005); Indonesia–Timor Leste Commission of Truth and Friendship (2005–2008).
Togo
Truth, Justice and Reconciliation Commission established in 2009 to investigate the period from 1958 to 2009.
Tunisia
Truth and Dignity Commission (2014)
Uganda
Uganda Commission of Inquiry into Violations of Human Rights (1986–1994).
Ukraine
Ukrainian Institute of National Remembrance (Український інститут національної пам'яті), founded by President Viktor Yushchenko in 2006.
Uruguay
The Investigative Commission on the Situation of Disappeared People and its Causes operated in 1985 and produced a report covering the years 1972–1983. A new Peace Commission was authorized by the president to look into the same period, and reported in 2003.
United Kingdom
Many local areas have established poverty truth commissions to help political leaders and decision-makers to understand the true experiences of people in their localities living in poverty. For example, Gateshead's Poverty Truth Commission says that its membership is "made up of 'experts by experience' of poverty".
United States
The Greensboro Truth and Reconciliation Commission was a non-governmental body that ran in 2004–2006 to investigate deadly events in the city that took place around 3 November 1979 and came to be known as the Greensboro Massacre. The Maine Wabanaki-State Truth and Reconciliation Commission investigated child welfare issues among the Wabanaki peoples.
Yugoslavia (Federal Republic of)
A Commission of Truth and Reconciliation was created in 2001 but did not complete its report.

== Multinational ==
Bulgaria / North Macedonia
A commission for historical and educational issues was created by the mutually signed relations regulation agreement in 2019 but still did not complete its report.

== See also ==
- Truth and Reconciliation Commission (disambiguation)
- Truth Commission (disambiguation)
