= Swedification =

Spread of the Swedish language and culture

Swedification (Swedish: försvenskning) is the spread and/or imposition of the Swedish language and Swedish culture to people who speak another language, either through deliberate state policy or through gradual language shift. The term also refers to policies pursuing this aim. In linguistics, it can also denote the adaptation of loanwords to Swedish spelling and grammar.

In Finland, which was part of the Swedish realm until 1809, Finnish- and German-speakers in the coastal areas and towns gradually shifted to Swedish from the Middle Ages onwards. Proposals in the 18th century to Swedify the Finnish-speaking peasantry were never carried out. The Scanian provinces, acquired from Denmark–Norway in 1658, were fully integrated into the realm only in the 1680s.

From the late 19th century, the word was used explicitly for the measures by which Swedish authorities sought to make the Finnish-speaking population of the Torne Valley Swedish in language and culture, chiefly through the school system. Officially the aim was bilingualism, but in practice the policy, which also affected the Sámi, was one of assimilation. By the 1970s the population of the valley had become bilingual, with Swedish the stronger language. In the second half of the 20th century, the descendants of Finnish immigrants in Sweden also shifted rapidly to Swedish.

Meänkieli, the language of the Torne Valley, became a national minority language in 2000. A truth and reconciliation commission concluded in 2023 that the Swedish state and the Church of Sweden have a moral responsibility to make amends for the damage caused by the assimilation policy. A separate commission for the Sámi was appointed in 2022. Researchers differ on how the period of Swedification should be dated and on how far the language shift was forced.

== Terminology ==
From the late 19th century, Swedish state measures in the Torne Valley were explicitly referred to as Swedification. In 1905 the governor of Norrbotten County reported on "vigorous and successful work of enlightenment and Swedification" in the Lapland and Finnish-speaking districts of the county. (Note: Swedish original: ett kraftigt och framgångsrikt upplysnings- och försvenskningsarbete inom Norrbottens lappmark och finnbygd.) Advocates of the policy also used other terms. Ludvig de Vylder, principal of the Tornedalen folk high school, called it "the Swedish work of enlightenment" and maintained in 1902 that no effort to eradicate the Finnish language existed. (Note: Swedish originals: det svenska upplysningsarbetet and Någon sträfvan att utrota finska språket existerar icke.) After the First World War, pressure from the international community meant that the concept of Swedification itself came to be questioned to some extent. In practice the policy and its effects continued, because the institutions built for it remained in place.

== Finland ==
Finland formed part of the Swedish realm from the late Middle Ages until 1809.

=== Middle Ages ===
In the archipelago of Åboland, the Finns were probably Swedified slowly while keeping their place names, which the Swedish population also accepted. Finns are known to have lived on the islands east of the Skiftet strait as late as the 16th and 17th centuries. They seem to have been finally assimilated only after the Great Wrath in the 18th century. In the northern part of the archipelago the Finns were not Swedified, and that area remained bilingual. The Finns who had lived on the coast of Ostrobothnia were likewise slowly Swedified.

The nobility of Nyland included a large German element because of the proximity of the Baltic lands. The Germans were soon Swedified, whereas the Swedish families kept their distinct character by marrying across the Gulf of Bothnia. In Viborg, as in Åbo, the Swedish element grew as some of the Finns were gradually Swedified and absorbed into the Swedish part of the population.

=== 17th and 18th centuries ===
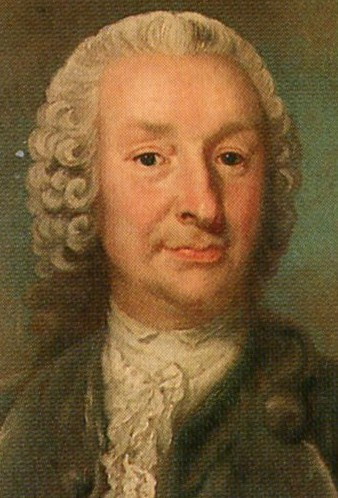
Jacob Faggot proposed in 1745 that the Finns should be taught Swedish.

In Viborg, both German- and Finnish-speakers were Swedified during the great-power era, and a Finnish-speaker who wanted to rise socially invested in a knowledge of Swedish. In Nystad, Swedish family names became fashionable in the 18th century. The custom spread from the leading burghers to the lower classes, and a person who took a Swedish surname did not necessarily speak Swedish. In the towns, it was above all the elite that was Swedified during the 18th century. In the Swedish-speaking coastal parishes of Nyland the Finnish minorities shrank, and villages in the northern parts of these parishes became Swedish-speaking.

Several proposals to Swedify the Finnish-speaking common people were put forward in the 18th century. During the Great Northern War, Israel Nesselius, a professor at the Royal Academy of Åbo, proposed that the common people should be taught to speak Swedish and that colonists should be brought over from the western part of the realm. Only the people of a couple of districts closest to Lapland could keep their language. He also wanted the sauna to be abolished, because it wasted firewood and was a deviant custom; the people were to be accustomed to Swedish ways. In a submission to the Riksdag in 1745, Jacob Faggot wrote that the Finns should be taught Swedish so as to become as good Swedes in language as they were in sentiment. The land surveyor Erik Tulindberg recommended that children in Finnish-speaking areas be taught in Swedish in the parish clerks' schools and that the priests preach in both Swedish and Finnish every Sunday. The Finnish deputation at the Riksdag of 1746–1747 considered such a policy desirable. It argued that if Swedish gained ground among the peasantry in Finland, it would be easier for people from the western part of the realm to move there. At the time, Finland's small population was considered a problem for the defence of the eastern border.

In 1750 the government in Stockholm asked Gustaf Abraham Piper, the governor in Ostrobothnia, whether the Finnish-speaking peasantry there could be Swedified. Piper ruled out coercion and was sceptical of the whole project, but saw some possibility of success if Swedish parish clerks were recruited to run Swedish schools. With the support of their bishops, the clergy in Ostrobothnian parishes with a Finnish-speaking minority made some attempts in this direction. At visitations, Finnish-speaking parents were urged to send their children to Swedish confirmation school. From Korsholm and Gamlakarleby there is information from 1804 that Finnish-speaking parents had their children "read" (läsa) Swedish. The parish clergy preferred their congregations to be as linguistically uniform as possible, as this reduced their workload. In southern Finland the priests seem to have considered it impossible to Swedify their parishioners through the confirmation schools and made no attempts. In Ostrobothnia the results were meagre. At the same time, many Finnish-speaking parents in Sjundeå and Lojo in Nyland sent their children to Swedish confirmation school of their own accord, evidently to give them a useful skill and keep open the possibility of social advancement. The local clergy were very reluctant to see the time used for learning Swedish.

No major campaign for Swedish was ever carried out among the peasantry, and Swedifying the peasantry in Finland was never a serious political option. Behind the proposals lay an instrumental view of language: a realm in which everyone spoke the same language would have made dealings between subjects in its different parts smoother. The proposals were discussed but set aside as unrealistic. In the countryside, language conditions changed in both directions, resulting in either Finnicisation or Swedification, but they were also marked by considerable stability. The area inhabited by the Swedish-speaking peasantry in the 17th century largely coincides with rural Swedish-speaking and bilingual Finland four hundred years later.

=== 19th and 20th centuries ===
E. G. Ehrström denied in his essay "Finska språket betraktat såsom nationalspråk" ("The Finnish language considered as a national language"), one of the key programmatic texts of Åbo Romanticism, that the coastal population were "Swedified Finns". In his view they were real Swedes in both language and descent. (Note: Swedish original: försvenskade Finnar, utan såväl till språk som härkomst verkliga Svenskar.)

Within the commercial elite, German- and Russian-speakers and some Finnish-speakers were Swedified. Swedish became the language of wholesale trade and a bond between the leading merchants regardless of their origin. After the 1890s the Jews of Helsingfors and Åbo were rapidly Swedified. In the late 1920s, however, Finnish was introduced as the language of instruction at the Jewish school in Helsingfors, although most Jews in Helsingfors gave Swedish as their mother tongue. The decision began a rapid Finnicisation of the Jewish population. In Viborg the county administration began to work in Swedish soon after 1812, while the schools continued to work in German until the 1840s, when they were Swedified. Finnish-speaking workers and servants had traditionally moved to the coastal areas and been Swedified there. The migration continued, but the newcomers were no longer assimilated into the Swedish-speaking population to the same extent.

Finnicisation and Swedification have taken place through small groups changing language, either under pressure from their surroundings or through mixed marriages. Such language shifts have been numerous, at least in modern times, but their effect on the number of Swedish-speakers has been small.

== Scanian provinces (1658–1680s) ==
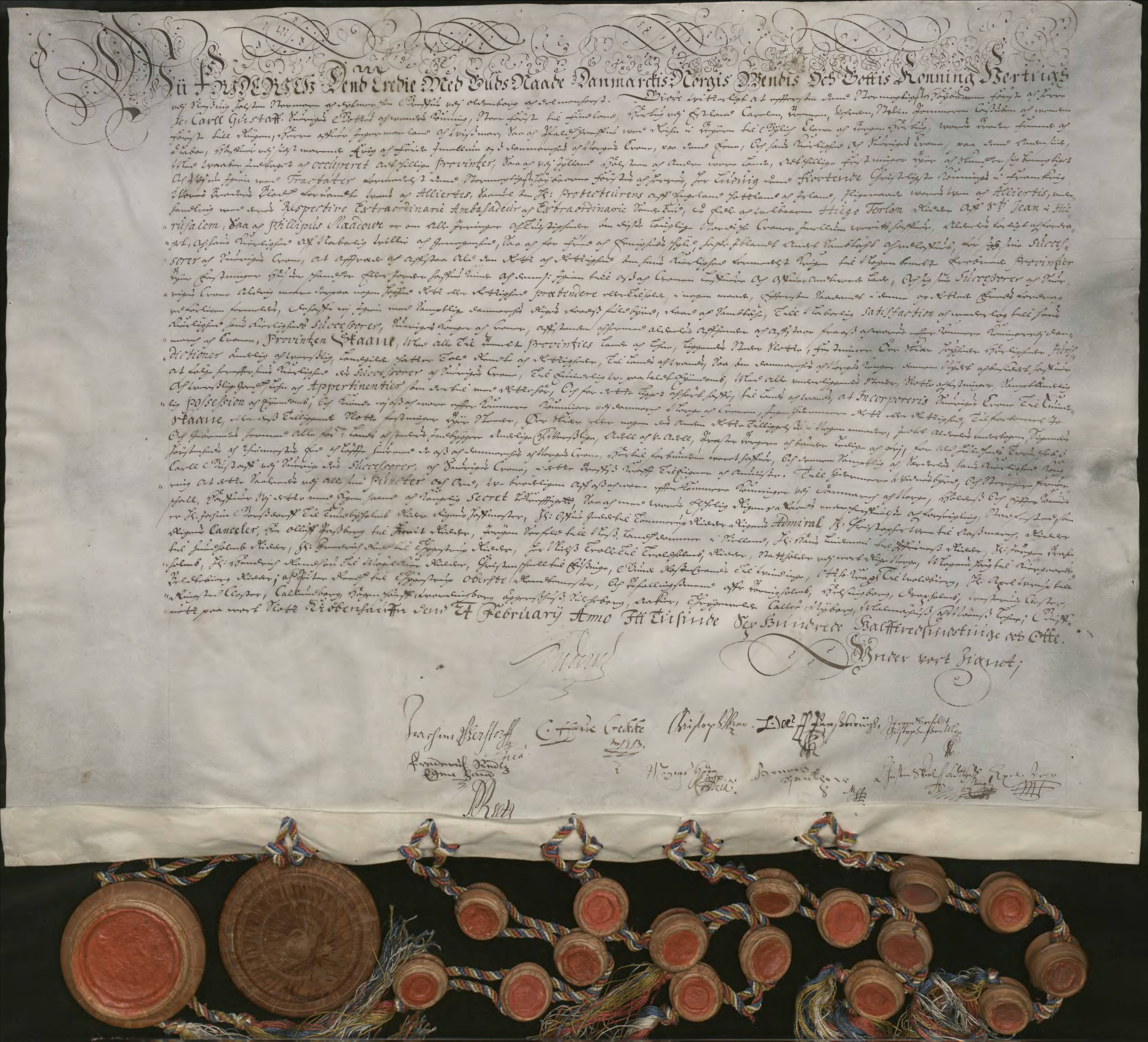
The Danish deed ceding Scania to Sweden, signed in Copenhagen on 24 February 1658

As part of the Treaty of Roskilde at the end of the Second Northern War, all areas in the historical region of Skåneland were ceded by Denmark-Norway to Sweden in early 1658. For the Swedish Empire, it was important to integrate these new subjects and to make the Scanians feel Swedish, rather than Danish. Jämtland, Härjedalen and Gotland, taken in 1645, had been integrated at once, with Swedish law and representation in the Riksdag. The Scanian provinces, by contrast, were incorporated cautiously, through negotiation between the Crown and the Scanian nobility, with the Scanians keeping their Danish laws. On 16 April 1658, representatives of Scania, Blekinge and Halland's nobility, citizens, clergy, and peasants gathered in Malmö to swear fealty to Charles X Gustav. The king was not present but was represented by an empty chair surrounded by Swedish soldiers. A new Swedish church order with services in Swedish was introduced. Lund University was founded in 1668 and went over from Latin to Swedish as its language of instruction earlier than Uppsala.

In 1662, Sweden aligned taxes and regulations in Scania with other parts of Sweden. Some of the new rules were very different from previous Danish practice; for example, the lilla tullen ("the small customs"), which charged a tax for all goods brought into cities. Other changes required each city council to have least two Swedish-born members. At the same time, inhabitants of Scania received representation in the Riksdag, unlike other areas that had been conquered by the Swedish Empire.

The population of the Scanian provinces showed disloyalty to its new rulers during the Scanian War in the 1670s, and only after that war were the provinces fully integrated into the realm. With the introduction of absolutism after 1680 they received Swedish law, courts and privileges and representation in the Riksdag. The formerly Norwegian province of Bohuslän was included in the same integration.

== Torne Valley (1809–1970s) ==
N. G. Werming's map of the border in the Torne Valley, 1809

=== Before the 1870s ===
Under the Treaty of Fredrikshamn of 1809, Sweden gave up Finland to Russia, and the new border was drawn along the Könkämä, Muonio and Torne rivers, dividing a Finnish-speaking area in two. During the first half of the 19th century there was no political opinion in favour of Swedification. Finnish was regarded as the natural language of instruction in the schools that were gradually set up in the region under the national elementary school statute of 1842, which did not regulate the language of instruction. When the first elementary schools opened in the Swedish part of the valley in 1854, they taught in Finnish and used a Finnish ABC book. The state grant for the elementary schools of the area from 1874 supported Finnish-language teaching with textbooks and Finnish-speaking teachers.

Until the end of the 18th century the dominant language of the region had been Sámi. Strong population growth during the following century made Finnish, in its northern Ostrobothnian form, the main language, and until 1949 the region was officially called Norrbotten's Finnish district (Norrbottens finnbygd). The written sources on school and language policy from the period refer to the population as "Finns" or "Tornedalians"; the names Kvens and Lantalaiset do not appear in them. The language, officially called Finnish or Tornedalian Finnish until the 1980s, is today known as Meänkieli.

=== School policy, 1870s–1920s ===
The political Swedification of the area began in the 1870s. The state and its officials, most clearly the representatives of the church and the schools, sought to bring the Finnish-speaking population culturally and linguistically into the Swedish fold. Schools and other institutions for the upbringing of children were the main tools. Officially the policy was described as aiming at bilingualism, an argument used as much to quiet the criticism from the Fennomans in Finland as to meet possible opposition among the Tornedalians. In practice it was a policy of assimilation.

In 1888 the state began to establish elementary schools that it financed entirely, on condition that Swedish was the only language of instruction. Four schools opened that year and thirteen more in 1894, placed partly at the Swedish–Finnish language boundary and partly at the national border. By 1919 almost 40 per cent of the elementary schools in the valley were state-financed, and Swedish-only instruction was gradually extended to the municipal schools as well. In many schools Finnish was also forbidden during breaks, and children who spoke it could be punished with detention or corporal punishment.

The seminary for training elementary-school teachers in Haparanda, founded in the 1870s, initially taught in Finnish. The requirement of Finnish for admission was replaced by a requirement of Swedish, Finnish was steadily reduced in the timetable, and in 1912 it was abolished both as a subject and as a language of instruction. Folk high schools were founded in Boden in 1896 and in Matarengi, now Övertorneå, in 1899, in order to modernise the countryside, spread Swedish culture and teach the Finnish-speaking population Swedish.

After the famine of 1902, work cottages (arbetsstugor) were set up in which children received food, lodging and an upbringing in Swedish culture and the Swedish language. Their regulations required that Swedish be used as the language of conversation, even during breaks, and later testimony describes children concealing their use of Finnish for fear of punishment. The work cottages remained in operation until 1954. Between 1914 and 1927, 713 children from the valley, mostly aged 12–14, were also placed with families in Swedish-speaking areas, chiefly in Norrbotten, to learn more Swedish.

Around 1900 about ten per cent of the children were still taught in Finnish; by around 1920, teaching in Finnish had in practice disappeared. During the first decades of the 20th century, new libraries in the valley were allowed to hold only Swedish literature, and existing libraries were then forbidden to provide literature in Finnish. Under its articles of association, the Tornedalen Library, founded in 1928 as part of the folk high school, was to offer the local population only Swedish books. Books in Finnish were not permitted there until the 1950s.

=== Motives ===
Several perceived threats from the east shaped the school policy: a military fear of Russia, racial-biological ideas that devalued the Meänkieli-speaking culture, a nationalist language conflict with Finland and the Church of Sweden's unease about the Laestadian revival. Laestadianism, which spread around the middle of the 19th century, used Finnish as its religious language and formed a community that extended into Finland. It was therefore perceived as a threat to the influence of the Church of Sweden in Norrbotten, especially in view of the language-nationalist ideas of the Fennoman movement in Finland.

From the mid-1880s the Torne Valley came to be seen as an area of great national importance. Fear of Russia dominated the debate on defence and security, and suspicion spread about the loyalty of the Finnish-speaking minority in the event of war. A government bill on railway construction in 1897 argued that a railway would bind the border population more closely to the rest of the country and spread the Swedish language and culture there. Boden Fortress was built between 1900 and 1916. King Oscar II regarded Swedification as a necessary defence against the Fennomans and against the spread of Finnish on the Swedish side of the border.

The Fennoman movement in Finland criticised the increasing Swedification of schooling in the Swedish part of the valley. The criticism had the opposite effect: it reinforced the belief in Swedification, and the Swedish central government sharpened its measures. Around 1920, during the Åland Islands dispute, a body formed by the Finnish nationalist movement in northern Finland, the Västerbotten Committee (Länsipohjan toimikunta), proposed that Finland exchange Åland for Norrbotten's Finnish district. The committee had been founded in Tornio in 1919, and some of its members aimed to revise the border of 1809. The Finnish government never advocated this solution, yet it contributed to the Swedish state tightening its grip on the Finnish-speaking population.

=== After the First World War ===
From 1917 the authorities increasingly stressed that the aim was to make the population bilingual, not to suppress Finnish. A communication from the Riksdag in 1917 stated that anything that could involve or give the appearance of oppression of the population should be carefully avoided. At the same time, the share of state-financed Swedish-language schools continued to grow, and the introduction of Swedish teaching materials accelerated from 1925. In 1919 the government appointed an inquiry into the elementary schools of the Finnish-speaking area, chaired by Bishop Olof Bergqvist. Its report of 1921 claimed that the area had originally been Swedish-speaking and had later been Finnicised, and that the present population did not want any Finnish-language teaching. Walde Lorens Wanhainen, a member of the inquiry and himself a Tornedalian, disputed both claims and preferred a programme of bilingualism.

In 1935 the Riksdag decided to allow voluntary teaching of Finnish, but only in the continuation school. Because of this restriction, and because Finnish was still associated with disloyalty to the Swedish nation state, the teaching gained little ground. In 1940 the state schools became ordinary parish schools. Finnish became an optional subject in upper secondary school in 1944, although such teaching began in practice only in 1955. After reports of local bans on speaking Finnish, the National Board of Education stated in 1957 that such bans were not permitted. From 1962 Finnish could be studied in the seventh and eighth grades.

In the 1930s, Finnish nationalists compared the language policy in the Torne Valley with the Soviet Russification of the Finnish-speaking population of Ingria. The education policy of the region nevertheless did not change noticeably in substance. As the population did not oppose the assimilation either, it had become bilingual by the beginning of the 1970s, with Swedish clearly the stronger language. Between 1930 and 1970 the population of the region fell from 33,000 to 25,000. Although more than 20,000 of them understood Finnish according to a media survey in the early 1970s, this knowledge was usually passive. This was not solely a result of the Swedification policy: the mining industry attracted people from other parts of Sweden, and the sparse population made it difficult to mobilise support for a Finnish-speaking culture. The first critical study of the policy was published in Sweden in the 1960s by Hugo Tenerz, a school principal from the valley.

== Sámi (1850s–1930s) ==
Teacher and pupils at the Sámi school in Vaisaluokta, Lapland, in the 1950s

In the Swedish censuses, "Lapps" were recorded every ten years from 1855 and "Finns", meaning the Tornedalians, from 1860. Both categories were determined by a mixture of descent, way of life and language. The census of 1930 was the last in which "Finns" were counted as a separate ethnic group. In 1875 a seminary was founded at Mattisudden to train teachers proficient in Sámi.

The nomad school for the children of reindeer-herding mountain Sámi was introduced in 1913 on the proposal of Bishop Olof Bergqvist. It was based on a clearly segregationist ideology ("a Lapp shall be a Lapp") (Note: Swedish: lapp ska vara lapp.), yet instruction was to be given mainly in Swedish, which was a feature of an assimilationist ideology. The emphasis of racial biology on separation and segregation was one of the motives for creating the nomad school. Sámi and Finnish place names were Swedified, first along the Iron Ore Line between Gällivare and Riksgränsen and later when the railway was extended into the Torne Valley. The efforts in this field were not uniform. The county administration wanted only Swedish names, whereas the Railway Board and ultimately the government partly followed a cultural-historical line, and some places kept their Finnish names.

== Sweden Finns (since the 1960s) ==
Hundreds of thousands of Finns emigrated to Sweden in the 1960s and 1970s. Emigration peaked at the end of the 1960s, with up to 40,000 emigrants a year. The second and third generations of these Sweden Finns have been rapidly Swedified. This has happened despite improved opportunities for teaching in their mother tongue, and although the Sweden Finnish minority has been at least ten times larger than the Tornedalians and has built up a relatively dynamic cultural sector. Compared with the general population, the Finnish immigrants were long perceived as poor and uneducated, which contributed to subsequent generations seldom wishing to emphasise their Finnish roots. One concrete expression of this was rapid language shift, another that many chose to Swedify their surnames. The standing of the minority rose as it assimilated. Choosing Swedish brought greater opportunities for social acceptance and advancement. In 1990 only ten per cent of second-generation descendants of Finnish immigrants gave Finnish as their mother tongue.

Since 2010, municipalities have been able to join an administrative area for Finnish, in which Sweden Finns have, among other things, the right to use Finnish with the authorities and the courts. Most of the second and third generation, however, do not have even a passive knowledge of Finnish. Meinander notes that Finnish is still perceived as the language of the periphery and of immigrants, in short as a low-status language. The Swedification of the Sweden Finnish population has gone hand in hand with a rise in its education, income and social standing.

== Legacy and reconciliation ==
In the 1970s the state began to offer home-language teaching to immigrant children, an opportunity widely used by Finnish immigrant children in the Torne Valley's schools. The standard Finnish taught there differed markedly from the local dialect, which strengthened the sense among Tornedalians that they spoke a language of their own, Meänkieli. In the 1980s this gave rise to an ethnic revival. The National Association of Swedish Tornedalians (STR-T) was founded in 1981, and in 1988 the minority declared Meänkieli its own language. Following a decision of the Riksdag in 1999, Meänkieli became one of Sweden's five national minority languages in 2000. Under the law that then came into force, the inhabitants of six municipalities in the north-east of Sweden gained the right to use Meänkieli with the authorities and to receive preschool education and elderly care in the language. They also gained the right to bilingual teaching in Meänkieli and Swedish in compulsory school. The Language Act of 2009 lists Finnish, Yiddish, Meänkieli, Romani and Sámi as Sweden's national minority languages.

A preliminary study by STR-T and the youth organisation Met Nuoret, Då var jag som en fånge ("Then I was like a prisoner"), recorded testimony about the work cottages and formed the basis of the later commission. On 19 March 2020 the government appointed a truth and reconciliation commission to investigate the assimilation policy pursued by the Swedish state and the Church of Sweden against Tornedalians, Kvens and Lantalaiset in the 19th and 20th centuries. Its final report, Som om vi aldrig funnits ("As if we never existed"), was submitted in November 2023. The commission interviewed 166 people in 160 interviews and commissioned twelve research reports.

Many interviewees who had attended school in the first half of the 20th century said that they knew no Swedish when they started school, and some said that they were punished if they spoke Finnish. The ban on using Finnish ended only in the 1950s, and home-language tuition was introduced in 1977. Many of those who had stayed at work cottages reported violence, rights violations and mistreatment, although some had more positive experiences. The commission concluded that the state and the Church of Sweden have a moral responsibility to make amends for the damage that the assimilation policy caused the minority. Among other things, it proposed that the government acknowledge the violations without delay, enter into a dialogue with the minority about a public apology, and appoint an inquiry into the minority's status as an indigenous people.

In November 2022 the Swedish government appointed the Truth Commission for the Sámi People to investigate past policies towards the Sámi and their consequences.

== Historiography ==
The linguists Kenneth Hyltenstam and Linus Salö describe the Swedification of the Torne Valley as a project, a term meant to emphasise the part played by many different actors in building the nation state. Linguistic Swedification has sometimes been seen as a by-product of a broader cultural Swedification connected with the emergence of a Swedish nation. According to Hyltenstam and Salö, however, the dominant view among sociolinguists today is that language is one of the most effective means of incorporating a territory into a national community. In their analysis, the policy rested on an infrastructure of Swedification. This consisted of material installations such as railways and buildings for schools, defence and administration, and of social institutions such as the education system and its regulations. The railway in Norrbotten carried ore south, but in the other direction it was seen as a means of spreading Swedish culture, the Swedish language and Swedish-speaking teachers. Because the policy was pursued in parallel in schools, defence and communications, it could appear systematically coordinated without being centrally orchestrated. Following the sociologist Rogers Brubaker, they also distinguish between transitive assimilation, which is carried out on population groups or individuals, and intransitive assimilation, which is carried out by them. Once a process of assimilation has started, the two can interact.

Assessments of the Scanian provinces differ. Hyltenstam and Salö describe them, together with Jämtland and Härjedalen, as having undergone a fairly rapid process of Swedification, and see the founding of Lund University as a way of accelerating it. Historians have stressed the limits of the integration. The historian Nils Erik Villstrand notes that efforts at homogenisation occurred at times within the Swedish conglomerate state, most strongly under the absolutism of Charles XI and Charles XII, but that they followed no grand plan. The ideal was a unitary state with uniformity in law, administration and politics, not, as in a nation state, in ethnicity, culture or language. Religion, law, language and customs were regarded as four bonds holding the realm together, and the lack of one of them was usually considered something one could live with. The historian Martin Hårdstedt writes that older, more nationalist research spoke of an attempt to make the Danes Swedish, but that this view does not match how historians understand the incorporation today.

For the Torne Valley, the dating of the period of Swedification varies. Hyltenstam and Salö place it between 1880 and the end of the 1950s and divide it into two phases. During a build-up phase until the 1920s, representatives of the state purposefully created an infrastructure for Swedification. During a full-scale phase from the 1920s to the 1950s, the rhetoric was milder but the policy took full effect. Meinander describes the strict Swedification policy as lasting until the 1970s. Tenerz, Nils Slunga and Lars Elenius describe the school inquiry's report of 1921 as an attempt to legitimise the Swedification policy, one that required a considerable distortion of history.

Researchers have also discussed whether the language shift was forced or voluntary. Hyltenstam and Salö consider it very difficult to know what was done against the will of the population. There was, they argue, no common will, and claims about the population's will were frequently invoked, without real evidence, to legitimise the policy. The truth and reconciliation commission found that during the first part of the 20th century the assimilation policy was by and large accepted within the minority, and that there was no collective ethnopolitical organisation. Individuals in leadership positions nevertheless promoted bilingualism in various ways.

== In linguistics ==
In linguistics, Swedification also refers to the adaptation of loanwords to Swedish spelling or inflection. The Swedish Academy's word list, Svenska Akademiens ordlista, has often given a Swedified alternative to foreign words, partly as a way of testing whether a spelling according to Swedish sound values would catch on. Some Swedified forms, such as flopp and webb, have been successful, while others, such as hitt and cupp, have met more resistance. The form jos (for juice) was removed from the twelfth edition of the word list because it had no support in actual usage. When Catharina Grünbaum, the language consultant of Dagens Nyheter, advocated the spelling rejv instead of rave, people were upset, but the newspaper adopted the new spelling consistently.

== See also ==
- Germanisation
- Norwegianization
