= National Unity and Reconciliation Commission (Rwanda) =

In 1999, Rwanda began its National Unity and Reconciliation Commission (NURC) in order to work towards a reconciliation of the conflicting parties involved in the Rwandan Civil War and the Rwandan genocide, with the eventual goal of reunifying the country’s citizens. The passage of the Government of National Unity Law No. 03/99 provided for the establishment of the National Unity and Reconciliation Commission, which became a permanent body in 2002, and continues its function to the present day. As its name suggests, the Commission is intended to promote unity and reconciliation amongst the former opponents present in the Rwandan population.

A common misconception is that the International Criminal Tribunal for Rwanda (ICTR) is associated with the National Unity and Reconciliation Commission. On the contrary, the ICTR and its prosecutions are initiatives of the United Nations Security Council, and are not associated with the Commission or its objectives. The work of this Commission also should not be confused with that of the International Panel of Eminent Personalities to Investigate the 1994 Genocide in Rwanda and the Surrounding Events created by the Organization of African Unity in 1998. It is also distinct from the National Commission for the Fight against Genocide, which was established by the Rwandan government in 2007.

== Historical background ==
From October 1990 to July 1992, the Rwandan Patriotic Front (RPF) took on Rwandan government forces in a brutal Civil War fueled by ethnic tensions between the Hutu and Tutsi peoples. Conflict appeared to have ended with a ceasefire in July 1992, and the Arusha Accords signed August 4, 1993, but quickly reignited after the assassination of Rwandan President Juvénal Habyarimana on April 6, 1994. What followed was what is commonly known as the Rwandan genocide, which resulted in the deaths of at least 800,000 Rwandans, the majority of whom were Tutsi, but also included several moderate Hutu. The end of the Genocide is marked by the RPF taking control of the country on July 1, 1994. Article 16 of the Arusha Accords had provided for the establishment of the International Commission of Investigation on Human Rights Violations in Rwanda since October 1, 1990, which made some progress toward reconciliation, but was sidelined by the 1994 Genocide. The National Unity and Reconciliation Commission was established in March 1999 as per the Government of National Unity Law No. 03/99, in order to promote reconciliation between the two opposing sides.

== Mandate ==
The National Unity and Reconciliation Commission's mission statement is as follows: "To promote unity, reconciliation, and social cohesion among Rwandans and build a country in which everyone has equal rights and contributing to good governance." As of August 2008, the Commission's responsibilities were defined as follows:

1. To prepare and coordinate the national programs aimed at promoting national unity and reconciliation;
2. [To] Establish and promote mechanisms for restoring and strengthening the Unity and Reconciliation of Rwandans;
3. To educate, sensitize and mobilize the population in areas of national unity and reconciliation;
4. To carry out research, organize debates, disseminate ideas and make publications on the promotion of peace, and the unity and reconciliation of Rwandans;
5. To propose measures and actions that can contribute to the eradication of divisionism [sic] among Rwandans and reinforce unity and reconciliation;
6. To denounce and fight actions, publications, and utterances that promote any kind of division and discrimination, intolerance and xenophobia;
7. To make an annual report and other reports that may be deemed necessary, on the level of attainment of national unity and reconciliation;
8. [To] Monitor how public institutions, leaders and the population in general comply with the National Unity and reconciliation policy and principle.

Unlike its predecessor, the International Commission of Investigation on Human Rights Violations in Rwanda since October 1, 1990, the focus of this Commission is on reconciling Rwandan society into a unified, peaceful nation. While it does acknowledge the events of the past, its primary focus is not investigation.

== Structure and funding ==
The Commission consists of a Council of Commissioners composed of twelve Rwandan commissioners (including a President and Vice-President), and a Permanent Secretariat composed of twenty-six members. The roles fulfilled by these members are as follows: an Executive Secretary, an Advisor to the Executive Secretary, an Administrative Assistant to the Executive Secretary, a Division Manager, an Administrative Assistant to Division Manager, Unity & Regional Identity Coordinators for the Northern, Southern, Eastern, and Western provinces, as well as one for Kigali City (five Coordinators in total), an Internal Auditor, a Procurement Officer, a Communication and Community Outreach Specialist, a Legal Affairs Officer, a Partnership and Capacity Building Specialist, a Unity and Reconciliation Research & Monitoring Specialist, a Human Resources Management & Capacity Development Specialist, a Planning, Monitoring and Evaluation Officer, a Director of Finance and Administration, two Unity and Reconciliation Research & Monitoring Specialists, an International Criminal Tribunal Officer, an Accountant, a Peace Building Specialist, a Budget Officer, and a Secretary in Central Secretariat.

The Commission is subdivided into three departments: the Department of Civic Education, the Department of Peace Building and Conflict Management, and the Department of Administration and Finance. It is primarily funded by foreign governments, though funding for some activities also comes from the United Nations, as well as from local and international NGOs.

== Reports and recommendations ==
Since the Commission became a permanent body in 2002, it has not issued a formal, final report as other truth commissions often do; instead, the NURC has issued several annual reports, many of which are based on the proceedings of conferences held since the early 2000s. One such report was the "Report on the Evaluation of National Unity and Reconciliation" which was published in November 2001. Official publications by the NURC are available through the Commission's website.

=== Report on the Evaluation of National Unity and Reconciliation, 2001 ===
This report provides information on the "Nationwide Consultations on Unity and Reconciliation" held from April to June 2001, in every Rwandan province except Gisenyi, as well as provincial consultations held on November 23, 2001. These consultations were intended as a "litmus test" to evaluate the progress of unity and reconciliation in Rwanda, and to receive recommendations from the population on how efforts at reconciliation could be improved.

The report lists indicators of harmonious coexistence, indicators of division, and recommendations from the population. In consideration for the information provided by the aforementioned consultations, the NURC recommends that the population be given more transparent explanations of and access to development programmes (a responsibility of the organizing institutions, associations, and organizations, as well as a responsibility of the media to disseminate the information), and that the Ministry of Education speed up the integration of civic education into primary and secondary school curricula. The NURC also recommends (among others): haste in the establishment of Gacaca court jurisdictions, development programmes, a Compensation Fund, and legislature condemning corruption as well as legislature related to land ownership. Great

== Activities ==
The Commission has a particular focus on homegrown initiatives based in Rwandan history and culture to promote unity and reconciliation. The following are a few such initiatives.

=== Ingando ===
Ingando are solidarity camps held across Rwanda as a means of reconciliation through civic education and cooperation. Women, local leaders, and youth ranging from childhood to prospective university students are specifically targeted for solidarity camps. Solidarity camps have also been associated with the concept of Itorero ry'Igihugu. Igando camps have also been used for the reintegration of former offenders associated with the Genocide, including former members of the armed forces and provisionally-released prisoners. Camps typically last from one to three months, but duration varies depending on the reason for a participant’s attendance. The practice is said to be rooted in Rwandan history, as a tradition of taking a break from society to reflect on serious issues of common concern to the community.

=== Itorero ry’Igihugu ===
Another practice rooted in traditional Rwandan education, these events are intended to promote cultural values associated with reconciliation and efforts to move forward as a nation united by common goals, such as the prevention of HIV/AIDS, the encouragement of gender equality, the awareness of environmental change and impact, and the combat of genocidal ideologies. Itorero ry'Igihugu typically targets youth.

=== Gacaca ===
Gacaca is a traditional Rwandan form of communal justice, whereby local judges are elected by the community to preside over court proceedings. The tradition was revived in 2003 under the presidency of Paul Kagame, in order to try some of the 120,000 people who had been arrested since 1994 in relation to the Genocide. The goals of the Gacaca courts are “to enable truth-telling,” “to promote reconciliation,” “to eradicate the culture of impunity,” “to speed up the trial of genocide suspects,” and “to demonstrate Rwanda’s own problem-solving capacity.” These courts "encourage offenders to confess, to express public apology, and to offer reparations, thereby facilitating the reintegration of perpetrators back into Rwandan society."

=== Abunzi ===
Abunzi employs mediators in local justice, as a first step in conflict resolution. Wherever possible, the mediation of the Abunzi is meant to resolve conflicts before there is a need for the involvement of judicial courts. This Rwandan tradition was revived by the country’s government in 2006.

=== Umuganda ===
The tradition of Umuganda was revived by the Rwandan government in 1998, but was only institutionalized with laws passed in 2007 and 2009. The aim of this initiative is to use the resources of the community to foster growth in the community, through activities such as tree planting, building houses, schools, clinics, and so on. In so doing, the activities associated with Umuganda encourage reconciliation by bringing together former opponents to work on constructive tasks which, in turn, promote national reconstruction. It is a recurring activity, taking place on the last Saturday of every month (though communities can decide to do it more often, if they wish). It lasts for three hours, and is mandatory for all able persons aged 18 to 65.

=== Girinka ===
Also known as the “One Cow Per Poor Family” Program, Girinka "aims at ending malnutrition, poverty, and strengthening social cohesion.” It was set up in 2006 under the government of President Kagame. Poor families are provided with one heifer each, which in turn provides them with milk for sustenance, manure for fertilizer, and a varied source of income. As of 2015, 203,000 families had benefited from the program, while the goal was to reach 350,000 families by 2017.

== Challenges and criticism ==
In a 2016 publication entitled Unity and Reconciliation Process in Rwanda—22 years after the 1994 Genocide perpetrated against Tutsi, the NURC acknowledges four major hindrances to its attempts at unity and reconciliation. The first is identified as "genocide ideology, divisionism [sic], and denial," which the Commissioners note, prevails especially with the elderly and youth. They acknowledge that the legacy of hatred is not easily erased, and the persisting ideologies still cause conflict in Rwanda today. The proposed solution is one of re-education, as with the Ingando and the Itorero ry'Igihugu, for example, and the denouncement of hate speech and other forms of discrimination, as with the anti-discrimination law passed in 2001.

Along the same lines, the second hindrance identified by the NURC is one of "fresh wounds" and "memories of divisions and genocide" felt through generations of perpetrators and survivors, which the NURC is attempting to deal with through its various activities.

The third hindrance is a "problem with the compensation of properties looted [or] destroyed." Generally, the approach to this issue has been to oblige perpetrators to repay their victims for damages incurred, which has proven to be problematic due to outright refusals, or a lack of resources to do so. The Commission also acknowledges the responsibility of the current government to do so on the behalf of the government in power during the Genocide, both in terms of the national debt incurred for genocidal purposes, and the destruction of individuals' property. Some solutions to these issues proposed in the publication include the posting of a report listing the names of people owing debts for destroyed property (with an indication of whether the debt is outstanding based on refusal or incapacity to repay the debt,) as well as the possibility of repaying debts by means other than financially (e.g. building houses). A third suggestion is to solicit funds to repay debts from the international community, in acknowledging the role of the international community in the conflict.

The fourth and final hindrance acknowledged in the publication is "poverty and socioeconomic inequality," which the Commission equally acknowledges was also a "contributing trigger/factor" to the Genocide itself. A dependence on foreign aid and goods, a lack of available land for generally young and still-growing population, and a lack of employment for a generally low-skilled labor force are all contributing factors to the economic struggle which stands in the way of reconciliation. Proposed suggestions to regulate these issues include a shift from the agrarian-based economy to a knowledge-based economy, increased agricultural productivity, the creation of at least 200,000 new jobs annually, reforming education, encouraging vocational training, promoting technological skills, stimulating entrepreneurship with access to financing, and expanding the country's markets both within the continent and across the globe.

Other scholarly criticism has also arisen regarding the approaches to reconciliation by the NURC. Denise Bentrovato, in her article "Accounting for Genocide: Transitional Justice, Mass (Re)Education and the Pedagogy of Truth in Present-day Rwanda," argues that efforts at re-education in Rwanda have been ineffective in transforming the divisive tendencies of Rwandans, especially in their selectivity of what truth will be told. Janine Natalya Clark argues in her article "National Unity and Reconciliation in Rwanda: A Flawed Approach?" that the attempts of the NURC to glaze over Hutu and Tutsi identities and favor a uniform "Banyarwanda" identity undermines the effectiveness of the Commission to achieve true reconciliation and unity. Susan M. Thomson argues that attempts at reconciliation have been too narrow, in that they have further marginalized the ethnic Twa living in Rwanda, by presenting a narrative of genocide and reconciliation which is ignorant to this segment of the Rwandan population. Some other barriers to reconciliation encountered in Rwanda are the refusal of many perpetrators to admit to the crimes they committed during the conflict, and the inability of surviving family members to reconcile without the recovery of their loved ones' bodies.
