= Commission of Inquiry in Algeria =

Truth commission created in 2003

The Ad Hoc Inquiry Commission in Charge of the Question of Disappearances was a truth commission created in 2003 to investigate the forced disappearance of people during civil conflict. Its creation took place after the election of president Abdelaziz Bouteflika, who then set up a National Human Rights Institution. Thereafter, the Commission was set up in order to give people the truth about what happened in the 1990s. However, its report was not made public and consequently, Algerians are not aware of the fate of their relatives.

== Background ==
Since Algeria's independence in 1962, the army has played an important role in the political life of Algeria:

"It was often sardonically remarked by Algerians that while every state has an army, in Algeria the army had a state."

Military forces had fought against French rule for independence before an authoritarian regime was put in place in 1962. It was led by the Front de Libération Nationale who worked with the army. Until President Houari Boumédiène's death in 1978, the military forces had been under control. Then, they came to power and chose "their" man as President, leaving to the FLN the sole task of running the administration". In 1979, Chadli Bendjedid was elected president. In 1991, seeing that the Islamic Salvation Front (FIS), an Islamic party, was about to win the next election, the army officially took power, leaving no place to political parties and cancelled the future election. President Chadli Bendjedid dissolved the People's National Assembly and resigned.

This marked the beginning of the civil war. A temporary government, the High Council of State, was put in place, initially led by Mohamed Boudiaf. But he was assassinated within six months and was succeeded by Ali Kafi. Kafi was in power until the dissolution of the High Council of State and was succeeded by Liamine Zéroual. During this period, extremist militias such as Groupe Islamique Armé rose because they disagreed with the decisions taken about the election. They started to show violence against police, military and civilians, including terrorist attacks. Therefore, a state of emergency was declared. Islamic people began to disappear, to be killed and to be forced to move. Islamic people were chosen randomly. In other words, they could or could not be linked with any militias or act of violence.

In 1999, Abdelaziz Bouteflika, who was close to Boumédiène, was elected president and ended the war. Islamic groups agreed to lay down their weapons for Algeria to become at peace again. At the end of the conflict, more than 150,000 deaths and 7,000 disappearances were registered.

== Purpose of the inquiry commission ==
In 2003, President Abdelaziz Bouteflika put in place a commission to investigate past crimes. It was called “Ad Hoc Inquiry Commission in Charge of the Question of Disappearances". It was made up of six commissioners, five men and one woman, all Algerian. They were all chosen by the President. The aim of the commission was truth-seeking, especially to know what happened to the disappeared people. It was also meant to plan and give reparations to the families of the victims. However, it is said that the commission functioned more like "a ‘management center' and an interface between families of the disappeared and the Algerian public administration" than a commission of investigation.

== Results of the commission ==
=== Charter for Peace and National Reconciliation ===
In 2005, the President called a referendum to approve the Charter for Peace and National Reconciliation (CPNR). It came out of a previous law enacted in 1999 which "promoted peace and national reconciliation". With this law, Islamist groups agreed to stop violence, expecting a peaceful state. The charter was approved in the referendum, with 96% in favour. In effect, Algerians accepted amnesty. However, the opposition maintained that the approval was "the result of the government's programme of propaganda".

Therefore, this charter aimed at peacemaking and granting amnesty to murderers and criminals. They all could get through it unscathed, whether they were considered terrorists or not. There were exceptions for crimes like "massacres, rapes, and bombings in public places." The word "terrorism" does not appear in this charter. The past events were qualified as a "national tragedy", a way for the government not to denounce and condemn their criminals but also to promote peace. The Algerian government has considered reconciliation through forgiveness.

The charter also stipulates that anyone who continues to speak about this period will be imprisoned for a period from 3 to 5 years and have a fine to pay.

"In 2017, a law was adopted which forbids to mention the "national tragedy" whether for analysis or reflective reason." said Karima Dirèche, a Franco-Algerian historian.

Even journalists, foreign or not, can have trouble if they try to investigate and know what happened and what is being done to improve the situation. All of these measures emphasize a collective amnesia—people are forced not to talk about it.

However, the charter also returned to past arrests. Indeed, people who had been accused of terrorism and punished could be given their civil rights back or their relatives could be compensated.

=== Reparations ===
The charter specifies that reparations should be made to the victims. Therefore, since 2006, the government has paid reparations of about USD 37 million. More than 2,000 families were paid, but only if they could provide a death certificate. However, several families refused to acknowledge that their relatives were dead since no proof was given.

The focus on reparations was similar to the Equity and Reconciliation Commission in Morocco, where disappearances began under the rule of King Mohammed V after he assumed the throne in 1957. His son, King Hassan II, continued these policies. In the 1990s, under local and international pressure, he established an Advisory Council on Human Rights (CCDH) to investigate human rights violations and provide advice. In 2003, the CCDH asked for the creation of a truth commission to investigate violations in depth. The purpose of the commission was to provide recommendations, medical care, and money compensations to the victims. However, the commission did not give any names and was limited in its investigations. It concluded that 742 disappeared people were dead. Several cases remain unsolved with no answers. Morocco began to offer reparations to victims.

== Report ==
The commission reported in 2005, but only the President had access to the report. Nevertheless, Chairman Farouk Ksentini declared that the state was held responsible for about 6,146 disappearances and deaths.

== Criticisms ==
Cherida Khaddar reported that she had seen her brother and sister die in front of her eyes. She is the head of the non-governmental organization, Djazairouna. She commemorates the victims of the civil war with other families on March 8 and tries and denounce the government but often ends at the police station and is mistreated. Djazairouna is an association made to help victims of terrorism in Algeria. The victims can receive any type of help: clothes, food or money, from insofar as possible. Members of associations also try to visit the victims who have been hospitalized. They bring a psychological support and accompany them in all the steps they undertake, judicial or not.

"Bouteflika in promising peace to the Algerians had 'ended the dreams of truth and justice for thousands of families of the disappeared'"

This is what Nacéra Dutour argued about the charter, illustrating the victims' state of mind. The victims and their family disagreed with the outcome of the Inquiry Commission and rejected the charter. Dutour founded SOS Disparus, an association for the disappeared, chaired by her mother Fatima Yous. Before creating this organization, Dutour had worked with international groups in France. Her involvement in this crisis is due to the fact that her son had been arrested while fasting during Ramadan whereas he was not involved in politics and tried to become a taxi driver. Every Wednesday, her association demonstrates in front of the Parliament to claim their rights. They called for an efficient commission which would denounce what had happened and condemn the perpetrators. They wanted justice. As Cherifa Khaddar points out:

“We want the courts to deal with those who ordered and those who carried out acts of violence, even if Mr. Bouteflika later pardons them,”

Nacéra Dutour adds:

"[a referendum could not] 'be the means by which a government evades its international obligations.'".

At the end, apart from monetary compensation, Algerian people have not obtained redress. As a consequence, a lot of families are stuck between two states of mind: remaining silent about what happened or denouncing it and taking the risk of being arrested and imprisoned.

Many Algerians continue to seek the truth about the disappeared even if no retributive justice takes place. On the other hand, prosecuting is a hard task since there is not enough evidence to prove someone's responsibility. Farouk Ksentini, the President of the National Consultative Commission for the Promotion and Protection of Human Rights, stated that most information about disappearances come from the families, with very few witnesses. Moreover, with the report of the commission not being public, the issue is the "Algerian authorities" obstruction of any investigation, even non-judicial, into past atrocities."

== Women's role in Algerian society ==
Women play a significant role in Algeria. Their place in Algerian society goes back to Algerian War for independence where they could be solicited to place bombs in the Europeans areas. Akila Ouared, who was an agent in Front de Libération National (FLN) during Algerian War reported:

“We women were always there at the helm.”

Nowadays, as only men disappeared and were killed during the civil war, women have to take their position in society. This is the reason why women's groups have arisen, such as Djazairouna and SOS Disparus.

== International involvement ==
During the Algerian Civil War, no countries intervened because it was thought that the army was doing the right thing in order to prevent the rise of Islamic groups. Countries such as France or the United States was afraid of the impact of groups as Islamic Salvation Front on Western affairs: "the FIS would pose serious threats to the West's economic and security interests in the region".

Nevertheless, in 2007, a conference called "Truth, Peace, and Conciliation" was held. The Algerians invited international experts to the conference, but they were refused visas or otherwise barred from entry.
