= Svetlana Velmar-Janković =

Serbian novelist and essayist

- Born: February 1, 1933; Belgrade
- Died: April 9, 2014 (aged 81); Belgrade
- Writing career
- Notable awards: Isidora Sekulić Award; NIN Award; Andrić Prize

Svetlana Velmar-Janković (Serbian Cyrillic: Светлана Велмар-Јанковић, Serbian pronunciation: [sʋɛ̌tlana ʋɛ̂lmaːr jaːnkɔʋitɕ], 1 February 1933 – 9 April 2014) was a Serbian novelist, essayist, chronicler of Belgrade, and first female laureate of the Isidora Sekulić Award. She was considered to be one of the most important Serbian female authors of her time. In 2001, the French President Jacques Chirac honored her with the Chevalier medal of Legion of Honor because she always took care to preserve the humanist values which unite her and her country with the rest of Europe.

== Life and work ==
Svetlana Velmar-Janković was born in Belgrade, in the city which should remain the center of life for her whole life until death. She grew up in city quarter Dorćol and was one of two daughters of Vladimir Velmar-Janković, appointed deputy minister of education of the Government of National Salvation in the German Territory of the Military Commander in Serbia, who escaped from Yugoslavia in September 1944. He left his wife and children behind. They had to accept serious social consequences because of that in communist Yugoslavia, and that was not easy to endure for the remained family members. At the beginning of the 3rd millennium, late efforts of his daughters to get him officially rehabilitated, ran into opposition. A brief statement by his famous daughter gives an idea of the long-term suffering of the family, and a question asked at the beginning of this millennium by a contemporary witness and representative of the post-war state, who was nobody else than Tito's official German language interpreter during state visits and receptions, brings up this issue to the point.

That's why we've been branded all our lives. Svetlana Velmar-Janković, 2005

To explain my today’s position, I have to say that when I returned from the German concentration camp, I lived as a winner in the time of Svetlana's greatest suffering as a girl from a family of the vanquished. On the day after the liberation, everything was not only taken away from her and her family, but she and her sick mother were thrown on the street in the middle of winter. Should the guilt of an enemy of the people be passed on to family members, underage children? Ivan Ivanji, 2017

After completion of her secondary school education, she graduated with maturity diploma at IV gymnasium for girls in 1951, she began studying French language and literature at the Philological Faculty of Belgrade's University, and completed with diploma in 1963. In 1953, still while her education at university, she became journalist and wrote contributions to the youth magazines Dečje štampe and Pioniri. From 1959 to 1975, she was editor of the literary journal Književnost of Prosveta publishing house, and in 1971 she became member of the editorial board of this company, where she worked until 1989. In the meantime, she edited Prosveta's publication series Baština (Heritage) which consists of prose and essays of numerous Serbian authors.

She was elected corresponding member of the Serbian Academy of Sciences and Arts since 2006, and became a full member three years later. From 2007 to 2013, she was chairwoman of the board of directors of the National Library of Serbia.

Svetlana Velmar-Janković was married twice, her first marriage to journalist Miodrag Protić ended with his death in 1974, after twenty one years of wedlock, and her son Đorđe (born in 1966) comes from this relationship, he emigrated to the United States of America. She is interred in an honorary grave of the Belgrade New Cemetery. Her second husband was Žarko Rošulj (born in 1940), who worked at Nolit publishing as a graphic editor from 1978 to 1996 and died in 2018.

In its obituary, the newspaper Politika cites the deceased lady once again who will never be passed away in collective memory and lives on in her books about places, people and generations.

I write about the past so I can see it, and I see it as I write. Remembering, which is a rediscovery, always leads us to a deeper understanding of the world. I grew up in Belgrade, and without that ground, I don't know how I would exist and live. I deal with the past of this city so that I can understand and endure its present.

Her complete work is already including one or several editions in Bulgarian, German, English, French, Hungarian, Italian, Korean, Macedonian and Spanish translation, most of all published in French. Internationally best known book from her complete work is the novel Lagum, which has also been published in Bulgarian, English (two editions in 1996 and 2002), French, German, Italian and Spanish translation. Lagum, a term of Turkish origin, refers to a dark dungeon-like underground passage, in which no light falls, as are numerous under the Kalemegdan fortress, and scene of the plot is the city of Belgrade, written from the perspective of the wife of a professor of Belgrade University. Protagonist Milica Pavlović, first-person narrator, tells life events from her time period between 1928 and 1984. When her husband, the well-respected Dušan Pavlović, tried to save as many people as possible from the Ustashe extermination camps in the Independent State of Croatia during the war and therefore co-operated with Serbian Quisling government, the couple became increasingly estranged. Above that, Milica hides a wounded partisan in the servant room of her apartment without her husband's knowledge and children. The takeover of power by the communist resistance fighters become the fate of the family: Dušan is executed as a collaborator, the apartment is ransacked by neighbors who hastily turned into zealous and cruel henchmen of the new regime. Milica is reviled as a traitor by people whom she and her husband had saved years ago. So also from that partisan who recovered hidden in family's flat. It is a sensitive but relentless portrait of society, a profound analysis of human contradictions, character weaknesses and political opportunism.

Celia Hawkesworth, English translator of the novel Lagum, describes this work as follows:

Lagum is a product of the new political climate following the collapse of communism in Eastern Europe. It is an understated subtle account of the distortions in human relationships engendered by social upheavals. It bridges the wide gap between post-war communist rule and pre-war society in Yugoslavia by opening up previously taboo questions about the nature of the war in Yugoslavia and the meaning of collaboration during the occupation. Tracing the life of a middle-class woman whose husband was executed by the communist authorities, and who is obliged after 1945 to live with her two children in a small part of their large flat in Belgrade, it reveals the complex misunderstandings and false perceptions resulting from social divisions, resentments, and revolution.

For the past three decades of her life, Svetlana Velmar-Janković advocated for democracy and human rights, based on humanism and European values of the Western world. Two examples are briefly presented here: an excerpt from her speech during the 1991 protests including the beginning of the Yugoslav wars and her statement about the Serbian declaration on Srebrenica massacre. She was also a member of the Truth and Reconciliation Commission (Komisija za istinu i pomirenje).

These protests should have started much earlier, when the first shots were heard and when attacks on people and towns began. I am afraid that it already too late. Still, let us not allow them reduce us to their subjects who have become malicious, let us strengthen the better side of our personality, let us continue to walk and to support each other!

I can only say that once again the opportunity to clearly condemn what has been done to Non-Serbs, thousands of human beings in Srebrenica, has been missed to have the moral right to speak tomorrow about what to the Serbian population happened in the 1990s. If we refuse to face the horror of the violent deaths committed ten years ago, how will we fight for the truth in the world?

== Bibliography ==
Novels

- Ožiljak (Scar), 1956
- Lagum (Dungeon), 1990
- Bezdno (Bottomless), 1995
- Nigdina (Nowhere), 2000
- Vostanije (Uprising), 2004

Essays

- Savremenici (Contemporaries), 1967
- Ukletnici (Cursed Ones), 1993
- Izabranici (Chosen Ones), 2005
- Srodnici (Kinfolk), 2013

Memoirs

- Prozraci (Ventilation), 2003 and 2015 (second volume, posthumous)

Short Stories, Narrations

- Dorćol, 1981
- Vračar, 1994
- Glasovi (Voices), 1997
- Knjiga za Marka (Book for Marko), children's literature, 1998
- Očarane naočare: priče o Beogradu (Spellbound Spectacles: Stories About Belgrade), 2006
- Sedam mojih drugara (Seven of my Friends), 2007
- Zapisi sa dunavskog peska (Danube Sand Records), 2016 (posthumous)

Monograph

- Kapija Balkana: brzi vodič kroz prošlost Beograda (Gate of the Balkans: Quick Guide Through Belgrade's History), 2011

Theatre Plays

- Žezlo (Sceptre, contains Stefan Dečanski and Knez Mihailo), 2011
- Knez Mihailo, Premiere at Yugoslav Drama Theatre, 1996
- Lagum, dramatized by Gordana Gocić, Premiere at Atelje 212, 1995

English editions

- Dungeon (Lagum), translated by Celia Hawkesworth, Dereta and UCL, Belgrade and London 1996, ISBN 0-903425-55-6.

== Honors ==
- Isidora Sekulić Award 1967 for Savreminici
- Andrić Prize 1981 for Dorćol
- Meša Selimović Award 1990 for Lagum
- Award for the most read book of the National Library of Serbia 1991: Lagum
- Borisav Stanković Award 1994 for Vračar
- Đorđe Jovanović Award 1994 for Vračar
- NIN Award 1995 for Bezdno
- Neven Award 1998 for Knjiga za Marka
- Politikin Zabavnik Award 1998 for Knjiga za Marka
- Mišićev dukat 2001 for life achievement
- Legion of Honor (Chevalier medal) 2001
- Ramonda Serbika Award 2002 of Književna kolonija „Sićevo“
- Stefan Mitrov Ljubiša Award 2002 for literary life achievement
- Award of Udruženje Beogradjana “6. april 1941” for her complete literary work about Belgrade, 2007
- Gordana Todorović Award for life work of women writers 2008
