= Truth-seeking =

Restorative justice process

Truth-seeking processes allow societies to examine and come to grips with past crimes and atrocities and prevent their future repetition. Truth-seeking often occurs in societies emerging from a period of prolonged conflict or authoritarian rule. The most famous example to date is the South African Truth and Reconciliation Commission, although many other examples also exist. Most commonly these are carried out by official truth and reconciliation commissions as a form of restorative justice, but there are other mechanisms as well.

Through a truth-seeking process, actors in a country are able to investigate past abuses and seek redress for victims and their families. Such investigations go beyond simply identifying guilty parties or individuals, but may investigate root causes, patterns of suffering, and social impact as well as events in individual cases, such as disappearances.

By seeking to investigate such questions with a high degree of professionalism and commitment, truth-seeking processes seek to create long-lasting public impact, often through the publication of a public report. Such reporting helps expose the facts of violations and suffering, which are often otherwise denied, and minimize possibilities of revisionism in the future.

Given that truth-seeking requires both considerable time and resources to properly tackle investigations and victims’ needs, local community and regional representatives, civil society organizations, NGOs and aid agencies, and governmental and judicial entities play different roles in this process.

== The right to truth ==
Many steps taken in a truth-seeking process are based on the premise of a right to truth. The right to truth entails that victims and communities affected by past crimes have the right to know the identity of suspected perpetrators consistent with the rights of the suspects. According to the International Center for Transitional Justice: "Any person who has suffered atrocities has the unalienable right to know who is responsible; any family whose members have disappeared has the basic right discover their fate and whereabouts; every society where these crimes have taken place have the right to learn their history without lies or denial."

The right to truth is an emerging principle in customary international law. It has been recognized in the United Nations Principles on Impunity and subsequent UN materials, and the UN has declared March 24 to be the "International Day for the Right to the Truth Concerning Gross Human Rights Violations and for the Dignity of Victims" in memory of Archbishop Oscar Romero. The right to truth has also been proclaimed by regional bodies such as the Inter-American Court of Human Rights, and in some national courts.

== Truth-seeking mechanisms ==
Frequently used tactics during truth-seeking include the protection of evidence, collection of extensive victim data and testimony, the opening and maintenance of state information and public archives, and the publication of comprehensive reports. To implement such practices, truth commissions are often established to represent voices of victims. Such commissions are typically independent in nature and focus on accountability for past crimes, the root causes for the conflict and constructing historical narratives countering revisionism of the past. Policy recommendations issued by commissions often lead to a call for national reforms and further transitional justice initiatives, such as reparations, vetting and prosecutions.

Official truth commissions (often called truth and reconciliation commissions) have taken place in many countries, including South Africa, Peru, Timor-Leste, Liberia, the Solomon Islands, and South Korea. Most recently truth commissions have begun to be implemented in developed countries such as Canada and Germany.

== Unofficial or local truth-seeking ==
Unofficial or local truth-seeking projects became popular in the 1980s and 1990s in Latin America, when community organizations such as churches and academic institutions documented human rights violations and issued reports following the end to military rule. Though unofficial, such efforts from civil society often serve to pave the way for or complement state- led transitional justice initiatives, and sometimes produce superior results, as in Guatemala. Unofficial truth-seeking initiatives have also taken place more recently at the local level in Northern Ireland, the United States, South Korea, and elsewhere. Calls for truth-seeking processes continue to be debated in other countries, such as Cambodia and Colombia.

== See also ==
- Memorialization
- Truth Commission
- Conflict resolution
- Transitional justice
- Transitional Justice Institute
- List of truth and reconciliation commissions
