= Vladimir Velmar-Janković =

Serbian writer (1895–1976)

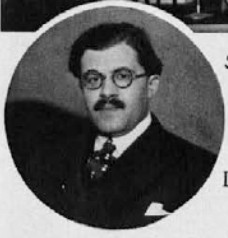
- Born: August 10, 1895
- Died: August 12, 1976 (aged 81)
- Occupation: Writer

Vladimir Velmar-Janković (Serbian Cyrillic: Владимир Велмар-Јанковић; August 10, 1895 – August 12, 1976) was a Serbian writer and member of Serbia's World War II quisling government.

== Biography ==
Velmar-Janković was born in the village of Čaglić near Lipik, at the time in the Kingdom of Croatia-Slavonia, Austria-Hungary. He finished elementary school in Varaždin, attended the Serb Tekelijanum in Buda and finished university in Zagreb.

During the Second World War, Velmar-Janković served as assistant to the Serbian minister of culture and religion Velibor Jonić. The ministry was responsible for racist teachings in Serbian schools during the war years.

He left the country on September 17, 1944, when the Serbian administration was defeated, and subsequently moved to Rome, Italy for the following two years. He was considered by the Communist Yugoslav Government to be an enemy of the state. After two years in Rome he moved to Barcelona, Spain. There he wrote under the pen name of V.J.Wukmir. He lived in Barcelona until his death from a car accident in 1976.

Since the dissolution of communist Yugoslavia, Velmar-Janković's works have become more widely available in Serbia. His daughter is Serbian writer Svetlana Velmar-Janković. She has lobbied to name a street in Belgrade after her father, in honour of his written work about the city Pogled s Kalemegdana. This has been opposed by some writers due to Velmar-Janković's role as a collaborator with the occupying Axis forces during the Second World War. She has attempted to have her father officially rehabilitated by the Serbian government.

== Works ==
- Svetla u noći, Zagreb, 1919
- Ivan Mandušin, Belgrade, 1922
- Novi, Belgrade, 1922
- Robovi, Belgrade, 1924
- Dečak s Une, Belgrade, 1926
- U vrtlogu, Belgrade, 1926
- Duhovna kriza današnjice, Belgrade, 1928
- Bez ljubavi, Belgrade, 1932
- Sreća A. D., Belgrade, 1932
- Državni neprijatelj broj 3, Belgrade, 1936
- Građanska komedija, Belgrade, 1938
- Pogled s Kalemegdana, Belgrade, 1938
- Dnevna vest, Belgrade, 1941
- Psicologia de la orientacion vital (Psihologija životnog opredeljenja), Barcelona 1960; (in Spanish)
- El hombre ante si mismo (Čovek pred samim sobom), Barsclona 1964
- Emocion y sufrimento (Emocije i patnje), Barcelona 1967

== Sources ==
- Vladimir Velmar-Janković
- In memory of the founder of the Centre for Psychology, Danas
