= Truth and Reconciliation Commission (DRC) =

The Truth and Reconciliation Commission (French: La Commission de Verité et de la Réconciliation) was a truth commission which ran from July 2003 - February 2007 to investigate and promote national unity as a response to the atrocities committed in the war in the Democratic Republic of Congo between the Congolese army, Congolese rebels, and foreign insurgents.

A peace conference called the Inter-Congolese Dialogue was held Pretoria, South Africa on December the 16, 2002, with hundreds of members from Congolese civil society participating in the dialogue. The peace conference brought together the Government of the Democratic Republic of the Congo and the political opposition, the Congolese Rally for Democracy (RCD); the Mai-Mai militia; the Movement for the Liberation of the Congo (MLC); members of civil society; the Congolese Rally for Democracy/Liberation Movement (RDC/ML); and the Congolese Rally for Democracy/National (RCD/N) to find a solution which would promote national unity after the wars and conflicts in the country. The result of the Inter-Congolese dialogue was the Sun City accord which was an agreement that the transitional government would establish a Truth and Reconciliation Commission as part of its mandate to promote national healing and unity.

== Conflicts ==
The First Congo War referred to by some as the Great Wars of Africa or the African World Wars, began in 1996 with an invasion of the Congo-Zaire by its bordering states and Congolese rebel groups. The eastern part of Congo suffered destabilization as a result of the Rwandan genocide, as many rebels, refugees and war criminals fled across the border from Rwanda in order to escape consequences of the conflicts during the genocide. As Mobutu Sese Seko's regime lost control of the eastern part of the country, a Congolese leader named Laurent-Désiré Kabila sought help from neighboring states in order to overthrow Mobutu's dictatorship. After successfully removing Mobutu from power with the help of Hutu and Tutsi forces in 1997, Kabila proclaimed himself president and renamed the country the Democratic Republic of the Congo. Disagreements between Kabila and his former allies Rwanda and Uganda over compensation and the future relationships of the neighboring states led to a growing sense of vulnerability as the Rwandan and Ugandan armies used to defeat Mobutu's army now stood uncontested in the capital Kinshasa.

The Second Congo War began in 1998 as alliances shifted. Kabila and his former allies grew apart due to Rwanda and Uganda shifting their support to a new rebellion under the banner of the Rally for Congolese Democracy. Kabila forged new alliances with Angola, Zimbabwe, and Namibia and in 1999 negotiations resulted in most countries involved withdrawing their forces from the state. Foreign interest in the resource rich nation had always been at the source of the conflicts, going back to the assassination of Patrice Lumumba, Laurent Kabila's assassination was supported by foreign powers and orchestrated by Lebanese nationals. While the assassination succeeded, the coup d'état ultimately failed, as DRC's regime managed to maintain control over the state and promptly put Kabila's son Joseph in power.

Joseph Kabila serves as the president in the transitional government, but the Great African Wars have grown very complex, and the east remains destabilized with conflicts flaring up periodically. Various parties, armies, rebel groups, and international actors remain involved and invested in the Congo today.

== Mandate and composition ==
The Comprehensive Peace Agreement created institutions to help the country transition to peace including the Truth and Reconciliation commission, aimed to help those affected by the conflicts in the eastern provinces. The mandate of the commission was to promote national unity by examining the socio-economic and political conflicts since independence in the 1960s. Using Articles 154 – 160 of the Comprehensive Peace Agreement, the truth commission was tasked with the re-establishment of peace in the state by establishing a narrative of truth from the conflicting accounts of history. The commission was led by Bishop Jean-Luc Kuye Ndondo wa Mulemera and had a total of 21 members. The 21 members represented on the panel came from the various groups involved in the conflict. The commission was made up of Congolese civil society such as social scientists, religious leaders, non-governmental organizations, victims, and perpetrators. Of the 21 members, 8 officers and 13 provincial representatives were selected.

== Results ==
Multiple issues caused the commission to suffered a slow start and as a result much of the goals were not met during the 4 year mandate. Issues including the selection process and criteria for membership of commissioners, and the training process for the positions made it difficult for the commission to start any work mandated by the accords. Issues with the selection process further complicated things because commissioners were selected almost a year before the commissions terms of reference had been set. This was controversial due to the lack of confidence the selected commissioners inspired. Many believed that the many candidates lacked the credibility needed to effectively run a truth commission. Efforts began to begin the various training sessions around the country for the various people who would be part of the commission, but the truth commission barely made it past this stage and thus the truth commission accomplished very little work.

Another obstacle for the truth commission was that its mandate to tackle issues which began from the colonial period to today, was perhaps too large of a task for one commission to attempt to resolve. Ongoing disputes between various sections of Congolese society, including political and ethno-cultural disputes, and the pending elections would ultimately prove to be too grand an endeavor. The commission fell victim to a degree of politicization due to the ongoing political climate, tense political rivalry from both internal and international actors made the truth commission less of a priority compared to the battle over who would win the elections and dictate which direction the country would go into. The political climate dictated the direction in which the commission went, this is in part due to issues with the power-sharing climate in which the commission was operating under. Many people who were directly involved in the conflict were selected to be commissioners in order to represent their respective side of the conflicts.

The commission ended and assessed their work in 2006 and unanimously agreed that a second truth commission was needed after the elections of 2006 in hopes that with a more settled political climate, the new commission would be better positioned to more effectively tackle the issues. While the commission operated for 4 years, the final report was only 84 pages long. No concrete or substantive findings were reported and only general recommendations were proposed instead. Ongoing conflicts limited the ability to do any investigations, and thus no victims, perpetrators, or witnesses were included in the reports. Limited information about procedures, tasks, targets, methodology or impact where detailed. The commission's work was relatively restricted to mediating the political struggle between the various factions involved in the conflict.

In 2007 the former chair drafted a proposal for a second commission, but enthusiasm died down as the political climate stabilized in the country. Donors and policy makers also lost confidence in the commissions ability to effectively tackle these issues because of how politicized the first one became. Other more important issues such as the ongoing conflict in the east of Congo, economic developments, and new economic and social initiatives from the newly elected government took precedence over the truth commission and as a result attempts to start a new truth commission continue to this day.

== Assessment ==
The truth commission's success depended on a number of factors which were not in the favor of reconciliation, in the analysis of Priscilla Hayner and Elena Naughton. The Congo's wars and ongoing conflicts involve a complex array of parties with different stakes and goals in the region. The eastern part of Congo is a proxy battle field in which both regional and international actors are fighting for control of the resources rich nation. Due to this investment, international support for a resolution of the conflict has not been very strong, as world powers support and fund various regional actors involved in the conflict. Further, the commission's link to the transitional government, and the political climate which attempted to apply a democratic power sharing structure, prevented any real progress due to the power struggles between the various parties trying to steer the destiny of the country. As many people involved in the conflict were part of the commission, it made little effort to investigate, condemn, or punish perpetrators of war crimes, which resulted in a sort of impunity for those responsible for the atrocities. The ongoing conflicts also made it impossible to do any effective work despite the government's efforts to try to establish a degree of stability and peace. The broad mandate which is clearly the cause of the conflicts, made it difficult to effectively tackle the issues which the commission was tasked to resolve. Because of the transitory government, eventual elections and ongoing conflicts, the truth commission was involuntarily reoriented towards conflict prevention and mediation instead of its mandated truth seeking work.
