= Truth Commission for the Sámi People =

Swedish government inquiry about treatment of the Sámi people

- Sanningskommissionen för det samiska folket

Agency overview
- Superseding agency: Ministry of Culture
- Type: Truth commission
- Jurisdiction: Government of Sweden
- Agency executive: Lena Nyberg, Chairperson
- Website: sanningskommissionensamer.se

The Truth Commission for the Sámi People (Swedish: Sanningskommissionen för det samiska folket) is an inquiry appointed by the Government of Sweden. Established in 2021, its objective is to investigate the effects of historical policies on the Sámi people. An interim report was presented on 4 March 2026 at Umeå University and the final report was handed over at Mid Sweden University on 30 September.

== Background ==
The Sámi are an indigenous people native to Northern Scandinavia and the Kola Peninsula; they live in Sweden, Norway, Finland, and Russia. Because census-taking based on ethnicity is forbidden in Sweden, there is no clearly accepted figure as to the number of Sámi in the country. The Swedish Sámi population has been estimated between 20,000–70,000. Sweden's Parliament, the Riksdag, passed legislation in 1977 recognising them as an Indigenous people and an ethnic minority. Sámi people historically experienced institutional abuse in workhouses and schools, pseudoscientific skull-measuring through State Institute for Racial Biology programmes, and other forms of forced assimilation.

Several other countries have had truth and reconciliation commissions which predate Sweden's initiative, including the Royal Commission on Aboriginal Peoples in Canada which began in 1991 and culminated in a 4,000-page report in 1996. In 2008, the youth organisation Sáminuorra wrote to the Swedish government advocating for a Sámi truth commission. Nearly six years later, the Sámi Parliament formally agreed to pursue the matter, approving a motion by several political parties (Min Geaidnu, Albmut, Landspartiet Svenska Samer, and Vuovdega). At the eighth opening of the Sámi Parliament, Amanda Lind of the Green Party–then the Minister for Culture– gave a speech conveying the high priority of a truth commission, saying: "The Sámi have been treated as though they were not human beings, which pains me" (Samerna har behandlats som att man inte är människor, det smärtar mig).

== Commission ==
In November 2021, the Swedish government formally appointed a truth commission with the following aims:

- "investigate and examine the policies pursued toward the Sámi people and the actions of relevant actors in the implementation of said policies" (kartlägga och granska den politik som förts gentemot samerna och relevanta aktörers agerande vid genomförandet av den politiken)
- "disseminate knowledge about and increase general understanding of Sámi history and how historical injustices affect the current conditions for the Sámi, as well as work to ensure this knowledge is passed on to future generations" (sprida kunskap om och öka den allmänna förståelsen för samernas historia och hur historiska oförrätter påverkar dagens villkor för samerna samt verka för att denna kunskap förs vidare till kommande generationer)
- "submit proposals for measures that contribute to redress and promote reconciliation and a viable Sámi society" (lämna förslag på åtgärder som bidrar till upprättelse och främjar försoning och ett livskraftigt samiskt samhälle)

At the time of the announcement, the committee's members had not been decided, but an expected date of 1 December 2025 was given for its completion. In April 2022, Kerstin Calissendorff, a Justice of the Supreme Court of Sweden, was announced as the chairperson of the newly formed committee. The other committee members were announced in June. Two departures swiftly followed as Sámi textile artist Britta Marakatt-Labba and Sámi linguistics professor Mikael Svonni resigned, both citing personal reasons. The following year, Calissendorff also left. The chairperson role was subsequently filled by Anders Lidén, a diplomat who had represented Sweden before the United Nations.

On 31 October, Lidén resigned as chairperson after just over a year, citing tactical disagreements over the commission's direction. His resignation coincided with a critical opinion piece published in Svenska Dagbladet by columnist Peter Wennblad. Wennblad had called for the commission's dissolution, arguing it was more concerned with furthering activist goals than conducting an objective and fair historical review. Lidén disagreed with Wennblad's commentary, calling it "unpleasant" (obehaglig) and inaccurate. Three other members also left during this autumn as well, bringing the total number of departures to nine. The Minister for Culture, Parisa Liljestrand of the Moderate Party commented on the wave of resignations, saying the members had "difficulties working together" (samarbetssvårigheter). Several members disputed Liljestrand's remarks; others agreed there was serious disagreement on the commission. The following February, the Sámi Parliament's steering group for the commission unanimously rejected the government's suggestion for a new chairperson, with Sámi politician Håkan Jonsson commenting that the person was "very competent" (väldigt kompetent) but not suited to the role. Lena Nyberg, the former director general of the Swedish Agency for Youth and Civil Society, ultimately took over. She began her tenure as the Truth Commission's third chairperson on 8 April 2025.

Approximately 300 oral interviews and 90 written testimonies from Sámi people across the country had been collected by January 2026. Norrländska Socialdemokraten reported that it constituted the largest study of its kind in Sweden. On 4 March, the Truth Commission for the Sami People delivered its first of three interim reports in a research anthology titled "Marken, vattnet, tankarna – konsekvenser för samer av svensk politik" (transl. The Land, the Water, the Mindset – Consequences of Swedish Policy for the Sámi), during a ceremony at Umeå University. The document consists of 36 sections, examining topics such as water rights, language policy, and the effects of racial biology. Both historical and contemporary forms of discrimination were addressed. Liljestrand received the report on behalf of the government; it was also submitted to the Sámi Parliament and Sáminuorra. The final report was submitted on 30 September, with the handover taking place at Mid Sweden University in Östersund.

== Analysis ==
The Swedish commission to address treatment of the Sámi people has received negative press coverage due to instability via numerous resignations. It is also distinguished from those in neighbouring countries of Norway and Finland by its lack of stated focus on reconciliation. Accordingly, the title of the Swedish commission only mentions truth and not reconciliation, unlike the Truth and Reconciliation Commission of Norway and the Sámi Truth and Reconciliation Commission of Finland. Malin Arvidsson, a human rights lecturer at Lund University who was involved in the corresponding commission for Tornedalians, Kvens, and Lantalaiset, said this was intentional, as the organizers felt truth must come before reconciliation.
