= National Commission of Inquiry Into Disappearances =

The National Commission of Inquiry Into Disappearances (Spanish: Comisión Nacional de Investigación de Desaparecidos) was a truth commission in Bolivia that lasted from 1982 to 1984. It was the first truth and reconciliation commission in Latin America. After a period of political instability in the country and a series of military coups and corrupt governments and dictatorships, the newly appointed president Hernán Siles Zuazo hoped to restore the country to democracy when he came to power in October 1982. Siles Zuazo established the National Commission of Inquiry Into Disappearances to look into suspicious disappearances that occurred between 1967 and 1982, and hired 8 commissioners to research and investigate. The commission was forced to disband after less than 2 years of work due to lack of financial and political support from the government, as well as the commission's limited mandate, which only allowed investigations into death or disappearance and not into other crimes against humanity. Although the commission disbanded, 56 officials from past governments were put on trial in the "Trials of Responsibility", including dictator Luis García Meza Tejada. The Trials of Responsibility lasted from 1984 to 1993, during which 48 people were convicted.

== History ==
From 1964 until 1982, the political situation in Bolivia was highly unstable. In 1964, a coup d'état overthrew the government of Victor Paz Estenssoro, resulting in a military dictatorship led by René Barrientos, who became president after occupying the presidential palace. Following Barrientos' death in 1969, another coup took place, with the armed forces under General Alfredo Ovando Candia effectively taking the presidency from Barrientos' vice-president, Luís Adolfo Siles Salinas. The years following Barrientos' death resulted in a period of political turmoil, described as "one military regime after another" and "politics stretching all the way from extreme left through reformist to reactionary right". Following the 1978 coup in the government of Colonel Hugo Banzer Suárez, who had been in power for six years, several elections were held in Bolivia in an attempt to return to democracy. The period between 1978 and 1980 was tumultuous and chaotic, having had two general elections and five presidents, none of whom were victorious in the polls.

In 1980, General Luis García Meza Tejada took power in Bolivia. One of the more renown leaders of this period of Bolivian history, his presidency was "notorious for human rights abuses, drug trafficking and economic mismanagement" and was eventually overthrown by a military coup in 1981. The military government sought to return to democracy after the ruthlessness of the García Meza dictatorship. From 1981 to 1982, Bolivia saw 3 different military governments in 14 months, resulting in the military appointing a president in hopes of returning to a more democratic rule. On October 10, 1982, the Armed Forces ceded power to Hernán Siles Zuazo. He had previously served as president from 1956 to 1960. His government was seen as the first Bolivian government to attempt to return to democratic rule, as well as the beginning of a more politically stable period. One of the first things he did a part of his new government leadership was to establish a commission to investigate the disappearances that occurred between 1967 and 1982.

== Establishment of the commission ==
One of Zuazo's priorities as president was to bring the country back to democratic rule, and hoped to begin doing so in part by investigating into numerous crimes against humanity that occurred in years prior. The National Commission of Inquiry Into Disappearances was established on October 28, 1982. A total of 8 commissioners were appointed to do work for the commission, and were selected with the intent of being representative of Bolivian society at the time. The commissioners were the undersecretary of justice, a member of the House, a Senator, one representative each from both human rights organizations, one representative of the armed forces, one from the peasants' federation and one from the labour federation. These commissioners were appointed to investigate disappearances between 1967 and 1982, however, the commission's mandate was limited in what could be investigated. While the commission was allowed to look into disappearances and track down the remains of some, the mandate itself did not cover other crimes against humanity, such as torture and kidnapping. This prevented the commissioners from accessing the whole truth. The commission succeeded in gathering evidence regarding 155 disappearances from the time period.

=== Problems ===
The main problem with the commission in Bolivia was its limited mandate. The mandate of the commission covered deaths and disappearances between 1967 and 1982, but did not allow investigation into kidnappings, illegal detention torture, and other cases of abuse. Loyola Guzmán, a representative from a human rights organization as well as the commission's executive secretary, attested that while some human remains were located, "no cases were conclusively investigated". The cases of 155 disappearances were investigated and documented, with remains found in certain cases, but the majority of the cases were "not thoroughly investigated".

In addition to its limited mandate, the commission had very little financial and political support from the government. Commissioners did not have access to all of the records required, and severely lacked funding. To add to this, the commission lacked the technical knowledge to identify the exhumed bodies correctly, preventing conclusive investigations into some deaths. The lack of sufficient resources and support eventually made continuing the work of the commission impossible. The commission was officially abandoned in 1984, less than two years after its inception.

=== Results ===
The National Commission of Inquiry Into Disappearances disbanded in 1984, and did not ever produce a final report of its findings. Commissioner Loyola Guzmán attempted to access the files of the commission in order to produce a report, but was unsuccessful. Whether the records were destroyed remains unknown, but attempts to recover the physical documents have not been successful.

== Justice after the commission ==
Despite the commission being unable to continue its work and disbanding, 1984 saw the beginning of the "Trials of Responsibility" (Spanish: Juicio de Responsabilidades). In the Trials of Responsibility, the Bolivian government former dictator Luis García Meza Tejada and 55 of his former associates on trial. These trials began in 1984, reaching a verdict in 1993. 49 of the former officials were convicted to serve prison sentences, while 6 were acquitted or died before or during the trials. García Meza was convicted of 36 different charges, resulting in a 234-year prison sentence, but would only serve 30 years (the maximum sentence under Bolivian law). The trial took nearly 10 years of compiling evidence and debating in order to reach a verdict, but the process was seen as positive and successful by organizations such as the Human Rights Watch, bringing justice and holding a number of officials accountable for crimes against humanity that occurred under past oppressive governments.

== See also ==
- National Commission on the Disappearance of Persons
- Rettig Report
