= Truth and Justice Commission =

Commission investigating slavery

- Active: 2009 – 2011
- Established: 1 February 2009
- Report Released: 25 November 2011
- Country: Mauritius
- Cost: 60 Million
- Chairman: Alexander Boraine
- Vice-Chairman: Vijayalakshmi Teelock
- Commissioners: Jacques David, Rephael Benjamin Moutou, Parmaseeven Verrapen
- Number of Staff: 101
- Type of Justice: Restorative
- Purpose: Investigate the effect of slavery and indentured labour in Mauritius.

The Truth and Justice Commission of Mauritius was an independent truth commission established in 2009, which explored the impact of slavery and indentured servitude in Mauritius. The Commission was tasked to investigate the dispossession of land, and “determine appropriate measures to be extended to descendants of slaves and indentured laborers.” It was “unique in that it [dealt] with socio-economic class abuses" and explored the possibility of reparations. The inclusion of reparations, whether for individuals or communities, was a controversial decision within the country which aimed to correct inequality. The Commission attempted to cover more than 370 years, the longest period of time that a truth commission has ever covered.

The Commission consisted of five members who were appointed by the then President Sir Anerood Jugnauth. The President selected Alex Boraine, the former deputy chair of the South African Truth and Reconciliation Commission, and four Mauritians to oversee the research and publication of a document consisting of seven volumes, and detailing over three centuries of Mauritian history.

The Truth and Justice Commission documented the "economics of colonialism, slavery, and indentured servitude, the experiences of indentured Africans, Indians, and French engagés, and living and working conditions on sugar estates." In order to aid Mauritians in reconciling the past the commission recommended: "1) memorializing slavery; 2) a better understanding and more inclusive account of Mauritian history and culture; 3) a better and increased protections of Mauritian heritage; 4) a less racist and elitist society; 5) a more democratic public life, and; 6) empowerment of Mauritians of African and Malagasy origin (Mauritian Creole people), as well as other recommendations to increase economic and social justice, particularly related to land issues and equitable and judicious use of the environment." Many of these recommendations have yet to be acted upon.

== Creation of Commission ==
The Truth and Justice Commission of Mauritius, beginning its work in February 2009, sought to explore the impact of slavery and indentured labour on the islands since colonization in 1638. Traditionally the historic narrative presented to Mauritians has been “the history of the ruling class consisting of French colons and their descendants.” Slavery and indentured labourers entry into the popular Mauritian historiography has been a recent phenomenon, something which the commission hoped to rectify.

Uniquely the Mauritian Truth commission sought to “investigate complaints of the dispossession of land, and to ‘determine appropriate measures to be extended to descendants of slaves and indentures labours.’" The inclusion of reparations, whether for individuals or communities, was a controversial decision within the country which aimed to correct inequality. Despite the advance brought by the last century many of Afro-Malagasy origin are living in poverty, while descendants of the plantation class enjoy higher living conditions, and importantly land ownership. The Truth and Justice Commission wished to correct this land owning imbalance on the islands.

Prime Minister Ramgoolam, calling for the creation of the commission, argued:

“Years have passed since slavery and indentured labor were abolished. The horrors of such brutality and bondage no longer exist today. But such treatment meted out to human beings does have its psychological impact, which can be permanent and as destructive if not more so, compared to physical slavery.”

The Prime Minister outlined his hopes for the commission stating:

The history of our country is based on a continuous quest for freedom and social justice. Our past has been marked by the forcible removal of thousands of people from the mainland of Africa, Madagascar and Asia. These are the darkest and most shameful pages of our history. The introduction of indentured labour under slavish conditions was no less shameful and evil.

Finally, the Prime Minister stated his hope that:

This Commission will pave the way to reconciliation, social justice and national unity through the process of re-establishing the historical truth. It is the legitimate expectation of everyone to know our true history. It is only after we have been faced with this reality that we can consolidate unity in our country. It is important therefore that we recognise our past history and lay that past to rest so that we can move on to reconciliation, justice and national unity.

== History of Slavery and Indentured Servitude in Mauritius ==
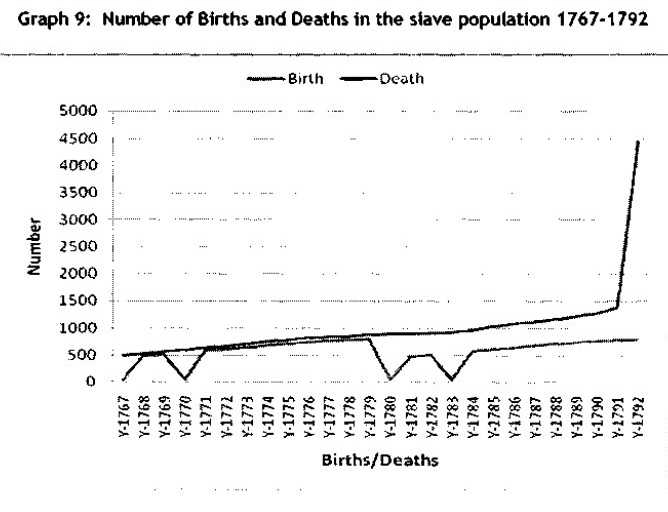
Top line represents deaths.

The Dutch East India Company introduced slavery to Mauritius in 1638. The labour force, largely from Batavia, were the preferred form of labour used by the Dutch. The company would maintain their control of the islands until 1710, leaving due to piracy, and the result of wars with both France and Britain. Before their exit however, the Dutch made several attempts to develop the slave trade in the Indian Ocean.

The French were the next colonial power to enter the Mauritians, taking possession of what they named Isle de France, in 1715. The French continued the Dutch practice of using slave labour in the islands agricultural sector. The Islands were ceded to the French East India Company who began dividing the land, the upper classes receiving 126 hectares and the soldiers and workers being given 63 hectares. Throughout the French rule of the territory, until its loss following the Treaty of Paris of 1814, the slave trade would continue to grow in economic importance in the Indian Ocean.

Following the defeat of Napoleon and the loss of Mauritius to Great Britain, the territory continued to rely upon slave labour until slavery's abolition in the British Empire in the 1830s. This would not end exploitation however, as the plantocracy, reliant upon cheap labour, turned to indentured labourers from India and China to work the fields. These labourers, having little rights, would be ruthlessly exploited by the planter class until the late colonial period.

== Commissioners ==
- Dr. Alexander Boraine - Chairperson from January 2010 until release of the report.
- Professor Robert Shell - Chairperson until November 2009.
- Dr. Vijayalakshmi Teelock - Vice-Chairperson
- Mr. Jacques David - Commissioner
- Mr. Rephael Benjamin Moutou - Commissioner
- Dr. Parmaseeven P. Veerapen - Commissioner
- Mr. Lindsay Morvan - Commissioner until April 2009.

During the first month of the Commission planning difficulties were experienced due to Professor Shell being unable to assume full-time chairmanship, visiting the Islands on three occasion during his tenure. A search began for a replacement, and with the aid of Archbishop Desmond Tutu, Dr. Alex Boraine was selected. Dr. Boraine, a South African Professor of Law, was one of the main architects of the Truth and Reconciliation Commission in South Africa, a commission often viewed as a model in the reconciliation process.

Lindsay Morvan, for personal reasons, was forced to resign as a member of the Commission in April 2010, replaced by Jacques David in July 2011.

== Mandate ==
The Truth and Justice Commission sought to “conduct inquiries into slavery and indentured labour in Mauritius during the colonial period.”

The Commission had as its mandate:

- Make an assessment of the consequences of slavery and indentured labour during the colonial period up to the present;
- Conduct inquiries into slavery and indentured labour in Mauritius during the colonial period and, for that purpose, gather information and receive evidence from any person;
- Determine appropriate reparative measures to be extended to descendants of slaves and indentured labourers;
- Enquire into complaints, other than a frivolous and vexatious complaints, made by any person aggrieved by a dispossession or prescription of any land in which he/she claimed to have an interest; and
- Prepare a comprehensive report of its activities, research and findings, based on factual and objective information and evidence received by it and submit the report to the President.

In addition, the Commission also had an underlying mandate to promote reconciliation. In Mauritius, "reconciliation was seen by many as being possible, only if one did not talk about one’s history. This was no longer possible in contemporary Mauritius."

== Activities of the Commission ==
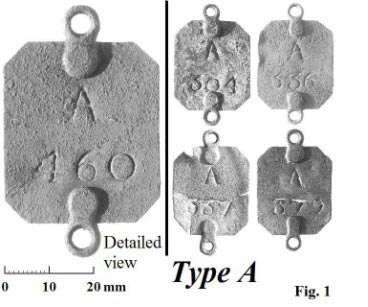
Collar worn by slaves.

In order to carry out its mandate the Commission "focused on three aspects: History; consequences, and how to achieve a more just society." To understand the 'Truth' of the past the Commission adopted the perspective of public historians, choosing to understand the perception of truth in Mauritian society, over a traditional historical understanding of the past often changing with new data. The commission conducted interviews, archival research, archival digs, and hearings while conducting their research, largely acting as oral historians.

The Commission sought the impute of all members of the public, asking those who wished to participate to submit notices. Over 400 cases relevant to the mandate were received, resulting in 230 hearings spanning 2 years. While conducting inquiries the Commission, wishing to streamline the process, identified 9 areas of interest to be researched. The areas were:

- Slave Trade and Indentured Immigration
- The Economics of slavery and indenture
- Land Issues
- Culture, Ethnicity, and Identity
- Health
- Education
- Demographic history and spatial distribution
- Monitoring and Communication of the Commission
- The territories of Rodrigues, Agalega, and Chagos.

Originally scheduled to complete their report in June 2011 the Commission requested an extension to September, then October, and finally to completion on 25 November 2011. The delay was primarily due to administrative problems experienced while finalizing the report.

== Findings and Recommendations ==
The Commission published its report in 2011 recommending:

- “That in the light of injustices suffered by descendants of slaves and indentured labourers, the Republic of Mauritius and other institutions make an official apology through the President of the Republic, the Prime Minister and private institutions connected with slavery and indenture, such as the Catholic Church, the Chamber of Commerce and the Mauritius Sugar Producers’ Association.”
- A memorial and Slave Museum be constructed to remember the inhuman treatment suffered by the victims constituting a crime against humanity. The Commission further recommended the 23rd of August be recognised as a Day of Remembrance and Reconciliation.
- The creation of an enhanced Technical College to train adult Creoles in an attempt to increase equity within Mauritian society. Creole be introduced in schools to aid working class families in understanding course material.
- The State, it is recommended, should consider granting small pieces of land to deserving citizens, and establish a “Land Monitoring and Research Unit” to assist persons in “their search for land which they believe [to be] rightly theirs.”

The report makes over 300 recommendations to the Mauritian government. These largely detail ways in which to bring those persons affected by slavery and indentured labour out of poverty.

== Impact and Criticism ==
The Truth and Justice Commission submitted its report to the President of Mauritius on 25 November 2011. In the subsequent 3 years several government committees were established to study the report and investigate which of the over 300 recommendations were to be implemented. These committees have provided little feedback and the implementation of recommendations made by the Commission has been so slow in coming that Parmaseeven Veerapen, a former commissioner, has accused the government committees of being little more than an "eyewash." In December 2020 Jean Claude de l’Estrac published a book titled Terres Possession et Dépossession which also highlights the lack of action by the sugar industry and politicians. De L'Estrac also writes about the persistent social injustice, the adverse effects of ethnic politics, and the confusion caused by recent legal changes to 'acquisition by prescription'. It is unclear if the recommendations forwarded to the government will ever be implemented throughout the country.
