= Truth and Reconciliation Commission (Germany) =

Truth commission that lasted from 1992 to 1994

Germany's flag

Two years after German reunification, the Commission of Inquiry for the Assessment of History and Consequences of the SED Dictatorship in Germany, which was a truth commission that lasted from 1992 to 1994, was established by the German government with the objective of looking at the history and the consequences of the former East German communist government. It released its report in 1994, but some felt that more could be investigated. This resulted in the establishment of the Commission of Inquiry on Overcoming the Consequences of the SED Dictatorship in the Process of German Unity lasting from 1994 to 1998, which had the same objective, but investigated more thoroughly.

Both commissions had to look at the dictatorship itself and the human rights violation under the rule of the East German Socialist Unity Party (SED). The second commission, however, was more focused on the effects on everyday life than on the human rights violations.

The idea of a commission was brought up by the non-governmental organization Human Rights Watch. There were many issues over racism and human rights violation after the unification in 1989, and Human Rights Watch therefore recommended the creation of a commission that would look at human rights violations in the former East Germany. In the same year the first commission was created for "the purpose of truly unifying Germany".

== Germany after World War II ==
After World War II, Germany was divided in two parts, East Germany which was called the German Democratic Republic (GDR) and was led by the Socialist Unity Party (SED), and West Germany which was called the Federal Republic of Germany and was governed by the Western Allied powers (United States, United Kingdom, France).

=== East Germany ===
East Germany was a communist state under Soviet influence. The GDR claimed full employment. As Sue Lawson writes, "even the lowest earners could manage a reasonable, if modest, standard of living. Poverty, homelessness and dependence on benefits hardly existed." East Germans did not worry about finding a job: "In the old GDR you were never unemployed."

There was a demographic issue because of the low birth rate which caused employment issues, and for that reason the GDR decided to create laws that would help parents to have children and to work at the same time. There were advantages for people who married before age 30. They had access to interest-free loans, and the repayment of the loan would diminish every time they had a child. This led to an increase in childbirth and overall population. The status of women was valued in East Germany. Almost all women able to work could have a job at the same time as having children, though this did mean more work for many women in both employment and child care.

In time, demands in the GDR for freedom of expression, travel and assembly rose. As East Germans started to see other Eastern European communist countries throwing off Soviet control, citizens started to protest and in 1989, the peaceful revolution started. In August 1989, many East Germans tried to leave the GDR for West Germany. In September 1989, many went to Hungary because it had opened its doors to Austria, and from Austria, they could reach West Germany. Weekly demonstrations began to take place: every Monday, people would protest in the street and ask for freedom under the slogan Wir sind das Volk, "we are the people". In October, Erich Honecker, the leader of East Germany, had no choice but to resign. On 9 November, cabinet member Günter Schabowski announced the "immediate freedom of travel for East German citizens". All these protests and demonstrations led to the unification of both Germanies on 3 October 1990.

=== West Germany ===
West Germany had a similar demographic problem to the one in the East, but implemented a different solution. Rather than attempting to increase birth rates, West Germany imported foreign "guest workers". There was no attempt to further integrate women into the economic system. If a woman was a mother, she would work part-time or not at all. West Germany's priority was economic growth, rather than maternity and childcare, and for that reason people that were unemployed had to resort to welfare benefits.

== After unification ==
=== Economy ===
After the Unification, Germany realized that absorbing the GDR would be costly. East Germany was poorer than West Germany, putting strain on the finances of the new, unified government. By 1991, the government was forced to increase taxes to stem the budget deficit. Unemployment in the former East Germany became a major problem and differences were more visible because the West had a lower percent of unemployment than the East. The unification also affected Europe's economy, contributing to "a European currency crisis in 1992".

=== Women ===
Women seemed to be more affected by unification and the transition than men. In the old East Germany, some women had access to "unpaid child care leave until the child started school, and then return to a similar job". Once both Germanies were unified, women lost these advantages. Their economic situation was not as secure as before due to a shortage of jobs. Consequently, many women faced early retirement as they lost their former job security.

== Human Rights Watch ==
In 1992, the organization Human Rights Watch sent a mission to Germany to analyze racism and human rights violations in the country following unification. The group suggested that Germany created a truth and reconciliation commission to investigate these current problems as well as East Germany's past. As a result the Commission of Inquiry for the Assessment of History and Consequences of the SED Dictatorship in Germany was established in 1992 by the German government.

== The 1992 commission (Commission of Inquiry for the Assessment of History and Consequences of the SED Dictatorship in Germany) ==
The commission was created on May 14, 1992, and released its report in June 1994. It was set up by members of the German Parliament in March 1992. In the early 1990s, all archives of the GDR as well as the SED were made available to scholars. When the commission began, the commissioners had access to all the records that could be found.

The commission had 27 members, led by the East German parliamentarian and human rights activist Rainer Eppelmann. Other members included Markus Meckel, Gerd Poppe, Dr. Dorothea Wils, Dirk Hansen, and Dr. Dietman Keller.

=== Establishment ===
Germany established a truth commission as a result of ongoing social tensions and problems affecting the country, in hopes that it would be a solution. Additionally, many Germans wanted answers about the SED dictatorship and "about the possibilities of political and moral rehabilitation of the victims". The German government and parliament also felt strongly about the commission, believing that it was essential to unify Germany. Instead of retributive justice, the German Parliament opted for a focus on restorative justice because of ongoing social problems, aiming at non-violent reconciliation of those problems.

=== Mandate ===
The mandate had two main objectives. The first was to help the victims of the GDR and the SED. The second was about reconciliation. Germany needed to be reconciled with its past so it needed to develop a common political culture. To do so, the commission had to look at human rights violations. It had to examine every aspect of the dictatorship, how it functioned, what was its ideology and theology, what responsibilities it had for human rights violations, and what role it played in the destruction of the environment. The commission also had to investigate which groups were oppressed and to think about ways they could give restitution to these oppressed groups. The commission needed to look at the opposition in East Germany and its actions, as well as the role of the Lutheran Church. The influences of "international framework conditions" (more precisely, Soviet politics), needed to be investigated, as did the relation between both Germanies. The commission's mandate included research covering the years from 1945 until 1989.

The commission also needed to include scholarly expertise, public hearings and forums, as well as discussion with citizens.

=== Recommendations ===
The commission's recommendations included:

- the creation of national holidays, including the unification date (3 October)
- documentary centers and a map of the governing buildings used by the SED so people would be aware of their past and could achieve reconciliation. The commission hoped that would also help to build a common political culture and shared historical knowledge to have a truly unified Germany
- the exchange of information with Eastern European countries
- a permanent foundation to implement the recommendations and try to help victims from the SED period.

=== Conclusions ===
The most notable impact the first commission had was the establishment of a subsequent commission to further investigate matters that the first one had not addressed. Parliament opted to wait for the report of the second commission before taking any decisions on the recommendations of the first commission.

=== Criticism ===
"However, a great deal of criticism was voiced by victims of the GDR dictatorship that the support rendered by the state came late, was too limited, and did not cover all groups of victims." There were also some victims that talked about victors' justice. For example, "At the universities, a comprehensive screening took place. Many professors and lecturers were dismissed on the basis of Stasi documents and other evidence showing that they had worked as informers for the Stasi or were SED members. There were number of protests by the accused and their supporters who felt that these dismissals were unjust and constituted revenge."

== The 1995 commission (Commission of Inquiry on Overcoming the Consequences of the SED Dictatorship in the Process of German Unity) ==
The second commission ran from July 1995 to June 1998, and focused primarily on aspects of the mandate that had not been examined by the earlier commission. Rainer Eppelmann stayed on as chairman of the commission, but the number of commissioners increased to 36, who were later divided into 9 groups. All commissioners were chosen by the German parliament.

=== Mandate ===
The second commission followed the same mandate as the first, but focused more on aspects of everyday life under the SED dictatorship, such as discrimination against women, education and economic effects. The mandate also analyzed social effects, science and culture in East Germany as well as unified Germany, focusing on both past and present.

=== Recommendations, reparations and aftermath ===
The recommendations from the second commission were essentially the same as the first, but also added the need to educate the people about their past. Discarding the call for this to be done through a dedicated foundation, commissioners suggested that people could learn about their past in schools instead. They called again for a permanent and independent foundation that would follow up the recommendations, investigate the past, preserve the commission's archives, and provide assistance to the victims of the SED.

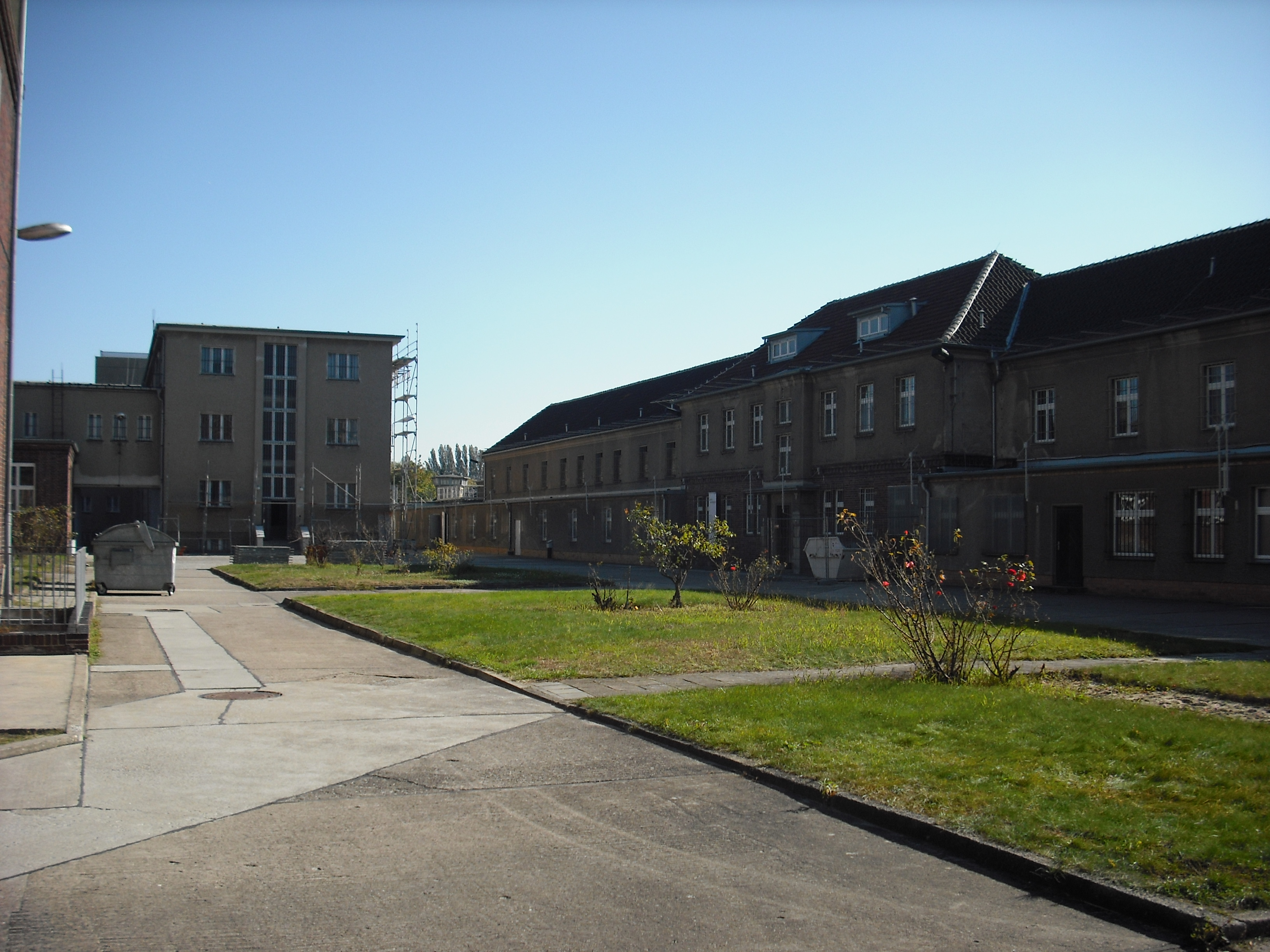
Hohenschönhausen

As opposed to the first commission, this one convinced parliament and the government to create the independent foundation that would, in a sense, continue the work of both commissions. This foundation was called the "Stiftung zur Aufarbeitung der SED-Diktatur" (Foundation for the Reappraisal of the SED Dictatorship). It was created on 5 June 1998. There was also a memorial built in Berlin. Another foundation was created and named "Hohenschönhausen". The mandate of this foundation was to investigate history and to educate the public about it. In 2007, there a law passed to give reparations to persons that were prisoners during the SED dictatorship.

The Stiftung zur Aufarbeitung der SED-Diktatur helped creating the law to give reparation to the victims of the SED. They expanded the reparations to victims other than just political prisoners.
