= Truth commission =

Commission tasked with discovering and revealing past wrongdoing

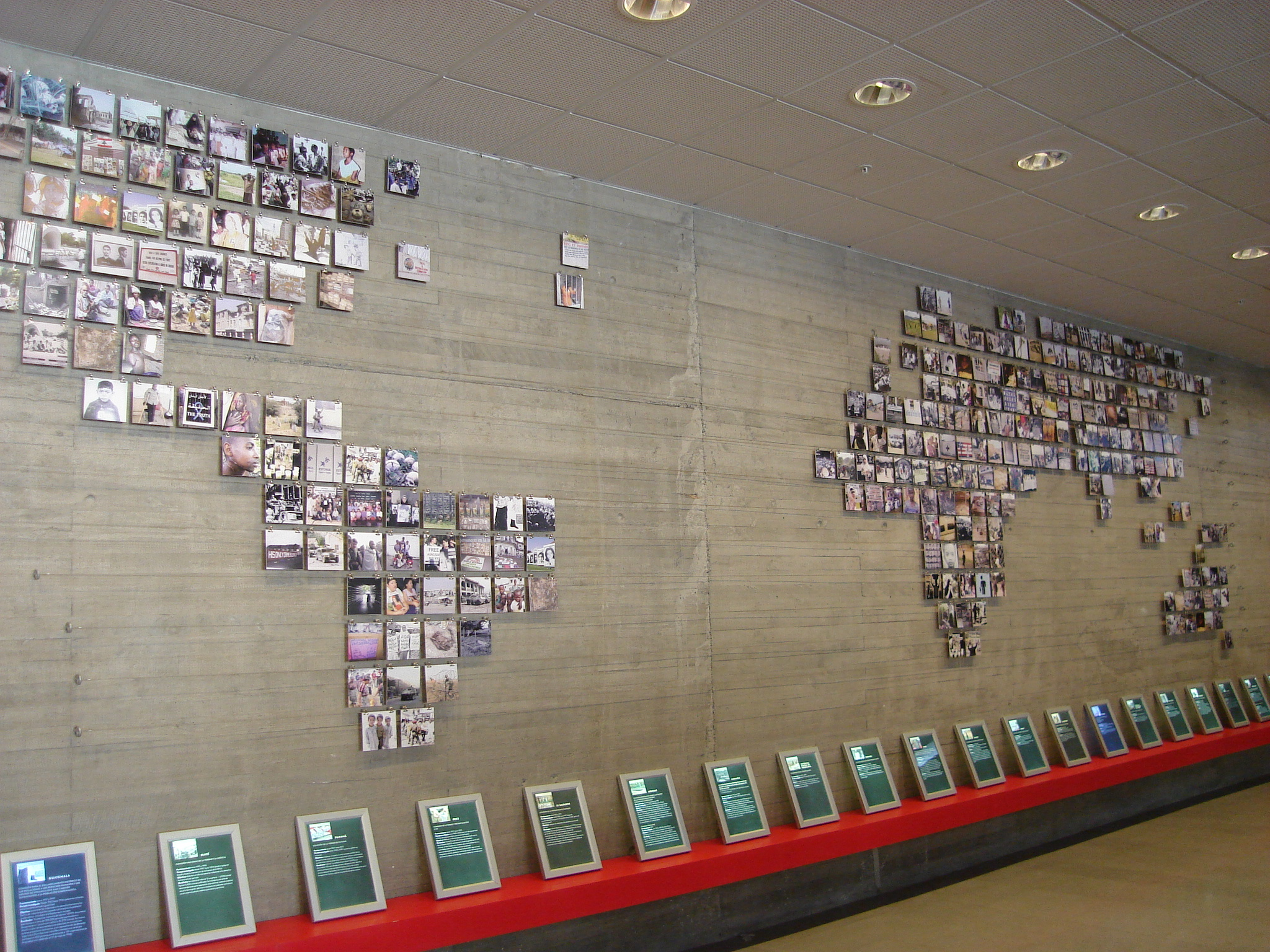
A world map showing all the truth and reconciliation commissions in Museum of Memory and Human Rights, Santiago, Chile

A truth commission, also known as a truth and reconciliation commission or truth and justice commission, is an official body tasked with discovering and revealing past wrongdoing by a government (or, depending on the circumstances, non-state actors also), in the hope of resolving conflict left over from the past. Truth commissions are, under various names, occasionally set up by states emerging from periods of internal unrest, civil war, or dictatorship marked by human rights abuses. In both their truth-seeking and reconciling functions, truth commissions have political implications: they "constantly make choices when they define such basic objectives as truth, reconciliation, justice, memory, reparation, and recognition, and decide how these objectives should be met and whose needs should be served".

== Definition ==
According to one widely cited definition:

A truth commission (1) is focused on past, rather than ongoing, events; (2) investigates a pattern of events that took place over a period of time; (3) engages directly and broadly with the affected population, gathering information on their experiences; (4) is a temporary body, with the aim of concluding with a final report; and (5) is officially authorized or empowered by the state under review.

— Priscilla Hayner, Unspeakable Truths: Transitional Justice and the Challenge of Truth Commissions

The term used in the Australian context of reconciliation with its Indigenous peoples is truth telling.

== Functions ==
=== Truth-seeking ===
As bodies mandated by governments, truth commissions constitute a form of "official truth-seeking". Thus they can provide proof against denialism of state terrorism and other crimes and human rights abuses. Increasingly, supporters assert a "right to the truth" that commissions are well placed to carry forward. Truth commissions are sometimes criticised for allowing crimes to go unpunished, and creating impunity for serious human rights abusers. Their roles and abilities in this respect depend on their mandates, which vary widely.

One of the difficult issues that has arisen over the role of truth commissions in transitional societies, has centered on what should be the relationship between truth commissions and criminal prosecutions. While it is generally assumed that truth and reconciliation commissions could investigate on a larger number of crimes, they are less effective in pursuing criminal punishment. This leads to the idea that truth and reconciliation commissions are effective to heal large societal conflicts, but they should also be matched with criminal trials for the top criminal offenders.

In general, truth commissions issue final reports which seek to provide an authoritative narrative of past events, which sometimes challenges previously dominant versions of the past. Truth commissions emphasizing "historical clarification" include the Historical Clarification Commission in Guatemala with its focus on setting straight the former military government's version of the past, and the Truth and Justice Commission in Mauritius which focused on the legacy of slavery and indentured servitude over a long colonial period. The Commission for Reception, Truth and Reconciliation in East Timor also aimed to tell a new "national narrative" to replace the version of history that had been prevalent under foreign rule.

=== Reconciliation ===
Within the scope of transitional justice, truth commissions tend to lean towards restorative rather than retributive justice models. This means they often favour efforts to reconcile divided societies in the wake of conflict, or to reconcile societies with their own troubled pasts, over attempts to hold those accused of human rights violations accountable. Less commonly, truth commissions advocate forms of reparative justice, efforts to repair past damage and help victims of conflict or human rights violations to heal. This can take the form of reparations to victims, whether financial or otherwise; official apologies; commemorations or monuments to past human rights violations, or other forms. Reparations have been central, for instance, in Morocco's Equity and Reconciliation Commission.

Reconciliation forms a crucial aspect of most commissions. In some cases, peace agreements or the terms of transfers of power prevent court prosecutions and allow impunity for former rulers accused of human rights violations or even crimes against humanity, and truth commissions appear as the major alternative. In other cases, governments see the opportunity to unite divided societies and offer truth and reconciliation commissions as the way to reach that goal. Truth commissions formed part of peace settlements in El Salvador, Congo, Kenya, and others.

Commissions often hold public hearings in which victims/survivors can share their stories and sometimes confront their former abusers. These processes sometimes include the hope of forgiveness for past crimes and the hope that society can thereby be healed and made whole again. The public reconciliation process is sometimes praised for offering a path to reconciliation, and sometimes criticised by main stake holders (victim associations, relatives of the disappeared, ex-perpetrators) for promoting impunity and further traumatising victims. The criticism is mainly due to the fact that in many cases the aspect of "reconciliation" is rather perceived as a political slogan, a "feel good" label attached to the process, often a truth commission, while the actions taken as part of the commission's work do little to convey the semantics of the concept of reconciliation, sometimes even counteracting its very notion. This was e.g. quite tangible in the South African case, where the heard facts about the committed wrongdoings during the commission hearings did not lead to what the victims perceived to be administering justice to achieve reconciliation: "We've heard the truth. There is even talk about reconciliation. But where's the justice?" As such, the lack of consequences for the truth-telling as part of similar commissions to which the label of "reconciliation" is attached is rather considered by many as a revictimization, this time by the hands of the new authorities which are supposed to rectify the past wrongs.

On some occasions, truth commissions have been criticized for narrow mandates or lack of implementation after their reports. Examples include Chad's Commission of Inquiry into Crimes and Misappropriations committed by former president Hissene Habre and the Philippines Truth Commission which has been criticized as selective justice. A short-lived Commission of Truth and Reconciliation in Yugoslavia never reported as the country that created it ceased to exist. In others, such as Rwanda, it has been impossible to carry out commission recommendations due to a return to conflict.

== History ==
The first truth commissions did not use the name, but aimed to unearth the truth about human rights violations under military regimes, predominantly in Latin America. Bolivia established a National Commission of Inquiry Into Disappearances in 1982 based on bringing together disparate sectors of society after the end of military rule, but the commission never reported. An earlier and perhaps the first such commission occurred in Uganda in 1974, and was known as the Truth Commission: Commission of Inquiry into the Disappearances of People in Uganda since 25 January 1971.

The first such commission to be effective was Argentina's National Commission on the Disappearance of Persons, created by President of Argentina Raúl Alfonsín on 15 December 1983. It issued the Nunca Más (Never Again) report, which documented human rights violations under the military dictatorship known as the National Reorganization Process. The report was delivered to Alfonsín on 20 September 1984 and opened the door to the Trial of the Juntas, the first major trial held for war crimes since the Nuremberg trials in Germany following World War II and the first to be conducted by a civilian court.

Ugandan president Yoweri Museveni established the Commission of Inquiry into Violations of Human Rights (CIVHR) in 1986 to investigate human rights abuses under his predecessors Idi Amin and Milton Obote. The commission suffered from under-resourcing and did not deliver its report until 1994. In Chile, shortly after the country's return to democracy, a Truth and Reconciliation Commission was established in April 1990. It was the first to use the name and most truth commissions since then have used a variation on the title. Other early commissions were established in diverse locations including Nepal (1990), El Salvador (1992), Guatemala (1994), and Ireland (1994).

== South Africa ==
South Africa's truth and reconciliation commission was formed in 1995, in the aftermath of apartheid, as a deal between the former white-minority regime and the African National Congress. Formal hearings began on 16 April 1996. The ANC's call for "truth" about the apartheid years combined with the ruling National Party's demand for amnesty for many of the perpetrators of apartheid to create the hybrid "truth and reconciliation" commission led by Bishop Desmond Tutu. During the truth and reconciliation commission, there were three committees and 17 commissioners in total. The three committees created were the Human Rights Violations, Amnesty, and the Rehabilitation and reparation committees.

Approximately 7,000 individuals applied for amnesty, but only 10 percent received it. Those who violated human rights and followed the criteria did receive it. The criteria required individuals to not only fully admit to their crimes, but also to prove that their crimes were politically motivated. Those who supported the hybrid truth commission hoped it would heal the wounds of the past, give dignity to victims, and permit the emergence of a post-apartheid "rainbow nation" led by Nelson Mandela. To further heal the wounds, the commission recommended that there be a "wealth tax", which would punish those who gained from apartheid, but South Africa never followed through. South Africa has not formally inserted any reparation programs. With South Africa being the first to mandate a truth and reconciliation commission, it has become a model for other countries. Commissions have been widespread in the aftermath of conflict as components of peace agreements in Africa since the 1990s.

== Other commissions ==
Following South Africa's truth and reconciliation commission, many more truth commissions have been created and continue to be created. These include repeat commissions in some countries where the first commission was constrained and new governments felt it had not carried out a full accounting for the past. It has become a model for other countries. Commissions have been widespread in the aftermath of conflict as components of peace agreements in Africa since the 1990. For example, Congo and Sierra Leone have used truth commissions. Chile's Commission for Truth and Reconciliation was followed by a Commission on Political Imprisonment and Torture in 2003. Approximately 3,000 people died or went missing during the years of Augusto Pinochet's rule. Pinochet's successor created the first commission in 1990. In Brazil, the National Truth Commission was proposed by the 3rd National Human Rights Program to investigate the crimes of the military dictatorship (1964–1985) and came into force in 2012. The Nepalese Truth Commission was followed by a new commission in 2014; and there have been calls for a new truth commission to supplement the Panama Truth Commission established in 2000.

In Scandinavia, Nordic countries have set up Sámi reconciliation commissions to investigate indigenous injustices.

Germany has held two truth commissions on human rights violations in the former East Germany.

== Reconciliation with indigenous peoples ==
Commissions have also started to operate with targeted mandates related to Indigenous peoples or the aftermath of colonialism.

=== Australia ===
The term used in Australia is "truth telling", and calls for a truth-telling commission about past injustices have been made over a long period into the 21st century. The Council for Aboriginal Reconciliation discussed the topic in a 2000 report which followed a nine-year process of community consultation about how Aboriginal and Torres Strait Islander and non-Indigenous Australians could move forward together. The Referendum Council, which was established to consult with Aboriginal and Torres Strait Islander peoples about their views on constitutional recognition, highlighted the importance of truth-telling in its 2017 final report.

The Joint Select Committee on Constitutional Recognition relating to Aboriginal and Torres Strait Islander Peoples was appointed in March 2018, and presented its final report on 29 November 2018. There were four recommendations in the report. Recommendation 3 was: "The Committee recommends that the Australian Government support the process of truth-telling. This could include the involvement of local organisations and communities, libraries, historical societies and Aboriginal and Torres Strait Islander associations. Some national coordination may be required, not to determine outcomes but to provide incentive and vision. These projects should include both Aboriginal and Torres Strait Islander peoples and descendants of local settlers".

In October 2018 a symposium was held by the Healing Foundation and Reconciliation Australia to share knowledge about the importance of truth telling, examine what truths need to be told in Australia, look at different truth-telling practices that might be applicable to Australia, and work on some guiding principles for future truth-telling processes. The symposium was attended by 60 experts, leaders and key stakeholders in the field.

In July 2019, Minister for Indigenous Australians Wyatt gave an address to the National Press Club, in which he spoke of the theme of NAIDOC Week 2019: "Voice. Treaty. Truth.". With regard to truth-telling, he said he would "work on approaches to work on how we progress towards truth-telling".

In July 2020, the Victorian Government became the first government in Australia to commit to the creation of a truth and justice commission, to "formally recognise historical wrongs and ongoing injustices". The Yoorrook Justice Commission aims to establish an official public record of the experience of Aboriginal Victorians since the start of British colonisation in Victoria. Its findings will include recommendations for reform and redress, and will inform Victoria's treaty negotiations. In September 2023 Yoorrook proposed 46 recommendations to improve the child protection and criminal justice systems in Victoria, including raising the age of criminal responsibility from 10 to 14 years of age.

=== Canada ===
Canada's Truth and Reconciliation Commission focused on the legacies of Canadian Indian residential schools and Indigenous-settler relations. Canada had sanctioned a program that allowed the kidnapping of native children in order to assimilate them. The commission was established in 2006 as part of the settlement of a class-action lawsuit in which nearly 4,600 residential school survivors had sued the federal government. In June 2015, the Canadian Truth and Reconciliation Commission released a summary report of its findings, concluding that the school system amounted to cultural genocide. Estimates of the number of Indigenous children who died while attending these schools range from 3,200 to over 30,000.

=== Norway ===
In 2018, the Norwegian parliament commissioned The Norwegian Truth and Reconciliation Commission to lay the foundation for recognition of the experiences of the Sámi.

=== Sweden ===
Sweden has faced criticism for its Swedification policies, which began in the 1800s and lasted until the 1970s. In 2020, Sweden funded the establishment of an independent truth commission to examine and document past abuse of the Sámi by the Swedish.

== See also ==
- Right to truth
- Human rights commission
- The German policy of Vergangenheitsbewältigung is commonly compared to truth and reconciliation
- Institute for Justice and Reconciliation
- Transitional Justice Institute
- Pact of Forgetting
