= International Commission of Investigation on Human Rights Violations in Rwanda since October 1, 1990 =

The International Commission of Investigation on Human Rights Violations in Rwanda since October 1, 1990 was an international inquiry that investigated reported human rights abuses during the Rwandan Civil War. Sponsored by four international non-governmental organizations, the commission was not officially mandated by the Rwandan government. Ten commissioners from eight countries spent two weeks in Rwanda visiting prefectures and documenting oral and written accounts, along with exhuming reported locations of mass grave burials. Primarily, the inquiry examined three major massacres that occurred between 1990 and 1992. The commission lasted three months and the final report was released in March 1993. Due to the dates of its investigation, the commission did not cover the Rwandan genocide, which followed in April 1994.

In its final report, the commission concluded that the Rwandan government was directly responsible for approximately 2,000 civilian deaths, the majority of whom were Tutsi. It held responsible all levels of governmental authority and cited that local officials often led attacks and encouraged Hutu citizens to take part. Most of these officials maintained their job at the time of the report and none had been judicially prosecuted. The report found that the Rwandan judicial system was unable to appropriately deal with matters of justice pertaining to the Civil War, as the courts themselves had been responsible for mass abuses. Rebel forces, called the Rwandan Patriotic Front, were also responsible for kidnapping, expelling, and killing an unspecified number of Rwandan citizens.

== Background ==
=== Hutu, Tutsi and the Rwandan Civil War ===
Since the nation's independence from Belgium in 1962, ethnic tensions have been intertwined in Rwanda's post-colonial history. As the ethnic majority, the first independent government was dominated by Hutu representatives. Over years of political instability and ethnic oppression, hundreds of thousands of Tutsi refugees fled to neighbouring countries, namely Burundi and Uganda. It was among the Tutsi refugees that the political organization Rwandan Patriotic Front (RPF) eventually found its genesis. By 1987, the RPF perceived a return to Rwanda would only be successful through armed action. On October 1, 1990, the RPF crossed the border and launched an attack on Rwandan soil. In response, the Hutu-dominated government, led by President Juvénal Habyarimana, launched counterattacks on the "Tutsi threat". The country was thrust into three years of civil war that saw both government and guerrilla forces commit mass atrocities. A ceasefire was reached in July 1992 and by August 1993, the Arusha Accords were signed to signify the end of civil conflict and the intended creation of a power-sharing government.

== Creation of the Commission ==
=== Appeal to the international community ===
As part of an agreement of the Arusha Accords – a series of negotiations meant to mark the end of the Civil War – the Rwandan government and rebel leaders signed off on the establishment of an inquiry into the human rights abuses of the past three years. Initially, government officials had invited a single French NGO to create the commission, however, the request was declined. Consequently, a handful of Rwandan human rights groups appealed to the international community requesting aid in the formation and implementation of a truth commission to investigate the events of the previous three years. In response, four international non-governmental organizations offered their resources and capital:

- International Federation of Human Rights (Paris)
- Africa Watch (New York, Washington, London)
- Interafrican Union for Human Rights and Rights of Peoples (Ouagadougou, Burkina Faso)
- International Center for Human Rights and Democratic Development (Montreal)

Due to its non-governmental nature, the commission did not have an official mandate, nor was it considered an official national inquiry.

=== Commissioners ===
The inquiry was carried out by ten commissioners from eight different countries, representing various fields of law, human rights, and forensic sciences. When working with potential mass graves, the commissioners worked with four speleologists. The Rwandan human rights organizations arranged international fundraising, as well as organized logistics for the commissioners when they were in Rwanda; however, this was their extent of involvement in the investigation. The official report lists the commissioners as the following:

- Jean Carbonare, Act Together for Human Rights, Paris
- Philippe Dahinden, Doctor of Law, journalist, Lausanne
- René Degni-Seguit, Dean of the Law faculty, University of Abidjan, President of the Ivorian League of Human Rights
- Alison Des Forges, Africa Watch and State University of New York at Buffalo
- Pol Dodinval, forensic physician, Faculty of Medicine, Liege
- Eric Gillet, International Federation of Human Rights, member of the Bar of Brussels
- Rein Odink, jurist, Amsterdam
- Haligou Ouedraogo, President of International Union for Human Rights and Rights of Peoples, Judge of the Administrative Chamber, Supreme Court of Burkina Faso
- André Paradis, Director General of the League of Rights and Liberties, Montreal

== Process ==
The full extent of the commission's investigations took place over two weeks in January 1993 when the commission travelled to Rwanda. The commission's presence in the country spread through word of mouth and the Rwandan media. Commissioners took testimonies from survivors and witnesses, analyzed government documents, and exhumed several mass graves.

=== Reports of intimidation ===
President Habyarimana officially welcomed the commission to Rwanda when it arrived in January 1993, and by most accounts, the Rwandan government cooperated with the inquiry. There were, however, reports of intimidation and violence against those who were to speak with commissioners. Two days before the commission's arrival, a series of attacks were carried out on individuals who were expected to aid the investigation during its time in the country. Monique Mujawamariya, the executive director of Rwandan Association for Human Rights and Public Freedoms, one of the civil society groups that had arranged the commission's visit to Rwanda, was involved in a suspicious transportation accident prior to the commission's arrival. Furthermore, Mujawamariya was threatened by a military official in front of the commissioners.

In the days following the inquiry's departure, government forces resumed mass killings of hundreds of civilians – some of whom had aided the commission. Alison Des Forges, co-chair of the commission, noted that the deaths could not be decisively considered as the result of the individuals' connection to the commission. Reports of violence include a violent attack on the family of a man who had given testimony, followed by the forced suicide of the man's father. In response to these new reports, a United Nations Special Rapporteur requested, and was granted, a visit to Rwanda to "assess the situation firsthand". The findings of the visit are published in a final report presented to the United Nations Commission on Human Rights.

== Findings ==
=== Massacres ===
In the three major massacres that were investigated – which were themselves composed of a series of attacks over multiple days – the commission concluded that Rwandan authorities at all levels of administration held varying degrees of responsibilities. Most attacks were incited, encouraged, and led by civilian authorities, while Rwandan soldiers aided those that took place close to military bases. Given the timing, the presented pretext, and the habit of laying the blame on victims rather than perpetrators, the inquiry asserted that there was sufficient evidence of large, country-wide planning. By most accounts, the reactions of policing authorities were "slow, weak and unconcerned" and the judiciary had failed to prosecute alleged attackers.

The massacre in Kibilira began on October 11, 1990, ten days after the beginning of the civil war, in a commune where Tutsi and Hutu had previously lived a relatively peaceful co-existence. At a meeting of communal councillors, the assistant prefect showed two dead bodies to the members present and claimed they were Hutu killed by Tutsi. He told the councillors to go home "sensitize the population" to the necessity of security measures. Authorities then incited civilians to burn the homes of Tutsi, under the pretext that there was a larger plan to exterminate the Hutu. Some councillors spread false rumours about military authorities being murdered and a fabricated story of a Tutsi killing children at local schools.

Testimony given to the commission established a systematic targeting of the Tutsi population by local authorities who knew the villages, as Tutsi homes were ravaged but Hutu homes were untouched. As the attacks continued, targets shifted from Tutsi homes to Tutsi civilians themselves. One councillor incited killings by telling attackers "you’re doing nothing but killing and eating the cattle instead of showing me skulls." From October 11 to October 13, 348 civilians were killed, 550 houses were burned, and nearly all animals and food had been pillaged. It took authorities 48 hours to respond.

The massacre of the Bagogwe, a sub-group of Tutsi, was lesser known outside of the areas along the Gishwati forest where they lived. Within their prefectures, movement was limited by roadblocks, which prevent victims from fleeing and journalists and investigators from entering. Due to the area's isolation, authorities, including the president, were able to aptly deny the killings that took the lives of up to 1000 Tutsi. The attacks were a result of the surprising domination by the RPF in the city of Ruhengeri, who then freed all prisoners from the city's jails. The Bagogwe, along with other Tutsi, were blamed for having helped the RPF and the massacre ensued. From January to March 1991, civilians were killed with stones, spears, sticks, and guns and the burial of bodies was often done under the pretext of mandatory community labour. From speaking with a former Rwandan secret agent, the commission heard that high authorities planned the massacre in January, before the RPF had gained control of Ruhengeri. President Habyarimana was present at the meeting and "acquiesced" to the proposed massacres "with a nod."

Having heard that bodies were frequently dumped in caves, the commission searched for mass graves while investigating the massacre. Speleologists found evidence of possible sites of burial but due to limited materials and the unwillingness of witnesses to disclose exact locations, few were found. Exceptionally, a burial site was found in the backyard of a local official who claimed no prior knowledge of its existence, while another was found beside a field.

The massacres in the region of Bugesera took place from March 5th to March 9th 1992, during which 277 people were killed and 15,000 were forced to flee their homes. Rwandan media, particularly Radio Rwanda, played an important role in spreading anti-Tutsi propaganda in the months leading up to the attacks culminating on March 3 when the station repeatedly warned of Tutsi plans to assassinate Hutu leaders. Police and soldiers were dispatched from Kigali upon news of the attacks, however, the massacre continued for four days. Witness testimonies led commissioners to conclude that assailants included soldiers in civilian clothing. On March 9, authorities ordered thousands of displaced people to return home. Having nothing to return to and not wanting to risk their lives, the displaced were unwilling to move. In response, authorities ordered their water supply cut off.

The report summarized the massacres as follows:

"…the massacres since October 1990 were neither accidental nor spontaneous, but the result of deliberate decisions taken at the highest levels. In the high structured Rwandan society, the authorities easily exercised power. Preparation for the massacres can sometimes be traced to long before the actual event…In executing the massacres, the key actors have ranged from local prefect authorities to members of the cell committee. In the cases of the Bagogwe massacre and the massacre in Bugesera, the military cooperated with the authorities in inciting people to attack their neighbours and in helping to carry out the killings."

=== The Question of Genocide ===
On April 15, 1975, Rwanda signed the Genocide Convention thus forbidding genocide, along with any threats, incitements or complacency to commit genocide. Based on the testimony given to the commission, the majority of victims were killed based on their Tutsi ethnicity, demonstrating intent to murder members of an ethnic group. It was stated, however, that the casualty figures, while tragic, "may be below the threshold required to establish genocide." The commission also noted complications due to the increasing number of targets who were Hutu political opponents to the Rwandan government.

=== Human Rights Abuses by the Rwandan Government ===
The commission documents abuses by the Forces Armée Rwandaise (FAR), which included both the national police and the military. Civilians were arrested for allegedly sympathizing with or aiding the RPF and would be severely beaten, killed, or disappear. Testimonies reported large summary executions, rape, forced labour, and looting. After pressure from the international community, the Rwandan government created a commission to investigate these abuses, which condemned the failure of authorities to prevent or stop the killings but stopped short of holding individuals accountable. In at least two cases, the FAR faked military attacks on the RPF to provide justification for mass arrests, including the arrest of up to 10,000 people in October 1990, some of whom were summarily executed. The inquiry heard evidence of violations of international law, including the FAR killing RPF soldiers who had surrendered and the judicial failure to investigate military attacks on civilians. In the conclusion of the final report, it writes "President Habyarimana and his immediate entourage bear heavy responsibility for these massacres and other abuses."

=== Human Rights Abuses by the Rwanda Patriotic Front ===
The commission primarily investigated the actions of the Rwandan government and the FAR, however from gathered testimony, the report acknowledges abuses by the RPF. The commission highlighted attacks on civilian targets, including a camp for displaced persons and a clinic, along with apparently random killings in villages. Summary executions, looting and destruction of property went seemingly unpunished. There were reports of conscription in the displaced camps, along with theft of animals and food supplies. The RPF was responsible for forced expulsion of populations, using some as porters and cattle herders to carry goods and justifying other movements as part of a strategy to empty combat zones from possible human casualties. Commissioners met with Rwandans in occupied RPF zones, from where they were able to choose individuals to give testimony. They were, however, unable to meet with the individuals privately. None of the witnesses complained of abuses but rather spoke of a desire to return home. Civilians were able to move between RPF sectors only after permission was granted and identity papers were submitted and all civilians were required to cultivate four days a week to benefit the larger community.

== Recommendations ==
In its final report, the inquiry made a series of recommendations to President Habyarimana, the Cabinet, the Rwandan Patriotic Front, and the international community.

- The commission urged the president to "forcefully and unequivocally" speak out for peace and human rights in Rwanda and to "clearly and firmly condemn all incitation to hatred and violence between Hutu and Tutsi."
- The Cabinet was recommended to "hold accountable all officials guilty of human rights abuses" and to "instruct public prosecutors to pursue the investigations begun by the International Commission."
- The RPF was urged to "take all necessary measures" to prevent ad avoid summary executions, forced removal of populations, and attacks on civilian targets, along with holding accountable those responsible for previous violations.
- Finally, the commission called on the international community to "halt all military assistance and intervention on behalf of both the belligerents" and to "make future development aid conditional upon substantial improvement in human rights." They further insisted that the international community "continue to raise the question of human rights in Rwanda before the competent international bodies."

== Response and criticism ==
=== Rwanda ===
Upon the release of the official report, Habyarimana and his government denoted the report as a biased document that had been influenced by opposition political parties who he believed were working through Rwandan human rights organizations. In the weeks following, the Rwandan government launched a publicity campaign to highlight the specific abuses by the RPF. In response, the rebel group extended an invitation to the commission to return to the country to further investigate the allegations of the Rwandan government. A second visit was being considered before violence escalated in April 1994.

Despite an initial unwillingness to admit of wrongdoings in his country, Habyarimana later released a joint statement with his prime minister acknowledging that human rights violations had occurred. The statement recognized the three massacres that the inquiry investigated and laid their responsibility with undisciplined military officers. The statement did not claim any systematic or governmental responsibility. The Rwandan government committed itself to several of the recommendations that had been put forth in the commission's final report, including a commitment to ensure the upholding of human rights in Rwanda regardless of ethnicity or political affiliation, promotion of national reconciliation, and a guarantee to carry out all aspects of the Arusha Accords.

On April 6, 1994, Habyarimana, along with the Burundian president, were killed when their airplane was shot with a missile near Kigali; both the RPF and Hutu extremists were blamed for the attack. The assault intensified ethnic violence and acted as an impetus for the Rwandan genocide, which claimed the lives of up to 800,000 Rwandans.

=== Internationally ===
In Europe, the initial 200,000 printed copies of the report were fully distributed within a week. Two hours after its release, Belgium recalled its ambassador to Rwanda for consultations and, within two weeks, requested the recommendations of the commission's co-chair concerning the Belgium's policy towards Rwanda. France, which had been militarily involved in Rwanda, began to withdraw its troops from Rwandan soil in response to a ceasefire agreement, two days after the report was released. The European Parliament passed a resolution condemning the abuses mentioned in the report and called on both the Rwandan government and the RPF to end the violations. Reacting to the report, the United States government also condemned the offences and altered a $19.6 million aid package that was to be delivered to Rwanda, increasing the capital designated for humanitarian aid while decreasing the funding for economic development assistance. American funding to train six Rwandan military officers remained untouched.

In preparing for an official visit on behalf of the United Nations Human Rights Commission (UNHRC), the report was used by Special Rapporteur Bacre Waly Ndiaye because of "its methodical and specific nature and the diversity and consistency of the testimony it contains." In the final report, presented to the UNHRC, Ndiaye concluded that "the substance of the allegations contained in the Commission’s report could, by and large, be regarded as established."
