= Commission of Truth and Reconciliation (Yugoslavia) =

The Commission for Truth and Reconciliation in Yugoslavia was created in March 2001 through a mandate from President Vojislav Kostunica. The Commission was given a time limit of three years to complete its work and submit a report. Kostunica ordered the Commission to outline its own terms as far as the scope of the mandate. The Commission was eventually tasked with investigating the causes of conflicts in the territories of the Former Federal Republic of Yugoslavia. In February 2002, nearly a year after it was announced, the Commission began its work. During the years specified in the Commission's mandate (2001-2004), former President Slobodan Milosevic was standing trial before the International Criminal Tribunal for the Former Yugoslavia (ICTY) on charges of war crimes, crimes against humanity, and genocide. The Commission had planned to fully cooperate with the ICTY and briefly entertained the idea of holding regional hearings throughout the former republic to gather evidence. In early 2003, Yugoslavia formally dissolved and became Serbia and Montenegro. This effectively ended the Commission as it relied on a mandate from the president of Yugoslavia, an office that no longer existed. As far as it is known, the Commission never conducted any interviews, held any hearings, or filed any reports.

== Background ==
The “Yugoslav idea” developed out of a desire expressed by Serbs and Croats to be independent from the former Ottoman and Austro-Hungarian Empires. Following World War I, Yugoslavia was created from the remains of these empires. However, there would be a number of reconstructions of the land until World War II. In 1945, the Federal Republic of Yugoslavia was officially established. The population of Yugoslavia was made up of two main ethnic groups. The Narodi included Croatians, Serbs, Macedonians, and Montenegrins. The Narodnosti were Albanians, Hungarians, Turks, and Slovenians. Originally, these groups lived relatively harmoniously. It was only in recent decades that major conflicts erupted. There have been four notable ethnically based conflicts in Yugoslavia: Serbs and Croats, Serbs and Muslims, Serbs and the multiethnic population of Sarajevo, and Muslims and Croats. Similarly, recent Yugoslavian history is marked by three main conflicts: war in Slovenia in 1991, war in Croatia in 1991, and war in Bosnia-Herzegovina in 1992.

During the years of the Kosovo Conflict (1998–99), Yugoslavia saw a dramatic increase in anti-Serb propaganda which caused Serbs to react violently towards other ethnic groups, mostly Albanians. Yugoslavian President Slobodan Milošević, a Serb himself, attempted to re-write the historical narrative by countering with his own propaganda to make the Serbs look like victims. The violence between Serbs and Albanians created what Milošević referred to as the "Kosovo problem". He believed that, although Albanians had the right to self-determination, they did not have a right to independence. The Kosovo region was historically and culturally significant to Serbs and needed to remain a part of Yugoslavia.

On May 24, 1999 Milošević was indicted on charges of war crimes and crimes against humanity by the ICTY. However, he would stay in power until October 2000 when he lost the presidential election to Kostunica. On April 1, 2001 Yugoslavian authorities arrested Milošević on charges of corruption and abuse of power. After a lengthy debate in the government, he was extradited to The Hague in July. Kostunica denounced the extradition, saying that it violated a policy in the Yugoslavian constitution which prohibited the extradition of criminals to other countries. The government maintained that because the UN is not a country, the policy does not apply.

The formation of the Commission was formally announced by Kostunica in March 2001. It began its work in February 2002, nearly a year later. The Commission ended in early 2003, a year short of its mandated time limit. Since the Commission required a mandate from the president of Yugoslavia (a position that did not exist after the disbanding of Yugoslavia), the work could not be continued.

== Mandate ==
Despite the fact the Kostunica authorized the Commission, he allowed the commissioners to outline their own terms. His only stipulation was that the Commission would have three years to conduct its work and submit a final report. Eventually the Commission was tasked with investigating the "causes and the course of events of all conflicts in the territory of the former Yugoslavia." The Commission was state funded, but it also accepted private donations, though little funding came from outside the government. Although the funding came from the government, the Commission was in charge of determining how the budget would be spent. There was also a permanent staff that would work for the Commission. However, by August 2001, no funding or staff had been put in place yet. The staff positions were eventually filled with much of the staff being on loan from Kostunica's office. Two staff members resigned from their posts shortly after the Commission's work began in 2002. The Commission stated that it would work in full compliance with the ICTY and raised the idea of holding regional hearings across the former republic.

== Criticism ==
Due to the premature end of the Commission, a formal report was never submitted. No hearings were ever held nor were any interviews ever conducted. The Commission faced much criticism from both domestic and international sources. Some Yugoslavian citizens pushed for more diversity in the Commission's staff. They felt that the commissioners were too close to Kostunica and thus their judgement was being influenced. It was clear that neither the Commission nor the government had any inclination to conduct a real investigation. Others worried that the Commission was trying to re-write history rather uncover the truth. International critics felt that the mandate needed to be clarified and streamlined. They also remarked on the fact that three years is an unusually long time for a truth commission to last.
