= Pablo de Greiff =

Colombian human rights activist

- Born: United States
- Citizenship: Colombia; USA
- Education: Yale University (BA); Northwestern University (PhD)
- Occupations: Political activist, university teacher, politician
- Known for: Inaugural holder, United Nations Special Rapporteur on the Promotion of Truth, Justice, Reparation and Guarantees of non-Recurrence; International Advisory Board member, International Journal of Transitional Justice; Honorary Council member, ICTJ
- Works: Transitional Justice Program and the Prevention Project, School of Law, New York University, 2014–pres.
- Office: Member, Independent International Commission of Inquiry on Ukraine, 2022–present

Pablo de Greiff (born June 20, 1963) is a Colombian academic and human rights activist, who served as the first United Nations Special Rapporteur on the promotion of truth, justice, reparation and guarantees of non-recurrence.

In January 2015 he was also asked to be part of UNIIB, a United Nations mission of Independent Experts to address the situation in Burundi. From 2019 to 2020 he was part of a group of experts advising the UN Human Rights Council on its preventive functions. In April 2022 he was appointed as one of the three commissioners in the Independent International Commission of Inquiry on Ukraine established by the UNHRC. Since 2014 he is a Senior Fellow at the Center for Human Rights and Global Justice of the School of Law at New York University, where he directs both the Transitional Justice Program and the Prevention Project.

== Early life and education ==
Born in Bogotá on 20 June 1963, de Greiff graduated from Yale University in 1986, and completed his PhD at Northwestern University in 1993.

== Career ==
De Greiff was assistant professor of philosophy in the State University of New York from 1992 to 2002, and associate professor there in 2000–2003. He was a Laurance S. Rockefeller Visiting Faculty Fellow at the Center for Human Values, Princeton University, in 2000–2001. In 2001 he joined the International Center for Transitional Justice (ICTJ), a human rights INGO based in New York City, becoming its director of research.

While at the ICTJ de Greiff provided advice on transitional justice to the World Bank, other UN agencies, governments, truth and reconciliation commissions and other bodies, including the National Reparations Commission (Comisión Nacional de Resarcimiento) in Guatemala, the Colombian National Commission for Reparation and Reconciliation (Comisión Nacional de Reparación y Reconciliación), the Equity and Reconciliation Commission in Morocco and the Truth and Reconciliation Commission (Peru). He has also worked in the Philippines and Palestine, and has prepared for the UN Office of the High Commissioner for Human Rights (OHCHR) Rule of Law Tools for Post-Conflict States on Reparations Programmes, as well as advising OHCHR projects on reparations, Disarmament, Demobilization and Reintegration, and economic, social and cultural rights in post-conflict situations. He is widely considered as one of the intellectual shapers of the field of transitional justice.

In 2011 the UN Human Rights Council established a mandate for a Special Rapporteur on the promotion of truth, justice, reparation and guarantee of non-recurrence. De Greiff was one of 15 applicants for the three-year part-time post, and was one of three shortlisted. De Greiff's selection was announced at the conclusion of the 19th HRC session on 23 March 2012. As Special Rapporteur he presented thematic reports to the Human Rights Council and to the General Assembly. Additionally, he presented country visit reports on Tunisia, Spain, Uruguay, Burundi and the United Kingdom (specifically on Northern Ireland), and Sri Lanka. (Note: Reports are available at http://www.ohchr.org/EN/Issues/TruthJusticeReparation/Pages/Index.aspx) He also benefited from the support of the New York University which received to this end a grant from the Open Society Foundations.

De Greiff has lectured at Yale, Harvard, Columbia, Cornell, NYU, the European University Institute and other universities across Europe and Latin America. He has edited 10 books on justice and human rights and many articles on transitions to democracy, democratic theory, and the relationship between morality, politics, and law. A member of the board of editors of the International Journal of Transitional Justice, he holds dual Colombian and US citizenship.

== Other activities ==
- International Center for Transitional Justice (ICTJ), member of the advisory board
- As of 2018, Open Society Foundations (OSF), Open Society Justice Initiative, Advisory Board Chair
