= Right to truth =

Right for victims to know what happened

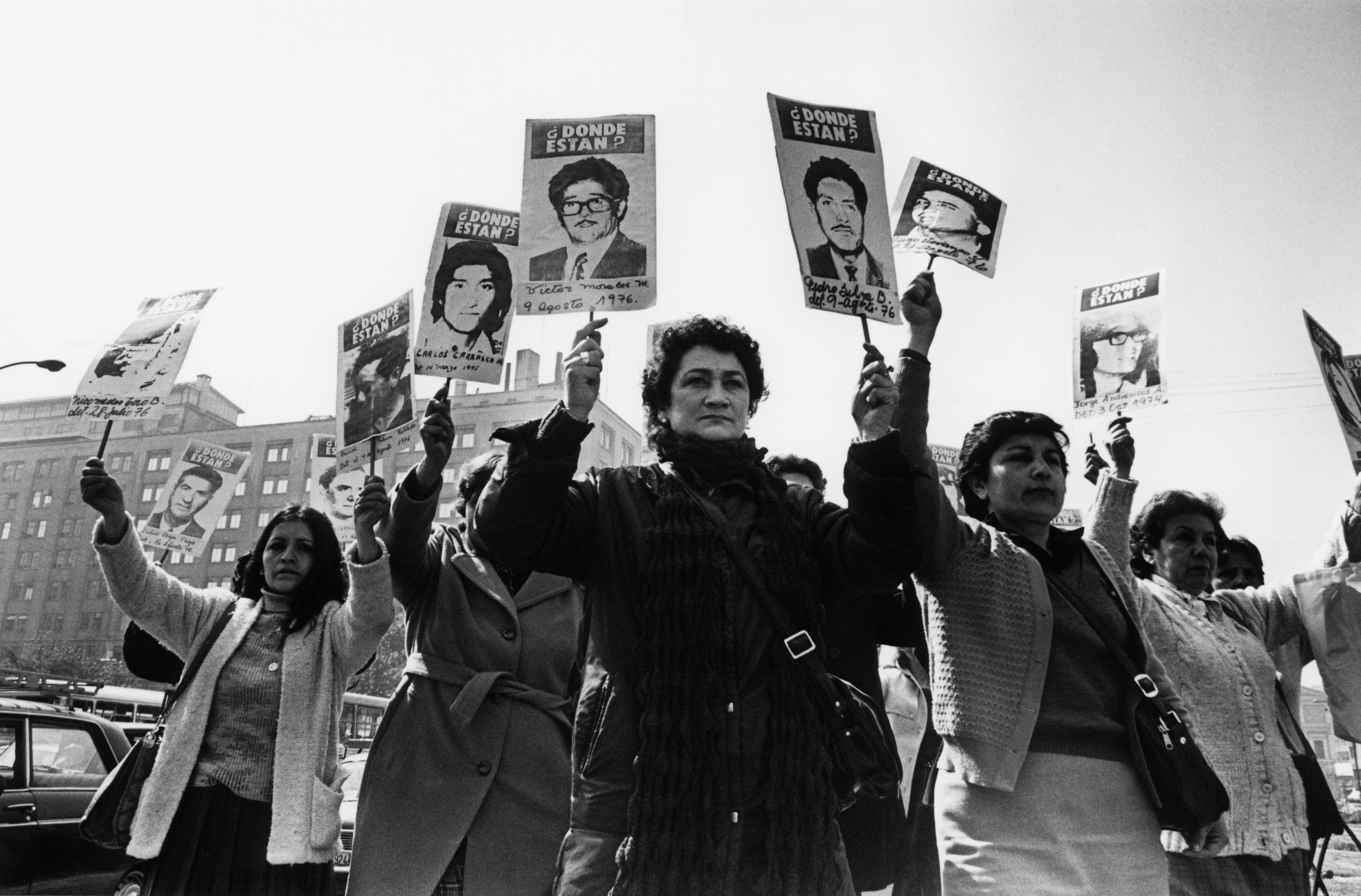
Women of the Association of Families of the Detained-Disappeared demonstrate in front of La Moneda Palace during the Pinochet military regime, demanding information on loved ones subjected to forced disappearance.

Right to truth is the right, in the case of grave violations of human rights, for the victims and their families or societies to have access to the truth of what happened. The right to truth is closely related to, but distinct from, the state obligation to investigate and prosecute serious state violations of human rights. Right to truth is a form of victims' rights; it is especially relevant to transitional justice in dealing with past abuses of human rights. In 2006, Yasmin Naqvi concluded that the right to truth "stands somewhere on the threshold of a legal norm and a narrative device ... somewhere above a good argument and somewhere below a clear legal rule".

== Origins ==
The idea of a legal right to truth is distinct from the pre-existing understanding of the importance of establishing the truth about what happened in a case of human rights violation. In 1977, Protocol I to the Geneva Conventions enshrined a right for families of people killed in armed conflicts to find out what happened to their relatives. A 1993 conference at the Catholic Institute for International Relations addressed the right to truth. The right to truth has been recognized in international soft law instruments such as the United Nations Principles to Combat Impunity (2005) and UN General Assembly Resolution 60/147, as well as by the 2011 appointment of a United Nations Special Rapporteur on the Promotion of Truth, Justice, Reparation and Guarantees of non-Recurrence. In 2006, the United Nations Human Rights Commission determined that there was an "inalienable and autonomous right" to truth. The International Convention for the Protection of All Persons from Enforced Disappearance also guarantees victims of forced disappearance a right to know the circumstances of the disappearance, but it is not universally ratified.

According to Patricia Naftali, the right to truth remains elusive because it is a concept with different definitions (sometimes contradictory), which is deployed in support of a variety of human rights claims.

== Cases ==
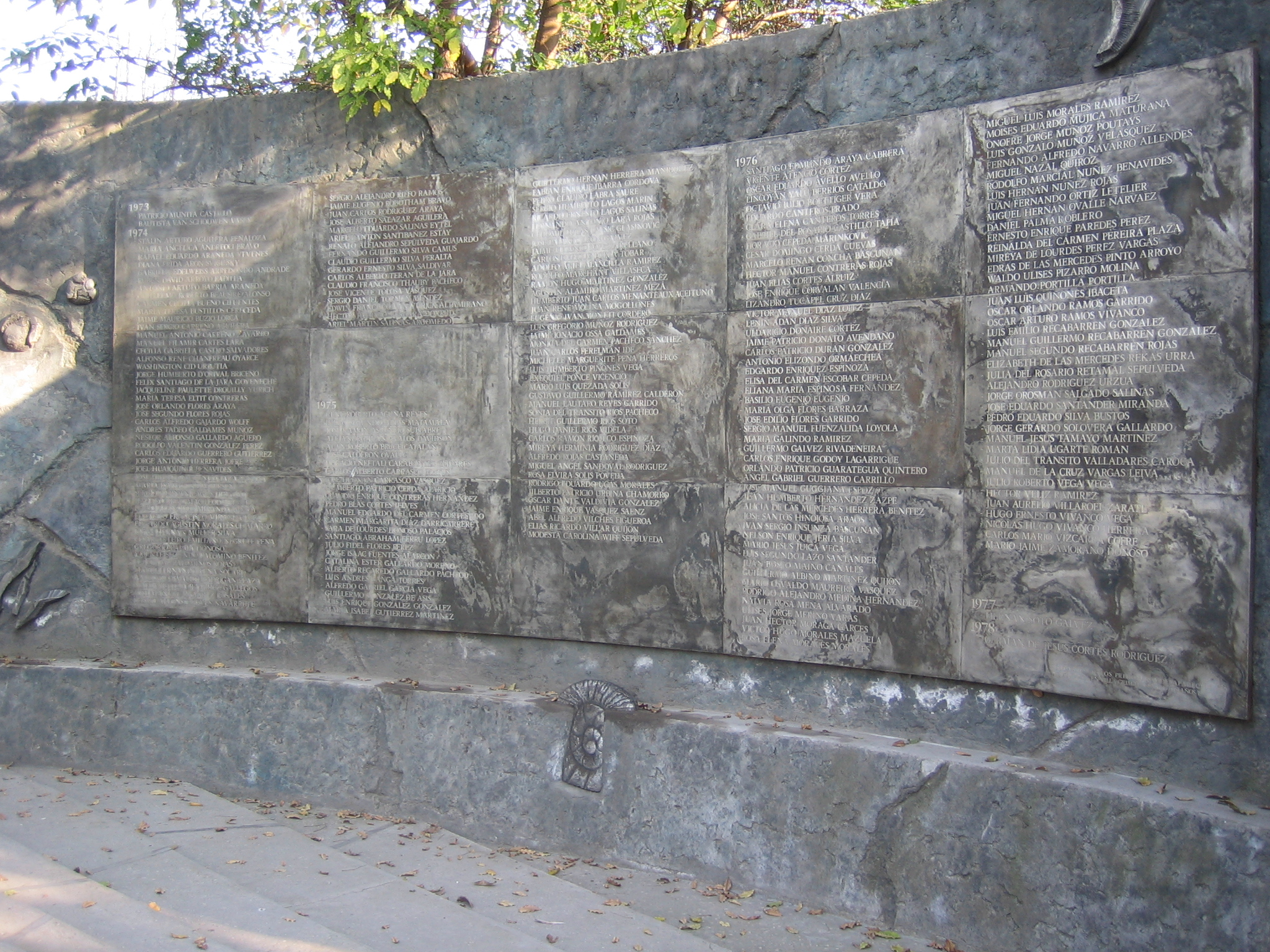
Memorial at Villa Grimaldi with the names of hundreds of people either missing from or killed there by Chilean secret police under the Pinochet dictatorship

As a result of cases before international courts that find states in breach of human rights, states have been required to:

1. Conduct effective investigations and prosecute the responsible individuals
2. Reveal information regarding missing persons
3. Publicly apologize and acknowledge the violation of human rights
4. Publish the court judgement
5. Compensate victims
6. Reimburse court costs of claimants
7. Improve security to allow the return of displaced persons
8. Take steps to avert re-occurrence of the violation
9. Change national laws
10. Institute measures to improve compliance with international human rights instruments
11. Construct memorials to commemorate the human rights violation

=== United Nations Human Rights Committee ===
The first case that articulated a right to truth in international human rights jurisprudence was a forced disappearance case, Quinteros v. Uruguay (1983); the UN Human Rights Committee determined that, according to the International Covenant on Civil and Political Rights, the mother of the victim had "the right to know what has happened to her daughter. In these respects, she too is a victim of the violations of the Covenant suffered by her daughter in particular, of article 7 [ICCPR]". In Saadoun v. Algeria (2003), regarding a man who was forcibly disappeared during the Algerian Civil War, the Committee determined that failure to investigate gave rise to a new violation of the ICCPR. In this case, Algeria had proclaimed an amnesty for crimes committed during the "national tragedy".

=== Inter-American Court of Human Rights ===
Case law of the Inter-American Court of Human Rights has tended towards an autonomous right to truth. Because of right to truth, the IACHR has invalidated agreements that grant amnesty to human rights violators, as in Barrios Altos v. Perú (2001). In 1985, six years before Guatemala accepted the jurisdiction of the IACHR, American journalist Nicholas Blake disappeared. In Blake v. Guatemala (1998), the IACHR determined that Guatemalan efforts to obstruct his family's search for the truth constituted inhuman treatment contrary to the American Convention on Human Rights.

The IACHR has often repeated its opinion:

the right to the truth is subsumed in the right of the victim or his next of kin to obtain clarification of the facts relating to the violations and the corresponding responsibilities from the competent State organs, through the investigation and prosecution established in Articles 8 and 25 of the Convention.

=== European Court of Human Rights ===
There is also case law of the European Court of Human Rights relevant to right to truth. In Cyprus v. Turkey (2001), the ECtHR ruled against Turkey in the case of Greek Cypriots who had been last seen in the custody of Turkish troops. The anguish of surviving relatives constituted a "continuing violation of Article 3 of the European Convention on Human Rights (ECHR) with respect to the relatives of the Greek-Cypriot missing persons." In El-Masri v. Macedonia (2012), the ECtHR established that North Macedonia had violated the Convention in allowing El-Masri to be taken into US custody during extraordinary rendition. The court noted that Macedonian authorities had "deprived the applicant of being informed of what had happened, including of getting an accurate account of the suffering he had allegedly endured and the role of those responsible for his alleged ordeal" as well as hidden this information from the public at large. According to law professor Arianna Vedaschi, "the decision given in El-Masri showed innovative legal reasoning and a wholly innovative attitude of the judges towards the far-reaching enforcement of the right to the truth". In Janowiec and Others v. Russia (2013), the court found no violation of the convention regarding Russian investigations into the 1940 Katyn massacre, but this ruling was on the principle of non-retroactivity because the massacre happened before the ECHR was drafted.

Legal scholar James A. Sweeney criticized the ECtHR's approach to right-to-truth cases:

the ECtHR’s 'underlying values' test could have led the way in promoting internationally the notion that present-day denial or obstruction of the quest for truth about the gravest pre-ratification human rights abuses may amount, in itself, to a contemporary human rights violation. Such an approach does not apply each human rights treaty retroactively, nor does it convert every historical human rights abuse into a 'continuing violation', but it establishes exceptional circumstances in which denying the right to truth about historical human rights abuses is constitutive of a fresh violation within the temporal jurisdiction of the relevant enforcement body.

=== National law ===
Argentine law recognizes the right to truth, with a sui generis legal proceeding called juicio por la verdad (trial for the truth) developed in the aftermath of the National Reorganization Process.

=== Potential forums ===
It has been suggested that victims might rely on Article 5 of the African Charter on Human and Peoples' Rights in right-to-truth cases before the African Court on Human and Peoples' Rights. The International Criminal Court's victim-centered approach may prove conducive to a right to truth.

== Other examples ==
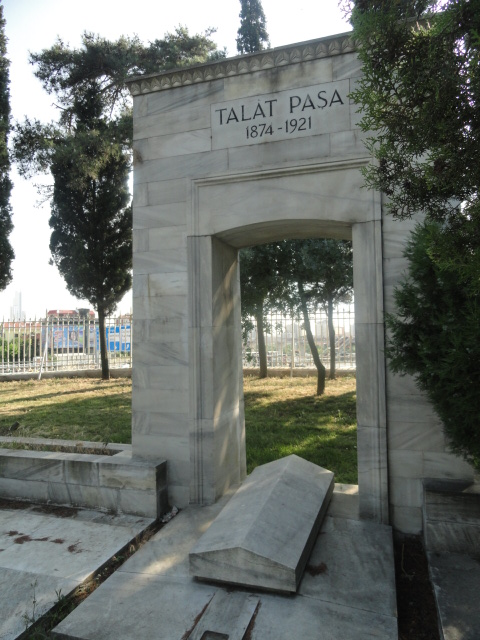
Talaat Pasha, the architect of the Armenian Genocide, was buried in 1943 at the Monument of Liberty, Istanbul as a national hero.

According to legal scholar Agostina Latino, the right to truth related to the Armenian genocide extends beyond Armenian genocide survivors to their descendants as well as Armenians at large. Latino states that, as the successor to the Ottoman government that committed the genocide, the Turkish government's ongoing Armenian genocide denial violates their right to truth. For example, there are monuments and streets named after the perpetrators, but not the victims.

The Inter-American Court and some theorists have suggested that truth-telling may be a form of partial reparations to victims of human rights abuses. Right to truth is related to the fight against impunity as establishing the truth about a past event is the first step in holding perpetrators accountable.

== Right to Truth Day ==
Since 2010, the UN has commemorated International Day for the Right to the Truth Concerning Gross Human Rights Violations and for the Dignity of Victims, or Right to Truth Day, on 24 March, the anniversary of the murder of El Salvador archbishop Óscar Arnulfo Romero.

== See also ==
- Truth commission
