= United Nations Special Rapporteur on the Promotion of Truth, Justice, Reparation and Guarantees of non-Recurrence =

United Nations Special Rapporteur

United Nations Special Rapporteur on the Promotion of Truth, Justice, Reparation and Guarantees of Non-Recurrence
- Emblem of the United Nations
- Incumbent; Mr. Bernard Duhaime since May 2024
- Inaugural holder: Mr. Pablo de Greiff
- Website: www.ohchr.org/en/issues/truthjusticereparation/pages/index.aspx

The United Nations Special Rapporteur on the Promotion of Truth, Justice, Reparation and Guarantees of Non-Recurrence works independently to inform and advise the United Nations Human Rights Council on the promotion of human rights-compliant approaches to transitional justice.

The position was created by Human Rights Council resolution 18/7 of 29 September 2011, which called for a victim-centred and gender-sensitive approach. The special rapporteur, serving a three-year term renewable once (and expected to work as SR for at least three months per year), reports to the Council and the General Assembly on normative frameworks, country situations and practices related to transitional justice mechanisms, making recommendations for the protection of human rights in post-conflict situations. These recommendations, dealing with such matters as truth-seeking, reparations and avoidance of impunity, are targeted primarily at governments and other United Nations bodies. The Special Rapporteur will also recommend strategies to address serious crimes and human rights breaches.

The first special rapporteur, Pablo de Greiff, was appointed at the conclusion of the 19th HRC session on 23 March 2012. A Colombian, he is based at the International Center for Transitional Justice in New York. From 2018 to 2024 the Special Rapporteur was the Argentinian lawyer Fabián Salvioli. In 2024, the current Special Rapporteur Bernard Duhaime was appointed. A Professor of International Law at the Université de Montréal, he previously served as a Member of the United Nations Working group on enforced or involuntary disappearances.
