= Ahmed Bello Issoufou =

Nigerien Human rights defender

- Born: Niger
- Occupations: Civil society activist, political activist, human rights defender
- Organization: Tournons La Page ("Let's Turn the Page")
- Known for: Member of the Niger branch of Tournons La Page ("Let's Turn the Page")
- Notable work: Civic protests, political mobilization, advocacy for citizens’ rights

Ahmed Bello Issoufou is a human rights defender from Niger. He is a member of the Niger branch of Tournons La Page ("Let's Turn the Page"), a civil society movement that promotes civil and political rights and campaigns against corruption and poor governance.

== Career and activism ==
Issoufou works to protect civil and political freedoms in Niger and to encourage accountable governance. He has spoken out against impunity and corruption, and has taken part in campaigns and activities calling for transparency and respect for human rights.

=== Arrest in 2022 ===
On 10 March 2022, Issoufou was detained after being called in by the judicial police. The arrest followed a complaint of defamation made by a security officer in Filingue. The complaint was linked to a social media post in which Issoufou criticised the release of a teacher accused of sexual violence.
