= Sexual violence in the Russian invasion of Ukraine =

Sexual violence related to the Russian invasion of Ukraine

- Part of Russo-Ukrainian War
Date	February 24, 2022 – present
Location	Ukraine
Result	Ongoing

Sexual violence in the 2022 Russian invasion of Ukraine has been committed by Armed Forces of Russia, including the use of mass rape as a weapon of war. According to the Independent International Commission of Inquiry on Ukraine, the victims of sexual assault by Russian soldiers ranged from 4 years old to over 80 years old.

The United Nations Human Rights High Commissioner issued a report on human rights violations and war crimes in October 2022; in the opening summary section, it stated, "Furthermore, the Commission documented patterns of summary executions, unlawful confinement, torture, ill-treatment, and rape and other sexual violence committed in areas occupied by Russian armed forces across the four provinces on which it focused. People have been detained, some have been unlawfully deported to the Russian Federation, and many are still reported missing. Sexual violence has affected victims of all ages. Victims, including children, were sometimes forced to witness the crimes. Children have become the victims of the full spectrum of violations investigated by the Commission, including indiscriminate attacks, torture and rape, and have suffered the predictable psychological consequences."

== Nature and extent of sexual violence ==
In its report covering the initial period of the Russian invasion of Ukraine, from 24 February to 26 March 2022, the Office of the United Nations High Commissioner for Human Rights (OHCHR) listed four types of risks of sexual violence: increased military presence and activities in civilian areas, the destruction of homes and infrastructure, internal displacement, and high numbers of women and girls leaving Ukraine caused high risks of conflict-related sexual violence and human trafficking. OHCHR stated that reports to a national telephone hotline service indicated a high risk of sexual violence, and that several factors made under-reporting likely.

Following the late March liberation of the Kyiv region and reports of gang rape, gunpoint sexual assaults, and rapes in front of children, The Guardian said that Ukrainian women were facing a threat of rape as a weapon of war. As of May 2022, about 82.4% of cases of sexual violence related to the conflict that were reported by the United Nations were alleged to have been perpetrated by Russian or Russian-aligned combatants, while about 9.25% were reported to have been committed by the Ukrainian Armed Forces or law enforcement. On 29 June 2022, the OHCHR reported that it had received 108 allegations of conflict related sexual violence and it had verified 23 cases. On 2 December 2022, the OHCHR reported that it had documented 86 cases of conflict-related sexual violence, including rape, gang rape, forced nudity and forced public stripping, most of which were perpetrated by members of the Russian armed forces or police authorities. The OHCHR also reported that Ukrainian law enforcement authorities were investigating 43 cases of sexual violence.

=== Sexual violence as a weapon of war ===
Organization for Security and Co-operation in Europe released a statement on 19 June 2022 condemning the use of sexual violence as a weapon of war. Secretary General Helga Maria Schmid "called for an urgent end to the use of rape and other sexual crimes as a tactic of war in Ukraine". They highlighted the need for continued investigation, the prosecution of sexual violence during the war, and called on the international community to provide assistance to the survivors. In November 2022 the OSCE participated in the 16 Days of Activism against Gender-based Violence and called for "an end to the use of rape, sexual violence and other sexual crimes as a tactic of war in Ukraine".

UN envoy Pramila Patten, the Special Representative of the Secretary-General on Sexual Violence in Conflict, stated "When women are held for days and raped, when you start to rape little boys and men, when you see a series of genital mutilations, when you hear women testify about Russian soldiers equipped with Viagra, it's clearly a military strategy." They stated that the cases currently reported are the "tip of the iceberg". Ukraine's prosecutor general commented that acts of sexual violence is massively under reported due to the difficulty investigators faced in Russian occupied areas and the fear and shame experienced by survivors, "To investigate sexual crimes on the occupied territory, when we are still in the military conflict, is very hard," said Ukraine's prosecutor general, Iryna Venediktova. "It's very difficult, because the victims are actually scared."

=== Extent of sexual violence ===
Reports of sexual violence against women, men, and children have been widespread in areas liberated from Russian occupation. Evidence of mass acts of sexual violence began to be uncovered early in the conflict; Information regarding sexual violence by Russian soldiers in occupied areas have been steadily accumulating, allowing prosecutors to begin criminal proceeding and providing additional information for investigations. Ukraine's prosecutor generals office stated they are documenting acts of sexual violence against civilians in all areas occupied by Russian soldiers; evidence shows that acts of sexual violence were committed against men and children in addition to women.

The United Nations, the Organization for Security and Co-operation in Europe, and humanitarian organisations have all confirmed the widespread use of sexual violence by Russian soldiers in Ukraine. The United Nations reported in January 2023, that the UN High Commissioner for Human Rights had documented over 90 cases of sexual violence in Russian occupied areas.

The New York Times reported "widespread evidence of sexual violence by Russian troops documented by Ukrainian and international investigators"; Anna Sosonska, an investigator in Ukraine's prosecutor general's office stated, "We are finding this problem of sexual violence in every place that Russia occupied. ... Every place: Kyiv region, Chernihiv region, Kharkiv region, Donetsk region and also here in Kherson region." The BBC reported on additional evidence of widespread sexual violence in the Kyiv region.

=== Communications intercepts ===
Since the beginning of the invasion, the Ukrainian Security Service has been monitoring and releasing communications, mainly phone calls, made by Russian soldiers and officials. Many of these communications have included comments regarding sexual violence.

Ukrainska Pravda reported an intercepted telephone conversation where a Russian soldier recounts their experience with sexual violence in Ukraine and its widespread nature;

"When we surrendered Lyman, we slaughtered everyone out there, f**king khokhols [a derogatory Russian term for Ukrainians]. ... We raped them, slaughtered them, shot them. In Lyman and Torske, we just walked around shooting everyone. All the men who were younger were taken to us out there, and the women, young ones: they were all f**ked, slaughtered, shot."

Security services of Ukraine released an intercepted phone call from a Russian soldier stating, "Locals hate us all here. Ours [Russian soldiers] rape local women". The Toronto Sun reported 14 April 2022 on an intercepted phone call where "A Russian wife laid down two ground rules after giving her soldier husband permission to rape women during the invasion of Ukraine"; "Rape them, yeah, ... Don't tell me anything, understand? Yeah, I allow you—just use protection." Ukrainian authorities issued an arrest warrant for the woman in the call, Olga Bykovskaya, on charges of violating the Geneva Conventions.

=== Sexual violence during refugee crisis ===
There have been at least two separate cases of women and children refugees who were allegedly taken advantage of while they were fleeing the violence in Ukraine. A man was arrested in Poland in mid-March for the alleged rape of a 19-year-old refugee who reportedly had sought shelter and aid from the man and two men reportedly assaulted a Ukrainian teenage refugee who was staying in German accommodations for refugees. Prior to the launch of the United Kingdom Government's housing scheme for refugees, one woman reported a man who attempted to have her stay with him and promised free accommodation, food, expenses and a monthly allowance in return for sex. The woman reportedly tried to rebuff the man, who only stopped after she informed him she was travelling with her mother.

=== Children and elderly ===
The United Nations has found that victims of sexual violence in Ukraine include children as young as 4 and adults older than 80.

In late September 2022, a panel of investigators from the Independent International Commission of Inquiry on Ukraine released a statement which said that the commission has "documented cases in which children have been raped, tortured, and unlawfully confined" and labelled these as war crimes. The same report also referenced children being killed and injured by Russia's indiscriminate attacks as well as forced separation from family and kidnapping.

In the Kyiv region, two Russian soldiers raped an entire family, including the husband, wife and their four-year-old daughter. In regions outside of Kyiv, Russian soldiers raped an 83-year-old woman, whose disabled husband was also present in the home. In another village in the same region, Russian soldiers gang-raped a 56-year-old woman after robbing her. Later the Russians tortured and murdered her husband.

=== Reports and statements ===
- According to the Sexual Violence in Armed Conflict data set, sexual violence by Russian forces has been reported in three of seven years of conflict since 2014 in eastern Ukraine.
- In April 2022, Ukrainian officials and human rights organisations reported that Russian troops were using sexual violence on a huge scale as an instrument of war against the civilian population, to break down the morale of Ukrainians and prevent them from resisting. On 3 April, La Strada Ukraine, which runs a hotline for helping survivors of human trafficking, sexual assault and domestic violence, stated that rape is underreported and stigmatised in peacetime and that the cases known to the organisation could be "the tip of the iceberg".
- On 3 April 2022, British Ambassador to Ukraine Melinda Simmons called rape "an element of Russia's unprovoked war campaign. … Though we don't yet know the full extent of its use in Ukraine, it's already clear it was part of Russia's arsenal. … Women raped in front of their kids, girls in front of their families, as a deliberate act of subjugation."
- On 21 April 2022, the Canadian and UK foreign ministers Mélanie Joly and Liz Truss jointly signed a letter in which they said that rape was being "used as a weapon of war" by Russian soldiers in Ukraine. They described rape as a weapon of war to be "a systematic weapon to exert control and exercise power over women … as destructive in conflict as chemical weapons or landmines, which are both banned by international conventions, but yet to be treated as seriously."
- In May 2022 Ukraine's prosecutor general Iryna Venediktova said that she was sure that rape was used as a deliberate war tactic by the Russian army.
- On 19 June 2022, the Organization for Security and Co-operation in Europe released a statement condemning sexual violence in war and referenced the use of sexual violence as a weapon of war against Ukraine. It stated in part, "Today, on the International Day for the Elimination of Sexual Violence in Conflict, OSCE Secretary General Helga Maria Schmid called for an urgent end to the use of rape and other sexual crimes as a tactic of war in Ukraine and elsewhere in the OSCE region and beyond."
- On 27 September 2022 a report of the Office of the United Nations High Commissioner for Human Rights (OHCHR) said that it was not yet able to draw any conclusions on the extent of conflict-related sexual violence in Ukraine, but that it had documented "numerous cases" perpetrated against women, girls and men. OHCHR had documented 9 cases of rape, 15 cases of sexual violence used as a method of torture, and 11 cases of forced public stripping against people considered to be "lawbreakers".
- On 18 October 2022, a United Nations commission issued a report finding Russia responsible for a "pattern of rape and other abuses in Ukraine"; they found Russia was responsible for the vast majority of human rights violations and war crimes. The report was presented to the United Nations General Assembly by the Independent Commission of Inquiry on Ukraine.
- On 31 October 2022, UK Foreign Secretary James Cleverly said that Russian soldiers in Ukraine were responsible of "mass rape".
- In January 2023, Human Rights Watch issued the World Report 2023, the 33rd edition of the human rights report reviewing events during 2022. Regarding Ukraine reported it part, "In areas they occupied, Russian or Russian-affiliated forces committed apparent war crimes, including torture, summary executions, sexual violence, and enforced disappearances."
- In February the Pilecki Institute in Poland published a report on conflict-related sexual violence based on interviews with 42 women who were victims of sexual violence and 11 women who witnessed it, 22 women who were held in captivity, 11 women who were raped and 8 men who witnessed sexual violence.

== Prominent cases in the media ==
In late March, the Prosecutor General, Venediktova, started an investigation into a claim of Russian soldiers shooting a man and then raping his wife. The Times published an interview with the woman. She stated that she was from a small village in Brovary Raion. According to her testimony, when Russian soldiers arrived at the couple's house, they shot the couple's dog and then murdered her husband telling her, "You don't have a husband anymore. I shot him with this gun. He was a fascist." The woman was gang raped at gunpoint multiple times over several hours while the soldiers drank; eventually they became "so drunk they were barely standing". The woman eventually escaped with her son who had been in the home while this occurred. The alleged rapists were later identified from social media profiles. Meduza published a report about this incident and similar crimes in the Bogdanivka region. Russian spokesperson Dmitry Peskov described the allegations as "a lie". An arrest warrant was issued in the case for an identified Russian soldier based on "suspicion of violation of the laws and customs of war". The case has been verified by OHCHR and it was described in its June 2022 report on human rights in Ukraine during the Russian invasion.

Human Rights Watch (HRW) reported on a 13 March beating and rape of a 31-year-old woman in the village of Mala Rohan in Kharkiv Raion, which at the time was controlled by the Russian Armed Forces. The report stated a Russian soldier entered a school and beat and raped at gunpoint a woman sheltering with her family and other villagers.

The BBC News interviewed a 50-year-old woman from a village 70 kilometres (43 mi) west of Kyiv, who said she was raped at gunpoint by a Chechen allied with the Russian Armed Forces. According to neighbours a 40-year-old woman was raped and killed by the same soldier, leaving what the BBC News described as a "disturbing crime scene". The police chief of Kyiv Oblast, Andrii Nebytov, stated that the police were investigating a case on 9 March when Russian soldiers shot a man and repeatedly raped his wife. The soldiers pillaged and burnt the house and killed the family's dogs.

In September 2022, two fighters of the Donetsk People's Republic were allegedly raped by allied Chechen Kadyrovite soldiers in the village of Berestove. The perpetrators also allegedly threatened other service people who attempted to protect the victims. Abubakar Yangulbaev, a human rights activist, confirmed the authenticity of the related video.

The New York Times described how one woman was "held as a sex slave, naked except for a fur coat and locked in a potato cellar before being executed", found after the late March 2022 liberation of the Kyiv region. Bucha mayor Anatoliy Fedoruk stated that at least 25 rapes had been reported during Bucha massacre.

In June 2023, The Sunday Times reported on two former Ukrainian soldiers who had been tortured by Russians while in captivity and castrated with a knife, before being freed in a prisoner of war swap. A psychologist who was treating the men stated that she had heard of many other similar cases from her colleagues. The same report stated that doctors at a maternity clinic in Poltava reported cases of women who had been raped by Russian soldiers and then had window sealant injected into their sexual organs so that they could never have children.

== Responses ==
=== Protests ===
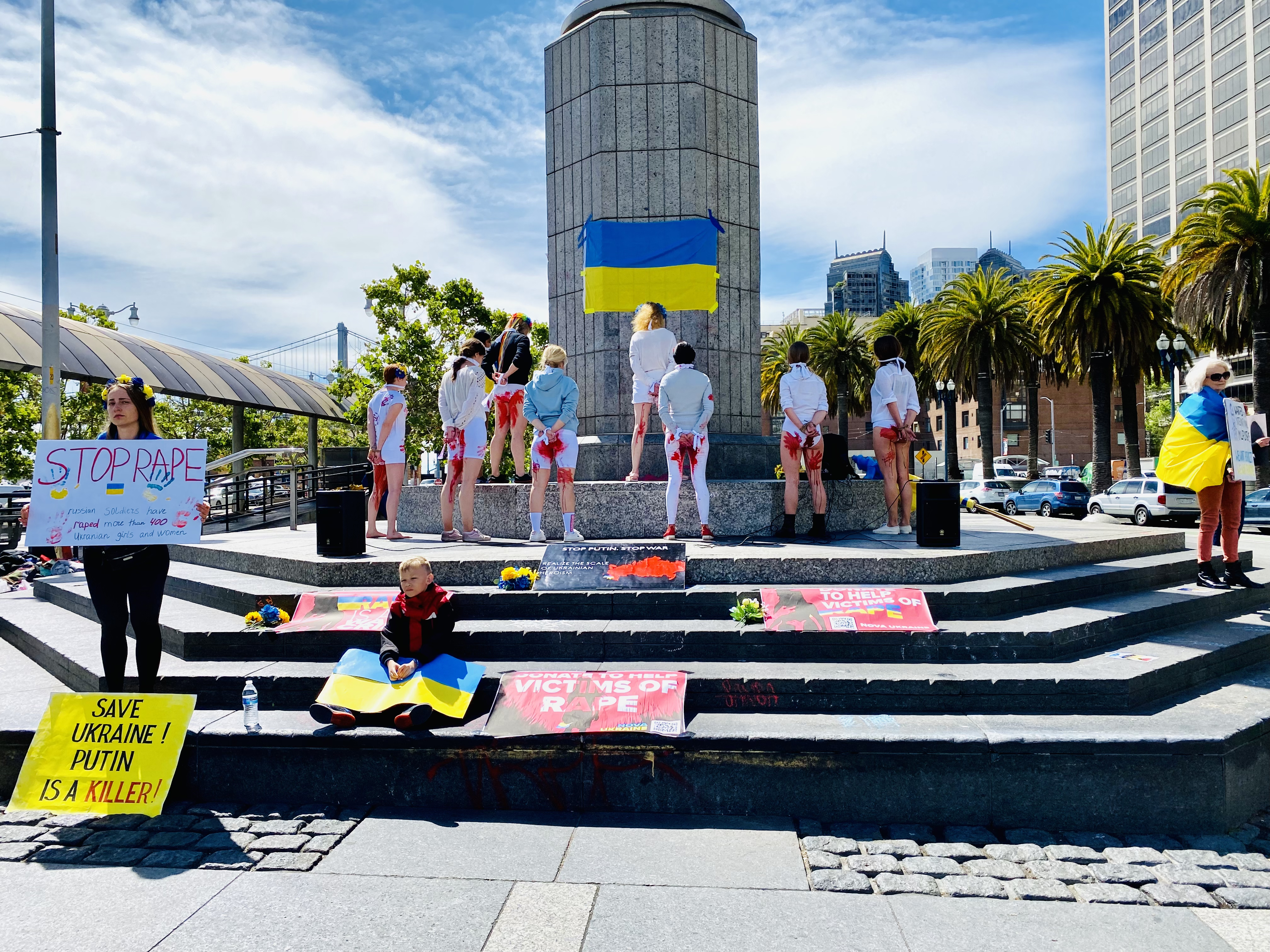
A protest against sexual violence in the invasion at San Francisco, United States. Photographed in 2022

Women held protests at Russian embassies against rape by Russian soldiers in the invasion. The women protested with bags over their heads, their hands tied behind their backs, and their bare legs covered in red liquid, symbolising blood, with four women protesting on 16 April 2022 in Dublin, Ireland, and 80 women protesting on the same day in Vilnius, Lithuania. On 20 April, a similar protest, by 130 women took place in front of the Russian embassy in Riga, Latvia, and another was held by a dozen women in front of the Russian consulate in Gdańsk, Poland.

=== Investigations ===
In August 2022, Ukraine's prosecutor general's office reported that there were "several dozen" criminal proceedings underway for sexual violence committed by Russian servicemen. As of 31 October 2022, Ukrainian authorities were reportedly investigating 43 cases of sexual violence. In November the same year two Russian soldiers were convicted of war crimes in absentia for sexual violence towards civilians.

Ukrainian Prosecutor Iryna Didenko stated in January 2023 that their office had opened 154 cases related to acts of sexual violence committed by Russian soldiers, but cautioned that the actual number of incidents is probably far higher. They stated that doctors and mental health workers had determined that in the Kyiv Oblast one in nine women had experienced sexual violence during the Russian occupation. Didenko added that Russian invaders have a clear pattern of behaviour: "Ground forces arrive, and rapes start on the second or third day".

== See also ==
- Bucha massacre
- Crimes against humanity
- Outline of the Russo-Ukrainian War
- International Criminal Court investigation in Ukraine
- Torture and castration of a Ukrainian POW in Pryvillia
- Dedovshchina
- Women in the Russian invasion of Ukraine § War crimes and violence against women
- War crimes in the Russian invasion of Ukraine
