= A. James McAdams =

International affairs professor

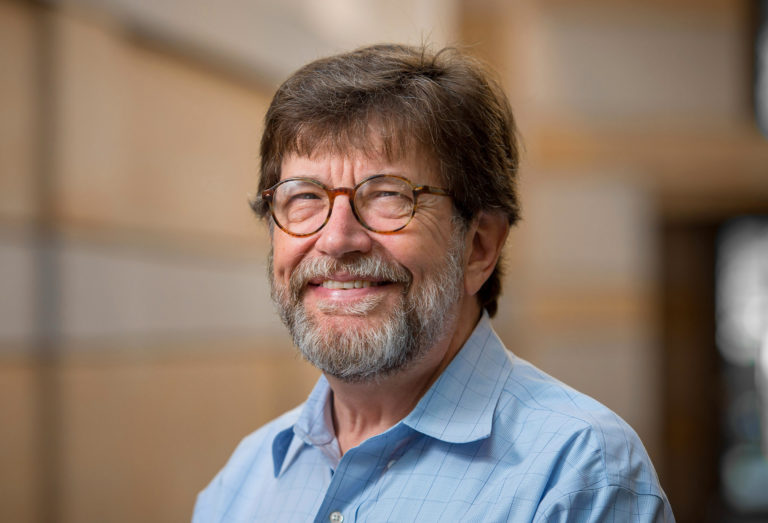
- McAdams in 2016
- Occupations: Political scientist, author and academic

Academic background
- Education: BA., Political Science; MA., Political Science; PhD., Political Science
- Alma mater: Earlham College; University of California, Berkeley
- Thesis: Surviving Detente: East German Political Character After the Wall (1983)

Academic work
- Institutions: University of Notre Dame

A. James McAdams is a political scientist, author, and academic. He is the William M. Scholl Professor of International Affairs at the University of Notre Dame.

McAdams is most known for his research on communism, democratization, transitional justice, and far-right politics. He is the author of four books, including East Germany and Détente, Germany Divided, Judging the Past in Unified Germany, and Vanguard of the Revolution, and has also co-edited books such as Global 1968 and Contemporary Far-Right Thinkers and the Future of Liberal Democracy. His contributions to the University of Notre Dame have won him several awards including the Thomas J. Madden Teaching Award and the Rev. Edmund P. Joyce Award. He also received a Gold Medal from the Catholic University of Slovakia and earned the Outstanding Mentor Award from the Kellogg Institute International Scholars Program, along with the DAAD Prize for Distinguished Scholarship in German Studies.

McAdams is an associate editor for The Review of Politics and Contributing Editor for the New Oxford Review, as well as a Member of the Academic Advisory Council for the Victims of Communism Memorial Foundation.

== Education ==
McAdams obtained his bachelor's degree in Political Science at Earlham College in 1976 and then received his M.A. (1977) and Ph.D. (1983) at the University of California, Berkeley, where he completed a dissertation titled "Surviving Détente: East German Political Character After the Wall". He has also been a recipient of the Richard Weaver Graduate Fellowship in 1976, the DAAD Fellowship in 1981, the Humboldt Research Fellowship in 1987, the MacArthur Foundation Fellowship in International Security in 1996, and he has been a fellow of the Institute for Advanced Study at the University of Konstanz, Germany from 2012 to 2013.

== Career ==
McAdams began his academic career as a visiting lecturer at the University of California, Davis, and held the position of Assistant Professor in the Department of Government at Hamilton College from 1983 to 1985. From 1985 to 1992, he was the Robert K. Root Assistant Professor of Politics at Princeton University, and joined University of Notre Dame as an associate professor of Government and International Studies in 1992. He later assumed the role of professor and has held the position of William M. Scholl Professor of International Affairs at Notre Dame since 2001.

At Notre Dame, McAdams served as chair of the Department of Government and International Studies from 1997 to 2002. Additionally, he served as the director at the Nanovic Institute for European Studies from 2002 to 2018.

== Works ==
McAdams has published books and articles on subjects related to contemporary politics and political history, including authoritarianism, democratic collapse, right-wing and left-wing extremism, transitional justice, and political change. In recent years, his research has focused on exploring the rise and fall of world communism and analyzing the threat of far-right politics to liberal democracy in Europe and the United States.

=== Germany divided: from the wall to reunification ===
McAdams' book Germany Divided offered an analysis of the forty-year relationship between East and West Germany, delving into the political, historical, and analytical factors that shaped both the divided and reunited Germany. In his review for International Affairs, Jonathan Osmond highlighted the book's focus on the policies and behavior of the German Democratic Republic (GDR) and the Federal Republic of Germany (FRG), saying that by investigating the evolving governmental attitudes in East and West Germany regarding the division of Germany the book contributes to a better understanding of the contrasting political structures of the two republics.

=== Judging the past in unified Germany ===
In 2001, McAdams explored the Federal Republic of Germany's efforts to address the legacy of dictatorship. His book Judging the Past in Unified Germany examined four key aspects: criminal trials related to the Berlin Wall killings, the disqualification of administrative personnel with secret-police ties, parliamentary truth-telling commissions, and private property restitution to look into Germany's efforts to confront its history in the wake of division and reunification. Marc Morjé Howard, in his review for the Political Science Quarterly, stated that the author has written a book that creates a new model for future studies not only about Germany but also about other countries that have, or will, pursue equitable and reconciliatory approaches to retrospective justice.

=== Vanguard of the revolution: the global Idea of the communist party ===
McAdams' publication, Vanguard of the Revolution: The Global Idea of the Communist Party, was selected as one of the Best Books of 2018 by Foreign Affairs. It provided a historical exploration of the evolution of the communist party, highlighting its revolutionary origins and its adaptation in countries like the Soviet Union, China, Cuba, and North Korea. In a feature for The Chicago Maroon, he discussed how figures like Stalin and Mao ascended to power through internal party struggles and the centralization of power within their organizations. He explained his motivation for writing the book, stating that political scientists had extensively explored party behavior in both developing and advanced democracies but had notably neglected the comparative study of communist parties. Yvonne Howell, in the Times Higher Education, described the book as a "sweeping introduction to one of the most influential and powerful political institutions that provides intellectual provocation and an inspiration to take better care of our fragile democracies". Abhishek Bhattacharyya in the Chicago Review noted the book's demonstration of the diverse nature of communism and its limitations within the author's liberal political framework stating that the book inspires reflection on the nuances of political systems and their implications for democracy.

=== Contemporary far-right thinkers and the future of liberal democracy ===
In his 2021 book, Contemporary Far-right Thinkers and the Future of Liberal Democracy, McAdams and his collaborators systematically analyzed contemporary far-right intellectuals and their potential impact on democratic politics. The book explored various ideological movements, including the European New Right, white nationalism, and antifeminism. In an interview about the book with The Illiberalism Studies Program, he noted that far-right intellectuals, while having diverse views on the ideal society, represent a different form of far-right political thinking than what scholars associate with fascism and other anti-democratic movements. Steven Pittz's review in Law & Liberty noted that the book elucidates recurring themes within far-right ideology and provides guidance on defending liberal democracy against the more illiberal aspects of far-right movements.

== Awards and honors ==
- 1989 – Robert K. Root Preceptorship, Princeton University
- 1995 – Sheedy Excellence in Teaching Award
- 1997 – DAAD Prize for Distinguished Scholarship in German Studies
- 2001 – Thomas J. Madden Teaching Award, University of Notre Dame
- 2017 – Rev. Edmund P. Joyce Award, University of Notre Dame
- 2018 – Outstanding Mentor Award, Kellogg Institute International Scholars Program
- 2018 – Doctorate honoris causa, Ukrainian Catholic University
- 2019 – Doctorate honoris causa, John Paul II Catholic University, Lublin, Poland
- 2021 – Gold Medal, Catholic University of Slovakia

== Bibliography ==
=== Selected books ===
- Germany Divided: From the Wall to Reunification (1992) ISBN 978-0691078922
- Judging the Past in Unified Germany (2001) ISBN 978-0521802086
- Vanguard of the Revolution: The Global Idea of the Communist Party (2018) ISBN 978-0691168944
- Global 1968: Cultural Revolutions in Europe and Latin America (2021) ISBN 978-0268200572
- Contemporary Far-Right Thinkers and the Future of Liberal Democracy (2021) ISBN 978-0367611613
- Far-Right Newspeak and the Future of Liberal Democracy (2024) ISBN 9781032566269

=== Selected articles ===
- McAdams, A. J. (1994). Inter-German relations in historical perspective: The risks of biased hindsight. German Politics, 3(2), 193–205.
- McAdams, A. J. (2001). Reappraising the Conditions of Transitional Justice in Unified Germany. E. Eur. Const. Rev., 10, 53.
- McAdams, A. J. (2002). What remains? The political culture of an unlucky birth. German Politics & Society, 20(2 (63), 26–42.
- McAdams, A. J. (2007). Spying on Terrorists: Germany in Comparative Perspective. German Politics & Society, 70–88.
- McAdams, A. J. (2011). Transitional justice: The issue that won't go away. International Journal of Transitional Justice, 5(2), 304–312.
