= Janowiec and Others v. Russia =

European Court of Human Rights case

Janowiec and Others v. Russia (also sometimes known as the Katyn case) was a case brought before the European Court of Human Rights in 2007 and concluded in 2013 concerning the issue of human right violations in the context of the Katyn massacre.

== Background ==
In 1940, Stalin ordered the execution of over 20,000 Polish prisoners-of-war and prison inmates in what became known as the Katyn massacre, a crime that the Soviet Union denied until 1990. The case concerned whether Russia violated the European Convention on Human Rights (ECHR) in 2004 by discontinuing the investigation and by classifying some documents, including about the reasons for the case being closed. The case was brought to the European Court of Human Rights (ECHR) by a number of victims' families, which unsuccessfully demanded access to the classified documents. The case has been described as about the right to know the fate of the family members and the right to obtain a thorough investigation into the related crime.

== Verdict ==
The case received a ruling by the ECtHR Chamber in 2012 and by its Grand Chamber in 2013. The Chamber rejected all but one of the claims of the applications (reformatio in peius), who referred the case to the Grand Chamber, which in turn concluded that it has "no competence" in the area, as the massacre occurred in 1940, before the ECHR was adopted over a decade later in 1953 and that Russia ratified only in 1998. It, however, criticised Russia for failing to provide evidence and satisfactory rationale for classification of the documents.

Four justices dissented, stating that "a failure to prosecute war crimes that would 'turn the applicants' long history of justice delayed into a permanent case of justice denied'" and that it makes ECtHR a failure as the "conscience" court of Europe that it was intended to be.

== Analysis ==
The final verdict has been criticised by a number of scholars. Gabriella Citroni called it a "denial of justice", and Yaroslav Kozheurov noted that it showed the court's "unwillingness to deal in detail with the black pages of Europe's past". Susana Sanz-Caballero noted that the ECHR had "interpreted its own competence in a very restrictive manner" and ignored its other options. Julia Koch noted that such options included international customary law, and she described the court's refusal to consider "unfortunate" and to result in the court failing to "protect the rights of the prisoners and their relatives" and holding "Russia accountable for its gross violation of human rights". William Schabas concluded that the limited temporal view of ECHR as applicable only to events that took place after it was drafted in 1950 "is questionable, [...] the reasoning behind it is dubious, and [...] the result is a regrettable confirmation of a situation of impunity".

Susana Sanz-Caballero noted that the case caused "astonishment [and] outrage" in Poland.

== See also ==
- Right to truth
