= Torture and castration of a Ukrainian prisoner of war in Pryvillia =

2022 Russo-Ukrainian War incident

Location of Pryvillia in Luhansk Oblast, in Ukraine

In July 2022, video recordings of the torture, castration and murder of a Ukrainian POW in the Pryvillia sanatorium by Russian servicemen were published online. Taking place during the 2022 Russian invasion of Ukraine, the video caused an international outcry and brought strong condemnation from a number of human rights bodies. Representatives of both Ukraine and the US noted that the event constitutes a war crime.

== Emergence of the video ==
On July 28, 2022, a video was posted on a Russian Telegram page showing a Russian soldier torturing and castrating a Ukrainian prisoner of war. The identity of the victim is unclear through the video; however, the video is shot in high-quality footage and features extreme themes of violence throughout.

In the initial stages, the victim is repeatedly stomped on, rendering him unconscious, before being mocked, restrained, bound, and gagged by a group of Russian troops. One of the Russian soldiers, who is short and stocky in figure and wears a wide-brimmed sequinned hat, reaches over the victim. Wearing blue surgical gloves and wielding a box-cutting knife, the man cuts through the victim's trousers, exposing his genitals. A proceeding scene then depicts the unconscious victim having his genitals removed, which the protagonist then appears to hold up to the camera.

On the following day, an alleged continuation video was posted in Russian channels with what appears to be the same Russian soldier and prisoner. With the victim prone and lapsing in and out of consciousness, the Russian soldiers again tape the Ukrainian prisoner's mouth with black tape and throw the severed genitals into the direction of the victim's face. The group then drag the victim via a rope connected to his legs to a small ditch, at which point the Russian soldier appears to shoot him in the head.

== Bellingcat investigation ==
On 5 August, the Bellingcat group reported that the videos were geolocated to the Pryvillia Sanatorium, located in Pryvillia, Luhansk Oblast, and interviewed the apparent perpetrator by telephone. A white car marked with a Z – a designation marking Russian military vehicles and a militarist symbol used in Russian propaganda – can also be seen in the video; the same car can also be seen in earlier, official videos released by Russian channels, of the Akhmat fighters at the Azot plant during the Russian capture of Sievierodonetsk. Pryvillia had been captured and occupied by Russians since early July.

Bellingcat and Conflict Intelligence Team identified the soldiers involved, including the main perpetrator, Ochur-Suge Mongush from Tuva, who wore a distinctive wide brimmed black hat, as members of the Akhmat unit, a Chechen Kadyrovite paramilitary formation fighting for the Russians in the war in Ukraine. The investigation also indicated that the video contained no evidence of tampering or editing.

== Reactions ==
=== In Ukraine ===
Ombudsman Dmytro Lubinets announced an application to the Office of the Prosecutor-General of Ukraine to verify a war crime according to the Geneva violation of the Geneva Conventions, and that they would ask the UN Committee Against Torture to organize an urgent visit to Russia and Russian-occupied territories of Ukraine, as well as the Council of Europe's Committee for the Prevention of Torture.

=== International ===
The EU High Representative Josep Borrell released a statement on 29 July describing the contents of the video as "appalling" and a "heinous atrocity". On the same day, Marie Struthers, Amnesty International’s Director for Eastern Europe and Central Asia, said: “This horrific assault is yet another apparent example of complete disregard for human life and dignity in Ukraine committed by Russian forces. All those suspected of criminal responsibility must be investigated and, if there is sufficient admissible evidence, prosecuted in fair trials before ordinary civilian courts and without recourse to death penalty." The United Nations Human Rights Monitoring Mission in Ukraine released a statement on Facebook saying:

"HRMMU is appalled by the latest videos, apparently showing the beating, castration and shooting of a captured soldier from the Ukrainian Armed Forces by a man, who appears to be a member of the Russian armed forces or affiliated armed groups. In one of the videos, the tortured soldier appeared to be shot in the head and his body dragged into a ditch. If confirmed, these actions would constitute war crimes."

In September 2022, the U.S. Treasury's Office of Foreign Assets Control and the U.S. Department of State simultaneously imposed sanctions and visa restrictions on Mongush.

== See also ==
- Makiivka surrender incident
- Torture of Russian soldiers in Mala Rohan
- Execution of Oleksandr Matsievskyi
- Beheading of a Ukrainian prisoner of war in summer 2022
