= Priscilla Hayner =

American human rights activist

Priscilla Hayner is an American human rights activist. She has received degrees from Earlham College and the School of International and Public Affairs at Columbia University.

She is best known for her expertise on truth commissions and transitional justice, and has focused her work on official truth-seeking measures in political transitions around the world.

Hayner has worked as a consultant at the Ford Foundation and the Office of the United Nations High Commissioner for Human Rights. She also served as a program officer for the Joyce Mertz-Gilmore Foundation, where she focused on international human rights and global security.

In 2001, she co-founded the International Center for Transitional Justice (ICTJ), an international human rights NGO. She directed this organization’s work on Sierra Leone, Peru, Ghana, and a number of other countries.

Hayner has written widely on the subject of truth-seeking. In 2001 she published the book Unspeakable Truths: Confronting State Terror and Atrocity, examining the work of over 20 truth commissions worldwide.

She has further shared her expertise on multiple broadcasts, including BBC Northern Ireland Radio, BBC World Service, NPR, SABC in South Africa, and STAR Radio and UNMIL Radio in Liberia.
