= Mala Rohan =

- Village
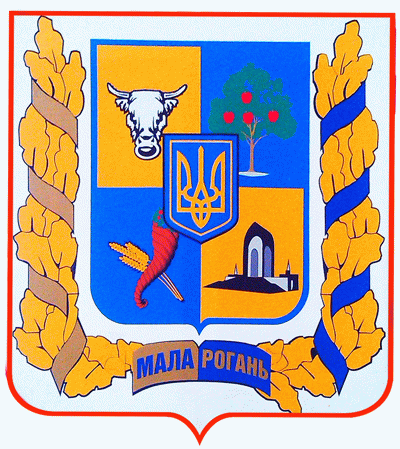
- Coat of arms

- Location within Kharkiv Oblast Location within Ukraine
- Coordinates: 49°56′19″N 36°29′26″E
- Country: Ukraine
- Oblast: Kharkiv
- Raion: Kharkiv
- Postal code: 62485
- Area code: +380 57

Mala Rohan (Ukrainian: Мала Рогань) is a village in Ukraine in Kharkiv Raion, Kharkiv Oblast. It belongs to Vilkhivka rural hromada, one of the hromadas of Ukraine.

== History ==
=== Early 21st century ===
On 7 November 2020 an Emblem of the Ukrainian Soviet Socialist Republic was dismantled from the facade of a school in Mala Rohan.

=== Russian invasion of Ukraine ===
On 25 February 2022, the village was captured by the Russian Armed Forces during the Russian invasion of Ukraine. Human Rights Watch documented at least one case of sexual violence by Russian soldiers during the occupation. It was retaken by the Armed Forces of Ukraine on 28 March 2022.

On 27 March 2022, a viral video appearing to show Ukrainian soldiers torturing Russian prisoners of war and shooting them in the legs attracted widespread attention. The BBC among others reported the geolocation of an open-source researcher on Twitter that the video was filmed at a dairy farm near Mala Rohan. Many Ukrainian sources said that the video had been staged, pointing at perceived inaccuracies in the video. The BBC said it could not verify the authenticity of the video nor Ukrainian and Russian accounts. On 29 June, the United Nations High Commissioner for Human Rights published a report in which the incident in Mala Rohan is mentioned as one of two "documented cases of summary execution and torture of Russian prisoners of war and persons hors de combat reportedly perpetrated by members of Ukrainian armed forces."
