= 119th Territorial Defense Brigade =

Ukrainian Territorial Defense Forces unit

- Ukrainian: 119-та окрема бригада територіальної оборони
- Active: 29 March 2018 - present
- Country: Ukraine
- Branch: Armed Forces of Ukraine
- Type: Military reserve force
- Role: Light infantry
- Part of: Territorial Defense Forces
- Garrison/HQ: Chernihiv Oblast; MUN А7047
- Engagements: Russo-Ukrainian war: Russian invasion of Ukraine

Commanders
- Current commander: (2024-present) Col.Elmaddin Mamedov

Insignia
- Flag

The 119th Territorial Defense Brigade (Ukrainian: 119-та окрема бригада територіальної оборони) is a military formation of the Territorial Defense Forces of Ukraine in Chernihiv Oblast. It is part of Operational Command North.

== History ==
=== Formation ===
On 29 March 2018 the brigade was formed in Chernihiv Oblast. It was the first brigade to be raised for the Territorial Forces. The need for the brigade arose from having over 40 local defense units that lacked organized support. The brigade was planned to be composed of older reservists, aged up to 55 years old.

The brigade held a yearly exercise at a training range in Honcharivske.

From 12 to 26 May 2021 a large scale exercise took place involving over 2,000 reservists of the brigade. Battalions 162, 163, 164, 167 were involved in the exercise.

On 28 January 2022 the brigade was 70% formed, with a peacetime strength of over 400 soldiers and officers and over 4,000 planned in time of war. In case of war, five of the six battalions were to be stationed in each of the raions, with one defending the city of Chernihiv.

=== Russo-Ukrainian War ===
Russian invasion of Ukraine

Units of the brigade took part in battles in Novoselivka, Shestovytsia, Yahidne, Lukashivka and near Chernihiv.

On 27 August, the brigade received its battle flag.

On 21 September, Chernihiv City Council awarded the brigade's commander, Colonel Oleksii Vysotskyi, a "Honorary citizen of the city Chernihiv" title.

In late December, Moldovan-born Oleksandr Matsievskyi, a sniper from the 163rd Battalion, was captured and executed by Russian soldiers during the battle of Bakhmut. In January 2023, the 163rd Battalion was still fighting in the Bakhmut area.

In Spring 2023, units of the brigade were patrolling border areas and destroying HESA Shahed 136 drones.

== Structure ==
As of 2022 the brigade's structure is as follows:

- Headquarters
- 162nd Territorial Defense Battalion (Sedniv) MUN А7328
- 163rd Territorial Defense Battalion (Nizhyn) MUN А7329
- 164th Territorial Defense Battalion (Pryluky) MUN А7330
- 165th Territorial Defense Battalion (Novhorod-Siverskyi) MUN А7331
- 166th Territorial Defense Battalion (Ripky) MUN А7332
- 167th Territorial Defense Battalion (Mena) MUN А7333
- Engineering Company
- Communication Company
- Logistics Company
- Mortar Battery

== Commanders ==
- Colonel Oleksii Vysotskyi 2018 - 2024

== See also ==
- Territorial Defense Forces of the Armed Forces of Ukraine
