= Makiivka surrender incident =

Event from the 2022 Russian invasion of Ukraine

Location of Makiivka in Luhansk Oblast

The Makiivka surrender incident happened during the Russian invasion of Ukraine in 2022 in the village of Makiivka, Luhansk Oblast. Videos depicted what appeared to be at least ten Russian soldiers surrendering to four Ukrainian soldiers in Makiivka. Russian soldiers exited an outhouse one by one and laid facedown on the ground. Ukrainian soldiers appeared relaxed with rifles pointed to the ground. Then an eleventh Russian soldier suddenly emerged and opened fire at the Ukrainians, catching them by surprise, a possible war crime of perfidy. In another video, there was about 12 dead visible from the footage. When the footage was taken, and who shot the footage, was unknown.

On 19 November 2022, the United Nations High Commissioner for Human Rights stated that the United Nations was aware of the videos and was looking at them. According to the spokesman of the UN Human's Rights Office, "allegations of summary executions of people hors de combat should be promptly, fully and effectively investigated, and any perpetrators held to account".

== Videos ==
The New York Times said that it had verified videos of Russian soldiers before and after they were shot, when Ukrainian soldiers tried to capture them, though it was unclear whether Ukrainian troops had acted in self-defense. In this video, the majority of the Russian soldiers are in the same positions as when they surrendered, lying immobile and obviously dead. They are surrounded by blood, and some of them look to be bleeding from the head or upper torso. The uniforms worn by the soldiers include the recognizable red straps and blue markings.

== Reactions ==
=== From Russian authorities ===
Moscow claimed that Ukrainian forces had "mercilessly shot unarmed Russian P.O.W.s." Valery Fadeyev, the chairman of the Presidential Council for Civil Society and Human Rights, said that Russia would "ask for a reaction and an investigation from the international community". Maria Zakharova, the spokeswoman for the Russian foreign ministry stated that the video shows an "execution" and that Russia wants an international investigation. She claimed that the film provided "additional evidence of the crimes of Ukrainian neo-Nazis and Ukraine's gross violation of international humanitarian law, particularly the Geneva Conventions."

Russia's defence ministry said the video showed the "deliberate and methodical murder of more than 10 immobilised Russian serviceman by degenerate Ukrainian soldiers", that the "brutal murder of Russian servicemen is neither the first, nor the only war crime" committed by Ukrainian forces, and that Ukrainian President Volodymyr Zelenskyy would "answer before the court of history and the people of Russia and Ukraine."

=== From Ukrainian authorities ===
Ukraine used the videos to highlight the military capabilities of their armed forces and highlight their "valiant attempts" to retake territory that had been taken by Russia earlier in the war.

Ukrainian ombudsman Dmytro Lubinets denied that Ukrainian forces had killed Russian prisoners of war, saying that the Russian soldiers committed an act of perfidy. He said that Russian soldiers had fired while the prisoners were turning themselves in.

On 20 November, the deputy prime minister Olha Stefanishyna promised to launch an investigation.

=== International reactions ===
The incident should be examined, according to the United Nations. A spokesman for the U.N. Human Rights Office, Marta Hurtado, stated: "The tapes are known to us, and we are investigating them. Allegations of the execution of those hors combat should be swiftly, thoroughly, and efficiently investigated, and any offenders should be brought to justice." On 25 November the UN High Commissioner for Human Rights Volker Türk said: "Our Monitoring Mission in Ukraine has conducted a preliminary analysis indicating that these disturbing videos are highly likely to be authentic in what they show" and called on the Ukrainian authorities to investigate the allegations of summary executions of Russian prisoners of war "in a manner that is – and is seen to be – independent, impartial, thorough, transparent, prompt and effective."

== See also ==
- Torture and castration of a Ukrainian POW in Pryvillia
- Torture of Russian soldiers in Mala Rohan
- War crimes in the 2022 Russian invasion of Ukraine
