= Vrinda Grover =

Indian lawyer, researcher, and human rights activist (born 1964)

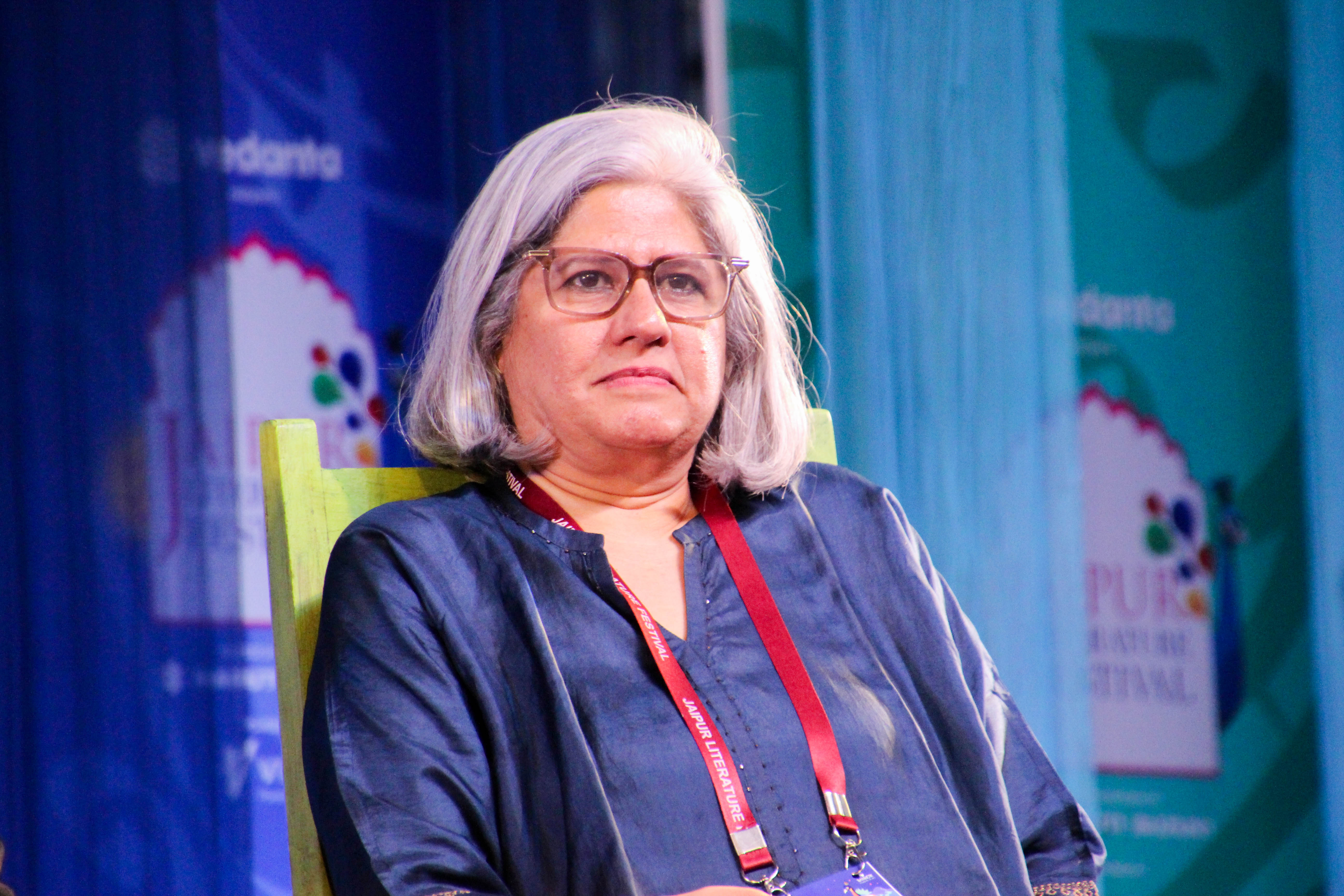
- Grover receives an honorary degree from SOAS University of London in 2018
- Education: St. Stephen's College of Delhi University (LL.B.)
- Known for: Chair of the Board, International Service for Human Rights
- Office: Member, Independent International Commission of Inquiry on Ukraine, 2024–present

Vrinda Grover (born 1964) is an Indian lawyer, researcher, and human rights and women's rights activist based in New Delhi, India. As a lawyer, she has appeared in prominent human rights cases and represented women and child survivors of domestic and sexual violence; victims and survivors of communal massacre, extrajudicial killings and custodial torture; sexual minorities; trade unions; and political activists. She is a member of the UN Independent International Commission of Inquiry on Ukraine.

Focused on the impunity of the state in relation to human rights violations, her research and writing inquires into the role of law in the subordination of women; the failure of the criminal justice system during communal and targeted violence; the effect of 'security' laws on human rights; rights of undocumented workers; challenges confronting internally displaced persons; and examines impunity for enforced disappearances and torture in conflict situations. Time magazine identified her as one of the 100 most influential people in the world in 2013.

== Education ==
Grover graduated from St. Stephen's College, Delhi, where she was a student in History. She obtained her degree in law from Delhi University and a Masters in Law from New York University.

== Career ==
=== Law ===
Grover has appeared for the victims in prominent cases such as the Soni Sori rape-torture case, 1984 anti-Sikh riots, 1987 Hashimpura police killings, 2004 Ishrat Jahan case, and the 2008 anti-Christian riots in Kandhamal. She contributed to the drafting of the 2013 Criminal Law Amendment to the law against sexual assault; the Protection of Children from Sexual Offences Act, 2012, and the Prevention of Torture Bill, 2010, a law for protection from Communal and Targeted Violence.

In 2001 Parliament Attack case, she served as counsel for S.A.R. Geelani, one of the main accused. In the aftermath of the 2013 Muzaffarnagar Massacre, she represented seven of the gangrape survivors of communal violence.

=== Organisations ===
She worked as the executive director of Multiple Action Research Group (MARG). She was a Research Fellow at the Nehru Memorial Museum & Library, Delhi. She serves as a trustee at the Centre for Social Justice and board member for Green Peace. She has actively engaged with UN human rights mechanisms including the Universal Periodic Review and UN Special Rapporteurs, UN Women India Civil Society Advisory Group; is a bureau member of South Asians for Human Rights (SAHR); a founder member of the Working Group on Human Rights in India and the UN (WGHR). She is also on the global board of The Fund for Global Human Rights. She has associated with Amnesty International, Human Rights Watch and the International Commission of Jurists on responses to torture, arbitrary detention, sexual violence and extra- judicial killings.

=== Activism ===
==== Early activism ====
In the 1980s, when Grover was a student at St Stephen's College, a 'tradition' existed of rating the female student population according to their physical attributes; the final calibration was summed up into a top 10 'chick chart' and pinned on the official noticeboard. A group of students, including her, decided to protest this. They were told they were breaking 'family tradition' and even threatened with expulsion. But they refused to back down. Ultimately, the institution banned the practice.

==== Recent years ====
She, along with a group of feminist lawyers and activists demanded that documentary India's Daughter be put on hold till the legal process was complete. However, this group of activists clarified that they did not endorse the Indian Government's move to ban the film. She has been vocal in speaking out against the death penalty in India. She spoke out against the appointment of Rajendra Kumar Pachauri as executive vice-chairman of TERI University, who was accused of sexually harassing a research scholar. Pachauri, in turn, filed a civil suit against Vrinda Grover for pursuing the allegations of sexual harassment against him.

==== Awareness speaker ====
She speaks critically of the Armed Forces (Special Powers) Act, the two finger test, and other issues at various events and on news channels.

==== Controversies ====
RG Kar Rape & Murder Case

Vrinda Grover started providing legal services on a pro bono basis to the victim's family from September 2024 in the rape and murder of a young on-duty doctor at RG Kar Medical College & Hospital in Kolkata on 9th August 2024. However, she withdrew from the case in December 2024, a few weeks before the High Court provided a final verdict in the trial of a civic volunteer and the alleged killer, Sanjay Roy. It was disclosed later that her team discouraged the victim's parents from attending the court proceedings while the witnesses were being questioned. She withdrew from the case after the victim's family requested her to file a Protest Petition or Narazi Petition based on their dissatisfaction with the investigation. The victim’s parents were, reportedly, dissatisfied with certain aspects of Grover’s questioning in court on their behalf. They also felt that some details of the case had been withheld from them by their counsel.
