= Brinton Lykes =

American psychologist (born 1949)

M. Brinton Lykes
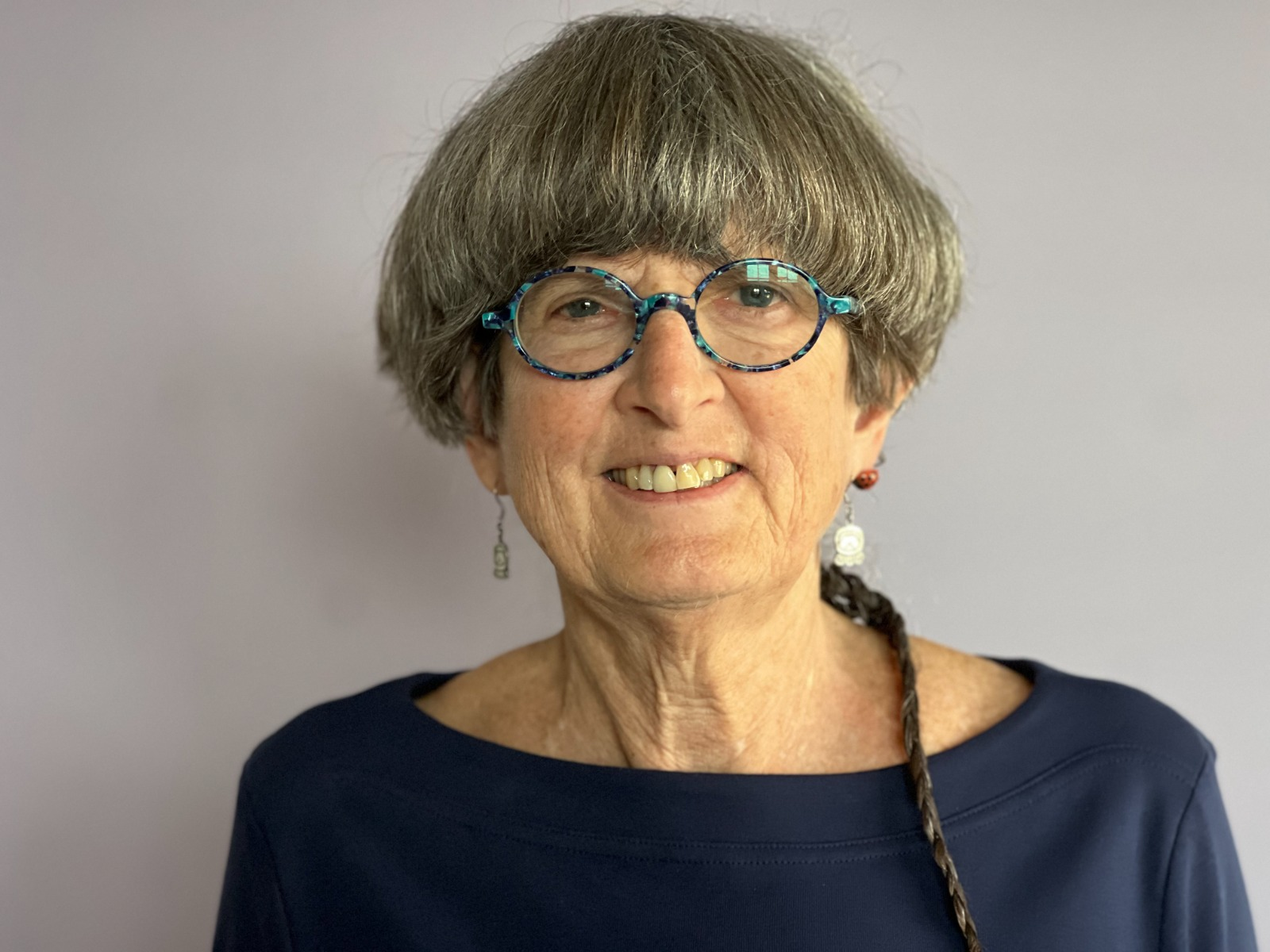
- Born: 1949 (age 76–77); New Orleans
- Education: B.A., M.Div., Ph.D.
- Alma mater: Hollins University; Harvard University; Boston College
- Scientific career
- Workplaces: Boston College
- Thesis: Autonomous individualism vs. social individuality: Towards an alternative understanding of the self (1984)

M. Brinton Lykes (born 1949) is an American psychologist whose work focuses on the psychosocial effects of state-sponsored terror and organized violence. She is currently a professor emerita of Community-Cultural Psychology at Boston College.

== Early life and education ==
Lykes originally hailed from New Orleans. She obtained her BA degree from Hollins University before proceeding to Harvard University where she obtained an M.Div. in Applied Theology. She obtained a Ph.D. in Community Social Psychology from Boston College.

Lykes has worked at Boston College since 1992 where she was promoted from associate professor to full professor in the Lynch School of Education and Human Development. She has held various posts including department chair and Associate Dean. Lykes also held academic and administrative roles in the Department of Psychology at the University of the Witwatersrand in Johannesburg, South Africa from 1999-2001.

== Work ==
Lykes activist scholarship has focused on understanding the impact of state-sponsored violence and terror. She has worked in multiple national and transnational contexts of armed conflict, state-sponsored violence and humanitarian disasters, including multiple decades in Central America, in particular with the Maya peoples of Guatemala. She has used participatory action research, creative arts and oral history as her primary research methods. She is the co-founder of the Ignacio Martín-Baró Fund for Mental Health and Human Rights.

From 2016-2025, she was the co-editor-in-chief of the International Journal of Transitional Justice. She also co-edited The New Deportations Delirium: Interdisciplinary Responses (New York University Press, 2015), with Daniel Kanstroom.

In 2016, Lykes was promoted from Associate Director to Co-Director of the Center for Human Rights and International Justice at Boston College, where she served until 2025

== Awards ==
Lykes has received a variety of awards for her work including the APA International Humanitarian Award of the American Psychological Association, the Seymour B. Sarason Award for Community Research and Action the Florence L. Denmark and Mary E. Reuder Award for Outstanding International Contributions to the Psychology of Women and Gender and the Ignacio Martín-Baró Lifetime Peace Practitioner Award of the APA Society for the Study of Peace, Conflict and Violence. She was also awarded a Doctor of Humane Letters (Honoria causa) by Lewis & Clark College in 2005.IIn 2021, Lykes and Alison Crosby received the Raphael Lemkin Book Award from the Institute for the Study of Genocide for their book Beyond Repair? Mayan Women's Protagonism in the Aftermath of Genocidal Harm. The book also received an honorable mention for the 2020 CALACS book Prize.

== Research focus ==
Lykes' work is situated within community and cultural psychologies and examines the effects of political violence, coerced displacement, and structural inequalities. She draws on the creative arts and participatory and action-oriented methods, accompanying those who have been affected by human rights abuses in seeking truth, justice and redress from genocidal violence. These processes facilitate communities' participation in identifying, analyzing, and documenting local challenges and taking actions towards transformative change.

Her work focuses on women and Indigenous communities in Latin America, especially Guatemala. She investigates how memory, narrative, and testimony become means through which those who lived through experiences of genocidal violence draw from their cosmovisions and praxes to make meaning of themselves and their communities

Liberation psychology is another critical domain of her work, where she conducts research on everyday lived experiences in the social context of ethnic conflict, social exclusion and structural injustice, as well as how communities respond to these conditions. Additionally, she studied the realities experienced by migrant families with a specific focus on the psycho-social consequences of detention and deportation. An example in one of her individually-published works emphasizes her efforts in "undoing racism" and the methods she chose in order to achieve that feat, through advocacy and empathy in the knowing of lived experiences.

== Publications ==
- Lykes, M. Brinton. 1996. "A conversation between William Ryan and M. Brinton Lykes". Section VI in Myths about the powerless: contesting social inequalities. Edited by M. Brinton Lykes, Ali Banuazizi, Ramsay Liem and Michael Morris. Philadelphia, Pennsylvania: Temple University Press.
- Lykes, M. Brinton. 1996. "Introduction" in Myths about the powerless: Contesting social inequalities. Edited by M. Brinton Lykes, Ali Banuazizi, Ramsay Liem and Michael Morris. Philadelphia, Pennsylvania: Temple University Press.
- Lykes, M. B. (1997). “Activist participatory research among the Maya of Guatemala: Constructing meanings from situated knowledge.” Journal of Social Issues, 53(4), 725–746.
- Comas-Díaz, L.; Lykes, M. B.; Alarcón, R. D. (1998). “Ethnic conflict and the psychology of liberation in Guatemala, Peru, and Puerto Rico.” American Psychologist, 53(7), 778–792.
- Women of PhotoVoice/ADMI & Lykes, M.B. (2000). Voces e imágenes: Mujeres Mayas Ixiles de Chajul/Voices and images: Mayan Ixil women of Chajul. Guatemala: Magna Terra. Texts in Spanish and English, with a methodology chapter by Lykes.
- Lykes, M. B.; Blanche, M. T.; Hamber, B. (2003). “Narrating survival and change in Guatemala and South Africa: The politics of representation and a liberatory community psychology.” American Journal of Community Psychology, 31(1–2), 79–90.
- Lykes, M. B.; Crosby, A. (2011). “Mayan women survivors speak: The gendered relations of truth telling in postwar Guatemala.” International Journal of Transitional Justice, 5(3), 456–476.
- Lykes, M. B. (2013). “Participatory and action research as a transformative praxis: Responding to humanitarian crises from the margins.” American Psychologist, 68(8), 774–785.
- Lykes, M. B. & Sibley, E. (2014). "Liberation psychology and pragmatic solidarity: North-South collaborations through the Ignacio Martín-Baró Fund". Peace and Conflict: Journal of Peace Psychology, 20(3), 209–226.
- Lykes, M.B. (2014). "Maya Women of Chajul". In Coghlan, D. & Brydon-Miller, M. (Eds). The SAGE encyclopedia of action research. (Vols. 1–2) (pp. 529–532) . Thousand Oaks, CA: SAGE.
- Lykes, M.B. (2014). "Ignacio Martín-Baró". In Coghlan, D. & Brydon-Miller, M. (Eds). The SAGE encyclopedia of action research. (Vols. 1–2) (pp. 523–526). Thousand Oaks, CA: SAGE
- Brabeck, K. M.; Lykes, M. B.; Hunter, C. (2014). “The psychosocial impact of detention and deportation on U.S. migrant children and families.” American Journal of Orthopsychiatry, 84(5), 496–505.
- Kanstroom, D.; Lykes, M. B. (eds.) (2015). The New Deportations Delirium: Interdisciplinary Responses. New York: New York University Press.
- Crosby, A.; Lykes, M. B. (2019). Beyond Repair? Mayan Women’s Protagonism in the Aftermath of Genocidal Harm. New Brunswick, NJ: Rutgers University Press.
