= Independent International Commission of Inquiry on Ukraine =

United Nations commission on the Russo-Ukrainian War

- Abbreviation: IICOI Ukraine
- Formation: 4 March 2022; 4 years ago
- Type: United Nations commission of inquiry, advisory board
- Legal status: Active
- Headquarters: Geneva, Switzerland
- Chair: Erik Møse
- Parent organization: United Nations Human Rights Council
- Website: Official website

The Independent International Commission of Inquiry on Ukraine is a United Nations commission of inquiry established by the United Nations Human Rights Council on 4 March 2022 with a mandate to investigate violations of human rights and of international humanitarian law in the Russian invasion of Ukraine. The Commission delivered its first reports on 18 October 2022 and 16 March 2023. The Commission's mandate was extended in April 2025, through resolution 58/24.

== Creation ==
On 3 March 2022, the United Nations Human Rights Council (UNHRC) started debating the effect of the Russian invasion of Ukraine on human rights. On 4 March, in resolution A/HRC/49/L.1, the UNHRC condemned the violations of human rights and international law caused by the full-scale Russian invasion, called for Russia to stop its violations in Ukraine, and for Russia to completely withdraw from internationally recognised Ukrainian territory to prevent further violations, and voted to establish an independent international commission of inquiry on Ukraine. The UNHRC passed the resolution with 32 states in favour, 13 absentions and 2 (Eritrea and Russia) against.

The Russian representative on the UNHRC, Evgeny Ustinov, called the commission of inquiry "a mere waste of resources, which could better be used to help civilians in Ukraine". Human Rights Watch expressed its support for the UNHRC to create a commission of inquiry into violations of human rights and international humanitarian law in Ukraine by all groups involved.

== Structure ==
The commission of inquiry was initially set up, in March 2022, to include three human rights experts for one year, headed by Erik Møse from Norway, and also including Jasminka Džumhur from Bosnia and Herzegovina and Pablo de Greiff from Colombia. In June 2023, Vrinda Grover, a lawyer from India, replaced Džumhur.

== Aims ==
The goal of the commission was to investigate all alleged violations and abuses of human rights and international humanitarian law in the Russian invasion of Ukraine. The commission was required to make recommendations based on its investigation, first in September 2022 to the 51st and 52nd sessions of the UNHRC and the 77th session of the United Nations General Assembly.

== Reports ==
=== 2022 ===
On 18 October 2022, the Commission published its report on events between the end of February and March 2022 in the four regions of Kyiv, Chernihiv, Kharkiv, and Sumy. The Commission found that Russian armed forces were responsible for the great majority of human rights and international humanitarian law violations, but that Ukrainian forces also violated international humanitarian law, notably in two incidents that qualified as war crimes.

=== 2023 ===
In a March 2023 report, the Commission found that Russia had committed numerous violations of international human rights law and international humanitarian law in Ukraine, and that many of these breaches constituted war crimes. Evidence gathered by the Commission included:

- site visits to 56 locations in Ukraine;
- interviews with 595 people, including refugees in Estonia and Georgia;
- site visits to places destroyed in the war, grave sites; and sites where Russians detained and tortured prisoners; and
- documentary and physical evidence, including written records, photographs and videos, satellite images and weapon fragments.

The Ukrainian government responded to inquiries from the commission; the Russian authorities refused to cooperate.

The report concluded: "that Russian authorities have committed numerous violations of international humanitarian law and violations of international human rights law, in addition to a wide range of war crimes," These included that of excessive incidental death, injury or damage, wilful killings, torture, inhuman treatment, unlawful confinement, rape, and unlawful transfers and deportations. The commission also found that torture by Russians and the waves of Russian airstrikes starting 10 October 2022 on Ukraine's energy infrastructure might amount to crimes against humanity.

On 25 September 2023, Commission Chair Erik Møse delivered an update at the 54th session of the UN Human Rights Council, saying "The Commission is also concerned about allegations of genocide in Ukraine. For instance, some of the rhetoric transmitted in Russian state and other media may constitute incitement to genocide. The Commission is continuing its investigations on such issues."

=== 2024 ===
The commission's 15 March 2024 report included documented cases of sexual violence and torture and Russian ill-treatment of Ukrainian prisoners of war. A September 2024 update by the chair of the commission presented evidence of torture, sexual violence, and aerial bombing of civilian infrastructure including critical energy infrastructure.

=== 2025 ===
In its March 2025 report, the commission said that it had found evidence for Russia having committed the crimes against humanity of torture and of enforced disappearances based on interviews with about 1800 victims and witnesses. Russian authorities had failed to respond to 31 "communications" by the commission, among which some communications requested information about Russian victims. The commission found that both Russian and Ukrainian forces had committed the war crime of killing wounded soldiers hors de combat by drones, and found some cases of Ukrainian authorities violating the human rights of suspected collaborators.

In May 2025, the commission published a report in which it stated that Russian drone attacks on Ukrainian civilians in Kherson Oblast were systematic and consistent over ten months over a wide geographic area and intentionally directed at civilians. The commission inferred that the attacks were planned and organised and thus constitute the crime against humanity of murder, and possibly also the crime against humanity of forced population transfer.

== See also ==
- Allegations of genocide of Ukrainians in the Russo-Ukrainian War
- International Criminal Court investigation in Ukraine
- Legality of the Russian invasion of Ukraine
- Ukraine v. Russian Federation (2022)
- Special Tribunal for the Crime of Aggression against Ukraine
- United Nations Human Rights Monitoring Mission in Ukraine
