= International Center for Transitional Justice =

American non-profit human rights organization

International Center for Transitional Justice (ICTJ)
- Founded: 2001
- Type: Non-profit NGO
- Purpose: Transitional justice, human rights
- Location: New York City, United States
- Region served: Worldwide
- Key people: David Tolbert (President)
- Website: ICTJ.org

The International Center for Transitional Justice (ICTJ) was founded in 2001 as a non-profit organization dedicated to pursuing accountability for mass atrocity and human rights abuse through transitional justice mechanisms.

ICTJ officially opened its doors in New York City on March 1, 2001, and within six months was operating in more than a dozen countries, as requests for assistance poured in.

A collection of materials assembled by the ICTJ covering the years 1981–2008 is housed at the Duke University library.

== Notable staff ==
- Alex Boraine, Co-Founder and First president of ICTJ
- Priscilla Hayner, Co-Founder of ICTJ and former director of its Sierra Leone, Peru, and Ghana Programs
- Paul van Zyl, Co-Founder of ICTJ and CEO of PeaceVentures
- Juan E. Mendez, President Emeritus of ICTJ
- Fernando Travesí, Executive Director of ICTJ
- Pablo de Greiff, Honorary Council member (Director of Research, 2001–14, 2015-18, and from 2012 to 2018 a United Nations special rapporteur)
