= United Nations Human Rights Monitoring Mission in Ukraine =

- Abbreviation: HRMMU
- Established: 2014 (11 years ago)
- Founders: United Nations
- Types: organization
- Directors: Danielle Bell (c. 2023–present)
- Parent organisations: Office of the United Nations High Commissioner for Human Rights
- Employees: 86 (2022)

The United Nations Human Rights Monitoring Mission in Ukraine (HRMMU) is a group of human rights monitors established in Ukraine in 2014 following the Revolution of Dignity and the start of the Russo-Ukrainian War by the secretary-general of the United Nations.

== Actions ==
Activities by HRMMU have included monitoring the human-rights situation throughout Ukraine, including Crimea and areas of Donbas not under government control; supporting state institutions and civil society in developing human-rights related law and documentation.

HRMMU's scope evolved with the scale of the conflict. From 2014 to 2021 it documented abuses linked to the annexation of Crimea, hostilities in eastern Ukraine and secret detentions by all sides. Following the full-scale 2022 Russian invasion of Ukraine, HRMMU significantly expanded its field presence and began to issue monthly civilian-casualty updates alongside its quarterly reports.

== Organisation ==
HRMMU had offices in several Ukrainian towns including Kyiv, Kharkiv, Donetsk, Luhansk, Kramatorsk, Mariupol and Odesa in 2020, prior to the 2022 full-scale Russian invasion and retained or shifted to offices in Kyiv, Dnipro, Odesa, Poltava and Uzhhorod by late 2022, following the invasion.

Year	Head of Mission	Staff count
2016	Fiona Frazer	
2020		57
2022	Matilda Bogner	below 60
2025	Danielle Bell	86

== Method ==
HRMMU investigations are primarily based on first-hand interviews with victims and witnesses.

== Reports ==
On 30 March 2022, Michelle Bachelet, the UN High Commissioner for Human Rights, stated that HRMMU had recorded 24 "credible allegations" of Russian use of cluster munitions and 77 incidents of damage to medical facilities during the 2022 Russian invasion of Ukraine. Bachelet stated, "The massive destruction of civilian objects and the high number of civilian casualties strongly indicate that the fundamental principles of distinction, proportionality and precaution have not been sufficiently adhered to."

In February 2025, HRMMU reported a significant increase in the number of executions of captured Ukrainian soldiers, with 79 POWs killed in 24 incidents since August 2024. In its 42nd periodic report, HRMMU stated that from 1 December 2024 to 31 May 2025, there had been 968 civilian deaths and 4,807 injuries, 37 percent more than a year earlier.

== See also ==
- Independent International Commission of Inquiry on Ukraine
- OSCE Special Monitoring Mission to Ukraine
