= Thomas J. Madden =

- Born: October 5, 1938 (age 87); Philadelphia, Pennsylvania
- Occupations: Author, Inventor, PR advisor
- Website: http://www.transmediagroup.com

Thomas J. Madden (born October 5, 1938) is an American author, speechwriter and public relations expert, founder of the international public relations firm TransMedia Group.

== Career ==
Thomas Madden received a BS degree in journalism from Temple University in 1962. In 1964, he moved to Atlantic City, New Jersey, and began working as a reporter at The Press of Atlantic City. In 1966, Madden and his family relocated to Philadelphia where he became a reporter and feature writer at The Philadelphia Inquirer. After receiving an MA from the Annenberg School of Communications at The University of Pennsylvania in 1970 while working the night shift as a reporter, Madden taught journalism part-time at Rutgers University before moving his family to New Orleans in late 1970, where he became an assistant professor of journalism at Loyola University. In 1974, Madden left college teaching, moved his family back to the Northeast and took a position with the well-known public relations firm Dudley Anderson Yutzy (now Ogilvy & Mather Public Relations Group) in Manhattan, where he worked on the firm's largest accounts, including Kellogg's of Battle Creek, MI, writing speeches for the company's then CEO, William LaMothe, which were printed in The New York Times and Vital Speeches of the Day.

In 1977, Madden joined American Broadcasting Company as Director of Public Relations Planning. At ABC he wrote speeches for and media-trained senior executives, including the company’s founder Leonard Goldenson and programming whiz Fred Silverman who in 1980 brought Madden with him to NBC after becoming its president and CEO. Silverman appointed Madden to Vice President, Assistant to the President.

Madden worked at NBC in both executive administration and programming before leaving and starting TransMedia Consultants, Inc., in 1981, which became a boutique PR agency in Manhattan, serving such clients as AT&T, Drexel Burnham Lambert, Met Life, and The City of New York.

In 1987, Madden and his wife and partner, Angela who had become the firm’s CFO, relocated the business to Palm Beach, FL, renaming it TransMedia Group. In 1999, Madden and his wife bought a building in downtown Boca Raton, which became The TransMedia Building, where the firm grew to become one of the largest independent PR firms in Florida and where it currently operates. The firm’s clients have included AT&T, American Red Cross, City of New York, GL Homes, Jordache Enterprises, McCormick and Schmick's, Rexall Sundown and Stanley Steemer.

== Achievements ==
- Inventor of the Knife and Forklift, a patented combination of utensils and dumbbells designed to help overeaters slow down and exercise while eating.
- Accredited Member of the Public Relations Society of America.
- Author of several books, including a memoir, Spin Man (1997) and King of the Condo, (1999) a satiric murder mystery novel based on his personal experiences as a tormented president of a Florida condo.
- Platinum author on EvanCarmichael.com
- Named Writer of the Month for his screenplay Father's Day Ghost Story Literary Agent Showcase
- SpotLight Trustee member of the Boca Raton Chamber of Commerce

== Awards ==
Received a Bronze Anvil Award in 1981 from The Public Relations Society of America for a public service campaign promoting fair housing in New York City, which Madden created for The City of New York.
