= 2022 Russian beheading of a Ukrainian prisoner of war =

- Part of Russo-Ukrainian war
- Location: Ukraine
- Type: Execution

A video depicting the decapitation of a Ukrainian prisoner of war by Russian soldiers was first published online on 11 April 2023, and then circulated through pro-Russian sources. The video showed masked Russian soldiers cutting off the head of a Ukrainian soldier who was presumed to be a prisoner of war.

The video attracted the attention of many political figures and media. As a result of the video's graphic nature, comparisons to the Islamic State were made. A number of pro-Russian Telegram channels also praised the video.

== Beheading ==
The first known publication of the video occurred 11 April 2023 at 22:24 Moscow time. At 22:40 it was distributed by Vladislav Pozdnyakov, founder of Male State, an extremist political party in Russia.

Earlier, on 8 April, pro-Russian Telegram channels began to distribute another video of beheaded Ukrainian soldiers showing two headless corpses of Ukrainian soldiers lying on the ground next to a broken armored vehicle. The hands of the dead soldiers were also cut off.

In the video, a man is lying on the ground, dressed in a military uniform, which has a yellow band on the sleeve, used by the Armed Forces of Ukraine. A masked man with a white band on his arm used by the Russian military is seen standing over him. This man then decapitates the prisoner lying on the ground. The one who cuts off his head is given instructions over the radio. The victim screams in pain. Nearby there are people shouting in Russian: "We work, brothers! Cut it off, asshole! Break his spine! What, you've never cut off some heads? Until the end, asshole." After the decapitation, the operator of the video clip said: "Put it in the fucking bag. And send it to the commander."

== Investigation ==
On 12 April 2023, the Security Service of Ukraine launched a pre-trial investigation into the matter. The war crime captured on the video was determined to be a violation of the laws and customs of war (Part 2 of Article 438 of the Criminal Code of Ukraine).

According to the Geneva Convention on the Treatment of Prisoners of War signed by Russia, prisoners must be guaranteed humane conditions while in detention, and beheading is a war crime.

Prior to the publication of this video, scenes of cruelty at this level concerning the war in Ukraine, were not published in open sources. The most brutal thing that was previously published is footage from the summer of 2022, when a man in a Russian military uniform cuts off the genitals of a man in a Ukrainian military uniform and then kills him. Similar methods were practiced in Syria in 2017 by members of the Wagner Group, when they cut off the head and limbs of a Syrian on video using a sledgehammer, which has become a symbol of Wagner. However, in Syria the beheading was done to a person who was already either unconscious or dead, not alive and conscious. Proekt considers the video the most brutal of the war in Ukraine and emphasizes that in the past such executions were carried out only by members of the Islamic State. The UN mission in Geneva called the video "particularly horrifying."

On 21 April, Hungarian news portal Telex.hu claimed that the beheaded Ukrainian soldier had been identified as Serhii Andriiovych Potoki (Сергій Андрійович Потоки; Hungarian: Szerhij Andrijovics Pataki). Potoki is from Vynohradiv (Hungarian: Nagyszőlős), Zakarpattia Oblast, a town with an important Ukrainian Hungarian minority. Potoki was married, and had two children, a 6-year-old daughter and an 18-month-old son. He worked in a local market selling fruits and vegetables prior to being mobilized. The video would have been taken with his own phone, which the Russians took from him. A photo of his severed head was then sent to friends and contacts on his phone. It was also claimed that the beheading took place in Bakhmut, which became a prolonged battle during the invasion. Ukrainian authorities have not officially confirmed that Potoki is the victim. Potoki's sister, who was interviewed regarding the issue, has expressed skepticism about this claim.

The Russian soldiers who murdered the soldier were possibly members of the Akhmat unit, a Chechen Kadyrovite paramilitary unit. Alternatively, they might have been members of the Wagner Group or of the Rusich Group. Kyrylo Budanov, chief of the Main Directorate of Intelligence of the Ministry of Defense of Ukraine, said that the identity of the perpetrators is already known but that it could not be revealed yet. He insinuated that they may already be dead.

== Reactions ==
=== In Ukraine ===
Head of the Office of the President Andriy Yermak wrote a phrase on Telegram that most likely refers to this event: "There will be an answer and responsibility for everything." The President of Ukraine Volodymyr Zelenskyy in a video, noted that: "There is something that no one in the world can ignore: how easily these beasts kill" and the video "shows Russia as it is." Ukraine also called on the International Criminal Court to launch an investigation.

=== In Russia ===
The video evoked a favorable reaction from various pro-Russian channels. In particular, the Telegram channel of the neo-Nazi Rusich Group posted a message saying: "You will be surprised how many of these videos will gradually pop up", accompanying the message with a smiley emoji.

Putin's press secretary Dmitry Peskov agreed that the footage was "horrific", but said it should be checked for authenticity.

In April 2023, Wagner PMC leader Yevgeniy Prigozhin stated “It’s bad when people’s heads are cut off, but I haven’t found anywhere that this is happening near Bakhmut and that Wagner PMC fighters are participating in the execution.”

=== Other countries ===
The UN Human Rights Monitoring Mission in Ukraine expressed outrage at “particularly horrific videos”, emphasizing that these are not isolated cases.

EU Foreign Service spokeswoman Nabila Massrali said that if the video's authenticity is confirmed, it will become another brutal reminder of the inhuman nature of Russian aggression. The President of the European Council, Charles Michel, also reacted to the video, saying that the EU will do everything possible to ensure that responsibility and justice defeat terror and impunity.

Estonian Foreign Minister Urmas Reinsalu expressed indignation at the fact that against the backdrop of such crimes committed by Russian troops, a discussion continues about the possibility of Russian participation in the Olympic Games.

Deputy Chairman of the Bundestag Katrin Göring-Eckardt said that the video is yet another proof of the brutality of the Russians, and those responsible for numerous war crimes must be held accountable.

British Ambassador to Ukraine Melinda Simmons said the video is a new item on the list of accusations against Russia related to the invasion of Ukraine.

Council of Europe Secretary General Maria Pejcinovic Buric condemned the inhumane treatment of Ukrainian prisoners of war and called for the perpetrators to be brought to justice.

U.S. Ambassador to Ukraine Bridget Brink also said that the brutality of the Russian troops is becoming more obvious with every day of the invasion, and such acts will not go unpunished.

Czech President Petr Pavel said, "If the video is genuine, it puts the Russian military on par with the Islamic State."

== See also ==
- Torture and castration of a Ukrainian POW in Pryvillia
- Execution of Oleksandr Matsievskyi
- Murder of Yevgeny Nuzhin
