= International Journal of Transitional Justice =

Academic journal

- Discipline: International relations, law, political science and transitional justice
- Language: English
- Edited by: M. Brinton Lykes; Hugo van der Merwe

Publication details
- History: 2007–present
- Publisher: Oxford University Press
- Frequency: Triannual
- Impact factor: 1.250 (2015)

Standard abbreviations
- ISO 4: Int. J. Transitional Justice

Indexing
- ISSN: 1752-7716 (print); 1752-7724 (web)
- LCCN: 2007206131
- OCLC no.: 974864567

Links
- Journal homepage; Online access

The International Journal of Transitional Justice is an interdisciplinary peer-reviewed academic journal published triannually by Oxford University Press to provide a forum for transitional justice as an academic discipline in its own right. It was established in 2007 and the editors-in-chief are M. Brinton Lykes (Boston College) and Hugo van der Merwe (Centre for the Study of Violence and Reconciliation, South Africa).

== Abstracting and indexing ==
The journal is abstracted and indexed in:

- Google Scholar
- International Bibliography of the Social Sciences (IBSS)
- SCOPUS
- Social Sciences Citation Index

According to the Journal Citation Reports, the journal has a 2015 impact factor of 1.250, ranking it 49th out of 163 journals in the category "Political Science", 25th out of 86 journals in the category "International Relations" and 45th out of 147 journals in the category "Law".

== See also ==
- List of international relations journals
- List of law journals
- List of political science journals
