= United Nations Principles to Combat Impunity =

The United Nations Principles to Combat Impunity, officially Set of Principles for the Protection and Promotion of Human Rights Through Action to Combat Impunity, is an international soft law document updated in 2005.
