= Execution of Oleksandr Matsievskyi =

Russian execution of a Ukrainian prisoner of war

Oleksandr Matsievskyi Олександр Мацієвський
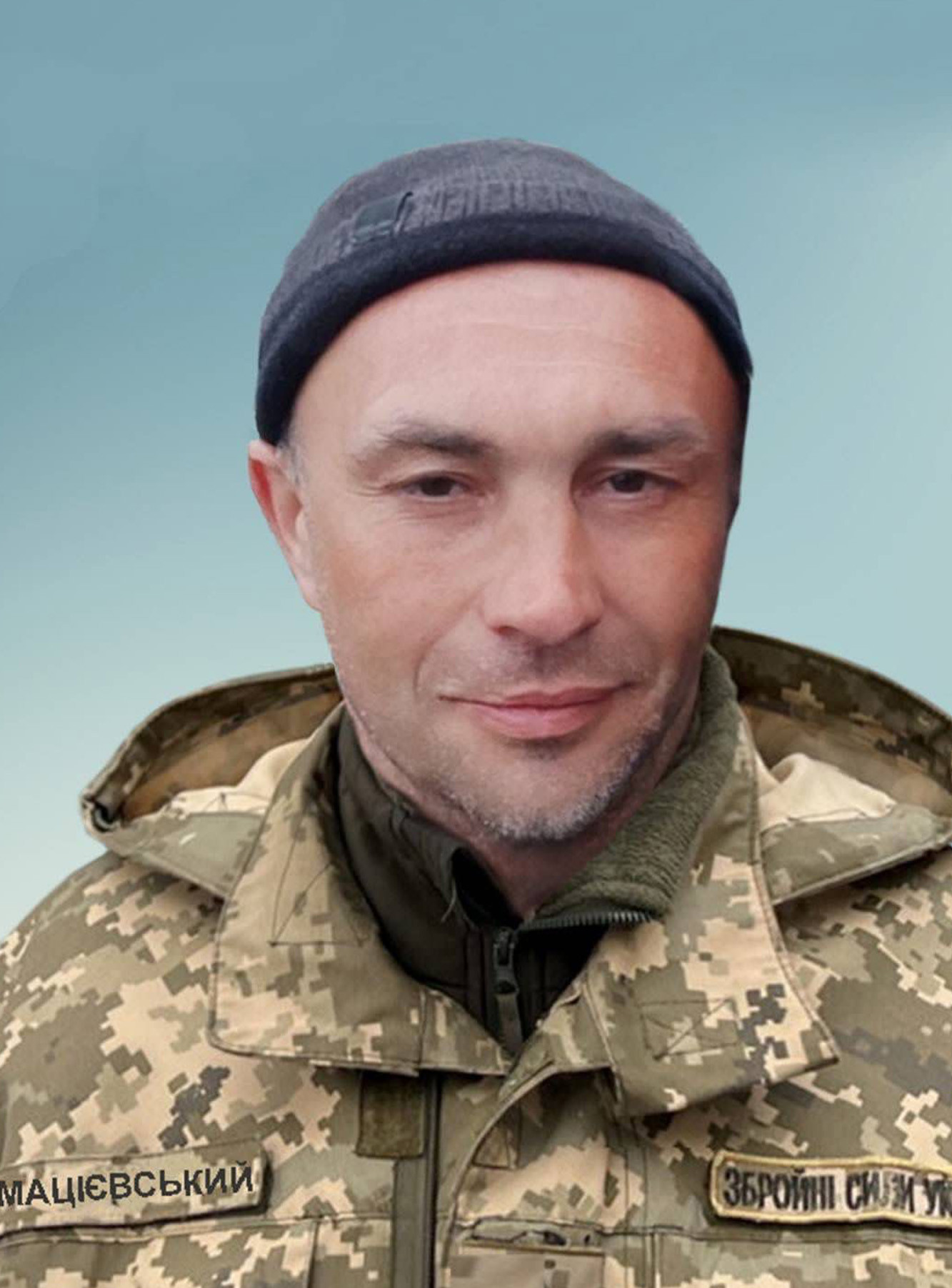
- Born: 10 May 1980; Chișinău, Moldavian SSR, Soviet Union (now Moldova)
- Died: 30 December 2022 (aged 42)
- Military career
- Branch: Ukrainian Ground Forces
- Unit: 119th Chernihiv Defense Brigade
- Conflicts: Russo-Ukrainian War
- Awards: Hero of Ukraine

Oleksandr Ihorovych Matsievskyi (Ukrainian: Олександр Ігорович Мацієвський, pronounced [olekˈsɑndr ˈiɦorowɪtʃ mɐts⁽ʲ⁾iˈjɛu̯sʲkɪj]; 10 May 1980 – 30 December 2022) was a Moldovan-born Ukrainian Ground Forces member and captive executed by Russian soldiers during the Battle of Bakhmut in the Russian invasion of Ukraine in late December 2022. The video of the execution circulated online around 6 March 2023, showing a soldier without weapons, smoking a cigarette, saying "Slava Ukraini" and then being shot with automatic weapons from multiple sides. The 30th Mechanized Brigade initially named Tymofii Shadura as the victim and a video of the shooting was shared on social media. Later reports suggested Matsievskyi as a credible alternative identification, which was subsequently confirmed by the Ukrainian government.

== Execution ==
On 6 March 2023, a graphic 12-second video was published showing an unidentified soldier in camouflage Ukrainian uniform, unarmed, standing in a shallow trench in a winter wood, calmly puffing a cigarette. As the man is heard saying "Slava Ukraini" ("Glory to Ukraine"), salvos of automatic weapons from multiple sides are heard and seen shooting the man, who collapses. Voices in the Russian language are heard saying "Die, bitch" (Сдохни, сука; Sdokhni, suka). Before the murder, he was allegedly forced to dig his own grave, in the video he is in a hole, and there is a shovel behind him.

== Victim ==
Members of the open-source intelligence community suggested more than six names for the man shot in the video. The captive and victim's identity was debated mainly between Tymofii Shadura and Oleksandr Matsievskyi for a few days.

On 7 March, the soldier was first identified by Ukrainian officials as Tymofii Shadura (also spelled as Tymofiy Shadura or Timofey Shadura; Ukrainian: Тимофій Миколайович Шадура, pronounced [tɪmoˈfij mɪkoˈlɑjowɪtʃ ʃɐˈdurɐ]; born 7 January 1982). Shadura was a Ukrainian soldier, a serviceman of the 30th Mechanized Brigade of the Armed Forces of Ukraine, and had been missing since February 3 near the village of Zaliznianske (Soledar urban hromada, Donetsk Oblast). BBC News Ukrainian spoke to a family member who seemed to recognize him. A woman who identified herself as the soldier's sister said that her brother could "definitely stand up to the Russians like that" and that "he never hid the truth in his life, and he definitely wouldn't hide it in front of the enemy".

As of 10 March, Oleksandr Ihorovych Matsievskyi (Ukrainian: Олександр Ігорович Мацієвський), a 42-year-old Ukrainian soldier deployed to Bakhmut in November 2022 and who also disappeared, remained a credible alternative due to contextual and visual similarities. Matsievskyi disappeared earlier while bearing similar bandages as the executed soldier's. Matsievskyi's territorial defense forces' comrades reporting his group of four soldiers went missing on 30 December 2022, following a failed counter attack on the outskirts of Soledar. Matsievskyi's body, heavily damaged by shots, was exchanged in January, returned to his village by February, and is now buried in Nizhyn, where he worked as an electrician. The local mayor, Matsievskyi's family and others claim to have recognized him in the video.

Despite calls to recognize Shadura or Matsievskyi posthumously as a Ukrainian hero, individuals in both Shadura and Matsievskyi's villages called for caution and to wait for forensic investigations and official conclusions, sending empathic support to each other. Matsievskyi was subsequently officially identified by the Ukrainian government as the subject of the video. Matsievskyi was born in Chișinău, and lived in Moldova for 28 years before moving to Ukraine. The Ministry of Foreign Affairs and European Integration of Moldova confirmed that Matsievskyi held dual Moldovan–Ukrainian citizenship. Matsievskyi's Romanian name was Alexandr Mațievschii.

== Reactions ==
=== Ukraine ===
Ukrainian officials reacted quickly, calling to identify the killers and for International Criminal Court (ICC) investigations. On 6 March 2023, Ukrainian president Volodymyr Zelenskyy rapidly reacted to the execution as he released a video denouncing the crime. Later that day, the Main Investigation Department of the Security Service of Ukraine registered criminal proceedings over the video.

Prosecutor General of Ukraine Andriy Kostin said that criminal proceedings have been opened over the shooting of the prisoner under article 438, part 2 of the Criminal Code — violation of the laws and customs of war, adding that "[e]ven war has its own laws ... There are rules of international law systematically ignored by the Russian criminal regime. But sooner or later, there will be punishment". Ukrainian foreign minister Dmytro Kuleba called on ICC prosecutor Karim Khan to investigate the incident. According to Kuleba, the video is more "proof that this war is genocidal". The Verkhovna Rada Commissioner for Human Rights Dmytro Lubinets emphasized that Ukraine's goal, as well as that of the entire democratic world, is to bring Russia to justice.

The Servant of the People party announced that once all the circumstances and identifying the deceased were established, it would send an appeal to Zelenskyy to grant the soldier the title of Hero of Ukraine posthumously. On 12 March 2023, Zelenskyy conferred the title of Hero of Ukraine on Matsievskyi, posting on Twitter, "A Ukrainian warrior. A man who will be known and remembered forever. For his bravery, for his confidence in Ukraine and for his 'Glory to Ukraine!'".

=== Russia ===
Russia has not publicly condemned the execution and continues to deny any war crimes during the invasion of Ukraine.

=== Others ===
The execution has been commented on by journalists in other countries. The soldier's attitude and the phrase "Slava Ukraini" in the face of enemy forces has been compared to the Snake Island "Russian warship, go fuck yourself" phrase early in 2022. On 13 March, the Ministry of Foreign Affairs and European Integration of Moldova condemned the killing of Matsievskyi and called it a war crime and a violation of international law.

== Legacy ==
In April 2023, a street in Matsievskyi's hometown Nizhyn, Chernihiv Oblast, was renamed in honor of Oleksandr Matsievskyi. On 25 November 2023 a statue of him was unveiled in the same city.

== See also ==
- Beheading of a Ukrainian prisoner of war in summer 2022
- Command responsibility
- Execution of Nguyễn Văn Lém
- Maqbool Hussain
- Prisoner of war
- Third Geneva Convention
- Treatment of prisoners of war in the Russian invasion of Ukraine
- War crimes in the Russian invasion of Ukraine
