= Transitional justice =

Measures implemented to respond to large-scale human rights violations

Chief Prosecutor Julio César Strassera reads closing arguments during the Trial of the Juntas, which targeted personnel of Argentina's ousted National Reorganization Process regime.

Transitional justice is a process which responds to human rights violations through judicial redress, political reforms and cultural healing efforts and other measures in order to prevent the recurrence of human rights abuse in a region or country. Transitional justice consists of judicial and non-judicial measures implemented in order to redress legacies of human rights abuses and foster reconciliation. Such mechanisms "include criminal prosecutions, truth commissions, reparations programs, and various kinds of institutional reforms" as well as memorials, apologies, and various art forms. Transitional justice is instituted at a point of political transition classically from war to positive peace, or more broadly from violence and repression to societal stability (though some times it is done years later) and it is informed by a society's desire to rebuild social trust, reestablish what is right from what is wrong, repair a fractured justice system, and build a democratic system of governance. Given different contexts and implementation the ability to achieve these outcomes varies. The core value of transitional justice is the very notion of justice—which does not necessarily mean criminal justice. This notion and the political transformation, such as regime change or transition from conflict are thus linked to a more peaceful, certain, and democratic future.

Transitional justice in the modern era has received greater attention from both academics and policymakers. It is also widely discussed in political and legal circles, especially in transitional societies. During political transitions from authoritarian or dictatorial regimes or from civil conflicts to democracy, transitional justice has often provided opportunities for such societies to address past human rights abuses, mass atrocities, or other forms of severe trauma in order to increase the probability of a transition into a more democratic, just, peaceful future.

== History ==
The origins of the transitional justice field can be traced back to the post-World War II period in Europe with the establishment of the International Military Tribunal at Nuremberg and the various de-Nazification programs in Germany and the trials of Japanese soldiers at the Tokyo Tribunal. What became known as the "Nuremberg Trials", when the victorious allied forces extended criminal justice to Japanese and German soldiers and their leaders for war crimes committed during the war, marked the genesis of transitional justice. The field gained momentum and coherence during the 1980s and onwards, beginning with the trials of former members of the military juntas in Greece (1975), and Argentina (Trial of the Juntas, 1983). The focus of transitional justice in the 1970s and 1980s was on criminal justice with a focus on human rights promotion. This led to a worldwide focus and progressive rise of human rights regime culminating in the establishments of international human rights laws and conventions.

The emphasis of transitional justice was on how abuses of human rights get treated during political transition: legal and criminal prosecution. As noted earlier, the universal conceptions of "justice" became the platform on which transitional justice was premised. The field in its early epistemology, thus, assumed jurisprudence of human rights. As a result, the initial literature on transitional justice was dominated by lawyers, law, and legal rights: defining laws, and processes on how to deal with human rights abuse and holding people accountable. Thus, transitional justice has its roots in both the human rights movement and in international human rights and humanitarian law. These origins in the human rights movement have rendered transitional justice "self-consciously victim-centric".

The late 1980s and early 1990s saw a shift in the focus of transitional justice. Informed by the worldwide wave of democratization, particularly the third wave, transitional justice reemerged as a new field of study in democratization. Transitional justice broadened its scope from more narrow questions of jurisprudence to political considerations of developing stable democratic institutions and renewing civil society. Studies by scholars on the transition from autocratic regimes to democratic ones have integrated the transitional justice framework into an examination of the political processes inherent to democratic change. The challenges of democratization in transitional periods are many: settling past accounts without derailing democratic progress, developing judicial or third-party fora capable of resolving conflicts, reparations, and creating memorials and developing educational curricula that redress cultural lacunae and unhealed trauma.

It is clear that elements of transitional justice have broken the initial mold of post-war jurisprudence. The transitional justice framework has benefited from democratic activists who sought to bolster fledgling democracies and bring them into line with the moral and legal obligations articulated in the international human rights consensus.

Canada, Australia, and New Zealand have used transitional justice approaches to address Indigenous oppression. Racial justice issues in the United States have been discussed using transitional justice language.

One particular innovation is the appearance of truth commissions. Beginning with Argentina in 1983, Chile in 1990, and South Africa in 1995, truth commissions have become a symbol of transitional justice, appearing in transitional societies in Latin America, Africa, Asia, and Eastern Europe. However, several attempts to create a regional truth commission in the former Yugoslavia (REKOM) have failed due to political obstacles. Recent years have also seen proposals for truth and reconciliation commissions in conflict zones of the Middle East: Israel and Palestine, Iraq, Lebanon, and the Kurdish regions.

Another major institutional innovation is the appearance of the variety of lustration programs in Central and Eastern Europe since the 1990s. While most countries pursued programs based on dismissals of compromised personnel and comprehensive screening tools, other countries implemented more inclusive methods allowing discredited personnel a second chance.

As a link between transition and justice, the concept of transitional justice transformed in the late 1940s to assume a broader perspective of comprehensive examination of the society in transition from a retrospective to a prospective position with democratic consolidation as one of the primary objectives. Scholars and practitioners of democratization have come to a common conclusion on the general principles of a transitional justice framework: that national strategies to confront past abuses, depending on the specific nature and context of the country in question, can contribute to accountability, an end to impunity, reconstruct state–citizen relations, and the creation of democratic institutions.

According to the International Center for Transitional Justice (ICTJ) and the international Task Force on Justice, an integral element of the Sustainable Development Goals (SDGs) includes the reduction of the "justice gap". The Working Group on Transitional Justice and SDG16+ said that "while the SDGs are universal", "massive and serious human rights violations create conditions in which extraordinary justice interventions are required to make progress toward sustainable peace and development."

== Definitions ==
According to the ICTJ, the term "transitional justice" was coined by various American academics in the 1990s to "describe the different ways that countries had approached the problems of new regimes coming to power faced with massive violations by their predecessors."

The ICTJ says that transitional justice "refers to the ways countries emerging from periods of conflict and repression address large-scale or systematic human rights violations so numerous and so serious that the normal justice system will not be able to provide an adequate response." Measures used include criminal prosecutions, truth commissions, reparations and restitution programs, exhumation of mass graves, apologies, amnesty, memorials, film, literature, scientific research, rewriting school textbooks, lustration and vetting, and various kinds of institutional reforms to redress human rights abuses.

Transitional justice represents a set of such extraordinary responses, often delivered during critical junctures such as transitions from war to peace or from authoritarianism to democracy. Transitional justice is meant to both redress gross violations and identify avenues to address the structural causes of those violations, such as gender inequality and social exclusion. While transitional justice includes criminal accountability, it is undergirded by a broader understanding of justice that takes into account a range of victim needs and societal priorities. Transitional justice is necessary so that the SDGs do not leave behind communities in countries that have experienced massive rights violations.

— ICTJ January 31, 2019

Transitional justice has, however, undergone conceptual changes since it was first coined. The 'transitional' prefix used to indicate a form of exceptionalism whereby justice processes support a political transition. Justice processes could violate or compromise the rule of law, if they safeguarded a transition to democracy. Due to the field's normalisation, justice came to mean ordinary justice in exceptional circumstances. As the UN High Commissioner for Human Rights explained in 2009, transitional justice is 'not a particular conception of justice, such as distributive or retributive justice' but is 'rather a technical approach to exceptional challenges'.

== Objectives ==
The primary objective of a transitional justice policy is to end the culture of impunity and establish the rule of law in a context of democratic governance. Transitional justice has roots in human rights protection and imputes certain humanitarian and justice obligations on states undergoing transitions. It challenges such societies to strive for a society where respect for human rights is the core and accountability is routinely practiced as the main goals. In the context of these goals, transitional justice aims at:

- Halting ongoing human rights abuses;
- Build social trust;
- Offer dignity to victims and their families;
- Investigating past crimes;
- Identifying those responsible for human rights violations;
- Imposing sanctions on those responsible (where it can);
- Providing reparations to victims;
- Preventing future abuses;
- Strengthen, remake, and reform state institutions;
- Security Sector Reform;
- Taking steps towards the establishment of positive peace
- Legitimize current state and in some cases de-legitimize the past state;
- Fostering individual and national reconciliation;
- Recognize victims as equal citizens;
- Acknowledging the past accurately;
- Help transition to a more just, equitable, peaceful, and democratic society.

In general, therefore, one can identify eight broad objectives that transitional justice aims to serve: establishing the truth, providing victims a public platform, holding perpetrators accountable, strengthening the rule of law, providing victims with compensation, effectuating institutional reform, promoting reconciliation, and promoting public deliberation.

== Strategies ==
Transitional Justice is a collection of processes used with the intention to create positive peace through methods of acknowledgement, restoration, criminal justice, and amnesties. In order to be effective, transitional justice measures should be part of a holistic approach. Some human rights abuses can result in criminal prosecutions, particularly the most serious ones. Investigations to seek the truth and fact-finding processes into human rights violations by non-judicial bodies include Truth Commissions. Reparation programs can be in the form of "individual, collective, material, and/or symbolic" reparations. As a result of investigations, convictions and/or investigations, new or reformed laws may be adopted and institutions reformed, including those related to the "police, judiciary, military, and military intelligence." In some cases there are efforts to memorialization of the abuses. Affirmative action policies are sometimes used to facilitate transition. Gender justice ensures women have equal access to the mechanisms.

== Mechanisms ==
The investigation and prosecution of serious international crimes, such as genocide, crimes against humanity, and war crimes helps to strengthen the rule of law by sanctioning those who violate laws with criminal penalties. It also demonstrates that crime will not be tolerated, and that human rights abusers will be held accountable for their actions. From its historical roots in the Nuremberg Trials, recent examples have included International Criminal Tribunal for Rwanda and International Criminal Tribunal for the former Yugoslavia, hybrid courts such as Special Court for Sierra Leone, Special Panels of the Dili District Court, Extraordinary Chambers in the Courts of Cambodia, Court of Bosnia and Herzegovina, and the establishment of the International Criminal Court (ICC), assuming a universal jurisdiction. The ICC and Hybrid Courts/Tribunals are key components of prosecution initiatives:

=== International Criminal Court ===
The International Criminal Court (ICC) was established by the Rome Statute in 1998. It is the first permanent international criminal court. It was established to investigate and try leaders of genocide, war crimes, and crimes against humanity in cases where countries are unable or unwilling to do so. The Rome Statute also established the Trust Fund for Victims to implement reparations and provide support for victims of war crimes and crimes against humanity tried by the ICC.

=== Hybrid courts and tribunals ===
Hybrid courts and tribunals have emerged as "third generation" courts established to investigate and prosecute human rights offenses. They follow the "first generation" Nuremberg and Tokyo tribunals and the "second generation" International Criminal Court and International Criminal Tribunals for the former Yugoslavia (ICTY) and Rwanda (ICTR). These courts consist of both international and domestic justice actors. They attempt to deliver justice that the domestic justice systems cannot provide alone due to lack of capacity or political will. Furthermore, hybrid courts attempt to strengthen domestic capacities to prosecute human rights abuses through the transfer of international legal skills and expertise. Examples include the Special Court for Sierra Leone and the Extraordinary Chambers in the Courts of Cambodia. The Gacaca for Rwanda was presented by the Rwandan authorities as being a hybrid system. The Special Jurisdiction for Peace in Colombia could also be considered one.

=== Reparations ===
Reparations aim to repair the suffering of victims of human rights abuses. They seek to make amends with victims, help them overcome the consequences of abuse, and provide rehabilitation. Reparations can fall along two axes, material or symbolic and individual or collective. Material reparations are the physical forms of reparations that are most commonly thought of such as money or the restoration of land. Symbolic reparations are the intangible forms reparations can take such as apologies, memorials, and commemorations. Individual reparations benefit individuals while collective reparations benefit the entire group who has suffered. They may include financial payments, social services including health care or education, or symbolic compensation such as public apologies.

==== Apologies ====
Apologies play a pivotal role in transitional justice processes by acknowledging historical injustices and fostering reconciliation within divided societies. They serve as symbolic gestures of accountability, validating the experiences of victims and survivors. Moreover, apologies contribute to the restoration of trust in institutions, paving the way for societal healing and the prevention of future conflicts. One example is the Canadian government's apology "Statement of Reconciliation" to indigenous Canadian families for removing their children and placing them in church-run Indian Residential Schools. The Canadian government also created a $350 million fund to help those affected by the schools.

=== Truth-seeking ===
Truth-seeking encompasses initiatives allowing actors in a country to investigate past abuses and seek redress for victims. These processes aim to enable societies to examine and come to terms with past crimes and human rights violations in order to prevent their recurrence. They help create documentation that prevents repressive regimes from rewriting history and denying the past. They can also help victims obtain closure by knowing the truth about what actually happened (such as to "disappeared" people) and understanding the atrocities they endured. Truth-seeking measures may include freedom of information legislation, declassification of archives, investigations, and truth commissions.

==== Truth commissions ====
Truth commissions are non-judicial commissions of inquiry that aim to discover and reveal past abuses by a government or non-state actors; about forty official truth commissions have been created worldwide. One example is the Truth and Reconciliation Commission in South Africa, which was established to help overcome apartheid and reconcile tensions in the country. Another example is the Truth and Reconciliation Commission of Canada which was created as part of a settlement with the survivors of the Canadian Indian Residential School System.

=== Memory and memorials ===
Memorials seek to preserve memories of people or events. In the context of transitional justice, they serve to honor those who died during conflict or other atrocities, examine the past, address contemporary issues and show respect to victims. They can help create records to prevent denial and help societies move forward. Memorials may include commemoration activities, such as architectural memorials, museums, and other commemorative events. One example includes the monuments, annual prayer ceremony, and mass grave in northern Uganda, created in response to the war conducted by and against the Lord's Resistance Army there. Another example is Fragmentos, an abstract memorial created by Doris Salcedo alongside the survivors of sexual abuse from the Colombian Conflict. It consists of 1,296 tiles made from 37 tons of melted down metal from the weapons of 13,000 former guerilla fighters to memorialize the peace agreement between the government of Colombia and FARC.

=== Institutional reform ===
Public institutions, including the police, military, and judiciary, often contribute to repression and other human rights violations. When societies undergo a transition, these institutions must be reformed in order to create accountability and prevent the recurrence of abuse. Institutional reform includes the process of restructuring these state actors to ensure that they respect human rights and abide by the rule of law.

Reforms can include measures such as vetting, lustration, and Disarmament, Demobilization and Reintegration (DDR). Vetting is the process of eliminating corrupt or abusive officials from public service employment. For instance, in Afghanistan, election candidates in the 2009 and 2010 elections were vetted. While similar to lustration, "vetting" is the broader category referring to processes aimed at screening and excluding human rights abusers from public institutions while "lustration" refers specifically to the vetting processes and laws that were implemented in the former communist countries in Eastern and Central Europe after the end of the Cold War. Vetting does not necessarily imply dismissals from the state apparatus. Several countries developed alternative personnel systems that provide for the inclusion of inherited personnel in exchange for their exposure or confession. DDR programs assist ex‑combatants in rejoining society.

One example of institutional reform is the removal of court officials involved in crimes of the fallen Tunisian regime. Under Ben Ali's rule, courts often facilitated corruption. The removal of implicated officials is a part of the government's efforts to reconcile this abuse.

== Trends and challenges ==
States in times of transition to democracy, since the early 1980s, have been using a variety of transitional justice mechanisms as part of measures to account for the past and build a future democratic state. Mechanisms, such as trials, truth commissions, reparations, lustration, museums, and other memory sites have been employed either single-handedly or in a combined form to address past human rights violations. Diverse studies ranging from the decision-making process of a choice of strategy through to the implementation of the transitional justice policy and impacts on the transition and future stability of the society in question have been produced by scholars in recent years.

One illuminating study in particular that has documented the dramatic new trend of transitional justice and democratization is by Kathryn Sikkink and Carrie Booth Walling (2006). In their research paper described as the "justice cascade", Sikkink and Walling conducting analysis of truth commissions and human rights trials occurring throughout the world from 1979 to 2004 revealed a significant increase in the judicialization of world politics both regionally and internationally. Of the 192 countries surveyed, 34 have used truth commissions, and 50 had at least one transitional human rights trial.

More than two-thirds of the approximately 85 new and/or transitional countries during that period used either trials or truth commissions as a transitional justice mechanism; over half tried some form of judicial proceedings. Thus, the use of a truth commission and/or human rights trials among transitional countries is not an isolated or marginal practice, but a widespread social practice occurring in the bulk of transitional countries.

Since its emergence, transitional justice has encountered numerous challenges such as identifying victims, deciding the extent to which to punish superiors or middle agents, avoiding a "victor's justice", and finding adequate resources for compensation, trial, or institutional reform. Also, the transitional period may only result in a tenuous peace or fragile democracy.

As has been noted in the discourse on transition to democracy, the dilemma has always been for new regimes to promote accountability for past abuses without risking a smooth transition to democracy. In addition, the existing judicial system might be weak, corrupt, or ineffective, and in effect make achieving any viable justice difficult.

Observers of transitional justice application and processes, such as Makau W. Mutua (2000), have emphasized the difficulties of achieving actual justice through one of the most prominent mechanisms of transitional justice, criminal trials. Commenting on the International Criminal Tribunal for Rwanda that was established in 1994, he argued that it "serves to deflect responsibility, to assuage the consciences of states which were unwilling to stop the genocide... [and] largely masks the illegitimacy of the Tutsi regime". In sum, Matua argues that criminal tribunals such as those in Rwanda and Yugoslavia are "less meaningful if they cannot be applied or enforced without prejudice to redress transgressions or unless they have a deterrent effect such as behavior modification on the part of would be perpetrators".

More recently, Lyal S. Sunga has argued that unless truth commissions are set up and conducted according to international human rights law, international criminal law and international humanitarian law, they risk conflicting or undermining criminal prosecutions, whether these prosecutions are supposed to be carried out at the national or international levels. He contends that this risk is particularly pronounced where truth commissions employ amnesties, and especially blanket amnesties to pardon perpetrators of serious crimes. On the other hand, criminal prosecutions should be better tailored to focus on victims and to place events in proper perspective. Sunga therefore proposes ten principles for making truth and national reconciliation commissions fully complementary to criminal prosecutions in a way that conforms fully to international law.

This type of critique of transitional justice mechanisms might cause some scholars and policymakers to wonder which of the objectives outlined above are most important to achieve, and even the extent to which they are achievable. Truth commissions could be characterized as a second-best alternative and also an affront to rule of law, because of the possibility that amnesty and indemnities will be made exchange for truth. These sets of challenges can raise critical questions for transitional justice in its application. Questions and issues, such as: Can the "truth" ever really be established? Can all victims be given compensation or a public platform? Can all perpetrators be held accountable? Or is it sufficient to acknowledge that atrocities were committed and that victims should be compensated for their suffering?

Also, one might argue that too narrow a focus on the challenges of the field runs the risk of making transitional justice seem meaningless. However transitional justice aims at an ongoing search for truth, justice, forgiveness, and healing, and efforts undertaken within it help people to live alongside former enemies. Simply put, "the past must be addressed in order to reach the future". Thus, even if the impact or reach of transitional justice seems marginal, the end result is worth the effort.

Another way of assessing attempts at transitional justice is to say that decision makers may have less control over the methods used to pursue such policies than they imagine. In fact, whatever their wishes, they may not be able to prevent such policies at all. As A. James McAdams has demonstrated in his book, Judging the Past in Unified Germany (2001), West German policymakers such as former chancellor Helmut Kohl wanted to close public access to the files of East Germany's secret police, the Stasi, but pressures from East German dissidents prevented them from doing so.

Another challenge is the tension between peace and justice, which arises from the conflicting goals of achieving peace and justice in the aftermath of a society's emergence from conflict. Though it is generally acknowledged that both goals are integral to achieving reconciliation, practitioners often disagree about which goal should be pursued first: justice or peace? Proponents of the "justice" school of thought argue that if all perpetrators of human rights abuses do not stand trial, impunity for crimes will continue into the new regime, preventing it from fully completing a transition from conflict. The "peace" school of thought, however, argues that the only way to effectively end violence is by granting amnesties and brokering negotiations to persuade criminals to lay down their arms. Examples such as Northern Ireland illustrate how selective amnesties can cease conflict. Moreover, empirical research demonstrates that the level of a justice intervention affects the conditions of possibility for a negotiated solution to end civil war.

Recent trends in the post-conflict field have tended to favor the "justice" school of thought, maintaining that only if justice is dutifully served to victims of the conflict can civil war will be prevented from recurring. A 2011 debate in The Economist determined in its concluding polls that 76% of the debate participants agreed with the motion that achieving peace can occur only through implementing justice mechanisms.

=== Literary applications ===
Literary scholars and historians have begun to use the concept of transitional justice to reexamine historical events and texts. Christopher N. Warren, for instance, has applied transitional justice to pre-Restoration England, claiming that it helps explain how Anglican royalists convinced Presbyterians to assent to a restoration of the monarchy. Warren also argues that English poet John Milton "can be seen as an early critic of transitional justice," using the allegory of Sin and Death in his epic poem Paradise Lost to complicate "overly-rosy" depictions of transitional justice.

== Future agenda ==
Transitional justice has become a feature of transitional politics in the 21st century. Policies, tools, and programs used in peacebuilding and the democratization process have been studied and researched, creating a stronger discourse around them. Many organizations utilize these tools including:

- The United Nations (UN)
- Stockholm-based International Institute for Electoral Assistance and Democracy (International IDEA)
- International Center for Transitional Justice (ICTJ)
- Institute for Justice and Reconciliation (IJR)
- Transitional Justice Institute African Transitional Justice Research Network (ATJRN)

Academic publications such as the International Journal of Transitional Justice are also contributing towards building an interdisciplinary field.

=== Challenges ===
The effectiveness of transitional justice is difficult to measure. The unique challenges any given country or region faces should be evaluated carefully. To avoid causing disappointment amongst victims, the state should ensure that the public is well-informed about the goals and limits of a set of actions.

Sikkink and Walling's comparison of human rights conditions before and after trials in Latin American countries with two or more trial years showed that eleven of the fourteen countries had better Political Terror Scale (PTS) ratings after trials. Latin American countries that had both a truth commission and human rights trials improved more on their PTS ratings than countries that only had trials. These statistics indicate that transitional justice mechanisms are associated with countries' improving their human rights practices.

The World Bank's "2011 World Development Report on Conflict, Security, and Development" links transitional justice to security and development. It explores how countries can avoid cycles of violence and argues that transitional justice is one of the "signaling mechanisms" that governments can use to show that they are breaking away from past practices. These measures can send signals about the importance of accountability and to improve institutional capacity.

=== Areas of Concern ===
Many toolkits, publications, manuals, and workshops have been developed to address transitional justice. This has led to concerns that the field of transitional justice has become standardised. Given the field's emphasis of context-sensitive justice processes, this may lead to superficial results.

In September 2011, the International Center for Transitional Justice (ICTJ) published a report advocating the need to understand traditional transitional justice measures from a child's perspective. The report identifies children as a large demographic often excluded from this process.

== Major cases ==
- Loayza–Tamayo v. Peru, 1998 Inter-Am. Ct. H.R. (ser. C) No. 42 (November 27, 1998)
- Garrido and Baigorria v. Argentina, 1998 Inter-Am. Ct. H.R. (ser. C) No. 39, 72 (August 27, 1998)
- Moiwana Community v. Suriname, 2005 Inter-Am. Ct. H.R. (ser. C) No. 124, 100 (June 15, 2005)

== See also ==
- Conciliation Resources
- Ex post facto law
- Nazis and Nazi Collaborators (Punishment) Law
- Pact of Forgetting
- Restorative justice
- Universal justice
- Vergangenheitsbewältigung

== Bibliography ==
- Aertsen, Ivo; Arsovska, Jana; Rohne, Holger-C.; et al., eds. (2008). Restoring justice after large-scale violent conflicts: Kosovo, DR Congo and the Israeli-Palestinian case. William Publishing. ISBN 978-1-84392-302-2.
- Daniele Archibugi and Alice Pease, Crime and Global Justice: The Dynamics of International Punishment, Cambridge: Polity Press, 2018. ISBN 978-1-5095-1262-1
- Bickford, Louis N. (2005), "Transitional Justice," in The Encyclopedia of Genocide and Crimes Against Humanity Vol. 3 (Macmillan Library Reference), ISBN 978-0-02-865848-3
- Brechtken, Magnus; Bułhak, Władysław; Zarusky, Jürgen, eds. (2019): Political and transitional justice in Germany, Poland and the Soviet Union from the 1930s to the 1950s. Göttingen: Wallstein Göttingen, 2019
- Cobban, Helena (2007). Amnesty after Atrocity: Healing Nations after Genocide and War Crimes. Boulder, CO: Paradigm Publishers. ISBN 978-1-59451-316-9. The final chapter of this book is available online at "Restoring Peacemaking, Revaluing History".
- David, Roman. Lustration and Transitional Justice, Philadelphia: Pennsylvania University Press, 2011.
- Gissel, Line Engbo (2022). "The Standardisation of Transitional Justice." European Journal of International Relations 28(4), pp. 859–884.
- Kritz, Neil, ed. (1995). Transitional Justice: How Emerging Democracies Reckon with Former Regimes, Vols. I–III. Washington, D.C.: U.S. Institute of Peace Press.
- McAdams, A. James (2001). "Judging the Past in Unified Germany." New York, NY: Cambridge University Press.
- Martin, Arnaud, ed. (2009). La mémoire et le pardon. Les commissions de la vérité et de la réconciliation en Amérique latine. Paris: L'Harmattan.
- Mendez, Juan E. (1997). "Accountability for Past Abuses." Human Rights Quarterly 19:255.
- Mouralis, Guillaume (2014). "The Invention of "Transitional Justice" in the 1990s". In Dealing with Wars and Dictatorships, ed. Liora Israël and Guillaume Mouralis, The Hague: Springer / Asser Press, pp 83–100.
- Murithi, Tim (2016). The Politics of Transitional Justice in the Great Lakes Region. Johannesburg: Jacana Media.
- Furtado, Henrique T. (2022). Politics of Impunity: Torture, the Armed Forces and the Failure of Justice in Brazil. Edinburgh: Edinburgh University Press
- Nino, Carlos S. (1996). Radical Evil on Trial. New Haven, Conn.: Yale University Press
- Omondi, Elias & Tim Murithi (2022). Elections, Violence and Transitional Justice in Africa. London: Routledge.
- Osiel, Mark J. (1997). Mass Atrocity, Collective Memory, and the Law. New Brunswick, N.J.: Transaction Publishers.
- Lavinia Stan, ed., Transitional Justice in Eastern Europe and the Former Soviet Union: Reckoning with the Communist Past, London: Routledge, 2009.
- Simić, Oliveira (2016). An Introduction to Transitional Justice, Routledge.
- Teitel, Ruti (2000). Transitional Justice, Oxford University Press.
- Zalaquett, Jose (1993). "Introduction to the English Edition." In Chilean National Commission on Truth and Reconciliation: Report of the Chilean National Commission on Truth and Reconciliation, trans. Phillip E. Berryman. South Bend, Ind.: University of Notre Dame Press.
