= Impunity =

Ability to not be punished or face legal consequences

Impunity is the ability to act with exemption from punishments, losses, or other negative consequences. In the international law of human rights, impunity is failure to bring perpetrators of human rights violations to justice and, as such, itself constitutes a denial of the victims' right to justice and redress. Impunity is especially common in countries which lack the tradition of rule of law, or suffer from pervasive corruption, or contain entrenched systems of patronage, or where the judiciary is weak or members of the security forces are protected by special jurisdictions or immunities. Impunity is sometimes considered a form of denialism of historical crimes.

== Examples ==
The Armenian genocide was fueled by impunity for the perpetrators of earlier massacres of Armenians, such as the 1890s Hamidian massacres. After the genocide, the Treaty of Sèvres required Turkey to allow the return of refugees and enable them to recover their properties. However, Turkey did not allow the return of refugees and nationalized all Armenian properties. A secret annex to the Treaty of Lausanne granted immunity to the perpetrators of the Armenian genocide and put an end to the effort to prosecute Ottoman war criminals. Hardly anyone was prosecuted for the systematic murder of hundreds of thousands of Armenians. According to historian Stefan Ihrig, the failure to intervene and hold perpetrators accountable made the genocide the "double original sin" of the twentieth century.

== Human rights principles ==
The amended Set of Principles for the Protection and Promotion of Human Rights Through Action to Combat Impunity, submitted to the United Nations Commission on Human Rights on 8 February 2005, defines impunity as:

the impossibility, de jure or de facto, of bringing the perpetrators of violations to account – whether in criminal, civil, administrative or disciplinary proceedings – since they are not subject to any inquiry that might lead to their being accused, arrested, tried and, if found guilty, sentenced to appropriate penalties, and to making reparations to their victims.

The First Principle of that same document states that:

Impunity arises from a failure by States to meet their obligations to investigate violations; to take appropriate measures in respect of the perpetrators, particularly in the area of justice, by ensuring that those suspected of criminal responsibility are prosecuted, tried and duly punished; to provide victims with effective remedies and to ensure that they receive reparation for the injuries suffered; to ensure the inalienable right to know the truth about violations; and to take other necessary steps to prevent a recurrence of violations.

Truth commissions are frequently established by nations emerging from periods marked by human rights violations – coups d'état, military dictatorships, civil wars, etc. – in order to cast light on the events of the past. While such mechanisms can assist in the ultimate prosecution of crimes and punishment of the guilty, they have often been criticised for perpetuating impunity by enabling violators to seek protection of concurrently adopted amnesty laws.

The primary goal of the Rome Statute of the International Criminal Court, adopted on 17 July 1998 and entered into force on 1 July 2002, is "to put an end to impunity for the perpetrators" [...] "of the most serious crimes of concern to the international community as a whole".

== See also ==
- Anti-impunity
- Appeasement
- Blackstone's ratio
- Command responsibility
- Corruption
- Error of impunity
- Gypsy cop
- International Criminal Court
- International Day to End Impunity for Crimes against Journalists
- International humanitarian law
- International law
- Legal immunity
- Miscarriage of justice
- Priest shuffling
- Ratlines
- Realpolitik
- Rendition (law)
