= Norodom Sihamoni =

King of Cambodia since 2004

- Preah Boromneath
- Majesty King Norodom Sihamoni

King of Cambodia
- Reign: 14 October 2004 – present
- Coronation: 29 October 2004
- Predecessor: Chea Sim (as Acting Head of State); Norodom Sihanouk (as King)
- Born: 14 May 1953 (age 73); Phnom Penh, Cambodia, French Indochina
- House: Norodom
- Father: Norodom Sihanouk
- Mother: Norodom Monineath
- Religion: Theravada Buddhism
- Education: Academy of Performing Arts in Prague
- Website: Official website

Modern kings of Cambodia
- Ang Duong
- Norodom
- Sisowath
- Sisowath Monivong
- Norodom Sihanouk (first reign)
- Norodom Suramarit
- Sisowath Kossamak (ceremonial queen)
- Norodom Sihanouk (second reign)
- Norodom Sihamoni

Norodom Sihamoni (Khmer: នរោត្តម សីហមុនី, Nôrotdâm Soeihămŭni, [nɔˈroːɗɑm səjˈhamoniː]; born 14 May 1953) is King of Cambodia.

A member of the House of Norodom, Sihamoni is the eldest son of King Norodom Sihanouk and Queen Norodom Monineath. He was educated in Czechoslovakia and gained recognition for his work as a cultural ambassador in Europe and as a classical ballet instructor during his princely years. Before his election as king, he served as Cambodia's ambassador to the United Nations and UNESCO.

He ascended to the throne on 14 October 2004, a week after the abdication of his father, Norodom Sihanouk. During his reign, Sihamoni has continued his cultural advocacy while supporting various philanthropic initiatives, balancing his role as a constitutional monarch amid Cambodia's political developments.

== Early life ==
=== Birth, name and family ===
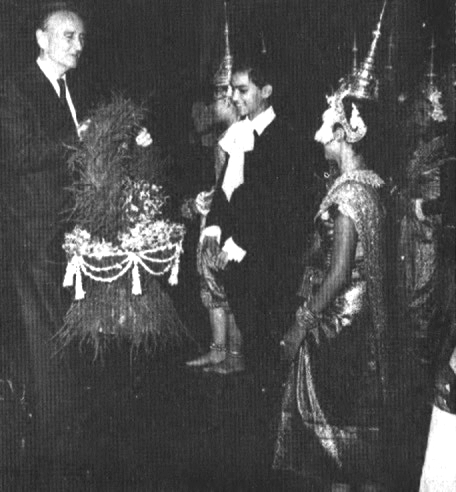
Prince Sihamoni with his half-sister Princess Norodom Buppha Devi receiving a bouquet of flowers from US Senator Mike Mansfield in 1969.

Sihamoni was born on Thursday 14 May 1953, in Phnom Penh, Cambodia, when it was still a colonial protectorate within French Indochina. The prince's birth at the time was viewed as a positive omen as Cambodia gained independence from France later in that year.

His given name "Sihamoni" comprises two morphemes from his parents' given names "Sihanouk" and "Monineath". As for "Norodom", this means Narottam in Pali and Prakrit, which translates to "the best amongst men". The name has a similar meaning in Khmer as well.

At the time of his birth and that of his younger brother, his mother Princess Monique who is of Khmer, French and Corsican descent, had been one of King Norodom Sihanouk's consorts after being a constant companion since the day they met in 1951 when she won first prize in a national beauty contest. The queen was granted the title of Neak Moneang and the name of Monineath at the time of her marriage to King Norodom Sihanouk in 1952. Furthermore, Queen Monineath is a step-granddaughter of the late Prince Norodom Duong Chakr of Cambodia, and the daughter of Pomme Peang and of her second husband, Jean-François Izzi, a Corsican banker.

Sihamoni has 14 half-brothers and half-sisters from his father; his only full sibling, a younger brother, Samdech Norodom Narindrapong, was born in 1954 and died in 2003.

=== Education and life abroad ===
The then-Prince Sihamoni first began his education in 1959, where he attended Norodom School, followed by Lycée Descartes School in Phnom Penh, developing a keen interest in the arts early on in his life.

In 1962, the young Sihamoni was sent to Prague in Czechoslovakia by his father to study abroad. There, he completed his early education at Majakovský Primary School and later at Ostrovni Elementary School. When he was in his preadolescence years, he starred in a production of Pyotr Tchaikovsky's The Nutcracker at the prestigious Prague National Theatre, where he pursued private ballet and piano classes and was once even selected for a television rendition of Brundibár, a well-known children's opera. He then concluded his secondary education at the National Prague Conservatory and was regarded as an able student, getting high marks. Here, he further developed his interest in the performing arts, undertaking courses in this field and excelling at the top of his class. Furthermore, he attained great fluency in Czech. A movie directed by Vladimír Sís was shot about the prince in Prague in 1967, under the name The Other Little Prince (Jiný malý princ). The prince would occasionally visit his homeland for holidays of which when he did, he involved himself in Cambodia's arts and cultural scene, including starring in a film made by his father and performing ballet. During the 1970 coup d'état by Lon Nol that saw Sihanouk removed from power and a Khmer Republic being proclaimed, exacerbating the Cambodian Civil War, Sihamoni remained in Czechoslovakia.

Between 1971 and 1975, Sihamoni completed his higher education in classical dance and music at the Academy of Performing Arts in Prague, culminating with the attainment of a Master's degree for which he wrote a thesis titled The Conception and Administration of Artistic Schools in Cambodia. After graduation in 1975, he left Prague and began to study filmmaking in North Korea at the National Academy of Cinematography in Pyongyang.

=== Return to Cambodia ===
The fall of Phnom Penh on 17 April 1975 led to the demise of the Khmer Republic and the creation of Democratic Kampuchea by the Khmer Rouge who oversaw a brutal campaign of genocide. In the following year of 1976, Sihamoni was forced to come back to Cambodia after having been deceived by the Khmer Rouge with a forged telegram, undersigned by King Sihanouk ordering his return. Immediately, the ruling Khmer Rouge regime headed by Pol Pot turned against the monarchy, and put the royal family including Sihamoni, his brother Prince Norodom Narindrapong, his mother Queen Norodom Monineath, his father King Norodom Sihanouk under house arrest in the Royal Palace. The consequent Cambodian genocide saw several members of the wider royal family killed and Sihamoni and his immediate family lived in daily fear for their lives, effectively shut off from the outside world. Throughout their period of house arrest, the prince recounted how they were prohibited from making contact with anyone and were barred from having any staff. The Khmer Rouge soldiers would give them food consisting of rice and fish that was limited to two times a week and they had to, for the most part, cultivate their food from the palace gardens. With the Cambodian–Vietnamese War, which resulted in the ousting of the Khmer Rouge in 1979 and the establishment of the Vietnamese installed People's Republic of Kampuchea, the family, aided by the Chinese government, was airlifted to China. Sihamoni subsequently worked as a secretary for his father who spearheaded a resistance movement in response to the Vietnamese occupation.

=== Career ===
In 1981, Sihamoni moved to France to teach ballet as a professor of classical dance and artistic pedagogy, a position which he held for almost two decades, at various conservatoires, including the Marius Petipa Conservatory, the Gabriel Faure Conservatory and the W.A. Mozart Conservatory. He was also later president of the Khmer Dance Association there. He lived in France for nearly 20 years and continued his pursuit in the arts, establishing 'Ballet Deva', an original dance troupe, in which he served as its General Manager and Artistic Director, alongside heading the Royal Khmer Cinematic Corporation. In his line of work, he placed emphasis on giving opportunities for men to feature more prominently in traditional Khmer dance where they are often not assigned leading roles when he created "Duel", a unique ballet style inspired by the Russian ballet. During this overseas period, for a time, he also entered into the monkhood under the auspices of Samdech Bour Kry, who would later become a supreme patriarch of Cambodia.

In the early 1990s, Cambodia's Supreme National Council, which was recognized by United Nations Security Council Resolution 668 as part of the transitional process in the country under the 1991 Paris Peace Agreements, unanimously selected Prince Sihamoni in 1992 as its permanent representative to the United Nations, which he served until 1993. That same year of 1993 saw the restoration of the monarchy, with Sihanouk returning as King and the prince being appointed as Cambodia's permanent representative to UNESCO in Paris, a role he held right until he became King in 2004. In this role, Sihamoni became known for his hard work and devotion to Cambodian culture as seen by his advocacy for the international recognition of Khmer classical ballet and shadow theatre as an intangible cultural heritage. He had previously refused an appointment as Cambodia's ambassador to France. In October 2003, he was additionally appointed as a High Privy Counselor to then-King Norodom Sihanouk.

== Reign ==
=== Accession and coronation ===
On 14 October 2004, Sihamoni was chosen as monarch by the Royal Council of the Throne, a special nine-member constitutional body that is tasked with electing the King of Cambodia. This selection process was quickly put into place after the surprise abdication of King Norodom Sihanouk the week before. At that time, there were no provisions in the nation's constitution that covered the subject of abdication. Prince Sihamoni's selection was endorsed by Prime Minister Hun Sen and the then National Assembly President Prince Norodom Ranariddh (Sihamoni's half-brother), both members of the throne council. King Sihanouk backed the decision as well. A few years before his selection, there was speculation about potential succession after he was seen deputizing on Sihanouk's behalf at official functions despite him being rarely seen in public, although much of the initial speculation focused on Ranariddh who was the preferred choice of his parents, but who ultimately expressed disinterest in acceding to the throne. Sihamoni was said to have been reluctant to take on the stately role, but nevertheless accepted it in the national interest, returning on 20 October to Phnom Penh, accompanied by his parents, King-Father Norodom Sihanouk and Queen-Mother Norodom Monineath, to an estimated 100,000 people who lined their motorcade route from Phnom Penh International Airport to the Royal Palace to welcome the soon-to-be King.

Then-Prince Sihamoni's accession to the throne was reflected upon by journalist Michael Sheridan of The Sunday Times whom on 17 October 2004 remarked:

The extraordinary story of the aesthete who flies home this week to become king of Cambodia — and of the men who nearly had him killed — can be summed up for most people in the capital, Phnom Penh by the tale of two buildings on the banks of the Mekong River. One is the glorious golden-roofed royal palace, gaily illuminated by hundreds of festive lights in celebration of the announcement that the bachelor prince, Norodom Sihamoni, is to succeed his father King Norodom Sihanouk... Within its walls, father and son endured captivity at the hands of the Khmer Rouge, not knowing from day to day whether the revolutionaries might order their murder. The other building is the concrete 1950s Chaktamuk theatre, nearby, where the surviving members of the Khmer Rouge regime, most now frail old men, are expected to face trial for genocide before an internationally funded tribunal. Two momentous dramas in Cambodia's modern history – the chequered rule of King Sihanouk and the [Khmer Rouge's] blood-drenched attempt to create a Marxist utopia – are therefore drawing to a close at the same time.

Sheridan's reflection captured the symbolism of the moment in Cambodia's monarchical transition as these two indelible chapters etched into its national story; the undisputed significance of King Sihanouk's influential rule and the undeniably traumatic genocidal rule of the Khmer Rouge are juxtaposed with one another as the country entered a new historical era under the reign of King Sihamoni.

He was then inaugurated and formally appointed as King on 29 October 2004 in a coronation ceremony centered at the Royal Palace in the capital. The coronation was noted for its relative simplicity, which was specifically requested by King-Father Sihanouk. King Sihamoni himself did not want the ceremonies to be too lavish because he did not wish for the impoverished country to spend too much money on the event, opting for a more modest affair. In a break with precedent, Sihamoni did not assume his seat on the higher, elevated throne nor did he wear the gold-and-diamond monarchial crown that came with the royal regalia.

In his first public speech as monarch, he acknowledged words of wisdom imparted to him by his father and pledged to be a king of the people by saying:

My august father, at the very moment of my election as King of Cambodia by the highly respected Throne Council, said to me... 'it is by being in contact with the people and the realities of the country that one learns how to become more and more capable of serving, defending and developing Cambodia and the Cambodian nation.' My respected and beloved compatriots, I will always be your faithful and devoted servant. I will never live apart from my beloved people. The Royal House will remain a transparent house and for me there will never be an ivory tower.

— King Norodom Sihamoni

In the first six months after his coronation, Sihamoni ensured to pay regular visits to his fellow Cambodians, especially those in the provinces and countryside, including occasionally making surprise visits. He was praised by observers for "being close to the people and having a gentle touch", though they also noted he still needed time to independently carve out his role as monarch amid the influential role of his father, former King Sihanouk, notwithstanding his abdication.

On 29 October 2014, there were celebrations to mark the 10th anniversary of his coronation. Well-wishers representing different cross sections of the kingdom's population congregated outside the royal palace to commemorate the occasion and pay their respects to the King.

=== Privy advisory council ===
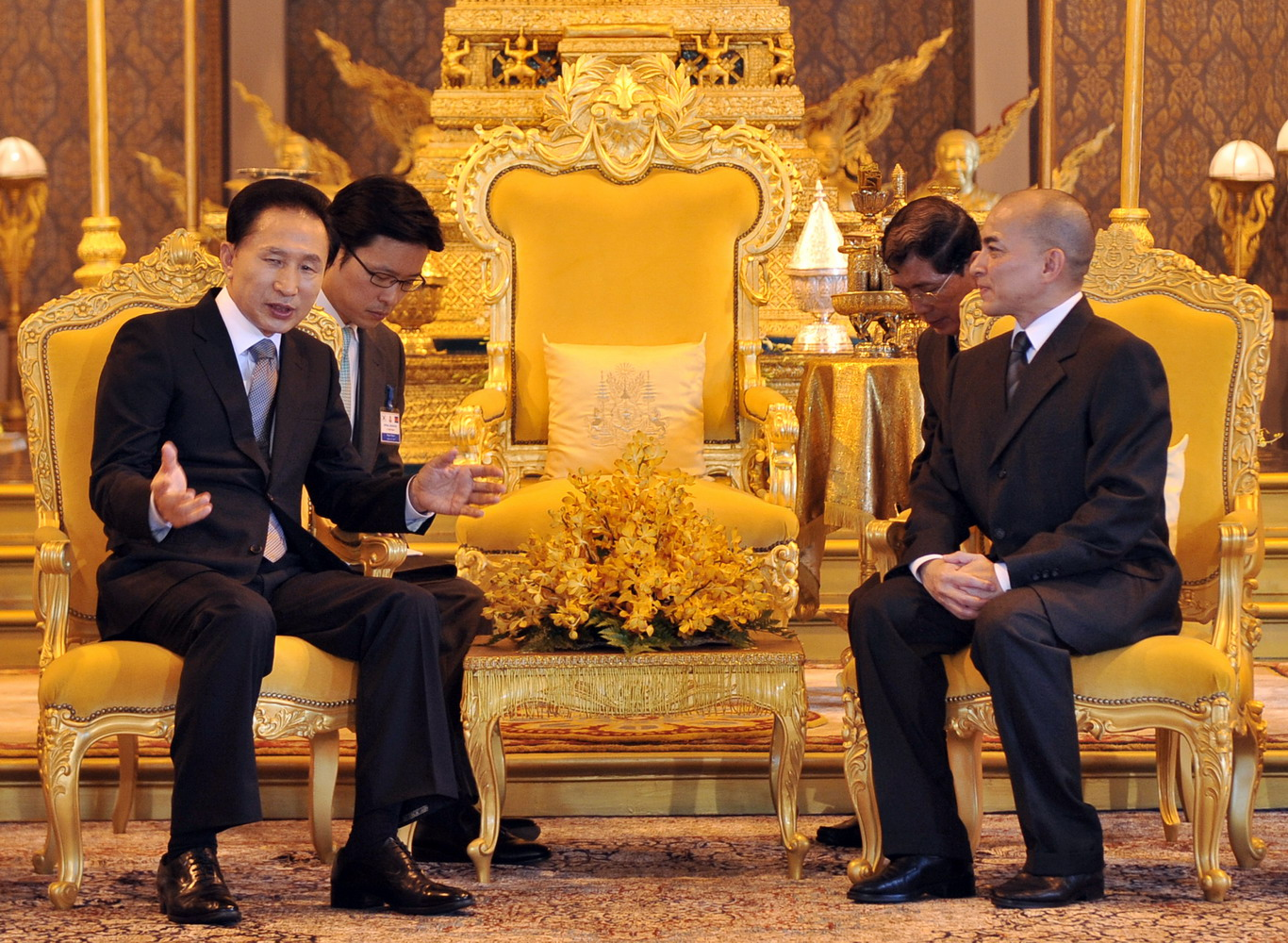
King Sihamoni meeting with South Korean president Lee Myung-bak in the Throne Hall of the Royal Palace in 2009.

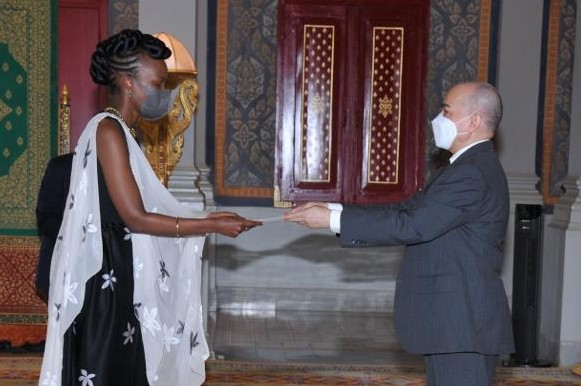
Rwandan Ambassador to Cambodia Yasmin D. Amri Sued presents her letter of credence to King Sihamoni in 2022.

On 12 December 2008, it was reported that Sihamoni had selected twenty-six members of the Cambodian royal family to his advisory court, among them his half-brother and former Prime Minister Prince Norodom Ranariddh as chief advisor and president of the council. Other choices included Prince Sisowath Sirirath, Princess Norodom Marie (estranged wife of Prince Ranariddh) and Prince Sisowath Thomico. The King's half-sister and Cambodia's former Ambassador to Malaysia, Princess Norodom Arunrasmy and uncle, Prince Norodom Sirivudh serve as members on the council as well.

As royalism has long been a staple in Cambodian political history, with periods where royalist parties had once governed the country, such as the Sangkum of then-Prince Sihanouk in the 1950s and 1960s and the FUNCINPEC party of Prince Ranariddh in the 1990s, the appointments was seen at the time by observers as signaling the cessation of royal family members participating in politics. This was because theoretically, the constitution did not allow individuals to concurrently serve in both the royal court and government. Responding to the commentary, some ruling party officials and members of the royal family insisted that there was no agenda behind the move and that it should not be construed as the prohibition or end of royal political involvement, despite the influence and electoral success of royalist political parties having waned significantly over time.

In late July 2023, upon the resignation of Prime Minister Hun Sen, it was announced that the King would appoint him to take up the position as head of the council, succeeding Ranariddh who had died in 2021. This coincided with the announcement that National Assembly President Heng Samrin, Interior Minister Sar Kheng, Defence Minister Tea Banh, and National Assembly-Senate Relations and Inspection Minister Men Sam An, the latter three of whom concurrently served as Deputy Prime Ministers, would also be appointed as privy counsellors once they had relinquished their respective positions. The appointments came into effect later in the following month.

On 4 September 2023, the King made additional appointments to the council that included former Foreign Minister Hor Namhong and former Supreme Court President Dith Munty. In January 2024, former Cambodian military leader Meas Sophea was also appointed to the council. This was followed by the appointments of former Senate President Say Chhum and former Senate First and Second Vice Presidents Sim Ka and Tep Ngorn in March 2024.

=== Political role ===
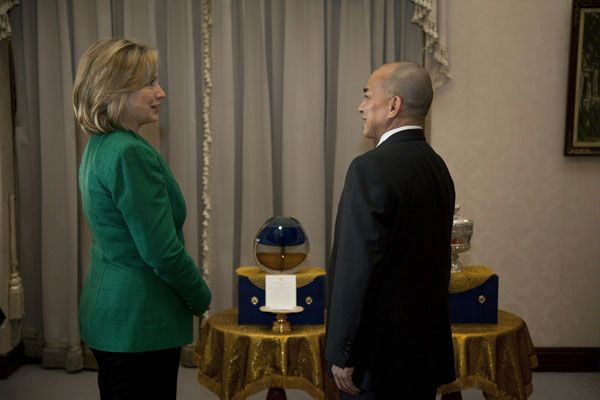
US Secretary of State Hillary Clinton with King Sihamoni in 2010.

The King has limited political powers and rarely gets involved in the Cambodian political space, in conformance with his position as a constitutional monarch, and is considered to be 'above politics'. Some Cambodian opposition figures, however, have called for him to be more vocal and directly involved in the political issues of the country, like his predecessor, King-father Norodom Sihanouk was, contending that the King has the constitutional prerogative to do so, in terms of powers accorded to him. Conversely, others have cautioned against this notion, citing that the constitution strictly warrants for a predominantly ceremonial monarch that "shall reign but shall not govern", noting that resorting to political intervention is neither in the long-term interests of the monarchy nor nation, and Sihamoni, since the outset of his reign, has pledged and adhered to a largely apolitical stance. Indeed, during the monarchical selection process, King Sihanouk touted then Prince Sihamoni's neutral and impartial approach to politics as a key trait for why he is suited to the role. This is reinforced by analysis from observers that Sihamoni "has represented both continuity and change — withdrawing royalty from active politics, but advancing it as a symbol of national reconciliation", thereby restoring the "monarchy's traditional role as an 'umbrella' under which Cambodians could unite." In turn, observers argue that this limits any politicization of the monarchy as an institution whilst maintaining its neutrality as well as legitimacy, especially amid the context of the sometimes controversial and turbulent nature of Cambodian politics.

==== Bilateral border dispute ====
Nevertheless, there have been several occasions where Sihamoni's reluctance to be involved in the political arena have been tested. In 2005, in the first major political challenge of his reign, it was reported that he was hesitant to authorize the royal assent for the government's plans to give effect to a controversial border treaty with neighbouring Vietnam, which was compounded by his predecessor, King-father Sihanouk's objection. This caused tension with the government after Prime Minister Hun Sen expressed frustration about the royal assent delay to the point that abolition of the monarchy was suggested. Sihamoni eventually signed the treaty, after having been assured by government and legislative officials as well as other members of the royal family, that no land would be ceded to Vietnam as a result of the promulgation of the bilateral treaty.

==== Political pardons ====
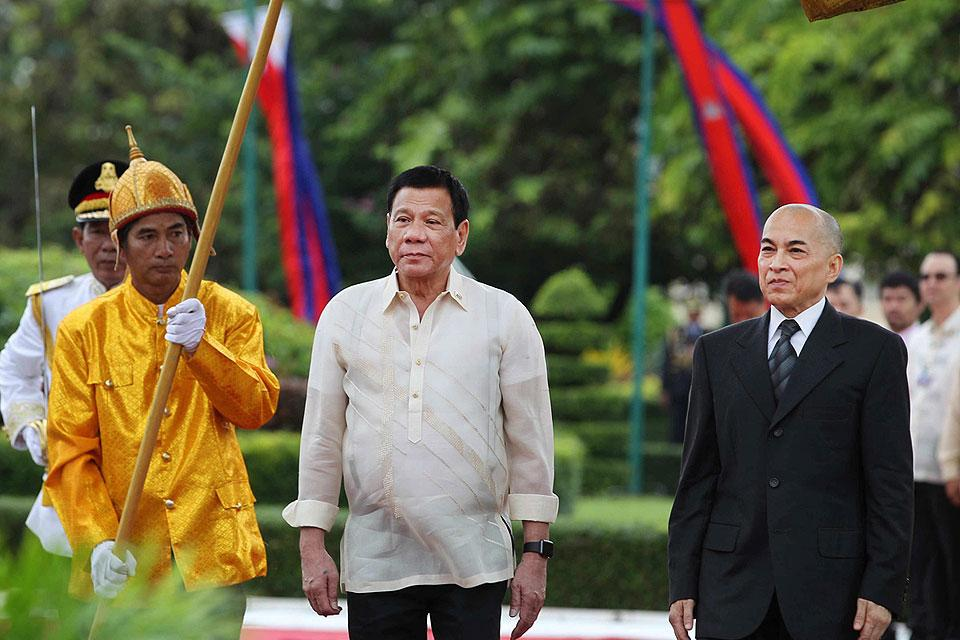
King Sihamoni is seen with then-President of the Philippines Rodrigo Duterte in 2016.

In 2006, at the government's petition, he granted a pardon to leading opposition politicians, namely Sam Rainsy and Cheam Channy, who originally had their parliamentary immunity annulled and were facing charges viewed as politically motivated. In regards to Rainsy, he was embroiled in a legal dispute with Prime Minister Hun Sen, over a 1997 grenade attack on a political rally, which injured Rainsy, as he was giving a speech. He had accused Prime Minister Sen of being involved, an accusation that the Prime Minister denies, though Rainsy later expressed regret in making the claim. As for Channy, he was designated as a prisoner of conscience by Amnesty International, where he was convicted for fraud and in attempting to conspire to overthrow the government. At the time, the move by Sihamoni was found to be encouraging by international observers as it indicated a conciliatory gesture that points to a reduction of political tensions and restoration of multi-party democracy in the country.

In 2009, Sihamoni, upon considering the appeals made to him for the review of the conviction verdict against opposition-affiliated journalist and editor Hang Chakra, who was jailed on charges of "criminal disinformation", sought the government's support for a prospective royal pardon. The appeals were made to him in his capacity as a member of the Supreme Council of the Magistracy. This request was reportedly rejected by the government for reasons not stated, but it was eventually later accepted, of which Sihamoni went on to grant a full pardon to Chakra in 2010.

In late 2009, amid then-strained diplomatic relations between Cambodia and Thailand, Sihamoni pardoned a Thai national, Siwarak Chutipongse, on humanitarian grounds after a request by multiple parties, including Siwarak's mother, the Pheu Thai Party and former Thai Prime Minister Thaksin Shinawatra. Siwarak had been controversially charged and jailed by a Cambodian court for espionage due to his leaking sensitive flight-related details of Thaksin to Thai officials. Around that time, Thaksin was living in exile abroad despite being a wanted fugitive for corruption in his homeland, which he challenged. He also served as an advisor to the Cambodian government, which publicly backed Thaksin and resisted the extradition attempt from the Thai government.

==== General election of 2013 and aftermath ====
For the interest of the nation and our people, and for peace and national stability, I would like to appeal to the two political parties that people have voted for... to continue to find a peaceful solution to the dispute and the remaining issues. I also would like to appeal to all people to stay calm for the dignity of the nation and continue to conduct business peacefully.

— King Sihamoni's public statement in August 2013 amid the political crisis arising from that year's election

In the lead-up to the 2013 Cambodian general election, Sihamoni at the request of the government, granted a royal pardon which enabled then Opposition Leader Sam Rainsy, who had been in self-imposed exile since 2009, to partake in the election which was welcomed by the United Nations. Prior to the pardoning, Rainsy had found himself in legal jeopardy once again due to another politically motivated charge brought against him arising from an incident in 2009. When the election outcome became disputed between the ruling Cambodian People's Party (CPP) and opposition Cambodia National Rescue Party (CNRP), the subsequent aftermath resulted in the 2013–2014 Cambodian protests.

Consequently, in what is regarded as the first time he had intervened directly to try to resolve a political dispute, the King attempted to play a mediating role and urged for national reconciliation, by exercising his moral authority to facilitate talks between the two party leaders, Rainsy and Prime Minister Hun Sen. He implored for a de-escalation of tensions, including an end to the violence between the protestors and authorities, and for the parties to find common ground towards a resolution regarding their issues. In late July 2014, the CPP and CNRP eventually reached a mutually agreed deal to resolve the political impasse.

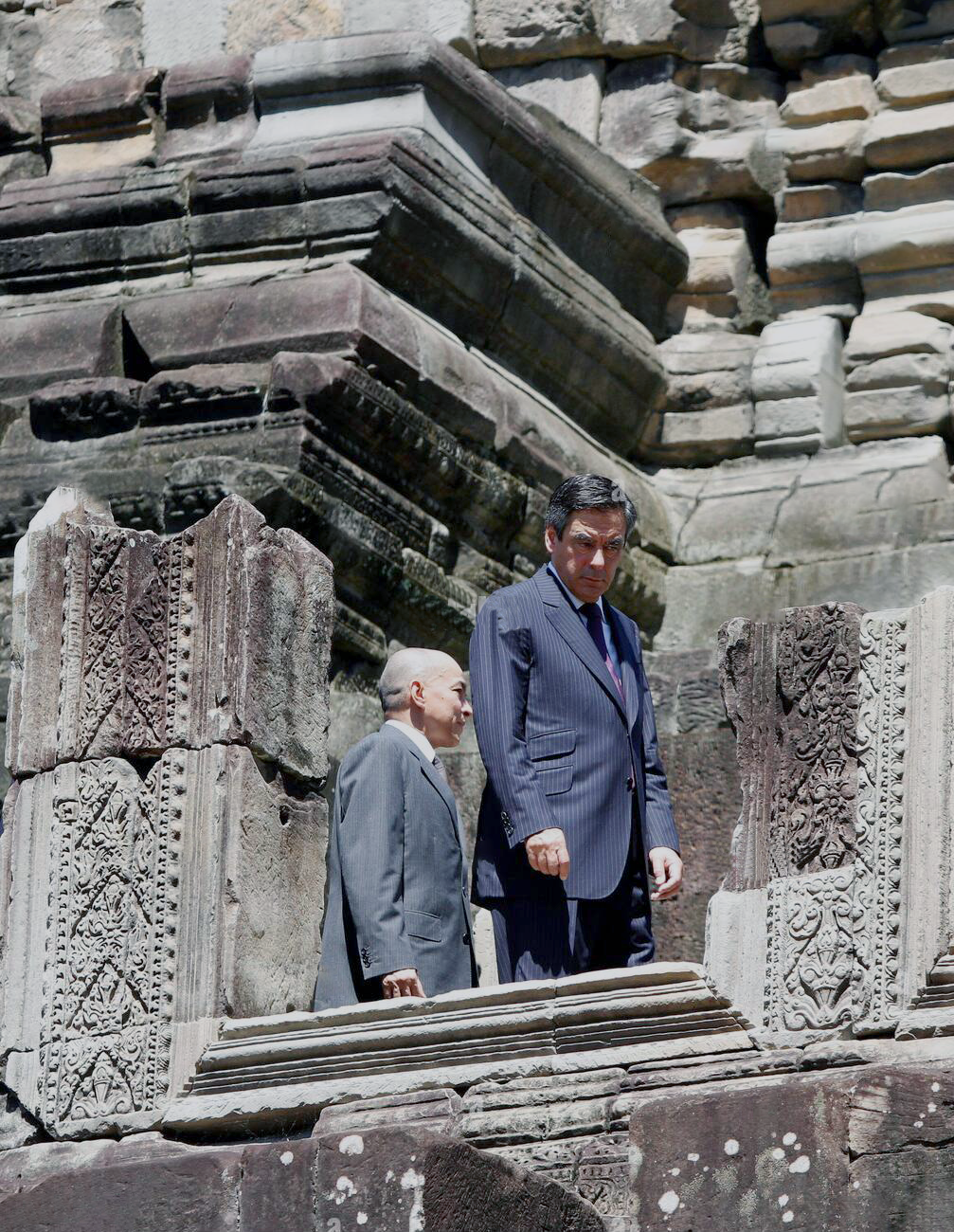
French Prime Minister François Fillon with King Sihamoni in 2011 at the Baphuon temple.

After this, in August 2014, Sihamoni would formally swear-in Rainsy and the CNRP members of parliaments who had up until then, refused to assume their seats in the National Assembly because of the dispute, though he had earlier officiated Prime Minister Sen's and CPP lawmakers' swearing-in ceremony in September of the previous year due to a constitutional necessity. He later encouraged the two sides to "continue to work together for the sake of stability, development and national unity" and for a time, there was a "culture of dialogue" between the rival political parties. This period of dialogue was relatively short-lived as tensions soon manifested again that culminated in the dissolution of the CNRP in late 2017 and the reallocation of the party's seats that they won in the general election to other political parties in concurrence with the gradual persecution of members associated with the CNRP.

==== Controversial legislation ====
In the same year, a piece of legislation was introduced, named the Political Parties Law, that human rights organisations saw as a means of further curtailing the power of the opposition in the run-up to the 2018 Cambodian general election. When it came to the formalization of this law through the required royal assent, Sihamoni was coincidentally overseas, thereby delegating the royal assent duties to the President of the Senate, who constitutionally serves as the acting head of state in the King's absence. This then prompted speculation as to whether there was an underlying reason behind the timing of his overseas trip. During the legislative processes that was taking place to enact this law, a letter additionally emerged, of which Sihamoni had encouraged for all Cambodians to vote without intimidation ahead of the 2017 communal elections. Nonetheless, officials of the ruling CPP denied such speculation and insist that the King's trip were non-politically motivated.

Similarly, in February 2018, about the Lèse-majesté Law, which too had concerns expressed about it by various observers, speculation was fuelled again, when the King did not directly sign this legislation into law, due to a planned foreign trip. Some analysts maintained that this did not merely occur by chance, though others cautioned that such an assumption cannot be verified without actual official confirmation. Regardless, commentators noted that it added to a perception that Sihamoni tends to be overseas to avoid having to give his signature to highly contentious legislations and that such trips are supposedly timed, which then trigger a delegation of responsibility to the next constitutional office holder. It is theorized that the reason for this is that caught between the dilemmas of his position to concurrently not politically interfere and to also serve as a political guarantor, these absences are a way for the King to meet a middle ground through the "symbolic denial of royal legitimacy." However, the question still remains as to whether they constitute as "legitimate absences or absent legitimacy."

Interestingly, a few years prior in 2015, with respect to the then draft Law on Associations and Non-Governmental Organisations (LANGO), which was equally controversial, the King did sign this into law. This is despite the unprecedented action taken by Cambodian civil society, specifically by 26 non-governmental organisations, to directly lobby Sihamoni to not give his royal assent. They had cited his constitutional imperative as a "guarantor" and the proposed law's restrictive effects on their collective ability to function effectively as key reasons for why he should agree to their request. To that end, their failed attempt in petitioning the King demonstrated constraints associated with the above-mentioned theory.

==== 2018 elections and developments ====
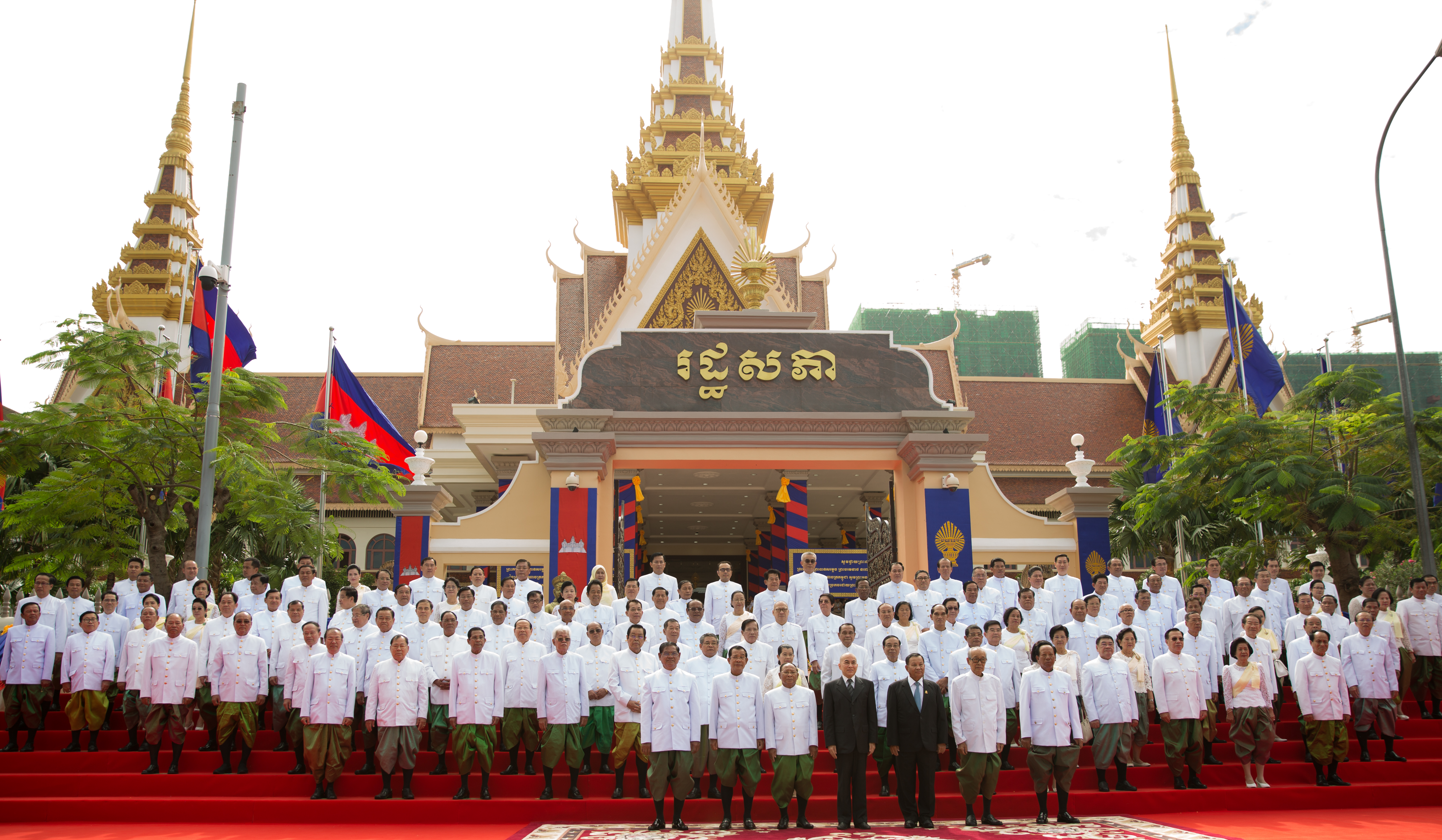
King Sihamoni is seen with parliamentarians outside the National Assembly on 5 September 2018.

In 2018, Sihamoni urged for Cambodians to vote in the national elections, notwithstanding calls made by exiled Opposition Leader Sam Rainsy to resist such a move and for the public to boycott the election. After the year's general election and senate election, which saw the ruling CPP retaining power, winning virtually every seat in both houses of parliament, much to the consternation of members of the now-dissolved opposition, international observers and human rights groups, whom all voiced unease about the deteriorating state of political affairs in the country, not least, the lack of a viable opposition, Sihamoni convened the opening of the national legislature. He had urged parliamentarians in both the National Assembly and Senate to protect the rights of all Cambodians and seek ways to bring about national unity and in bettering the lives of the overall populace, whilst highlighting the nation's long path towards peace and development. Several Western countries boycotted the opening, but the King noted in his speech that the opening of parliament was nonetheless constitutionally mandated.

Further, again at the request of the government, he has approved political clemency requests for several former members of the dissolved CNRP to participate in politics again, like for example in 2020, with respect to former chief whip Son Chhay and in 2021, with Pol Hom, who was a deputy party president. Both Chhay and Ham were amongst at least 32 former CNRP political figures, as of February 2022, that the King has politically rehabilitated. Sihamoni, also had granted a royal pardon for Rainsy's deputy and later successor, Kem Sokha who had defamation charges against him stemming from an alleged adultery, though his separate treason charge remained until he was convicted in early 2023. Aside from the CNRP related cases aforementioned, other high-profile pardons include that of land rights activist Tep Vanny and Australian filmmaker James Ricketson.

==== 2022 elections and ASEAN summit ====
In the 2022 communal elections, he reiterated his call for all eligible Cambodians to participate in the civic process by exercising their right to vote, and to "not worry about oppression, threats or intimidation from any person or party at all", something that he had previously urged a few years back in the 2017 communal elections. Several political parties expressed appreciation for the King's public appeal. The communal elections result saw a victory for the ruling CPP, although the Candlelight Party, which has links with the dissolved CNRP, made some relatively surprising gains.

At the ASEAN summit in November 2022, Sihamoni hosted regional leaders at the royal palace where he reinforced Cambodia's commitment to the bloc of nations and emphasized the continued importance of inter-state collaboration in addressing contemporary issues. Later, at the interrelated 43rd General Assembly of the ASEAN Inter-Parliamentary Assembly, he further touched upon several topics. This included the centrality of peace in relation to socio-economic development, healthcare and educational investment, concern regarding the Myanmar conflict, the impact of increasing tensions between global powers, the threat of nuclear weapons, climate change, and the lingering effects of the COVID-19 pandemic.

==== 2023 general election ====
In February 2023, several months ahead of the 23 July general election, Sihamoni once again advocated, as he has done in prior years, for electoral participation amongst the public and for free elections to take place. His call was backed by the National Election Committee whom urged the citizenry to heed the King's message, despite insinuations of bias levelled against him by former opposition leader Rainsy. These claims were roundly rejected and condemned by government officials, including multiple cabinet ministers.

The election unsurprisingly resulted in the CPP's victory in which they retained their ruling majority in the legislature, though there was controversy involving the disqualification of the opposition Candlelight Party by electoral authorities. On 26 July, just a few days after the election, Prime Minister Hun Sen announced his intention to tender his resignation in favour of his son, Hun Manet. Sen had an audience with Sihamoni at the Royal Palace who reportedly consented "in a formality" to his decision and for the transitional arrangements that was scheduled within August 2023 for Manet's and the new government's appointment. A royal decree was formally issued on 7 August, tasking Manet with forming a new government for the seventh mandate and requesting confidence from the National Assembly. In late August, he received the endorsement and confidence of the National Assembly to serve as head of government. Subsequently, King Sihamoni officially appointed and swore in Manet as the second Prime Minister of his reign along with the new cabinet and members of parliament as well as officiating the inaugural opening for the new legislative term.

=== Philanthropy ===
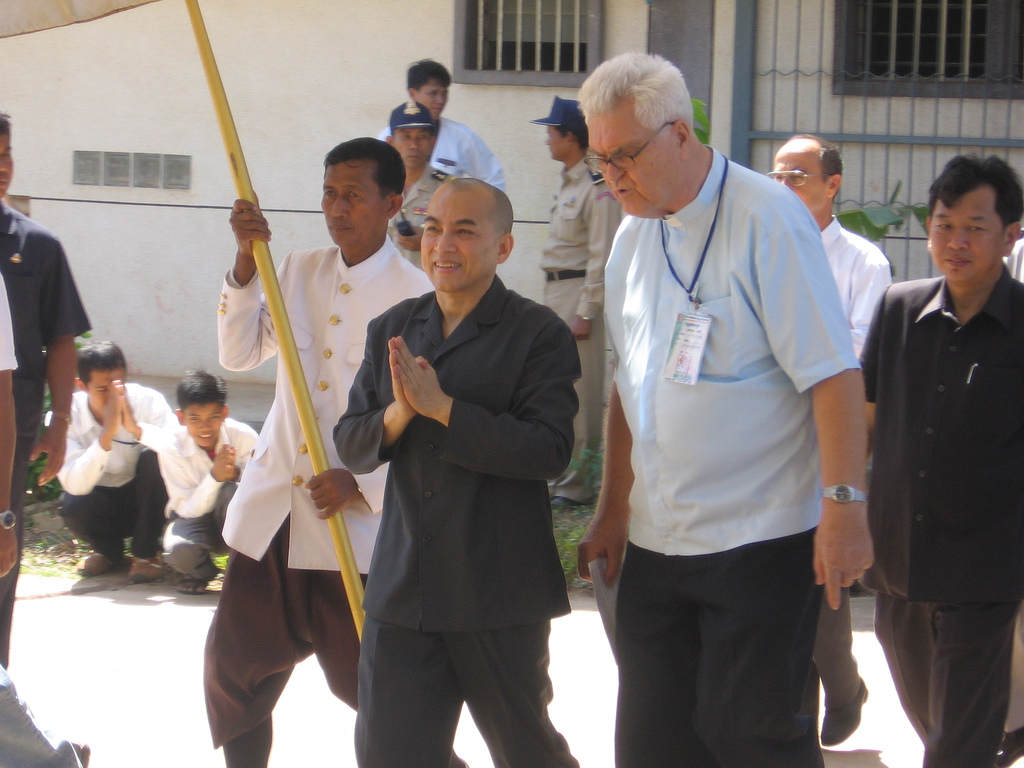
King Sihamoni visiting Don Bosco Technical School in Sihanoukville in 2007.

King Sihamoni's reign has been focused on the wellbeing of the Khmer people. He has been described by some as a humble monarch because of his philanthropic endeavours and is well known for carrying out humanitarian activities.

This can be seen through various examples such as in 2006, where when the relocation of one of the campuses of the Royal University of Fine Arts caused an inconvenience to students and teachers, including posing safety concerns, he arranged for the donation of three minibuses to assist with transportation. Another example was in the aftermath of the 2010 Phnom Penh stampede at Koh Pich that saw hundreds killed and injured, where he reached out to the victims and their families, donating money to every household who had lost a family member in the incident, as well as financially supporting those who were injured. In 2016, he donated a record-breaking $6.5 million from the proceeds that was gained from the selling of the royal residence in Koh Kong to the Kantha Bopha Foundation, which oversees a group of nationally renowned children's hospitals. Furthermore, in 2018, upon learning of the plight of provincial people affected by flooding, he gave essential goods to over 500 families.

At times, he has even assisted his fellow citizens first-hand during adverse events, such as venturing out into flooded areas and handing out goods to victims directly and was once reported to have requested for his official state car to stop so he can give a blanket to an elderly Cambodian who he saw on the roadside. Additionally, Sihamoni is said to donate to the Cambodian Red Cross on a regular basis and has authorized royal grants for infrastructure, schools, orphanages, struggling communities, religious institutions, people affected by a disability, rehabilitation centres, mental health organizations, victims of violence, and sponsoring student's trips among others. His philanthropy extends in the international context as well, like for instance, after Hurricane Katrina, the King made a personal good-will donation to victims of the storm. He has also donated towards multiple relief efforts after the occurrence of natural disasters in China.

Amidst the global COVID-19 pandemic, King Sihamoni, alongside Queen Mother Norodom Monineath has donated well over $1 million to the Royal Government of Cambodia's efforts to address the situation in Cambodia, inspiring a concerted public campaign across the country. Moreover, the King has made contributions in the provision of essential supplies, including donations of food, water and face masks to Cambodians severely impacted by COVID-19. In July 2022, he contributed $500,000 towards ongoing demining efforts in the nation, which is still plagued by problematic landmines leftover from decades of conflict.

In 2024, on the occasion of National Clean City Day, he publicly recognised and distributed goods to more than 2000 rubbish collectors for their work to upkeep the capital Phnom Penh. In the same year, to commemorate the 161st Anniversary of World Red Cross and Red Crescent Day, he and the Queen-Mother donated $100,000 to the Cambodian Red Cross.

=== Cultural advocacy ===
Dancing requires neither pen nor paintbrush. Only one instrument is necessary, the human body. Every motion is imbued with dance. To move is to dance. Dance exacts the utmost dedication of body, mind, and soul. Only the truly committed can pursue this demanding path . . . To us Khmers, dance in its most elaborate form is a means to draw us closer to the gods. Thus, dance becomes prayer. It becomes an indispensable ritual for the world to move forward, transcending us to the divine and raising us to supernatural heights.

— An excerpt from King Sihamoni's message to mark 2006 International Dance Day

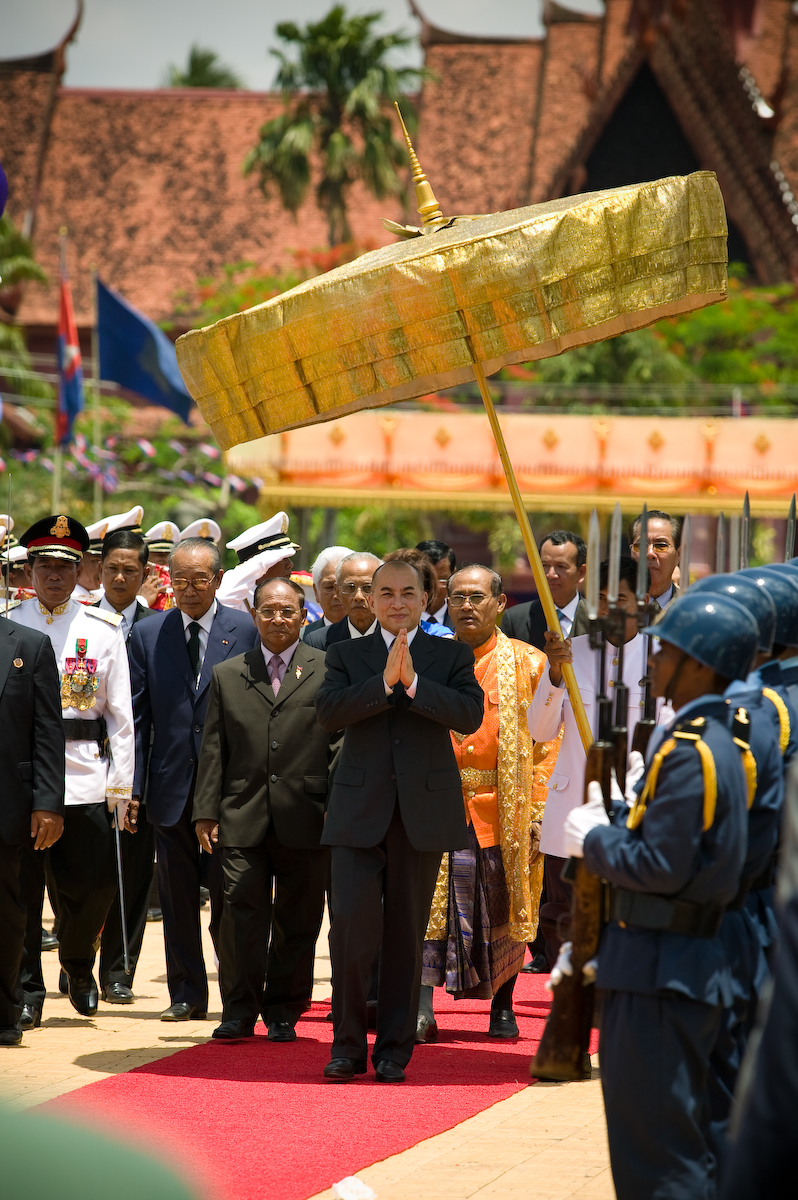
King Sihamoni arrives for the 2008 Royal Ploughing Ceremony in Phnom Penh with National Assembly President Heng Samrin and Royal Palace Minister Kong Sam Ol

Sihamoni remains an ardent advocate for Cambodian arts and culture. For instance, in 2006, when he was designated by the International Theatre Institute as its "Message Author" for International Dance Day, he extolled the symbolism and virtue of dance, with reference to the Royal Ballet of Cambodia. In September 2012, he presided over the opening of L'ombrello di Beatocello, a documentary film by Georges Gachot showcasing the life's work of famed Swiss pediatrician Beat Richner and his contribution to Khmer society. Likewise, in February 2017, he did the same at the global premiere of acclaimed Cambodian-based film First They Killed My Father, documenting the experiences of Loung Ung, a survivor of the Khmer Rouge and directed by Oscar-winning actress Angelina Jolie, whom he had earlier hosted, along with her family, at The Royal Residence in Siem Reap prior to the occasion. In March 2023, as part of the 12th Cambodian International Film Festival, he presided over the premiere screening for The Perfect Motion, a film directed by Xavier de Lauzanne, which explored the progression of the kingdom's Royal Ballet and one of the interlinked works by Princess Norodom Buppha Devi.

The King is a strong proponent of Buddhism and of the integral place it maintains in the cultural life of the Khmer nation, and he usually officiates key festivals on the Buddhist calendar. Moreover, he supports the work of the country's Ministry of Culture and Fine Arts whom reportedly engages regularly in consultations with him on advancing their overall strategic agenda. Additionally, as King, he presides over the annual Bon Om Touk, a major festive cultural event on the yearly calendar with ancient roots dating back to the Khmer Empire, in conjunction with other traditionally important national events like for example, Independence Day, the Royal Ploughing Ceremony, and Khmer New Year. He also presided over the torch lighting ceremony in March 2023 at Angkor Wat marking the start of the torch relay for the 32nd Southeast Asian Games that was held in Phnom Penh that same year in May.

Furthermore, Sihamoni has been commended for his dedication to archaeological preservation, conservation and research, with specificity to Cambodia. In particular, as Honorary President of ICC-Angkor (International Coordination Committee for the Safeguarding and Development of Historic Site of Angkor), King Sihamoni places special emphasis on the efforts to protect this national symbol and treasure, engaging frequently with the body's work through fulfilling representative functions or routine briefings given directly to him or via a delegated senior representative. In 2011, he attended the completion ceremony pertaining to restoration works at the Baphuon historical temple in Angkor. In late 2021, he championed Cambodia's bid for the proposed inclusion of Koh Ker, an ancient Khmer archaeological site, alongside Bokator, one of the kingdom's oldest martial arts on the UNESCO Intangible cultural heritage and World Heritage Site lists. The eventual outcome resulted in both being successfully inscribed on to their respective listings. In November 2023, the King inaugurated the formal ceremonies to commemorate the completion of restorative works for the western causeway into Angkor Wat and its reopening, which was closed for several years due to its deteriorating condition.

=== Overseas visits ===
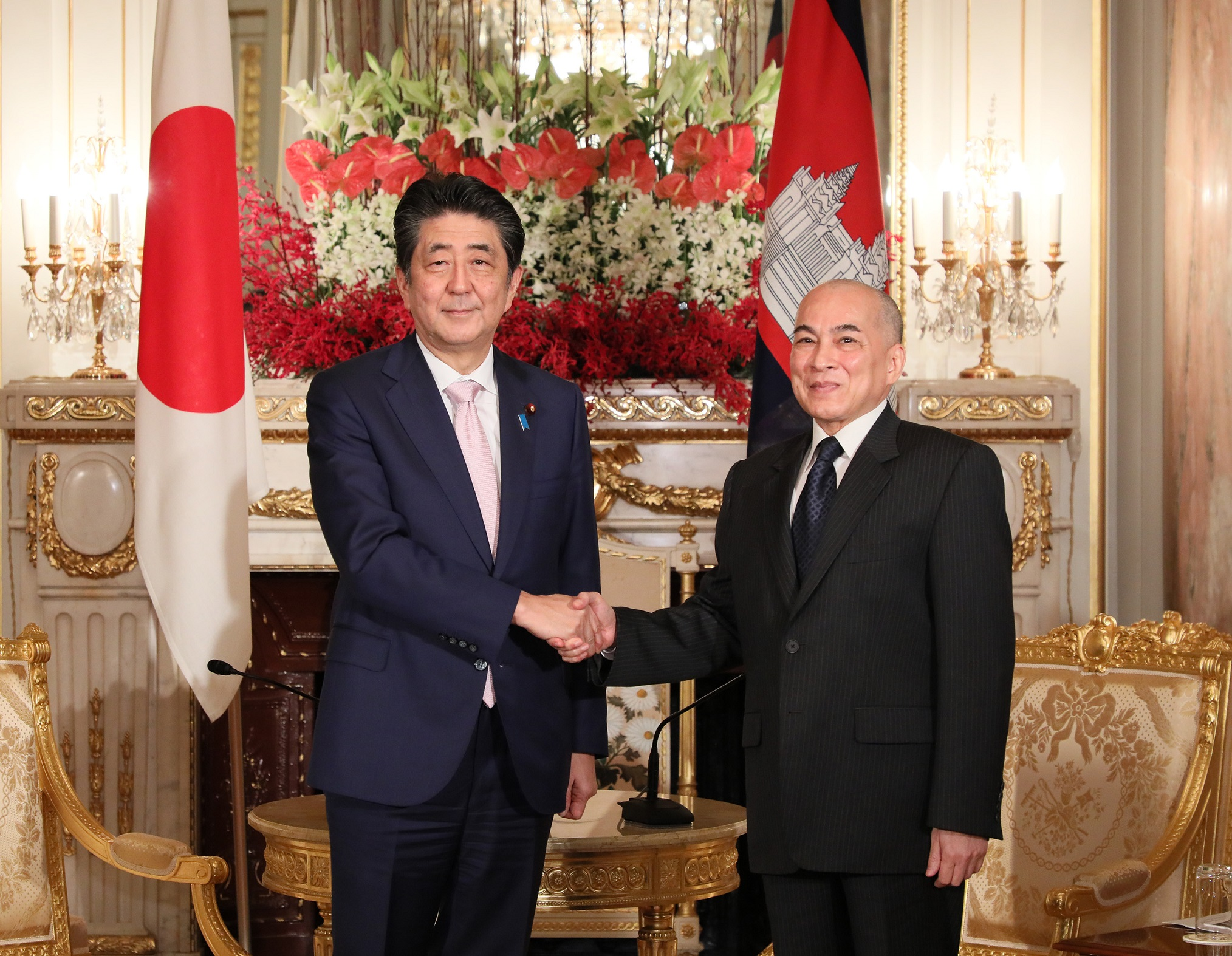
King Norodom Sihamoni and Japanese prime minister Shinzo Abe in Tokyo, Japan on 22 October 2019.

In the international arena, Sihamoni's first official foreign trip as King was to China in 2004, where he met with President Hu Jintao, indicative of a strong friendship long established from the days of his father between China and the Cambodian royal family. Here, he routinely also undertakes yearly health-related visits, usually to Beijing and have formal courtesy calls with members of China's political leadership. In 2011 he declined to attend the royal wedding of then Catherine Middleton and Prince William, which some British tabloids headlined as a "snub." This was quickly refuted by Ministry of Foreign Affairs officials who informed that a declination notification was indeed advised and that no snub occurred whatsoever. In 2015, he attended the United Nations COP21 summit, and gave an impassioned speech highlighting the impact of the climate crisis on Cambodia and urging international efforts on this front to be expedited. He represented Cambodia at the 2019 Conference on Dialogue of Asian Civilizations (CDAC) in Beijing aimed at enhancing regional cooperation and intercultural exchange. Other notable trips include to Japan, where he was the first Cambodian sovereign since the monarchical restoration of the 1990s to visit, his "second homeland" of the Czech Republic where he spent his childhood, a landmark state visit to India, and France, Cambodia's former colonial power.

=== Public image ===
In contrast to his father, former King Norodom Sihanouk's "mercurial" and outspoken reign, commentators note that Sihamoni has maintained a relatively "low-key" profile, with his tenure being characterized by an award-winning article of The Phnom Penh Post as being "Reign of the quiet king." Nonetheless, leading national leaders across the political spectrum recognize the King as a unifying force in Cambodian society. Prime Minister Hun Sen gave praise to Sihamoni for honourably carrying out his role as a "symbol of national unity, stability, happiness and prosperity", noting his humanitarianism, as well as efforts in strengthening national prestige and fostering a "spirit of solidarity" amongst Cambodians. Similarly, de facto Leader of the Opposition Sam Rainsy, shares this sentiment, welcoming his ability to bring people together in the national interest, although amid internal political developments that is seen as indicative of democratic backsliding, this view held by Rainsy has not always been consistent. Thus, it is within this juxtaposition, from a power politics analytical standpoint, including on the limits and extent of constitutional monarchism and given the political polarization, that there are often divergent perspectives concerning the King, between those who implore for his active politicism and those who advocate he sustain his guarded apoliticism.

Scholar Milton Osborne, regarded as amongst the world's most distinguished authors specializing in Southeast Asia, commends him as a "dedicated servant of his people" that is "cultured and disciplined", but he questions the monarchical institution's long-term survivability. The latter can be attributed in part due to competing power structures whereby there were periods of past historical tensions between some members of the royal family and the executive branch. However, in recent years, Prime Minister Hun Sen has given steadfast assurances which therefore signals his government's intent to preserve the monarchy well into the future. Prominent Cambodian history professor Sambo Manara credits Sihamoni as a "morale model" for all Khmer people whom exudes a calm and kind demeanor, underscored by a sincere warmth towards his subjects, notwithstanding some misconceived notions about the King's role from within some sectors of the population, in particular, the youth demographic.

Reflecting after a royal audience with the King in 2013, then International Monetary Fund Managing Director Christine Lagarde expressed how she was profoundly touched by his "thoughtfulness and compassion" and how he "not only cares deeply about the welfare of his people, but is clearly passionately devoted to promoting the cultural and artistic heritage of his country." On the occasion of his 68th birthday, ASEAN described King Sihamoni as a monarch who is "cherished and well-respected by the people of Cambodia" and as someone who exemplifies "dignified and humbled leadership", characterized by his frequent engagements with the populace through local visitations. The King's birthday on 14 May in conjunction with his coronation day on 29 October are both annual public holidays in Cambodia and in 2019, a special commemorative 15,000 riel was issued in his honour, celebrating the 15th anniversary of his tenure as sovereign. Sihamoni is also featured on the 200, 500, 2,000, 10,000, 20,000 and 100,000 riels respectively and his portrait, alongside the King-father and Queen-mother is prominent across many parts of the country, illustrative of their highly revered status.

=== Lèse-majesté ===
In February 2018, the penal code was formally revised to incorporate lèse-majesté legislation, which makes it an offence to insult the king, pursuant to its promulgation by Cambodia's National Assembly and Senate, and the law came into effect the following month. Human rights groups had voiced concerns that the law may be potentially used to suppress political opponents of the government and considered it to be incompatible with respect to the freedom of speech, though the Ministry of Justice maintains that the law is necessary in protecting the monarchy from people who push the boundaries of said freedom. After this law was enacted, there have been seldom arrests, charges and convictions, with the most notable case being that of Opposition Leader Sam Rainsy. Prior to this legislative enactment, the constitution did acknowledge the "inviolability" of the monarch and this constitutional provision was tested in 2017, when the Ministry of Interior pursued charges against a few individuals writing on social media.

== Personal life ==
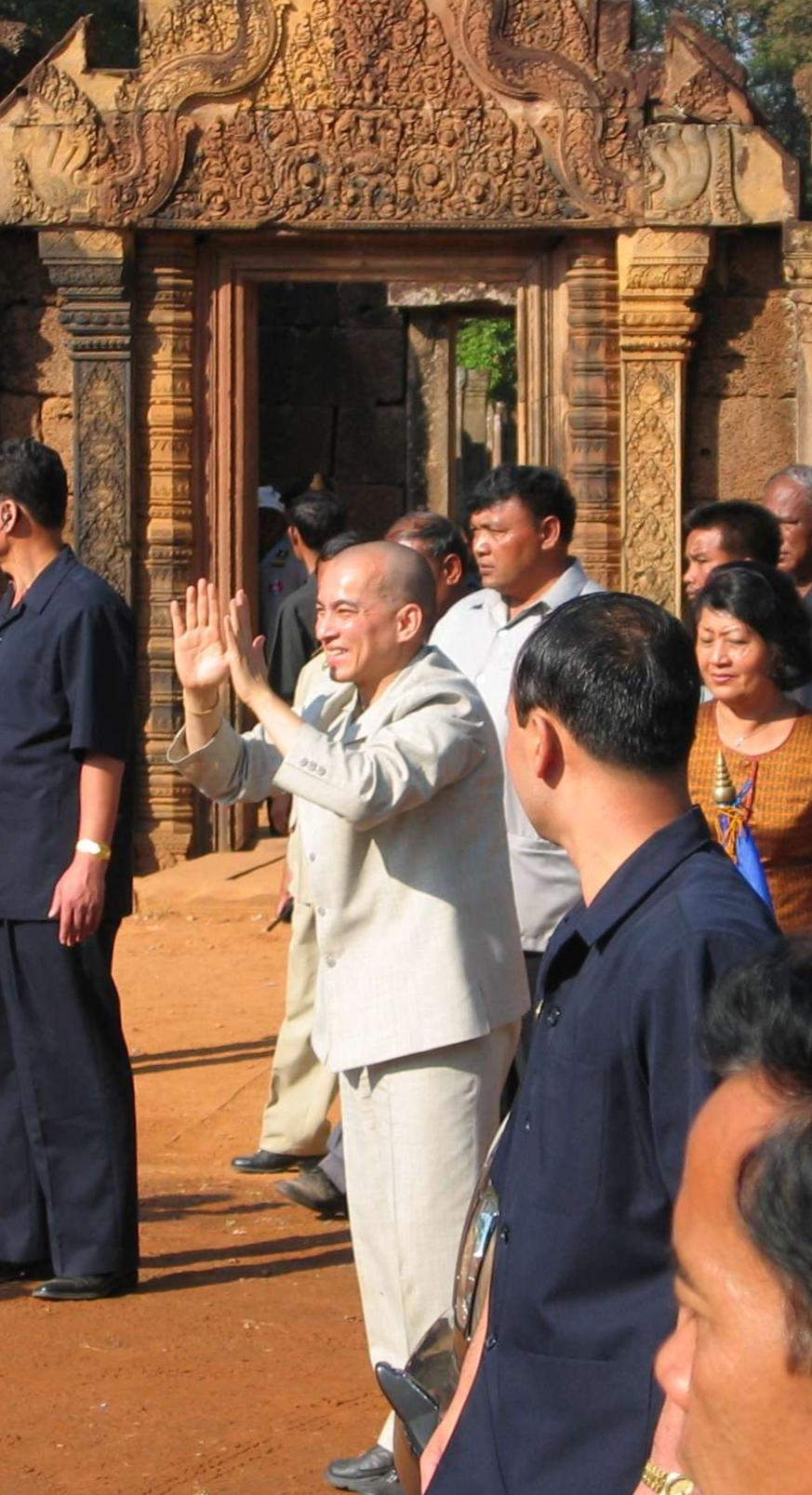
King Sihamoni visiting Banteay Srei temple in 2005

The King is a bachelor and has no children. As Cambodia is not a hereditary monarchy, but rather an elective monarchy, his future successor will be determined by the Royal Council of the Throne, chosen from the lineage of one of the two royal houses of Cambodia, in accordance with the country's constitution. His parents, King-Father Norodom Sihanouk and Queen-Mother Norodom Monineath, were once questioned by journalists about Sihamoni's marital status and when he was planning to get married. In response, the Queen-Mother replied that her son "only feels Buddhist" and that "he confines himself to Buddhism." The King-Father added that because of this, his son's affection for women is akin to that of "as his sisters" and that "he dares not to make a deep relationship." This reportedly reflects Sihamoni's adherence to a monastic way of life which is underpinned by austere piety and devotion to faith. Although this "lifelong bachelor" status has also resulted in some interrogations and rumors about his sexuality. In some respects, Sihamoni is regarded somewhat as an enigmatic figure, with the available literature pointing to a "reflective, deliberate and cultured man" who apparently had reservations in becoming king, yet in spite of this, humbly assumed the solemn responsibility of his position, whilst holding "his cards close to his chest."

=== Interests ===
It has been reported that the king "is a man of simple tastes", with a strong interest in the arts and culture. Purportedly, in his free time he enjoys the peace of meditation, reading, exercising, listening to classical music such as by the likes of Beethoven and observance to traditional Buddhist rituals. In addition, it is reported that he enjoys comedy films, is the occasional fan of chocolates, and likes to keep up with current events and news. Moreover, alongside having an interest in DVDs relating to ballet and opera in general, he also plays piano and is reputedly a keen reader of reviews covering the Czech theatre scene.

=== Wealth ===
During speeches that Prime Minister Hun Sen delivered in November 2020 and August 2021, he made rare public references about the King's wealth by mentioning that compared to other monarchies in the world, Cambodia's monarchy is amongst the poorest. He further added that the King does not have his own private property. However, these factors, Sen noted, were irrelevant, as more importantly, Sihamoni has "a generous heart towards his people as evident by his philanthropic contributions".

=== Languages ===
Besides his native Khmer, Sihamoni speaks Czech fluently, being the only ruling monarch in the world to do so. The king is also fluent in French and is a conversational speaker of English and Russian. He has basic fluency in Mandarin as well.

=== Health ===
On 18 April 2026, Sihamoni underwent surgery for prostate cancer in a hospital in Beijing. He was discharged on 1 May 2026.

=== Filmography ===
Then-Prince Sihamoni during the 1960s and 1990s starred in a few films, mainly directed by his father, who was a prolific film-maker. He has also been the subject of documentaries and directed a few films himself.

English title	Other names	Year	Role	Notes	Ref.
The Curious History of Cambodia's Beloved Kings	N/A	2021	Subject	Documentary part of a series called 'Asia's Monarchies', made by 'Real Royalty'	
The Other Little Prince	Jiný malý princ	1967	Subject	A Czech Documentary film — Directed by Vladimir Sís	
My Village at Sunset	Mon village au coucher du soleil	1992	Actor	Film was the winner of the Prix Special at the Saint Petersburg Festival — Directed by Norodom Sihanouk	
The Little Prince	Prachea Komar (ព្រះប្រជាកុមារ)	1967	Actor	Film won the Golden Apsara Award at the 1968 Phnom Penh International Film Festival — Directed by Norodom Sihanouk	
Dream	N/A	1992	Director	A ballet film by Prince Sihamoni during his time at the Royal Khmer Cinematic Corporation or "Khemara Pictures"	
The Four Elements	Four Seasons	1993	Director	A ballet film by Prince Sihamoni during his time at the Royal Khmer Cinematic Corporation or "Khemara Pictures"	
Norodom Sihanouk, King and Film-maker	N/A	1997	Guest appearance	A French documentary film — Directed by Jean-Baptiste Martin and written by Frédéric Mitterrand	

== Titles and styles ==
Before he was crowned king, his princely royal title granted to him in February 1994 by King Sihanouk was Sdech Krom Khun (Khmer: ស្តេចក្រុមឃុន), or His Royal Highness Sdech Krom Khun Norodom Sihamoni, equating him to the rank of "Great Prince".

In August 2004, King Sihanouk elevated the then Prince Sihamoni to the distinguished title of Samdech Preah Boromneath (Khmer: សម្ដេចព្រះបរមនាថ).

As King, his full regnal title is Preahkaruna Preah Bath Samdech Preah Boromneath Norodom Sihamoni Samanphoum Cheatsasna Rakhatkhateya Khemrarothreas Puthinthrea Thoreamohaksat Khemreachnea Samophorpheas Kampuch Ekreachroatboranaksanteh Sopheakmongkulea Sereyvibolar Khemarasreypireas Preah Chao Krong Kampuchea Thipadey (in romanized Khmer); Khmer: ព្រះករុណាព្រះបាទសម្តេចព្រះបរមនាថ នរោត្តម សីហមុនី សមានភូមិជាតិសាសនា រក្ខតខត្តិយា ខេមរារដ្ឋរាស្ត្រ ពុទ្ធិន្ទ្រាធរាមមហាក្សត្រ ខេមរាជនា សមូហោភាស កម្ពុជឯករាជរដ្ឋបូរណសន្តិ សុភមង្គលា សិរីវិបុលា ខេមរាស្រីពិរាស្ត្រ ព្រះចៅក្រុងកម្ពុជាធិបតី, roughly translating to "His Merciful Excellent Majesty Protector, King Norodom Sihamoni, who unites the nation, religion, realms, and people of Khmer state, the great king who is supported by Buddha and Indra, the protector of independence, unification, and peace, the Great King of the Kingdom of Cambodia."

The King's shortened official title is His Majesty Preah Bat Samdech Preah Boromneath Norodom Sihamoni, King of the Kingdom of Cambodia (Khmer: ព្រះករុណា ព្រះបាទសម្តេច ព្រះបរមនាថ នរោត្តម សីហមុនី ព្រះមហាក្សត្រ នៃព្រះរាជាណាចក្រកម្ពុជា។).

In June 2015, he was bestowed the honorary religious title Preah SriLoka Dhammika Raja (Khmer: ព្រះស្រីលោកធម្មិករាជ), or "Virtuous King for the Propagation of Buddhism in the World", which was recommended for him at the Sixth Buddhist Summit in the year prior in December 2014.

During an overseas trip in September 2015, the academic title of Honorary Professor was conferred upon him by the Jiangxi University of Traditional Chinese Medicine in Nanchang, China.

On 24 June 2023, the World Fellowship of Buddhists (WFB) awarded the King the honorary title of 'Royal Patron' in an event held at the Royal Palace in Phnom Penh.

In the military context, one of his concurrent titular styles is 'Supreme Commander of the Royal Khmer Armed Forces', which is in line with the country's constitution.

== Patronages ==
As King, Sihamoni has served as the patron of many causes and organizations as well as a range of NGOs and NPOs. This includes, but is not limited to the below list:

=== Heritage ===
- Honorary President of ICC-Angkor (International Coordination Committee for the Safeguarding and Development of Historic Site of Angkor)
- Angkor Wat Western Causeway Restoration Project — Patron
- Baphuon Temple at Angkor Restoration Project — Patron
- Greater Angkor Collaborative Research Project — Patron
- Angkor Medieval Hospitals Archaeological Project — Patron
- Symposium "Deux décennies de coopération archéologique franco-cambodgienne à Angkor" — Patron
- Guimet Museum — Patron of "Angkor: The Rise of a Myth" Exhibition
- Preah Norodom Sihanouk-Angkor Museum — Patron of inauguration ceremony
- Koh Ker Temple — Patron of successful bid for its inclusion on the UNESCO World Heritage Site list
- Preah Suramarit National Theatre — Patron of attempted restoration efforts
- Statue of St. John of Nepomuk in Divina, Slovakia — Patron of the project of restoration (2017).

=== Cultural ===
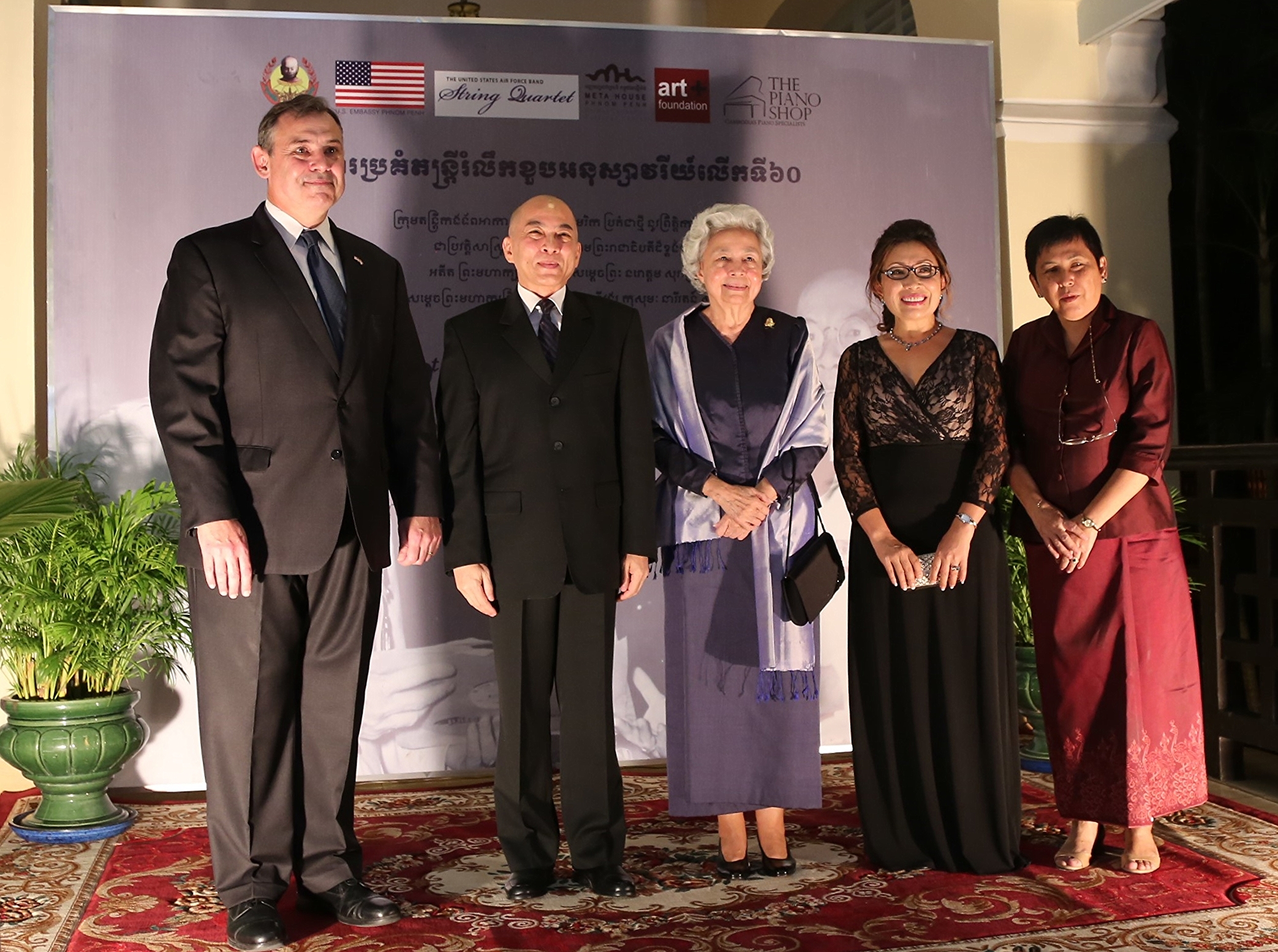
US Ambassador Heidt, King Sihamoni, Queen-Mother Monineath, Mrs. Heidt, and Culture Minister Sackona at the US Air Force Band String Quartet special concert in 2016

- Member of the High Council of French-speaking Countries (2004).
- Foreign Associate Member of the Académie des Inscriptions et Belles-Lettres (2008).
- International Dance Day — Message Author (2006)
- Mozart at Angkor Project — Patron
- Center for Khmer Studies Library, Siem Reap — Patron
- Nginn Karet Foundation for Cambodia (Preah Ream Buppha Devi Conservatoire) — Patron of dance troupe 'The Sacred Dancers of Angkor'
- Nuits d'Angkor Festival — Patron
- Cambodian Living Arts — Patron
- Cambodian International Film Festival (CIFF) — Patron
- Technicolour Foundation (MEMORY! International Film Heritage Festival) (2014) — Patron
- Cie Cabaret des Oiseaux — Patron
- GoGo Cambodia world record-setting Krama initiative — Patron
- Angkor Archaeological Park meditation centre — Patron
- Ricardo Casal's "90 Khmer Figures" Art Exhibition (in collaboration with Royal University of Fine Arts as part of 2013 French Week) — Patron
- Kep Expo 2018 — Patron
- United States Embassy in Cambodia's Air Force Band String Quartet special concert (8 May 2016) — Patron
- Royal Thai Embassy in Cambodia's "Choral Music for Friendship: A Concert by Suanplu Chorus" (21 June 2019) — Patron
- China Disabled Persons' Performing Art Troupe — Patron
- Battery Dance Company — Patron of performance on 21 October 2006
- First They Killed My Father — Patron of film
- L'ombrello di Beatocello — Patron of film
- The Perfect Motion — Patron of film

=== Community ===
- Cambodian Red Cross — Patron
- Cambodian Children's Fund — Patron
- Samdech Euv Team — Patron
- Krousar Thmey Foundation — 25th Anniversary Celebration Ceremony Honorary President
- Transcultural Psychosocial Organization (Cambodia) — Patron of 20th Anniversary Celebration and new Mental Health Treatment Center
- Kantha Bopha Foundation — Patron of 25th Anniversary, new ward (Kantha Bopha V), surgery centre (Kantha Bopha I) & major donor
- Eye Care Foundation — Patron
- Samdech Techo Project for Mine Action (STP-MA) — Patron
- Preah Sihamoniraja Buddhist University — Establishing Patron
- Sihanouk Hospital Center of Hope — Patron
- Calmette Hospital Neurology Center (Centre De Neurosciences) — Patron
- Teach Them To Fish Foundation — Patron
- Cambodian Day of Older People / International Day of Older Persons — Patron
- International Children's Day — Patron
- KaisKids Orphanage — Patron
- Waltzing Around Cambodia Onlus — Patron
- AIP Foundation — Patron of Cambodia Helmet Vaccine Initiative (CHVI)
- House of Family — Patron
- Cambodian National Committee to Fight COVID-19 — Patron
- Royal University of Fine Arts — Patron of transportation service through the donation of 3 minibuses to the university's north campus
- Don Bosco Foundation — Patron
- Hurricane Katrina disaster relief — Patron
- General disaster relief in China — Patron (the King has made several donations in the aftermath of natural disasters)

=== Sporting ===
- Royal Angkor Endurance Competition 2018 — Patron of inaugural event
- Norodom Sihanouk du Cambodge National Show Jumping Championships — Patron
- 32nd Southeast Asian (SEA) Games — Patron
- Bokator (Khmer martial art) — Patron of successful bid for its inclusion on the UNESCO Intangible cultural heritage list

=== Environmental ===
- Airavata Elephant Foundation — Establishing Patron
- National Arbor Day — Patron
- Rubbish Project — Patron of Nāga Sculpture in Siem Reap to mark 2008 World Water Day
- National Clean City Day — Patron

== Honours ==
=== National honours ===
Cambodia
Grand Cross of the Royal Order of Cambodia
Grand Cross of the Royal Order of Monisaraphon

=== Foreign honours ===
France
Grand Cross of the Order of the Legion of Honour (2006)
Japan
Collar and Grand Cordon of the Supreme Order of the Chrysanthemum (11 May 2010)

=== Ecumenical orders ===
- Order of Saint Lazarus: Grand Cross of Merit of the Order of Saint Lazarus (10 May 2008)

=== Awards ===
- Czech Republic: Gratias Agit Award of the Ministry of Foreign Affairs (2006)
- Prague: Honorary Citizen of the City of Prague (2006)
- Paris: Silver Medal of the City of Paris

=== Honorary degrees ===
- Academy of Performing Arts in Prague, Honorary Doctorate (19 March 2010)
- Naresuan University, Honorary Doctorate in Political Science (12 June 2015)
- St. Elizabeth University of Health and Social Sciences, Honorary Doctorate in Social Work

=== Honorific eponyms ===
- Dendrobium Norodom Sihamoni, an orchid named in honour of the King (30 March 2006)
- Musee Preahbat Samdech Preah Boromneath Norodom Sihamoni (Norodom Sihamoni Museum), Royal Palace, Phnom Penh
- Sattapanniguha Auditorium (named in honour of King Sihamoni), Nenbutsushu Sampozan Muryojuji Temple, Katō, Hyōgo Prefecture, Japan
- Preah Norodom Sihamoni Primary School, in Chhnuk Trou Commune, Baribour district
- Preah Norodom Sihamoni General and Technical Lycée, in Kampot Province
- Preah Bat Samdech Preah Boromneath Norodom Sihamoni General & Technical High School, Aur Russei Commune, Kampong Tralach District
- Preah Sihamoniraja Buddhist University, in Phnom Penh
- Kantha Bopha-Sihamoni Monineath (Heart Surgery Centre II) at Kantha Bopha I Children's Hospital, in Phnom Penh
- King Sihamoni Meditation Centre at Angkor Archaeological Park, Siem Reap province
- King Norodom Sihamoni Boulevard, in Siem Reap, Siem Reap province
- King Norodom Sihamoni Avenue, in Siem Reap, Siem Reap province
- King Norodom Sihamoni Road, in Siem Reap, Siem Reap province

== Ancestry ==
Ancestors of Norodom Sihamoni

8. Norodom Sutharot
4. Norodom Suramarit
9. Norodom Phangangam
2. Norodom Sihanouk
10. Sisowath Monivong
5. Sisowath Kossamak
11. Norodom Kanviman
1. Norodom Sihamoni
6. Jean-François Izzi
3. Norodom Monineath
14. Peang
7. Pomme Peang
15. Ouk

Norodom Sihamoni House of Norodom Born: 14 May 1953
Regnal titles
Preceded by Norodom Sihanouk	King of Cambodia; 2004–present	Incumbent
