= National Reconciliation =

National Reconciliation is the term used for establishment of so-called 'national unity' in countries beset with political problems. It can refer to:

- National Reconciliation (Afghanistan) – Najibullah-era policy of the Democratic Republic of Afghanistan
- National Reconciliation (Australia) – a movement between Indigenous and non-Indigenous Australians
- National Reconciliation (Cambodia) – a process in Cambodia refers to efforts to create other truth-seeking and reconciliation mechanisms in the country
- National Reconciliation (Cuba)
- National Reconciliation (Lebanon) – 1989 agreement intended to end the Lebanese Civil War
- National Reconciliation (Myanmar) – Examination of human rights abuses in Myanmar
- National Reconciliation (Rwanda) – a reconciliation of the conflicting parties involved in the Rwandan Civil War and the Rwandan genocide
- National Reconciliation (Sierra Leone) – Truth commission investigating human rights violations during the Sierra Leone Civil war
- National Reconciliation (Sudan) – Reconciliation in Sudan in 1977
- National Reconciliation Ordinance – Presidential ordinance in Pakistan
- National Reconciliation Commission – Ghana
- National Reconciliation Week – Australian observance of indigenous cultures
- National Reconciliation and Peace Centre – Organization in Myanmar
- National Reconciliation Party – Political party in the Gambia
- National Reconciliation Council – North Korean government organization
- National Reconciliation Document – 2006 document by Palestinian prisoners

== See also ==
- Truth Commission (disambiguation)
- Truth and Reconciliation Commission (disambiguation)
