= Truth and Reconciliation Commission =

A truth and reconciliation commission is an official body tasked with discovering and revealing past wrongdoing by a government or other actors, in the hope of resolving conflict left over from the past. The concept has existed since the early 1990s at least, and the name Truth and Reconciliation Commission became commonly used following South Africa's commission in 1996.

Truth and Reconciliation Commission may also refer to:

== By country ==
- Truth and Reconciliation Commission (Burundi)
- Truth and Reconciliation Commission of Canada
- National Truth and Reconciliation Commission of Chile, which produced the Rettig Report (1991)
- Truth and Reconciliation Commission (Ivory Coast)
- Truth and Reconciliation Commission (DRC), Democratic Republic of the Congo
- Fiji Truth and Reconciliation Commission
- Truth and Reconciliation Commission (Germany)
- Truth and Reconciliation Commission (Honduras)
- Truth and Reconciliation Commission (Liberia)
- Truth and Reconciliation Commission (Nepal)
- Truth and Reconciliation Commission (Norway)
- Truth and Reconciliation Commission (Peru)
- Truth and Reconciliation Commission (Sierra Leone)
- Truth and Reconciliation Commission (Solomon Islands)
- Truth and Reconciliation Commission (South Africa)
- Truth and Reconciliation Commission (South Korea)

== Other places ==
- Greensboro Truth and Reconciliation Commission, Greensboro, North Carolina, United States
- Maine Wabanaki-State Truth and Reconciliation Commission, Maine, United States

== See also ==
- Commission for Reception, Truth and Reconciliation in East Timor (2001)
- Historical Clarification Commission, Guatemala (1994)
- Lessons Learnt and Reconciliation Commission (2010), Sri Lanka
- List of truth and reconciliation commissions
- Reconciliation and Unity Commission (proposed 2005), Fiji
- Truth and reconciliation in Myanmar
- Truth Commission (disambiguation)
- National Reconciliation (disambiguation)
