= Dammika =

Dammika is a given name. Notable people with the name include:

- Dammika Perera (born 1979), Sri Lankan cricketer
- Dammika Rajapakse (born 1971), Sri Lankan cricketer
- Dammika Ranatunga (born 1962), Sri Lankan cricketer

== See also ==
- Dhammika
