= Sandhya Raman =

Indian costume designer

- Born: 13 July 1967 (age 59); New Delhi, India
- Education: National Institute of Design
- Occupation: Costume designer

Sandhya Raman is an Indian costume designer and curator whose focus is on socially responsible designs. Raman is the founder of Desmania Foundation. Sandhya Raman designs costumes for dancers practicing contemporary as well as traditional dance forms.

== Education and career ==
Raman is an alumnus of the National Institute of Design, (Ahmedabad) with a specialization in Apparel and Textile Design.

== Exhibitions ==
- Enigmatic East - From Ziro to Infinity at The India Habitat Centre, Delhi on 29 January 2019.
- Enchanted Tree - an interactive exhibition celebrating the diverse textiles of India at Kamaldevi Complex, March 2017
- When the Pleats Dance - evolution of four decades of dance costumes at The Art Gallery of India International Centre
- (Un)masked - October 2017 (raised funds for International Medical Health Organization).

== Productions ==
- Goddess Central a dance drama which addressed the issue of female foeticide.
- Moonbeam(1991) choreographed by Jonathan Hollander Battery Dance Co. USA. enacted by Mallika Sarabhai.
- Songs of Tagore, choreographed by Jonathan Hollander.
- Beauty and Beast : Bharathakala Natya Academy .
- Padme: Anita Ratnam .
- Interrupted Aditi Mangaldas and Drishtikon Dance Company .
- Pralaya by Sampradaya Canada Lata pada .
- The incomplete Gesture : Natya Dance Theatre Chicago .
- Anekanta : Geeta Chandran and Natya Vriksha Dance company .

== Awards ==
(Stree) Nari Shakti Puraskar from Govt. of India 2008 and the Creative Excellence Award from UNFPA 2008.
