= Isheeta Ganguly =

Indian musical artist

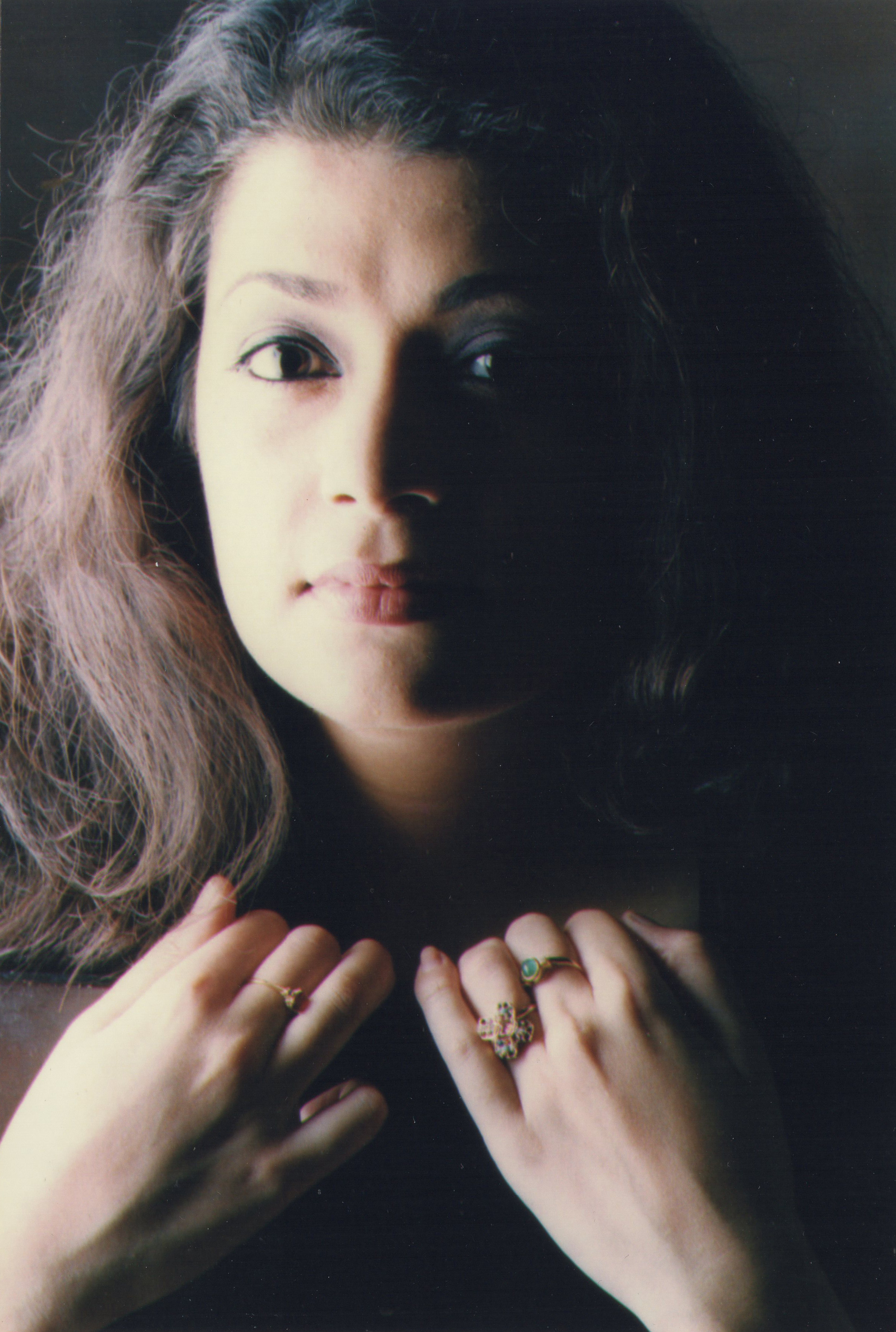
- Isheeta Ganguly

Background information
- Born: Kolkata, India
- Origin: Princeton, New Jersey, US
- Genres: Rabindra Sangeet, Hindustani classical music, Jazz, Pop, R&B
- Occupations: Singer, Playwright, Director
- Instrument: Vocalist
- Labels: T-Series, Times Music, Saregama

Isheeta Ganguly is an Indian-American singer, playwright, director. She is an exponent of Rabindra Sangeet with 8 albums to her credit. She is known for her contribution to Indian fusion music, and has released several music albums, notably Tomari Nam Bolbo, Ghare Baire, Nutan Jouboner Dut, Damaru I Feel Your Rhythm, Pather Pradip Jwale, Tumhi Shundaro Beshe Eshecho and Aj Khela Bhangar Khela. As a playwright, she is known for her plays Three Women, Shakuntala Awaits, and Sundays with Chitra and Chaitali.

== Early life and education ==
Ganguly was born in Kolkata, India and raised in Princeton, New Jersey, USA as well as Turkey, Japan, and Indonesia. As a child, she began to cultivate her passion for Tagore's music through LP records until she began her formal training in Rabindra Sangeet from Suchitra Mitra. Isheeta received her training in Indian classical music from Vijay Kitchku and A.T. Kanan.

Isheeta learnt the art of musical theatre curation and direction from Suchitra Mitra and further honed her music and performing artistry as an undergraduate at Brown University in Providence, Rhode Island. She has done her Masters in Public Health from Columbia University and spent over a decade as a management consultant at PricewaterhouseCoopers, Pfizer and Sesame Workshop.

== Career ==
Ganguly started her musical career at the age of 15 when she released her first music album of Tagore songs, Tomari Nam Bolbo. She released several music albums through record labels such as T-series, Saregama, and Times Music. Her notable albums include Ghare Baire, Nutan Jouboner Dut, Pather Pradip Jwale, Tumhi Shundaro Beshe Eshecho and Aj Khela Bhangar Khela (I nd II).

In August 2010, Ganguly released her eighth studio album, Damaru, which is inspired by the music of Rabindranath Tagore. It is one of the most prominent international Tagore fusion albums with Times Music featuring a voice-over by actor John Abraham on Tagore's Where The Mind Is Without Fear. This was created in collaboration with New York-based producer Phil Levy and Grammy award winner Tanmoy Bose, Shantanu Moitra and Swanand Kirkire created folk-pop tracks on the multi-lingual album, Damaru, which include Aona and Sanjhari De Bat.

Ganguly was a part of several multi-cultural productions and performing arts groups at Brown University and collaborated with the Battery Dance company and Jonathan Hollander on Tagore fusion and ballet performance at the Florence Gould Hall in New York City in 2000. Thereafter she joined hands with a renowned danseuse Mallika Sarabhai for collaboration on Tagore's Still I Rise at the Alvin Ailey Dance Company in New York City.

Ganguly also began performing annually at the NYSIFF (New York India South Asian Festival) for stalwarts such as James Ivory, Ismail Merchant, Martin Scorsese, Harry Belafonte and others. Among, Ganguly's other New York City appearances, she has performed for Chelsea Clinton at the Intrepid Museum, Rubin Museum, at the Public Theatre and at the Lincoln Centre.

Ganguly has collaborated with Tanushree Shankar for Chiranthan with a voice-over done by Amitabh Bachchan. She has performed Rabindra Sangeet both in India and the US. In February 2013, she performed pieces ranging from Vande Mataram to Tagore's Ekla Chalo Re at Kala Ghoda Arts Festival in Mumbai, collaborating with Shabana Azmi. She dedicated Ekla Chalo Re to Nirbhaya, the 2012 Delhi gang rape and murder case victim. In January 2014, she performed at Indian Council for Cultural Relations, Kolkata, with Priyanshu Chatterjee.

=== Theatre ===
As a playwright and theatre director, she has written and directed various plays, including Sundays with Chitra and Chaitali, Three Women, Shakuntala Awaits.

Her first musical theatre – Three Women (based on Tagore's sister-in-law Kadambari Devi) is a dramatic comedy which created a sensation in both India and overseas. The second musical theatre dramatic comedy production Sundays with Chitra and Chaitali, which is based on the story of Chitra in the Mahabharata created an equal sensation. The soundtrack for this has been done by Pritam.

Reviewing her play, Sundays with Chitra and Chaitali, Purba Dutt of Times of India said, In the hands of director Isheeta Ganguly, the past and the present blend beautifully to form a continuum where situations change but the crux remains the same and as relevant now as it was then, a few thousand years ago.

Her third production Shakuntala Awaits, features Indian American actors Samrat Chakrabarti, Purva Bedi and is scheduled to be featured in an off broadway run in January 2022 at the Here Theatre in New York City.

=== Films ===
As a screenwriter and director, as of 2021 Ganguly had two films in development in the US which are adaptations of her plays, Three Women and Shakuntala Awaits.

== Discography ==
=== Albums ===
Year	Albums's Name	Label	Artist(s)
2007	Nutan Jouboner Dut	Saregama	Isheeta Ganguly
2007	Hits Of 2007 Tagore Songs	Saregama	Isheeta Ganguly
2008	Kabi Pranam	Saregama	Saheb Chatterjee, Isheeta Ganguly, Jayati Chakraborty, Mita Haque
2008	Pather Prodip Jwale	Saregama	Isheeta Ganguly
2009	Ghare Baire	T-Series	Isheeta Ganguly
2010	Damaru I Feel Your Rhythm	Times Music	Isheeta Ganguly
2011	Patriotic Songs Of Rabindranath Tagore	Saregama	Isheeta Ganguly, Kanika Banerjee
2017	Songs On Winter	Saregama	Isheeta Ganguly
2020	Jana Gana Mana	Times Music	Isheeta Ganguly, Dr. Shashi Tharoor

== Personal life ==
She lives in Mumbai with her husband and two sons.
