= Don Bosco Cambodia =

The Don Bosco Foundation of Cambodia (DBFC, in Khmer "សាលាដុនបូស្កូនៅប្រទេសកម្ពុជា") is a Non-profit organization of education founded in Cambodia in 1991 to give technical skill education to youth living in extreme poverty and to facilitate the schooling of marginalized children. The organization was a way to answer the needs of a country in its post-war period of reconstruction. DBFC is a branch of the Salesians of Don Bosco. The United Nations asked to the Salesians in Thailand to attend the children and youth of the Cambodian Refugee camps during the 1980s. DBFC answered this request by opening provisional technical schools in the camps. After the peace agreements, the organization was invited by the Cambodian government to settle in the country. The first printing press in Cambodia after the war, was provided by DBFC in the Don Bosco Technical School of Phnom Penh for the republishing, translating and writing of books and documents of education (during the Khmer Rouge Regime books were destroyed). Many schools were rebuilt in the villages and the Organization gained prestige as the first institution to provide technical education and to offer sponsorship to Cambodian children.

== History ==
The genesis of DBFC started in the Khmer Refugee Camps along the Thai-Cambodian border in the early 80's after the 1979's Vietnamese invasion of the Khmer Rouge Cambodian Regime. The full control of the Khmer refugee camps was taken by the Thai Army that did not allow other foreign organizations to come into the camps for any kind of humanitarian activities. In this issue UN insisted to the Thai government to allow foreign organizations to attend the needs of the Khmer refugees. In 1989 Thailand agreed that the UN could send humanitarian help to refugees and among this was education to children and youth. UN asked the Catholic Church through the Catholic Office for Emergency Relief and Refugees. At its time, the Catholic Church asked the Salesians of Don Bosco in Bangkok to do something in technical education for Cambodian girls and boys of the refugee camps.

The Thai Salesians visited the camps allowed by the Thai Army and opened technical centers among the tension of battles in the area. When the war was over and Cambodia had a more independent government, many Cambodian families from the refugee camps returned to their country and the Don Bosco technical centers were necessary anymore. The experience in the camps attracted the attention of the Royal Government of Cambodia that sent a delegation to Thailand to study the works and ways of education of the Salesians of Don Bosco in that country. In this way, the Salesians were invited in 1991 to settle in Cambodia and open educational works for a country completely destroyed by war.

The government put under the custody of the Salesians an orphanage and provided land in what is today the Phnom Penh Thmey District, near the Phnom Penh International Airport (then now as Pochenton Airport,) to build the first technical school that was completed in 1993. The lack of books and didactic material, all destroyed during the long war period, made that the Salesians gave importance to the printing workshops which supplied the first printing press of the country in the post-war period. The success of the first years of technical education provided by Don Bosco led the Cambodian government to give other lands for educational purposes to the Salesians in Battambang and Sihanoukville. At the same time, the Salesian Sisters joined the project in Cambodia by opening vocational training centers in Phnom Penh. As many young boys and girls came to the technical centers with a poor academic background (by 1999 only 30% of children had basic education due to the lack of schools in most part of the country), DBFC created the Children Fund with the intention to build schools in villages and support an intensive program of sponsorship for children. A technical school was opened in 1997 in Sihanoukville, a literacy center and children home was opened in Poipet in 2004. Other literacy centers were opened in Battambang for labor children of the brick factories in the intention of freeing them from factory life and providing an opportunity for a normal school situation. On February 12, 2007 His Majesty, Norodom Sihamoni, visited the Don Bosco Technical School in Sihanoukville, inaugurated the Don Bosco Hotel School in that city and thanked DBFC for its presence in the reconstruction of Cambodia. In 2011 DBFC opened a new technical school and children fund's branch in Kep province. Through the children fund, Don Bosco educative and protection projects reach all Cambodian provinces supporting children and youth from rural and indigenous communities, as well as children who are physically challenged.

== Development ==
As an NGO, the DBFC is a project with assignment agreement to the Cambodia Ministries. Its primary purpose is to provide basic education and appropriate technical training to orphaned and marginalized youth that are poor and have no sources of support. These children will be prepared for the job market and for future integration in the society. The new situation of today's Cambodia challenges the Salesian priests, brothers and lay educators to find new initiatives. As a result of poverty, many children were denied access to basic education and therefore, to professional and technical education. Therefore, since 1991 the Don Bosco Foundation of Cambodia has evolved into a new style of salesian presence.

Under a grant from July 1995 to December 2001, USAID/Cambodia has provided support to establish and help with the operation costs of four Salesian Vocational Training Schools in Cambodia. During these six and a half years, the Salesians have trained more than 1500 youth. These young people have mastered new knowledge and skills as well as developed attitudes suitable for the dynamic and changing workplace. Presently 1378 students undergo education in basic employable skills required by industries attracted by the new social and economic programs and strategies of Cambodia. The Technical Schools and Training Centers in Phnom Penh, Sihanoukville, Battambang and Poipet are still in the process of expanding and developing. The improving of human resources through guided and structured learning activities, provide students with practical know-how and skills by the use of developing training plans, curricula/modules, and/or methods used in the actual training activities.

The local job market demand for Don Bosco Technical School graduates is very encouraging with almost 100% of the yearly trainees finding employment even before their graduation. However, DBFC must strive to secure good jobs and improve employment position through supervised learning method while in school environment with three competitive plus skills factors: Computer, Internet Access and Agriculture/Farming in order to practice appropriate work concepts and skills in improving their training tasks. Don Bosco has also contributed to the technical education in Cambodia by providing translations of technical books into Khmer Language and publishing them.

As a direct result of poverty many children were denied access to primary and secondary education, the Don Bosco Foundation of Cambodia offers scholarships to enable these children to go to school and receive education under the Don Bosco Children Fund.

To meet the needs of children living and working in Bricks Factories in Battambang, Don Bosco Literacy Center has two literacy centers to educate 210 children through an intensive three-year curriculum after which they are reintegrated into government formal high school curriculum.

In response to the HIV/AIDS epidemic in Cambodia, around 450 AIDS orphans and/or children living in AIDS affected families are offered support in order to access to education and health care.

In addition to helping members from the poorest elements of a society, the Salesians have always had a special concern for homeless youth, orphans and young people in difficulties. The Don Bosco Literacy and Skills Training Center Project to support street children and disadvantaged youth in Poipet (border town with Thailand) is a strategy to fight social evil, promote basic education, and improve the life chances of the children and disadvantaged youth.

It is a traditional element in Don Bosco Presences to have a place for more informal education through the Salesian Youth Movement style of seminars, scouting, retreats and youth centers. Don Bosco Youth Center- Kep provides these services.
