= Truth Commission (disambiguation) =

A truth commission, or truth and reconciliation commission, is tasked with discovering and revealing past wrongdoing by a government.

Truth commission may also refer to:

- Historical Truth Commission, the Presidential Commission of the Russian Federation to Counter Attempts to Falsify History to the Detriment of Russia's Interests (2009–2012)
- The Truth Commission, a professional wrestling stable
- Truth Commission (Chad), a 1990–1992 investigation of abuses during the tenure of former President Hissène Habré

== See also ==
- Truth and Reconciliation Commission (disambiguation), bodies around the world using this name
- Truth-seeking, the general process of societies examining past crimes in order to prevent their repetition in the future
- List of truth and reconciliation commissions
