= Beat Richner =

Swiss pediatrician, cellist and founder of children's hospitals in Cambodia

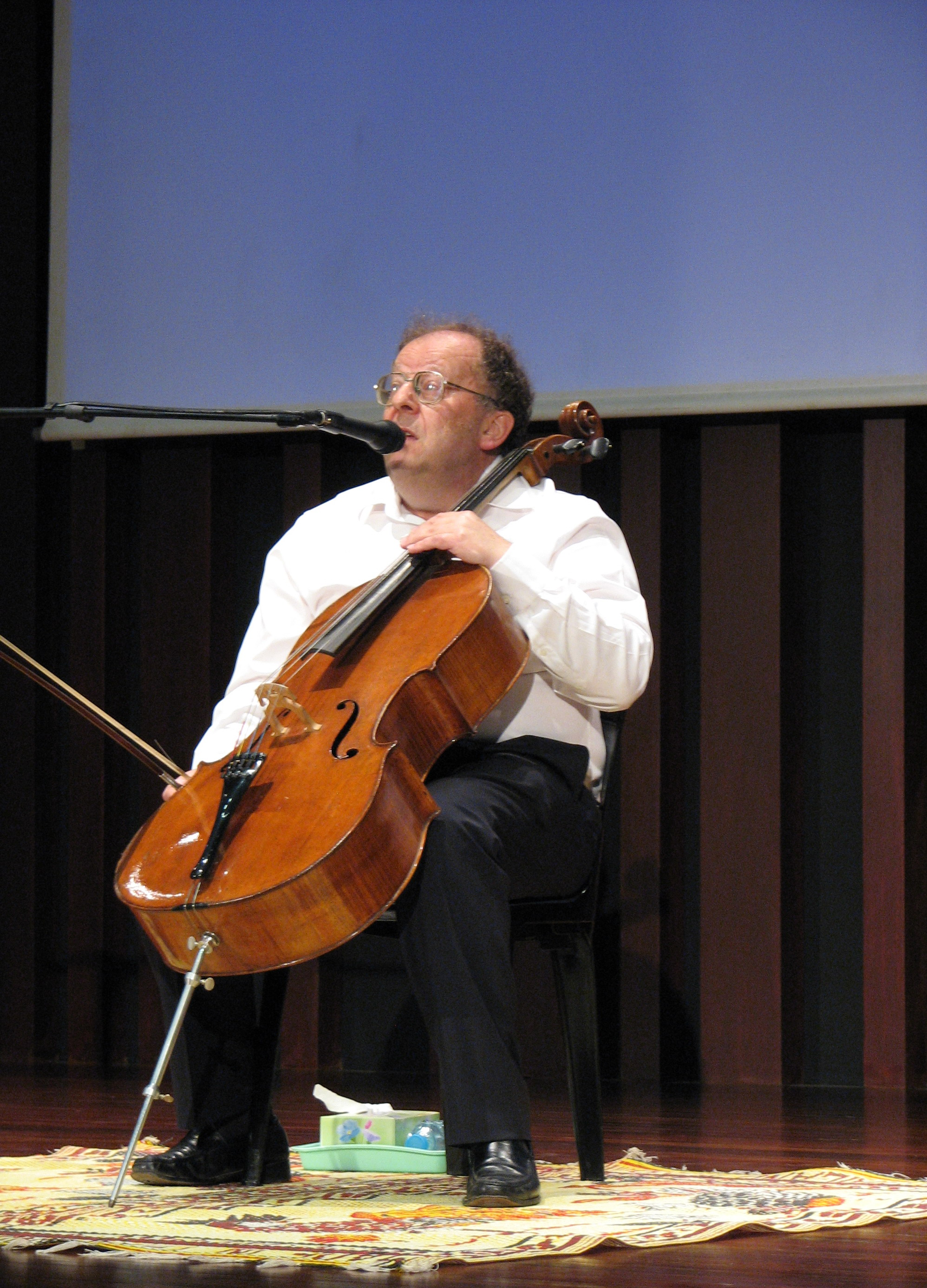
Beat Richner

Beat Richner (13 March 1947 – 9 September 2018) was a Swiss pediatrician, cellist and founder of children's hospitals in Cambodia. He created the Kantha Bopha Foundation in Zürich in 1992 and became its head. Along with another expatriate, he oversaw and ran the predominantly Cambodian-staffed hospitals. As both a cellist and a medical doctor, Richner was known by patients, audiences, and donors as "Beatocello".

== Career ==
Richner was born on 13 March 1947 in Zürich. After receiving his medical degree in 1973, Richner specialized in pediatric care at the Zürich Children's Hospital. Following this, working for the Swiss Red Cross, he was sent to Cambodia where he worked at the Kantha Bopha Children's Hospital in Phnom Penh in 1974 and 1975. The hospital is named in memory of HRH Samdach Preah Ang Mechas Norodom Kantha Bopha (1948–1952), who was the daughter of King Norodom Sihanouk and died at a very young age. When the Khmer Rouge overran Cambodia, Richner was forced to return to Switzerland where he continued his work at the Zürich Children's Hospital. In the process of pursuing his medical career and an interest in music and entertainment, Dr. Richner developed the character of "Beatocello", an artistic and comedic clown who played the cello. Along with this persona, Richner also published many children's books based on "Beatocello".

In December 1991 Richner returned to Cambodia and saw the devastation that had taken place following the ensuing conflicts with the Khmer Rouge and Vietnam. He was asked to re-open and re-build Kantha Bopha by the Cambodian government. Creating the Kantha Bopha Foundation in March 1992, Richner officially returned to Cambodia to begin reconstruction and Kantha Bopha was reopened in November 1992. Since then, the foundation has funded the expansion of Kantha Bopha Children's Hospitals to include five hospitals in total.

As "Beatocello", Richner performed free concerts at the Jayavarman VII hospital in Siem Reap on Thursday and Saturday nights, during the high season. The evenings included songs, played on his cello, and talks on the health crisis in Cambodia. He asked the young tourists for blood, the older tourists for money, and the ones in between for both. Richner and his work in Cambodia were also the subject of six documentary films by Georges Gachot: Bach at the Pagoda (1997), And the Beat Goes On (1999), Depardieu goes for Beatocello (2002), Money or Blood (2004), "15 Years of Kantha Bopha" (2007), "Beatocello's Umbrella" (2012) . In 2006, the documentary "Dr Beat and The Passive Genocide of Children" by Australian film maker Janine Hosking was produced.

Richner waged war on the large aid agencies, claiming that their policies of poor health care for poor people in poor countries are both illogical and immoral.

Richner was named "Swiss of the Year" in 2002.

He died of a serious illness on 9 September 2018 aged 71.

== Kantha Bopha ==
The five children's hospitals built by Richner and the Kantha Bopha Foundation are located in Cambodia's major cities. All of the hospitals provide treatment free of charge. Kantha Bopha I and II can be found in Phnom Penh and Jayavarman VII in Siem Reap. Kantha Bopha IV was opened in Phnom Penh in December 2005 and is connected to Kantha Bopha I. The 5th hospital, the most recent construction, opened in December 2007 (also in Phnom Penh).

Kantha Bopha II was inaugurated on 12 October 1996. The hospital was constructed because of an apparent need caused by overcrowding in Kantha Bopha I. Land was donated by King Norodom Sihanouk. Jayavarman VII, constructed in 1998, similarly was constructed on land donated by Prime Minister Hun Sen. The commissioning of this hospital came from the initiative of Cham Prasidh, the minister of commerce. The hospital is located near Angkor Wat and has health education facilities as well inpatient and outpatient care. On 9 October 2001 a maternity ward for HIV infected mothers was added to Jayavarman VII and includes 350 hospital beds. In 2004, construction of Kantha Bopha IV began to offset structural and capacity issues of Kantha Bopha I. Built in connection to the first hospital, Kantha Bopha IV stands near the famous Wat Phnom in the capital city. Richner's funding and donation campaign for this hospital raised US$15 million. The campaign "Aktion Zwaenzger Noetli 2004" was primarily done in Switzerland.

The Kantha Bopha hospitals treat half a million children per year free of charge. Approx 100,000 seriously ill children are admitted. Japanese encephalitis, malaria, dengue fever and typhoid are common, often exacerbated by the presence of TB. TB is the number one killer. Mortality rate is an astonishingly low 1%. Richner says that over 80% of all paediatric health care in Cambodia is provided by his hospitals.

The hospitals are primarily funded by donations from individuals in Switzerland. Operational expense in 2006 was in the order of US$17m. Since the Foundation started in 1991, it has reportedly raised US$370 million.

In addition to medical care, the hospitals also provide an International Postgraduate Course. The Kantha Bopha Academy for Pediatrics was started in 2009. The program includes lectures and courses on general pediatrics, infectology, immunology and diagnostic imaging. The course program also includes an introduction into the organization and management of a children's hospital and maternity facilities in a poor tropical country.

== Works ==
- Kantha Bopha. Als Schweizer Arzt in Kambodscha ("Kantha Bopha: A children's doctor in Cambodia"), 1995, ISBN 3-85823-570-9 (How the re-opening of Kantha Bopha was made possible and why it is successful)
- Hoffnung für die Kinder von Kantha Bopha, NZZ 2004, ISBN 3-03823-047-2
- Hope for the children of Kantha Bopha: our third hospital, maternity ward, training and conference centre, translated from German, NZZ 2004, ISBN 3-03823-098-7
