= Truth and reconciliation in Myanmar =

Examination of human rights abuses in Myanmar

Truth and reconciliation in Myanmar refers to the examination of human rights abuses in Myanmar, particularly involving those suffered by the Rohingya people. From a coup d’état in 1962 to a general election in 2010, Myanmar (previously known as Burma) was controlled by a military regime. The junta was officially dissolved in 2011 into a civilian government, but there are lasting effects from the decades of military rule. Currently, the income gap in Myanmar is one of the largest in the world, and there are claims that many members of the previous regime continue to hold positions of power. In 2012, U.N. Special Rapporteur Tomas Ojea Quintana called on the creation of a truth commission by Myanmar to look into the human rights abuses committed by the previous government's rule. Quintana also called for an "independent and credible investigation" into the conflict between the Rakhine Buddhists and the Rohingya Muslim minority. In 2015, the Network for Human Rights Documentation Burma (ND-Burma) came out with a report that called for the acknowledgement and reparation for both crimes committed under the military junta, and the abuses currently ongoing.

== Background ==
=== Military rule (1962–2010) ===
The military rule in Myanmar was established by a coup d’état in 1962, replacing the civilian government that had been in power since Burmese independence in 1948. The country was ruled by martial law for the following twelve years until the constitution of 1974, at which point the government became a civilian-military hybrid. The military once again took full control of the government in 1988 and retained it until 2011. There were a few protests throughout the early years of military rule, all of which were suppressed through force. In 1988, protests in favour of democracy known as the 8888 Uprising spread through the nation and thousands of protesters were killed in an attempt to stamp it out. General Saw Maung then staged another coup d'état and implemented a period of martial law.

In 2007, the rise in prices diesel and petrol prices resulted in the Saffron Revolution, which was once more violently suppressed by the government with the reported killing of many unarmed monks who were leading the protest.

=== Rohingya crisis ===
Under the 1982 Myanmar nationality law, Rohingya people are legally denied citizenship and do not have a path to gain it. With this lack of citizenship they also are denied freedom of movement and face difficulty finding access to medical care, jobs, and education.

In late 2016, Burmese police and armed forces began a suppression of the Rohingya people who reside in the northwestern Rakhine State after an attack on several police border posts in October left several dead. The following crackdown involved "unlawful killings, multiple rapes and the burning down of houses and entire villages" all targeted against the Rohingya people.

A refugee crisis was sparked by this persecution, with many Rohingya crossing into bordering nations. It is estimated that between August and December 2017, 625 000 refugees fled from Rakhine into Bangladesh.

== International response ==
The previous UN High Commissioner for Human Rights, Zeid Raad Al Hussein, described the military crackdown against the Rohingya people as "a textbook example of ethnic cleansing" and claimed it may constitute genocide. British Prime Minister Theresa May agreed with the description of ethnic cleansing, and French President Emmanuel Macron described it as genocide.

Many governments committed to monetary amounts for aid for the Rohingya, including the Japanese, Canadian, and Australian governments. Others, such as the Indonesian and Malaysian governments, have sent planes full of relief supplies to the Rohingya camps.

In September 2018, the Canadian parliament unanimously voted to revoke the honorary Canadian citizenship from Myanmar leader Aung San Suu Kyi as a response to the ongoing human rights violations against the Rohingya.

== Calls for transitional justice ==
With the Rohingya crisis still ongoing, most calls for transitional justice and reconciliation in Myanmar are in regards to the previous military government. Asia Justice and Rights (AJAR) believes that the rapid amount of change occurring in Myanmar provides opportunity for a positive shift in regards to rule of law and human rights. AJAR is also currently working with victims and developing initiatives in Myanmar to prevent mass torture and bring accountability for torture that took place in the past. Even before the dissolution of the military junta in 2011, there was discussion amongst activists about the use of transitional justice to usher in a smoother transition to democracy. A system of qualified amnesty was suggested as incentive for officials to agree to this process of transitional justice. One report concedes that although transitional justice may not be possible at this moment in time, "now is the time to start laying robust foundations by boosting data gathering and promoting popular awareness".

In July 2018, Myanmar created a commission of inquiry to investigate the alleged abuses against the Rohingya. The panel is composed of two local and two international commissioners. Human Rights Watch has raised doubts about the possible outcome of this commission, citing the fact that one of the local commissioners (Aung Tun Thet) has previously denied the existence of any ethnic cleansing in Myanmar. The chairwoman of the commission, Rosario Manalo of the Philippines, also created some concern about the inquiry for those hoping for accountability when she stated there would be "no blaming of anybody".

Amnesty International released a report in June 2018 that documents numerous human rights abuses, and proceeded to call for Myanmar to be referred to the International Criminal Court (ICC). On 27 September 2018, the UN Human Rights Council passed a resolution to create an international body to "help prepare case files for future criminal proceedings". This resolution was the result of a UN fact finding mission that discovered numerous human rights abuses under the military junta, and currently ongoing against the Rohingya.
