= Jonathan Hollander =

American dancer and founder of the Battery Dance Company

Jonathan Hollander (born June 18, 1951) is an American dancer, choreographer, educator, and artistic director. He founded the Battery Dance Company in New York City in 1976, opening the Battery Dance Studio that same year. He also founded the Downtown Dance Festival, held annually in New York City since 1982. Since 2008, the Downtown Dance Festival has included the Erasing Borders Festival of Indian Dance. As a dance educator, Hollander has been active in bringing dance into the public schools; and is known for the award-winning "Dancing to Connect" program. He is also known for his ties to India, and for presenting and promoting Indian dancers in New York. He is a co-founder of the Indo-American Arts Council.

== Early life and education ==
Hollander is the son of Joan Wolman Hollander, a pianist, and Bernard Moses Hollander, an anti-trust attorney employed by the United States Department of Justice. The dancer was born in Washington, D.C., and grew up in Chevy Chase, Maryland, where he studied piano for 13 years with Robert Parris, Charles Crowder and Ylda Novik. He studied folk dancing as a child at the Chilmark Community Center in Chilmark, Massachusetts; and received his first theatrical experience at the Interlochen National Music Camp, in Interlochen, Michigan, where he performed in a production staged by American choreographer Carolyn Carlson. Hollander traveled to India in 1968 as an American Field Service Exchange Student, where he was first exposed to Indian dance in the class of Parvati Kumar. He began his own, formal dance training while a student at the University of California Irvine, where he studied with Eugene Loring, James Penrod and Janice Plastino.

== Career ==
Hollander left college to pursue a dance career in New York City. There his teachers included Merce Cunningham, Margaret Craske, Dan Wagoner, Dianna Byer, Janet Panetta, and Ann Parson at the Joffrey Ballet School. He first performed for choreographer Twyla Tharp in 1971; and danced with the New York Dance Collective from 1971 to 1975, before launching his own studio and dance troupe in 1976. The studio was located at 54 Stone Street in New York City from 1976 to 1984; and is currently at 380 Broadway. Battery Dance Company is considered a pioneer in expanding New York's arts scene to lower Manhattan. "Cultural activity first surfaced on Wall Street in the early 1970s. Two avant-garde groups, Battery Dance Company and Creative Time,..were founded in lower Manhattan to take advantage of the vacuum of contemporary art and the potential audience of some 500,000 people."

In addition to offering dance classes, the Battery Dance Studio has been the site of salon events featuring such notable Indian artists as Mallika Sarabhai; the Jhaveri Sisters; Sandip Mallick; and Nirupana and Rajendra. The Battery Dance Company has also presented such notable artists as C.V. Chandrasekhar; Tero Saarinen; and Tommi Kitti, and has played host to K. Jayan, Isheeta Ganguly, and the Silesian Dance Theatre of Poland. Swapnasundari and her troupe of Kathakali dancers appeared at the Downtown Dance Festival, making their New York debut. The Janavak National Folk Dance Troupe of India toured the United States in 2001 under the auspices of Battery Dance Company.

Hollander spent three months in India as a Fulbright Lecturer on Dance in 1992, during which time he deepened his connections to the Indian dance community. He taught workshops at the Darpana and Kadamb Institutions in Ahmedabad, M.S. University in Baroda, Nalanda Dance Institute and NCPA in Mumbai; and his company undertook a six-city tour of India. The following year he organized the American debut and tour of the Jhaveri Sisters, renowned exponents of Manipuri Dance. In 1995, Hollander curated "PURUSH: Expressions of Man," a program celebrating male performers representing various classical Indian dance styles including Bharata Natyam, Kathak, Kuchipudi, and Kathakali. This program made its debut at The Music Centre in Chennai; appeared at the Lincoln Center Out-of-Doors Festival; and undertook an 18-city tour of the United States. He has organized various conferences, seminars and town-hall meetings related to Indian dance.

The Battery Dance Company tours nationally and internationally, sometimes as a cultural ambassador under the auspices of the U.S. State Department. It has appeared at such notable venues as Lincoln Center for the Performing Arts in New York City; the Beijing International Modern Dance Festival; Taipei Arts Festival; Open Look Festival in St. Petersburg; Stockholm's Moderna Museet; Hyogo Performing Arts Center in Japan; Cultural Center of the Philippines; National Center for the Performing Arts, in Mumbai; and others.

== Choreographic works ==
Hollander has created more than 75 dances in the course of his career, including the following:

- Travelers (1992)
- Moonbeam (1992)
- Anyone's Ballet (1992) with a commissioned score by Ricky Ian Gordon
- Seen by a River (1993)
- Through a Prism
- Testimony (1994)
- Songs of Tagore (1995) featuring guest artist Mallika Sarabhai
- Purush (1995)
- Layapriya (1997)
- Mother Goose (2000), with a commissioned score by Finnish composer Frank Carlberg
- A Passage to India: the Sequel (2001)
- Notebooks (2003), with a commissioned score by F. Carlberg
- Shell Games (2005), with a commissioned score by F. Carlberg
- Voice Hearers (2009), to a score by Meredith Monk
- Shakti: a Return to the Source (2016), featuring guest artist Unnath H.R.

== Social activism ==
On a 2014 tour of India, Battery Dance Company worked with survivors of human trafficking and gender violence, supporting the efforts of EmancipAction and Aspen Institute's Ananta Centre.

== Honors and awards ==
Encore Award, Arts & Business Council, 1981

Bundesverdienstkreuz, Order of Merit of the Federal Republic of Germany, 2018
