= Dhammika =

Dhammika is both a given name and a surname. Notable people with the name include:

- Dhammika Dasanayake, Sri Lankan civil servant
- Dhammika Dharmapala (born 1969/1970), Sri Lankan economist
- Dhammika Ganganath Dissanayake (1958–2020), Sri Lankan professor
- Dhammika Kitulgoda, Sri Lankan civil servant
- Dhammika Niroshana (1983–2024), Sri Lankan cricketer
- Dhammika Perera (born 1967), Sri Lankan billionaire businessman
- Dhammika Prasad (born 1983), Sri Lankan cricketer
- Dhammika Siriwardana (1954–2015), Sri Lankan film director
- Dhammika Sudarshana (born 1976), Sri Lankan cricketer
- Ranil Dhammika (born 1980), Sri Lankan cricketer
- Sriyani Dhammika Menike (born 1970), Sri Lankan middle-distance runner

== See also ==
- Dhammika Sutta, sutta
