= Truth and Reconciliation in Cambodia =

The Truth and Reconciliation process in Cambodia refers to efforts to create other truth-seeking and reconciliation mechanisms in the country, in addition to the hybrid tribunals established by the Cambodian government and the United Nations in 2001.

== Background ==
Between 1975 and 1979, a fifth of Cambodia's (then called Democratic Kampuchea) population—totaling one to two million people—was killed by the Khmer Rouge. During the twenty years which followed, there was a general resistance to “digging up past horrors”. The country and new government chose not to participate in official truth-seeking during the transitional period and Cambodians in general showed little interest in speaking about that era.

However, once the last of the regime had been overthrown in 1999, Cambodians began to show an increased interest in learning their past and uncovering the truth of the Khmer Rouge regime. It was decided that justice would be sought through retributive trials. In 2001, the Cambodian National Assembly passed a law on the establishment of the Extraordinary Chambers in the Courts of Cambodia for the Prosecution of Crimes Committed during the Period of Democratic Kampuchea. These hybrid tribunals enacted jointly by the Cambodian government and the United Nations were not expected to be a final solution, but they were a departure point. This move towards justice acknowledged both the surviving and lost Cambodian victims, and proved that the past would not be forgotten, or diminished. Rather, the past was to be addressed “slowly and unevenly”.

== Tribunals ==
In 2001, the Cambodian National Assembly passed a law to create a court which would try the offenders of the most serious crimes during the regime. The court was named the “Extraordinary Chambers in the Courts of Cambodia”. The E.C.C.C's goals were to include justice, truth, and national reconciliation. However, in order to achieve these goals, the Cambodian population will need to understand not only their history, but what the trials themselves involve. The trials “need to mean something to these people”, especially to those living outside the capital.

The E.C.C.C. report states that “it is hoped that fair trials will ease the burden that weighs on the survivors”. It wants the trials to be viewed as important for those remembering the past, but also for those confronting the future, especially younger generations learning Cambodian history. This hybrid court run by both Cambodian and international judges had (and continues to have) lofty goals, and only began its proceedings nearly a decade after the 1997 UN offer of help and the official 1998 end to the Khmer Rouge. The population's increasing interest in justice for the Khmer Rouge permitted Cambodia to begin “a long-delayed conversation about its traumatic past”.

== Role of International Community ==
Despite resistance against the Khmer Rouge during the Cold War, most Western governments recognized the Khmer Rouge as part of the Coalition Government of Democratic Kampuchea (which temporarily took Cambodia's United Nations seat) during the 1980s and early 1990s. Since the fall of the Khmer Rouge, it has been the international community (mostly ‘leftist academics’) that has led attempts at justice for the ruling group and its members. In the 1970s, Australian Southeast-Asian historian Ben Kiernan had already begun the process of interviewing Cambodian survivors and publishing their accounts of the Khmer Rouge occupation. In the 1980s he translated these accounts and other official documents into English. Kiernan's advocacy continued in 1994 when United States Congress passed the “genocide justice act” and he was given a $500,000 grant by the US Department of State to continue to investigate the Cambodian Genocide. Though initially not supported by Cambodians, this project lead to the development of the Cambodian Genocide Program (CGP), and the 1995 creation of the Documentation Center of Cambodia in Phnom Penh. This documentation center has been called the “most impressive and organized effort” in the exploration of past Khmer Rouge atrocities. Now an independent research institute, the documentation center collects, catalogues, and stores documents from Democratic Kampuchea. For example, maps site of execution centers and mass graves and 50000-100000 pages of official Khmer documents found in a warehouse in Phnom Penh. This documentation center is publicly accessible and is now managed by trained Cambodian scholars and archivists.

International actors were also responsible for setting the “Extraordinary Chambers in the Courts of Cambodia” in motion. In 1999, the United Nations experts published a report to UN Secretary-General Kofi Annan regarding the Cambodian genocide, recommending an international tribunal to judge past Khmer Rouge crimes. At the same time, responding to the wishes of the Cambodian people, Prime Minister Hun Sen suggested a truth commission in conjunction with trials and considered inviting Desmond Tutu (of the South African truth commission) to Cambodia. Hun Sen's proposition was supported by the UN, but was considered too dangerous for the average Cambodian as many Khmer Rouge members were still dispersed throughout society. Finally, in 2003, the Cambodian government and the UN signed an official agreement to begin a special tribunal for senior members of Khmer Rouge. By 2006, the tribunal was operating and five suspects had been brought into custody. With the trials beginning within a year, there was a new focus on Cambodian history and the Khmer Rouge rule.

== Debates Surrounding Truth Processes ==
=== Resistance ===
Resistance to the investigation into Cambodia's past was led not only by the Cambodian government (and by many Cambodian citizens), but also by the international community. Processes of reconciliation in post-conflict countries such as Cambodia require the careful consideration of many levels of society. There is a complex relationship between poverty, corruption, and mistrust. Many were skeptical that the E.C.C.C and the Cambodian government could enact trials “fair, transparent, and accessible to the public”. Scholar Jorg Menzel also expressed sentiments of skepticism asserting that “a trial will not cure them at all” but instead “might be somewhat dangerous shock therapy as trials bring memories back and force people to reflect [on] their past”.

During Ben Kiernan's work with the CGP, he faced both Western and Eastern resistance. Kiernan says the success of the CGP was achieved “under fire” and that he was “threatened by the West’s most powerful newspaper” (the Wall Street Journal). In an editorial for the Wall Street Journal, released on the 20th anniversary of the Khmer Rouge's seizure of power, Harvard's Stephen J. Morris denounced the CGP and called its director (Kiernan) a “communist” and a Khmer Rouge sympathizer. He subsequently asked Congress to revoke the $500,000 grant given to Kiernan and the CGP. In his book, Kiernan discusses the resistance to his work, citing genocide denial in three main points. He says there is outright denial that a genocide occurred in Cambodia under Khmer rule, a defense rooted in a technicality of definition—whether it was really a genocide or not, and lastly, the act of suppressing research programs and other initiatives investigating Khmer Rouge crimes. He says “genocide” is still disputed by several prominent Cambodian historians, both inside and outside of the country.

=== Searching for Justice ===
As justice efforts unfold, it is wondered whether judicial processes will help with Cambodia's reconciliation. Is a corrupt and weak government equipped to deliver justice? Many survivors of the Khmer Rouge regime also wonder whether the judicial processes at E.C.C.C are enough, or even the best way to encourage reconciliation in Cambodia. In a poll it was found that over 80% of Cambodians want justice for the Khmer Rouge leaders, however most said they simply want to know why and how the tragedies happened. They wanted an acknowledgement of responsibility. In tribunals such as the E.C.C.C, one cannot hold all responsible accountable. It is difficult to equate millions of Cambodians who suffered to the imprisonment of select few Khmer leaders. That said, these tribunals are a form of symbolic justice. To go hand-in-hand with these tribunals, it has been recommended that Cambodia focus on simultaneous restorative justice. The combination is seen as necessary for successful transitional justice. The possibility of a truth commission in Cambodia has been considered, and its strengths, weaknesses, and feasibility taken into account. A truth commission would allow all those who told the truth to forgot prosecution, and those who refused, to face it. This form of justice would provide a more complete version of truth, and would permit the quicker resurfacing of past tragedies. The E.C.C.C method is, unfortunately, slower and allows thousands to go without consequence.

=== Criticism ===
The Khmer Rouge Tribunals were said to be the most anticipated trials since the 1945-1946 Nuremberg trials. Finally, people would people be able to ask the Khmer Rouge: “why?”. However, the tribunals are problematic for several reasons: there is clear obstruction and corruption on behalf of the government, and most of all, because many low-level Khmer Rouge leaders are still in office today. The politics of country and the past of those in power inhibit justice. There are no “clean hands” in Cambodia (or in the international community for that matter- all great powers played some role in the war). The impunity received by Khmer Rouge members, and their continued involvement in government is problematic. Critics argue that it sends the wrong message to the Cambodian public and discredits the justice process.

Reconciliation therefore is difficult for Cambodians. Many survivors are still trying to forget their past, while those who want answers are hassled by the state. The goal of international justice is to ‘right wrongs of the past’. Yet, this is more difficult in a country where the past still lingers in the present day. As the tribunals unfold, it is evident that Khmer Rouge leaders believed their actions to be necessary and claim they were just “following orders”. During trial, there is no remorse in their words: they describe the Cambodian population as pests to be exterminated’ and blame the dead leader of Democratic Kampuchea, Pol Pot, for their crimes. In 8 years, the E.C.C.C has produced only one verdict: that of Comrade Duch (really Kaing Guek Eav) who oversaw Tuol Sleng prison where 15,000+ Cambodians were tortured and executed. He was found guilty for crimes against humanity, and was sentenced to life in prison.

== Truth and Reconciliation ==
In 1994, the UN speculated that it was unlikely that the Cambodian government would hold the Khmer Rouge accountable. Over the course of the 1990s, this proved to be right. It is possible that Cambodians remained silent because their fear of the topic and the Buddhist/Cambodian tendency to not “confront conflict”, but also because they simply wanted to forget the past. In 1998 Cambodia chose not to participate in official truth-seeking at time of nationwide transition. Since Cambodians wanted to “get on with what [was] left of the rest of their lives”, the prime minister chose to “dig a hole and bury the past”.

Doung & Ear write that transitional justice requires a “political commitment from the succeeding regime”, as well as “time and resources with consideration of local cultures and religion, victim participation and scale of atrocity”. Cambodia of the late 1990s was not in a place to adhere to these requirements. Present-day Cambodia continues to face “poverty and corruption” which fueled a “sense of injustice and mistrust in the current government”, and in society.

However, even though the prime minister chose to “bury the past”, Cambodia still remained divided into two camps: the victims and the perpetrators. This division, as well as increasing activism around the subject, slowly increased the desire of Cambodians to learn their past and to know the truths behind the Khmer Rouge. The E.C.C.C tribunals were not expected to completely fulfill these wishes, but they would certainly assist victims seeking out justice.

Cambodian scholars say reconciliation will begin only when “willing to offer forgiveness” is asserted at the “national and community level”. In order for Cambodia to proceed with any meaningful justice (whether restorative or retributive) it must also achieve what is called a “human rights protective culture”. This is a culture where all social, economic, political, and cultural rights—as outlined in the Universal Declaration of Human Rights – are upheld to the best of the state's ability. The state must not be responsible for the violation of its own citizens’ rights. In order to achieve justice, the Cambodian government must also demonstrate its investment in the project. They must be seen fighting to hold the Khmer Rouge accountable. If not, violence will likely continue or worsen. Until then, a truth commission seems unlikely. Experts suggest a “national or community-based truth-telling mechanism” or a type of “truth and healing process” (as part of a larger reparation program).

== Future of Process ==
As years go by, Khmer Rouge leaders are aging, dying, or becoming unfit for trial. The slowness of the process is harmful to the desired outcome of justice. Even though it has been trying on the population, Cambodians want to know the truth, and they want the international community to know how important the truth is as well. In his investigation on genocides, Kiernan says “getting history right has proceeded hand in hand with the quest for justice”. Finally learning the truth and understanding history will hopefully dispel the effects of years of silencing. The truth needs to be known so the story can be told to younger generations. In 2000, half the Cambodian population was post-Khmer Rouge and either did not know or did not believe what had previously occurred in the country. As of 2010, the Khmer Rouge regime was still not being taught in Cambodian classrooms. Cambodians want accurate information to be taught in their schools; they do not want a skewed memory of their history.

The country is thus working towards educational and therapeutic measures, sites and practices of remembrance (such as the National Day of Hatred to commemorate the crimes and the victims of the Khmer Rouge regime), as well as preliminary efforts of restorative justice.

Contemporary Cambodia experiences relative peace (through the work of the international community and local actors). But, this peace is fading over time. Cambodia has become a “shallow democracy”, where there is "negative peace". Despite its efforts, the country continues to face corruption and the numerous human rights violations. Cambodia has begun its truth and reconciliation process, however its past is far from resolved.
