= Kong Panya =

Cambodian politician

Lok Neak Oknha Moha Pheakdey Kong Panya
- គង់ បញ្ញា

Senior Minister in charge of General Affairs of the Ministry of the Royal Palace
- Incumbent
- Assumed office 2 September 2024
- Monarch: Norodom Sihamoni
- Prime Minister: Hun Manet
- Preceded by: Kuy Sophal

Personal details
- Born: 15 February 1981 (age 45) Phnom Penh, Cambodia
- Party: Cambodian People's Party
- Parents: Kong Sam Ol; Thay Var

Kong Panya (Khmer: គង់ បញ្ញា), is a Cambodian politician who served as the senior minister in charge of general affairs of the Ministry of the Royal Palace of Cambodia in 2024. She was the Advisor to the Ministry of the Royal Palace of Cambodia with the rank equivalent to Senior Minister and was the Secretary of State of the Ministry of the Royal Palace until 2 September 2024. Her official title is Lok Neak Oknha Moha Pheakdey Kong Panya (Khmer: លោកអ្នកឧកញ៉ា មហាភក្ដី គង់ បញ្ញា).
