= Kong Sam Ol =

Cambodian statesman and court official (1929–2024)

Samdech Chaufea Veang Vorakveangchey Athippadey Sroengkea Kong Sam Ol
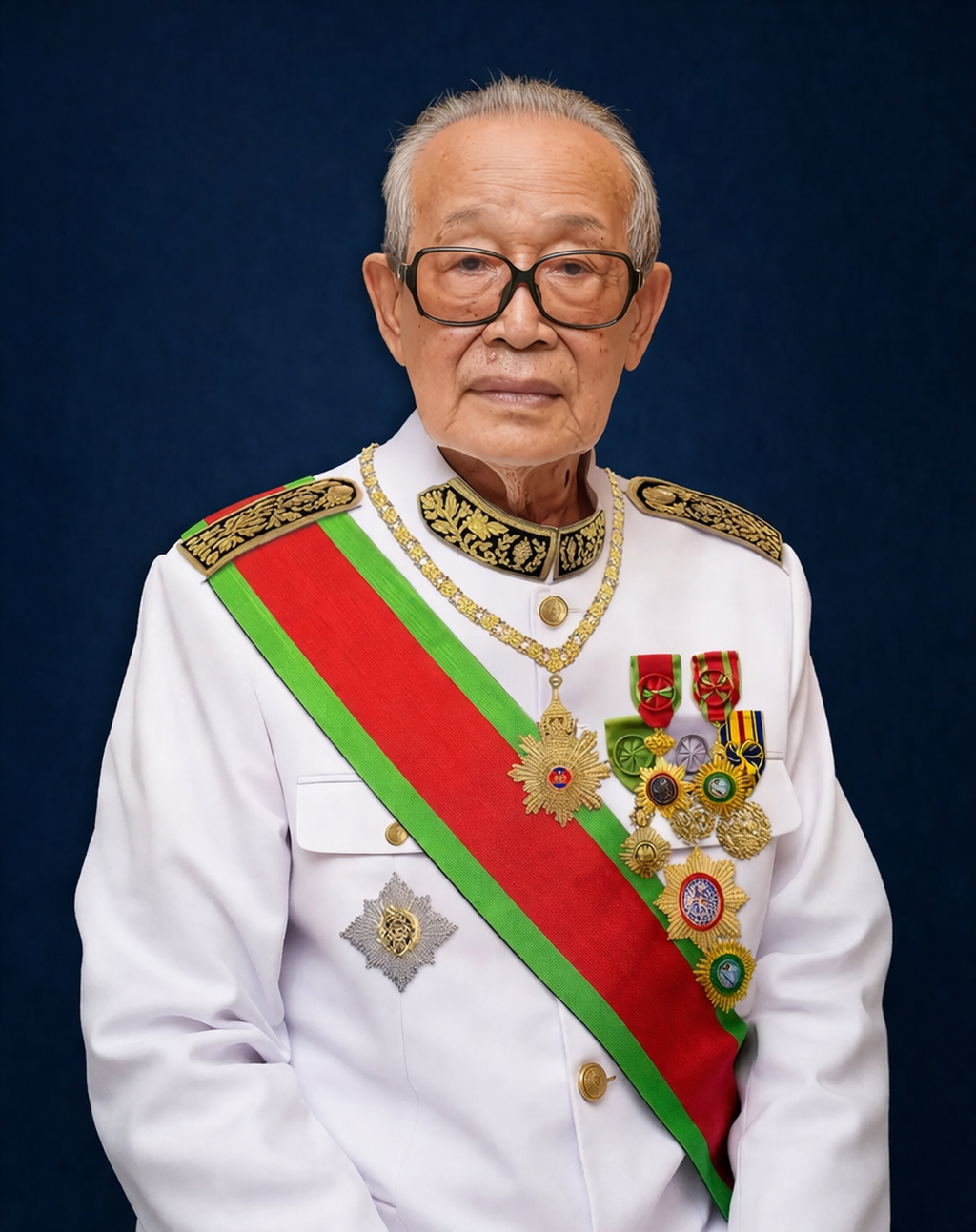
- Official portrait, RGC

Deputy Prime Minister of Cambodia
- In office 2 July 1990 – 2 September 2024
- Monarchs: Norodom Sihanouk; Norodom Sihamoni
- Prime Minister: Hun Manet; Hun Sen; Norodom Ranariddh
- Preceded by: Office established
- Succeeded by: Kuy Sophal

Permanent Deputy Prime Minister of Cambodia
- In office 20 September 1990 – 2 July 1993
- Monarch: Norodom Sihanouk
- Prime Minister: Hun Sen
- Preceded by: Office established
- Succeeded by: Sok An
Ministerial offices
Minister of the Royal Palace
In office 30 November 1998 – 2 September 2024
Prime Minister	Hun Sen
Preceded by	Office established
Succeeded by	Kuy Sophal
Minister-in-charge of the Office of the Council of Ministers
In office 10 September 1990 – 2 July 1993
Prime Minister	Hun Sen
Preceded by	Office established
Succeeded by	Sok An
Minister of Agriculture, Forestry and Fisheries (Note: Kong Sam Ol served as Head of Agriculture from 1979 to 1981, Minister of Agriculture from 1981 to 1985 and Minister-in-charge of agricultural affairs until 1986 when the combined portfolio and full office as Minister of Agriculture, Forestry and Fisheries was established.)
In office 7 January 1979 – 26 September 1989
Prime Minister	Hun Sen
Preceded by	Office established
Succeeded by	Say Chhum
Senior political offices
Member of the Supreme National Council
In office 10 September 1990 – 28 May 1993
Preceded by	Office established
Succeeded by	Office abolished
Vice Chairman of the Council of Ministers
In office 10 September 1990 – 2 July 1993
Prime Minister	Hun Sen
Preceded by	Office established
Succeeded by	Sok An
Parliamentary office
Member of the National Assembly
In office 14 June 1993 – 2 September 2024
Preceded by	Constituency established
Succeeded by	He Virak
Constituency	Kampong Chhnang province

Personal details
- Born: Kong Sam Ol; 1 November 1929 Kangkor, Kandal province, French Protectorate of Cambodia
- Died: 2 September 2024 (aged 94) Phnom Penh, Cambodia
- Resting place: Champouvoan Pagoda, Kampot province
- Party: Cambodian People's Party (CPP) (1993–2024)
- Other political affiliations: Social Republican Party (1972–1975); Kampuchean People's Revolutionary Party (1979–1991)
- Spouse: Thammamongkol Mony Thai Va ()
- Children: 5, including Kong Panya
- Parents: Kong Hin; Sues Kan
- Relatives: Kong family
- Education: Lycée Sisowath; University of Georgia
- Occupation: agronomist; engineer; politician; diplomat
- Awards: Full list

Kong Sam Ol (Note: /kɒŋ sɑːm ʔɒl/; Khmer: កុង សំអុល, UNGEGN: Kóng Sâm'ŏl [koŋ sam ʔol]) (1 November 1929 – 2 September 2024) was a Cambodian politician who served as deputy prime minister and minister of the Royal Palace of Cambodia from 1998 to until his death in 2024. A member of the Cambodia People’s Party, he served in the National Assembly for Kampong Chhnang province from 1993 to 2024.

== Early life: 1929-1979 ==
=== Childhood and schooling: 1929-1956 ===
Kong Sam Ol was born on 1 November 1929 at his family’s residence in Kangkor, Kandal province, French Protectorate of Cambodia. On his father’s side, he was a member of the court aristocracy as a descendant of Oknha Kralahom A. Kong who served as minister of the Navy and was a resistance leader under Prince Si Votha during the anti-French rebellion of 1885–1887. His father, Oknha Kong Hin, was a royal-service official of the Royal Transport Department. His mother was Sues Kan, the daughter of a prominent S'aoch land owner and community leader, was the second consort of his father.

In 1935, Kong enrolled at François Baudoin Primary School in Phnom Penh at age 6 alongside his half-brother Kong Sam and mentored by the senior Keng Vannsak. He studied at Wat Ounalom near the Royal Palace of Cambodia from 1942 to 1944 and attended the primary school at Wat Preah Puth Mean Bon from 1944 to 1945. In 1946, he was assigned studies at Preah Chey Chesda Primary School at which his primary education was finalised in 1950.

Kong studied at Sisowath High School from 1950 to 1955, where he briefly was classmates with various revolutionary figures, such as Khieu Samphan, Hou Yuon, Ieng Thirith, and was known to challenged the ideas of Hu Nim. In 1956, upon passing the second part of the secondary school diploma examination, he sought double enrollment, studying at the Khmer Institut in the mornings and undertook additional paid study at Sisowath High School in the evenings.

=== United States and Japan: 1956–1965 ===
In 1958, Kong was admitted to study agronomy at the University of Georgia in Athens, Georgia and arrived in the United States on 19 December 1960, where he obtained a Bachelor of Science (BSc) in agricultural engineering in 1963. During his studies in the United States, he developed an interest in sculpture and architecture.

Kong had served as an administrative assistant to the United States Information Service (USIS) in Cambodia prior to his departure to the United States in 1960.

In 1963, after to earning his degree, he was a foreign service officer and was trained at two unnamed institution in Washington D.C. as well as Japan.

=== Khmer Rouge: 1975-1980 ===
After the fall of Phnom Penh on 17 April 1975, Kong was captured and subjected to torture by the Khmer Rouge forces before being sent to perform heavy labour in Battambang province until 7 January 1979.

== Minister of Agriculture, Forestry and Fisheries: 1980-1989 ==
In 1979, the Kampuchean People's Revolutionary Council Government, a interim government backed by the Socialist Republic of Vietnam (SRV), appointed Kong to secretary of the Council of Ministers under the premiership of Pen Sovann.

In 1980, as the formal government, called People's Republic of Kampuchea, Kong served in the cabinet as head of agricultural department and undersecretary of state of the Council of Ministers in charge of the ministry of agriculture.

In 1981, Kong was formally appointed as Minister of Agriculture of the newly established People's Republic of Kampuchea as well as senior adviser to the Prime Minister on agricultural affairs and served in this capacity until 1985. During this the 1980s, his influence grew as part of the policy core around food supply and reconstruction with him serving as the vice-president of the Committee for Reception of Humanitarian Aid.

By 1986, Kong was appointed minister attached to the Council of Ministers and minister-in-charge of agricultural affairs by Prime Minister Hun Sen. In 1986, he was assigned the combined portfolio of Minister of Agriculture, Forestry and Fisheries which he maintained until 1989.

== Permanent Deputy Prime Minister and Minister of Cabinet: 1990-1993 ==
In 1990, Kong was appointed as Permanent Deputy Prime Minister and Minister-in-charge of the Office of the Council of Ministers. During this period, he was the vice-chairman of the Council of Ministers and effectively the second-highest ranking government official in Cambodia only behind Prime Minister Hun Sen.

=== Supreme National Council (SNC) of Cambodia: 1990-1991 ===
On 10 September 1990, the Supreme National Council (SNC) of Cambodia was established and Kong was appointed as a member and deputy secretary of the SNC. As a signatory to the 1991 Paris Peace Agreements, signed on 23 October 1991, the SNC was part of negotiating an end to the Cambodian-Vietnamese War. As the vice-president of the Committee for Reception of Humanitarian Aid and the chairman of the National Committee for the Repatriation of Refugees, Kong was a participant in the peace negotiations.

In accordance to the agreement, the SNC permitted the United Nations Transitional Authority in Cambodia (UNTAC) to exercise all its authority on the SNC’s behalf. This included authority over all administrative agencies, bodies and offices acting in foreign affairs, national defence, finance, public security and information.

=== 1993 general elections ===
In the 1993 Cambodian general election, Kong was elected member of the National Assembly, representing Kampong Chhnang province. He retained the seat until his death in 2024. As a permanent committee member of the Cambodian People’s Party (CPP), equivalent to a Politburo-level official, Kong was an influential figure in the drafting of the Constitution of Cambodia in the Constituent Assembly of Cambodia, especially with respect to the creation of a constitutional monarchy, and its adoption on 21 September 1993. The Constitution was signed into law on 24 September 1993 by Sihanouk. In the wake of the election and the establishment of the constitutional monarchy, he was again appointed as Minister of Agriculture, Forestry and Fisheries from 1993 to 1994.

== Minister of the Royal Palace: 1993-2024 ==
In 1993, Kong was also appointed as Senior Minister and Minister of the Royal Palace before King Sihanouk was crowned as monarch. He was appointed to the post with aim to bring the palace under the control of the Cambodian People’s Party (CPP). He attempted to consolidate power by accessing Sihanouk’s minders which would grant him control over the royal schedules and appointment books. The period was described as a power struggle between Kong and Sihanouk.

As Sihanouk abdicated on 6 July 2006, Kong saw that the former North Korean palace guards were replaced by a Cambodians detail, which took orders from CPP appointed officials, granting him absolute authority over the palace grounds.

At the request of Kong, King Sihamoni granted audiences and royal honours to members of the CPP’s inner circle, including tycoons and other influential figures, forming the “elite pact” between private and public sector. This matter became a point of conflict with the Kong and Sihamoni clashing “on a weekly basis” over these impositions, yet Sihamoni did not hold enough power to refuse the requests.

He was responsible for organising the highly publicised funeral of King Sihanouk, where his daughter’s construction company was responsible for the creation of the crematorium. Kong served as the Chairman of the National Committee for Organizing National and International Festivals.

=== Other committees ===
Kong served as chairman of the National Mekong Committee and chairman of the National Committee for Foreign Investment.

=== Cambodian Red Cross ===
In August 2014, Kong was appointed as the permanent vice-president of the Cambodian Red Cross under the tenure of Bun Rany.

=== Position in the Cambodian People’s Party (CPP) ===
Kong served as a permanent committee member of the Cambodian People’s Party (CPP), equivalent to a Politburo-level official, placing him amongst the senior leadership strata.

== Later life ==
Kong Sam Ol was declared dead on 2 September 2024 at the age of 94. His body was placed at a funeral house at 83 Sok Hok Street (107), corner of St. Joseph Pros Tito (214), Sangkat Boeung Prolit, Khan 7 Makara, Phnom Penh, and the Ministry of the Royal Palace invited officials and the public to attend the funeral services.

On 3 September 2024, Prime Minister Hun Manet led a high-level delegation of the Royal Government to lay wreaths and pay tribute, while Senate President Hun Sen led a high-level delegation of the Senate to pay tribute the same day.

In his condolence message, Hun Manet said that Kong had

"always dedicated his physical and intellectual strength, spirit and service in all forms to ensure the protection of national independence, sovereignty and territorial integrity, as well as the defence of the monarchy and the constitutional monarchy in Cambodia […] his [Kong’s] death [is] a great loss not only for the family members, but also for the nation"

— Hun Manet, Prime Minister condolences

Hun Sen described Kong’s death as "a great loss of an exemplary leader" marked by "wisdom, will, scholarly ideals and extensive experience".

== Personal life ==
Kong married Neak Oknha Thammamongkol Mony Thai Va. They remained married until his death.

The couple had children, notably, Mr. Kong Dara who serves as the Undersecretary of State at the Ministry of the Royal Palace, Kong Sanya who serves as Director-General of Calmette Hospital and Lok Neak Oknha Kong Panya who serves as the Senior Minister in charge of General Affairs attached to the Ministry of the Royal Palace.
