= Kuy Sophal =

Cambodian politician

Samdech Moha Montrei Kuy Sophal
- គុយ សុផល

Deputy Prime Minister of Cambodia
- Incumbent
- Assumed office 2 September 2024
- Monarch: Norodom Sihamoni
- Prime Minister: Hun Manet

Minister of the Royal Palace
- Incumbent
- Assumed office 2 September 2024
- Monarch: Norodom Sihamoni
- Prime Minister: Hun Manet
- Preceded by: Kong Sam Ol

Member of the Supreme Privy Council to His Majesty the King
- Monarch: Norodom Sihamoni

Chairman of the National Committee for Organizing National and International Festivals
- Incumbent
- Assumed office 14 October 2024
- Monarch: Norodom Sihamoni
- Preceded by: Kong Sam Ol

Personal details
- Born: 15 October 1956 (age 69) Cheung Teuk, Prey Veng, Prey Veng, Cambodia
- Party: Cambodian People's Party
- Spouse: Sok Neary

Kuy Sophal (Khmer: គុយ សុផល), is a Cambodian politician who served as the Deputy Prime Minister, Minister of the Royal Palace of Cambodia in 2024. He is also the Member of the Supreme Privy Council to His Majesty the King of Cambodia. He was the Senior Minister in charge of General Affairs of the Ministry of the Royal Palace until 2 September 2024. He was appointed Chairman of the National Committee for Organizing National and International Festivals on 14 October 2024. His official title is Samdech Moha Montrei Kuy Sophal (Khmer: សម្តេចមហាមន្ត្រី គុយ សុផល; lit. 'High Lord Officer Kuy Sophal').
