= Royal Palace of Cambodia =

Official residence of the King of Cambodia since the 1860s

- ព្រះបរមរាជវាំង
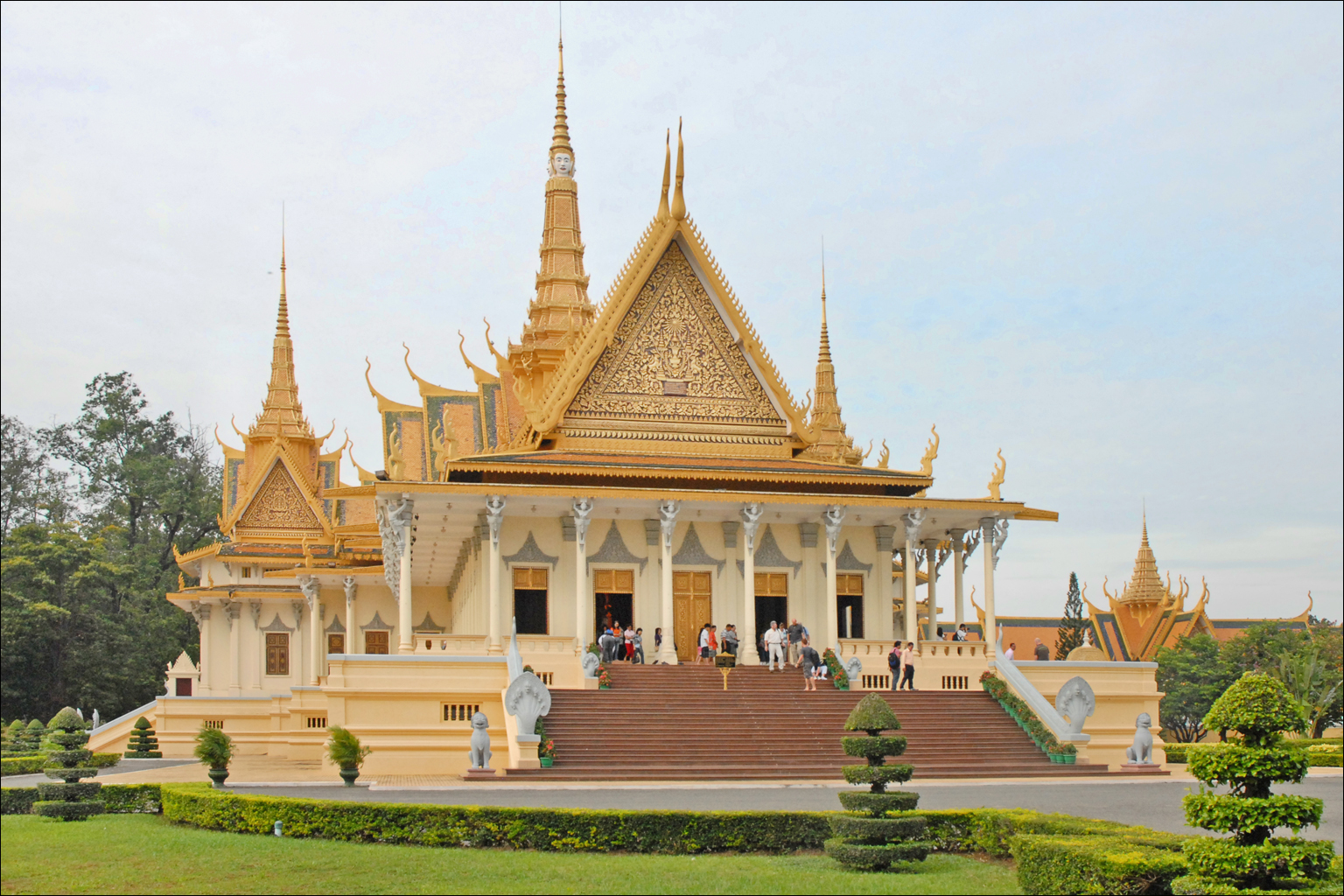
- The throne hall inside the Royal Palace complex

General information
- Architectural style: Khmer Architecture
- Location: Samdech Sothearos Blvd (3), Phnom Penh, Cambodia
- Coordinates: 11°33′49″N 104°55′51″E
- Construction started: 1866

Design and construction
- Architect: Neak Oknha Tep Nimith Mak

The Royal Palace of Cambodia (Khmer: ព្រះបរមរាជវាំង) (Note: UNGEGN: Preăh Bârômôréachôveăng ALA-LC: Braḥ Paramarājavāṃng Khmer pronunciation: [preah ɓɑːromaʔriəceaʔʋeaŋ]) is a complex of buildings which serves as the official royal residence of the King of Cambodia. Its full name in Khmer is the Preah Barom Reacheaveang Chaktomuk Serey Mongkol (Khmer: ព្រះបរមរាជវាំងចតុមុខសិរីមង្គល). (Note: UNGEGN: Preăh Bârômôréachôveăng Châtŏmŭkh Sĕrimôngkôl ALA-LC: Braḥ Paramarājavāṃng Catumukh Sirīmanggal Khmer pronunciation: [preah ɓɑːromaʔriəceaʔʋeaŋ serəjmɔŋkɔl]) The Cambodian monarchs have occupied it since it was built in the 1860s, with a period of absence when the country came into turmoil during and after the rule of the Khmer Rouge.

The palace was constructed by King Norodom between 1866 and 1870; this original palace was largely demolished and rebuilt between 1912 and 1932, It is situated at the Western bank of the confluence of the Tonle Sap River and the Mekong River called Chaktomuk (an allusion to Brahma).

== History ==
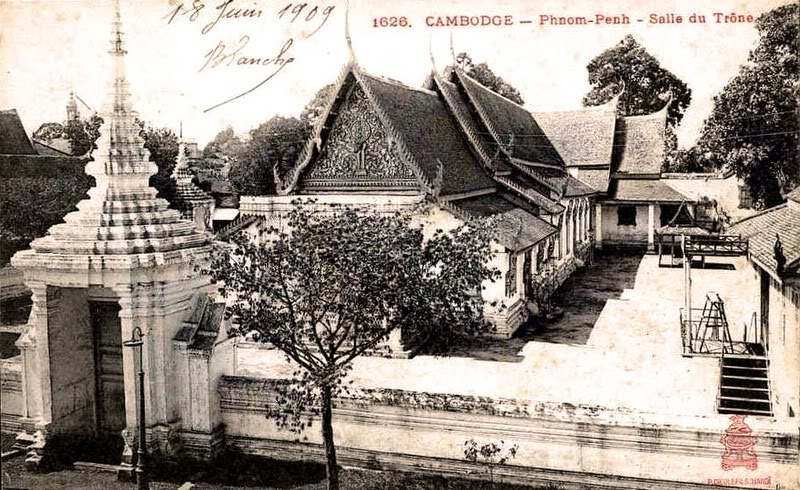
The original Throne Hall of the palace, postcard dated 1909-1910, This building was demolished in 1915. The current Throne Hall, occupying the same site but considerably larger, was inaugurated in 1919.

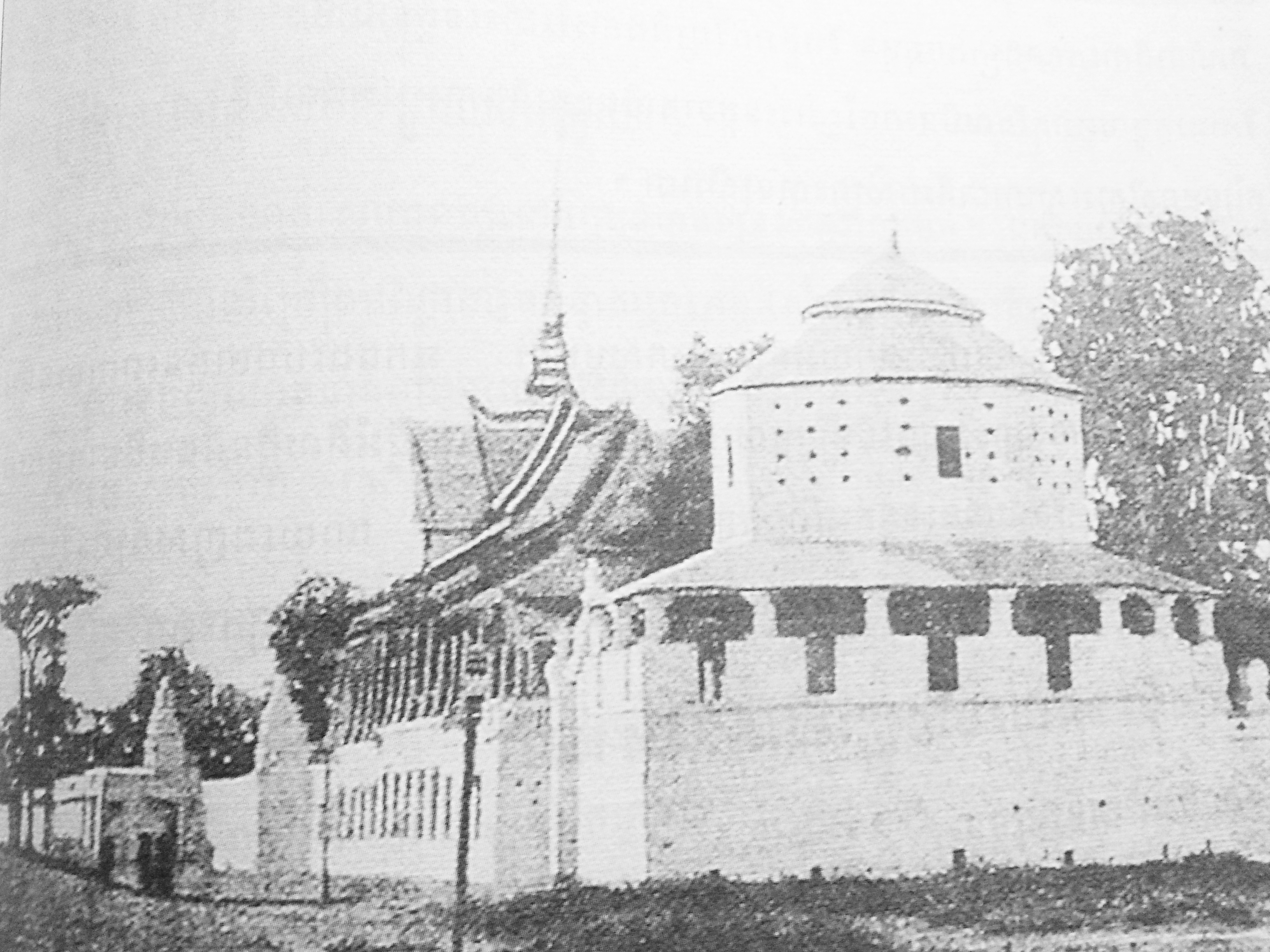
The Chan Chhaya Pavilion in 1885 and a now-removed bastion.

The establishment of the Royal Palace in Phnom Penh in 1866 is a comparatively recent event in the history of the Khmer and Cambodia. The seat of Khmer power in the region rested in or near Angkor north of the Great Tonle Sap Lake from 802 AD until the early 15th century. After the Khmer court moved from Angkor in the 15th century due to environmental problems and ecological imbalance, it first settled in Phnom Penh which back then named as Krong Chaktomuk Serei Mongkol (Khmer: ក្រុងចតុមុខសិរីមង្គល) in 1434 (or 1446) and stayed for some decades, but by 1494 had moved on to Basan, and later Longvek and then Oudong. The capital did not return to Phnom Penh until the 19th century and there is no record or remnants of any Royal Palace in Phnom Penh prior to the 19th century. In 1813, King Ang Chan (1796–1834) constructed Banteay Kev (the 'Crystal Citadel') on the site where the current Royal Palace stands . After Ang Chan, the capital was at Oudong, about 40 kilometers to the northwest, until in 1866 his nephew, King Norodom, returned to Phnom Penh.

Norodom lived first in a temporary wooden Palace a bit north of Wat Ounalom, while the permanent palace was being constructed. Norodom's palace was a compound containing many separate buildings, of which the most significant were the throne hall, the king's private villas (there were two of these, one on the north side of the throne hall and one on the south), the set of traditional salas, or open-sided pavilions, known as the Salle de Danse and Salle des Fetes (hall of dances and banquet hall), and the Napoleon Pavilion. These were all in the eastern, or public, courtyard. The western courtyard was for the king's women, which the French called his harem, and although this is not exactly accurate the only adult male allowed to enter was the king himself.

The whole complex was surrounded by a wall (originally a wall to the east and a moat to the west, but the moat was filled in some time after 1914) topped by decorative leaf shapes called seima; these same symbols are seen on the walls surrounding monasteries, and, as with monasteries, were used to symbolize that what lay within is holy. In addition, just outside the palace but part of it, were the Silver Pagoda to the south and the cremation ground to the north, while the park on the eastern side used for royal festivals such as the King's Birthday and the annual boat races.

King Norodom's palace was demolished and rebuilt by his successor, his half-brother King Sisowath, between 1912 and 1919, and today the only sizeable remains are the eastern section of the wall and the Napoleon Pavilion. The main elements of the public eastern courtyard of the modern palace are:

- The Throne Hall, which contains the three main royal thrones and is the place kings are crowned and where foreign ambassadors are received;
- The Napoleon Pavilion, which Norodom used as a reception hall and is today a museum;
- The Phochani Pavilion, a banqueting hall;
- The Chan Chhaya or Moonlight Pavilion on the northeast section of the wall, used for state banquets and dance performances;
- The Damnak Chan behind the Napoleon Pavilion, an administrative building.

The western courtyard is still private, and it is here that the king has his private residential villa, the Khemarin, as well as the Villa Kantha Bopha to accommodate of the Queen mother.

== Buildings of the Royal Palace ==
The complex is divided by walls into four main compounds. On the south side is the Silver Pagoda, to the north side is the Khemarin Palace and the central compound contains the Throne Hall and to the west is the private sector or the Inner Court. The buildings of the palace were built gradually over time, and some were dismantled and rebuilt as late as the 1960s. Some older buildings date back to the 19th century.

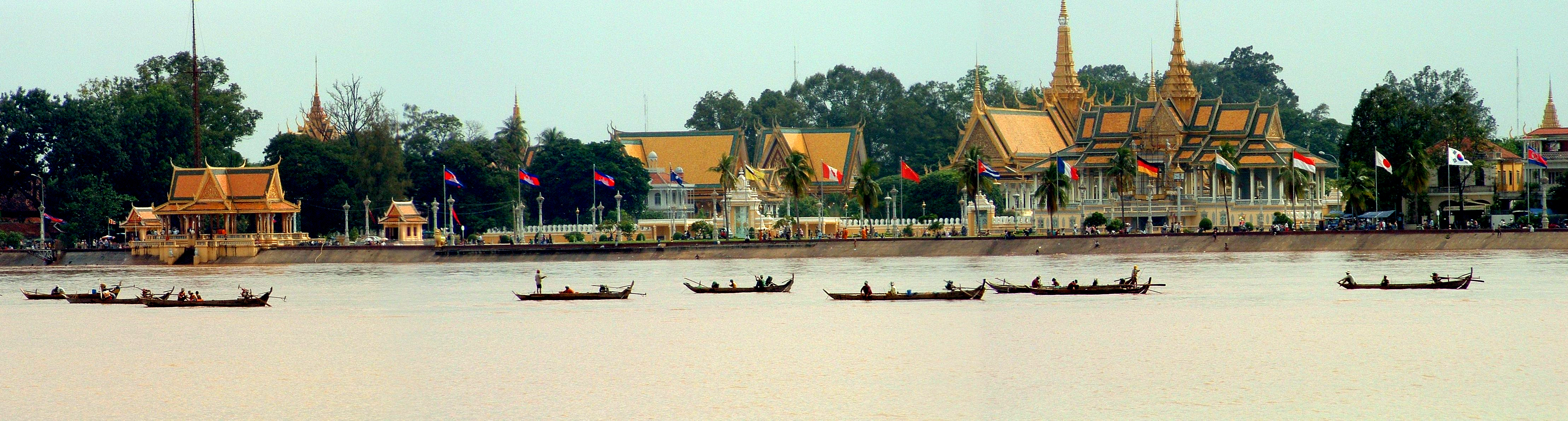
A front panoramic view of the Royal Palace from the Tonle Sap-Mekong River.

== Architecture and area ==
The Royal Palace of Cambodia is a good example of khmer architecture featuring its layout of the defensive wall (kampeng), throne hall (preah thineang), Temple of the Emerald Buddha (Wat Preah Keo Morakot), stupas (chedei), towering spires (prang prasat) and mural paintings. The Royal Palace of Phnom Penh covers an area of 174,870 square metres (1,882,300 sq ft) (402m x 435m)

=== Throne Hall ===
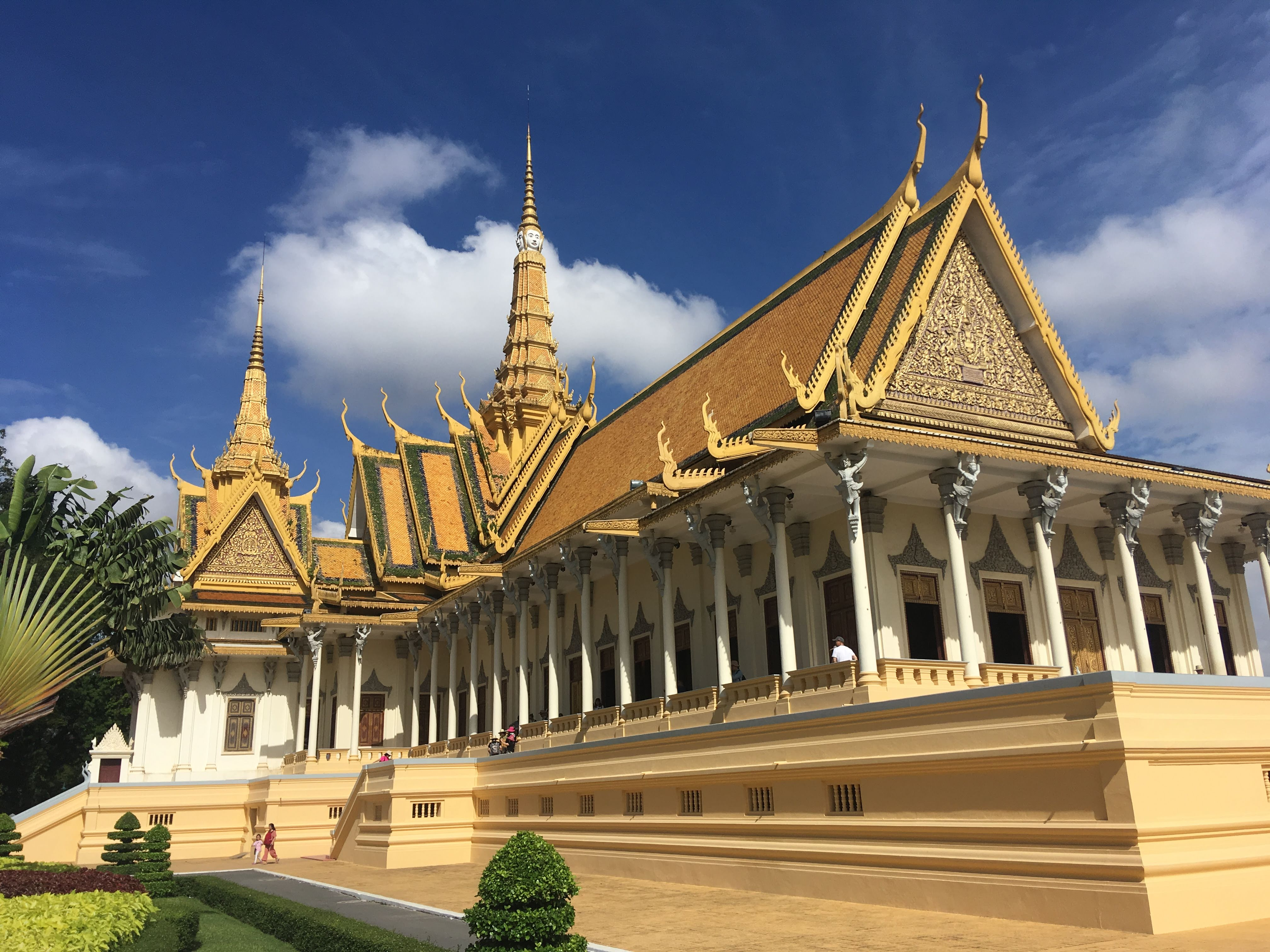

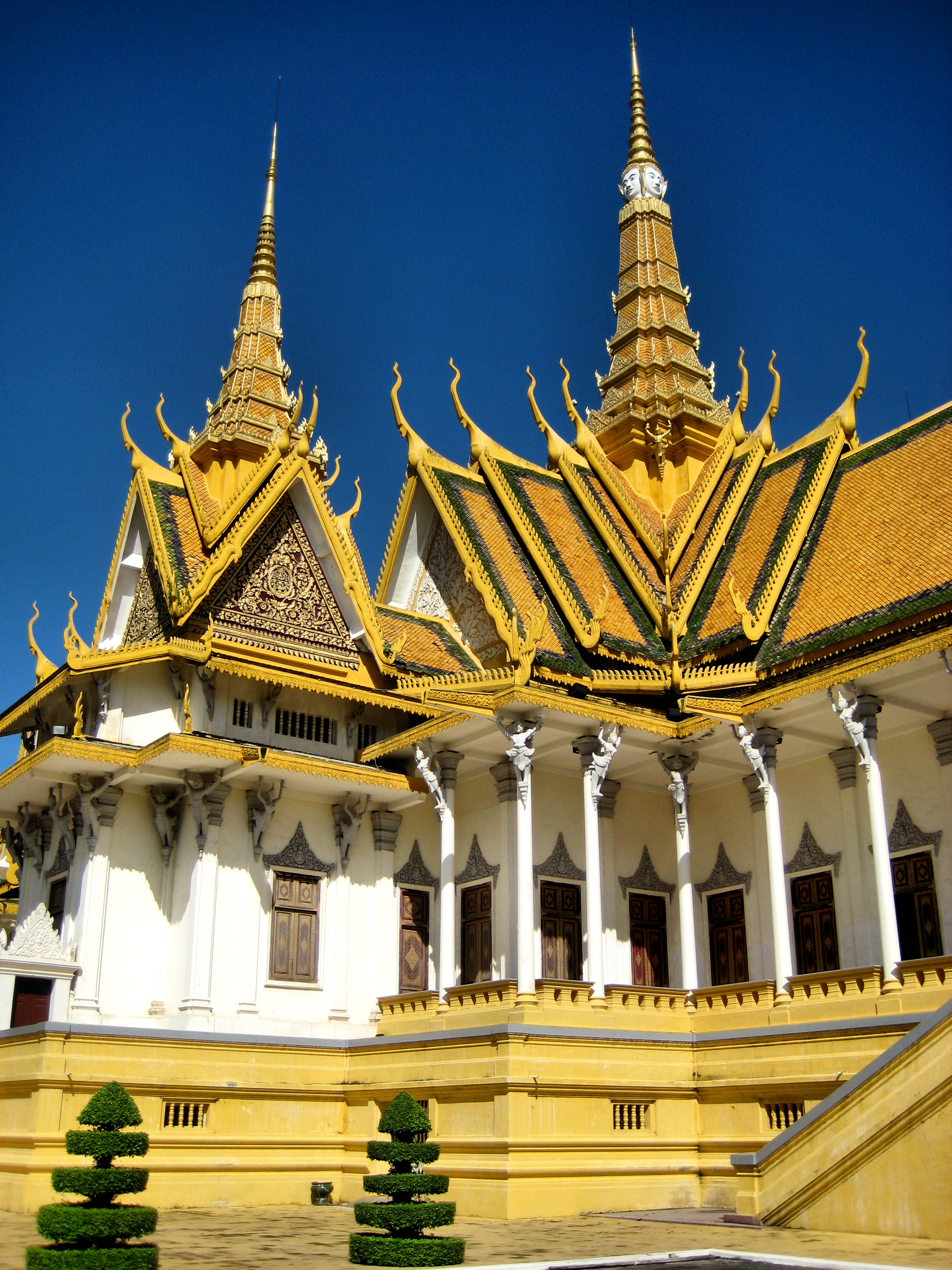
The Throne Hall

The Preah Tineang.Tevea Vinnichay Mohai Moha Prasat or "Throne Hall" (Khmer: ព្រះទីនាំងទេវាវិនិច្ឆ័យមហ័យមហាប្រាសាទ) means the "Sacred Seat of Judgement." The Throne Hall is where the king's confidants, generals and royal officials once carried out their duties. It is still in use today as a place for religious and royal ceremonies (such as coronations and royal weddings) as well as a meeting place for guests of the King. The cross-shaped building is crowned with three spires. The central, 59-metre spire is topped with the white, four-faced head of Brahma. Inside the Throne Hall contains three royal thrones (one is more of western style and the other two are traditional) and golden busts of Cambodians kings and queens starting from the reign of King Ang Doung onwards. This Throne Hall is the second to be built on this site. The first was constructed in 1869–1870 under King Norodom. That Throne Hall was demolished in 1915. The present building was constructed in 1917 and inaugurated by King Sisowath in 1919. The building is 30x60 metres. As with all buildings and structure at the Palace, the Throne Hall faces east and is best photographed in the morning. When visiting note the thrones (Reach Balaing in front and Preah Thineang Bossabok higher at the back) and the beautiful ceiling frescoes of the Reamker. To the north of the thrones stands the statue of His Majesty King Sisowath Monivong standing holding the Royal Sword. The statue is made with gold and shows him dressed in casual clothes. While to the south of the thrones stands the gold statue of His Majesty King Sisowath sitting on the Preah Tineang Bossbok dressed and covered with the Royal Regalia of Cambodia (as you can see he is wearing the Crown, the Sopourna Bat or the royal footwear and in his right hand holds the Royal Sword. He sits on the Preah Thineang Bossabok which is made to look like the real one to the right.

The traditional throne or The Preah Tineang Bossbok (Khmer: ព្រះទីនាំងបុស្បុក) is an ancient nine-level throne. Each Khmer King has to be seated on it on the coronation day while wearing the Royal Regalia. It is covered with intricate floral carvings and has two levels of small statues of Garudas lifting the upper part of the bossabok. Three of the nine levels of the throne represent the levels of hell, middle earth and the heavens. Surrounding the bossabok are the four gold nine-tiered umbrellas, these are called the Aphirom (Khmer: អភិរម្យ). Finally, the bossabok is topped by the white Royal Nine-tiered umbrella (Khmer: ព្រះមហាស្វេតឆ័ត្រ) that signifies the universal power the king has. In front of the bossabok is the throne. The table that stands next to the Royal Throne holds on it a golden tea set and the golden set of betel and areca nuts container set, which are part of the regalia and are always on the table, or otherwise called the Pean Preah Srei (Khmer: ពានព្រះស្រី). Behind the preah thineang bossabok is another bossabok called the Preah Tineang Nearyrath Sophea (Khmer: ព្រះទីនាំងនារីរ័ត្នសោភា), the Preah Thineang Bossabok is for the king and the Preah Thineang Nearyrath Sophea at the back is for the queen. Like every king has to sit on the front bossabok, every queen also needs to sit on the taller bossabok behind. After sitting on the bossaboks while wearing the regalia, the kings and queens will be escorted to their palanquins to be paraded around the city.

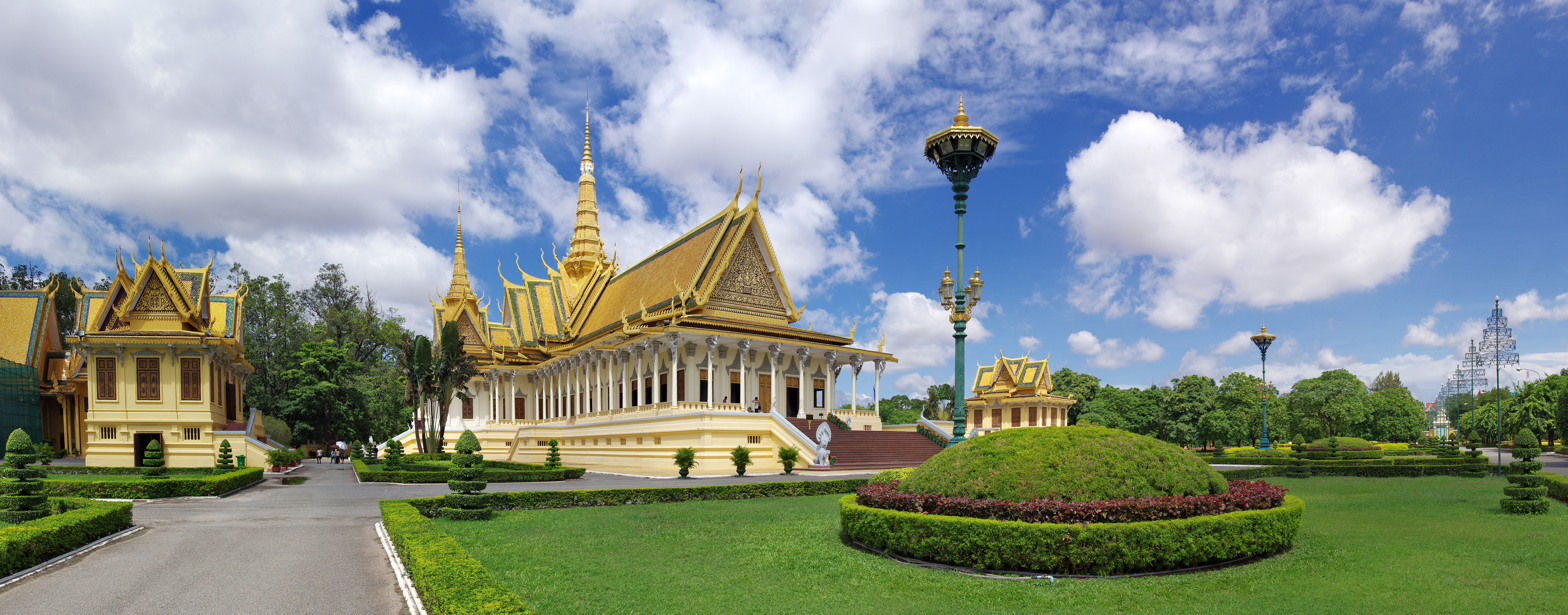

=== Moonlight Pavilion ===
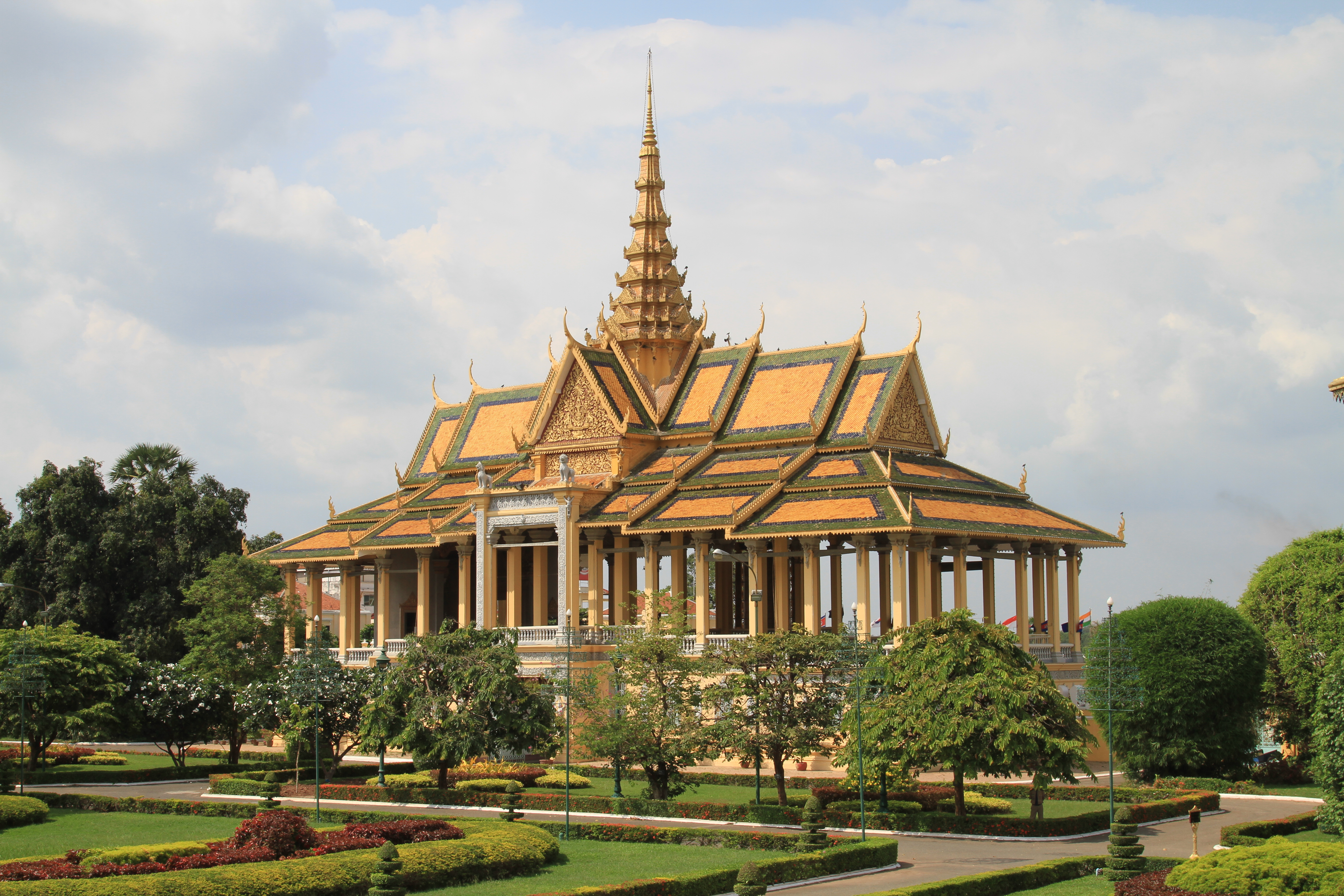
Moonlight Pavilion

The Preah Tineang Chan Chhaya (Khmer: ព្រះទីនាំងច័ន្ទឆាយា) or "Moonlight Pavilion", is an open-air pavilion that serves as stage for Khmer classical dance in the past and present. It is one of the most notable buildings of the palace as it easily seen from the outside as it was built alongside a section of the palace walls. The Chan Chhaya Pavilion has a balcony that was used as a platform for viewing parades marching along Sothearos Boulevard of Phnom Penh. The current Pavilion is the second incarnation of the Chanchhaya Pavilion, this one constructed in 1913–14 under King Sisowath to replace the earlier pavilion built under King Norodom. The current pavilion is of a similar design as the earlier version. The Chanchhaya Pavilion dominates the facade of the Palace on Sothearos Blvd. The Pavilion serves as a venue for the Royal Dancers, as a tribune for the King to address the crowds and as a place to hold state and Royal banquets. Most recently, the Pavilion was used for a banquet and a tribune for the new King at the 2004 coronation of King Norodom Sihamoni.

=== Napoleon Pavilion ===
The Napoleon Pavilion is a prefabricated cast iron villa manufactured for King Norodom by the Paris firm of Docros in 1875. During the 19th century and the first decade of the 20th it was known as the maison de fer, or Iron House; the story identifying it as a gift of the Emperor Napoleon III first appears in 1925 in a history by the former colonial administrator Paul Collard, who based his story that it was built for Napoleon's wife, the Empress Eugenie, to attend the opening ceremony of the Suez Canal in November 1869. King Norodom's name for it was the Tusitala, the Buddhist heaven in which the fifth and final Buddha waits for his incarnation.

=== Phochani Pavilion ===
The Phochani ("banquet") pavilion was built in 1912 as a replacement for an older banquet and dance complex located slightly to the north, between the modern Phochani and the Throne Hall. It was a built-in reinforced concrete, This pavilion which is used to organize a banquet for His Majesty the king during the King’s birthday celebration, which includes a display of royal dance performances, for distinguished guests, as well as high-ranking national and international guests.

=== Silver Pagoda ===
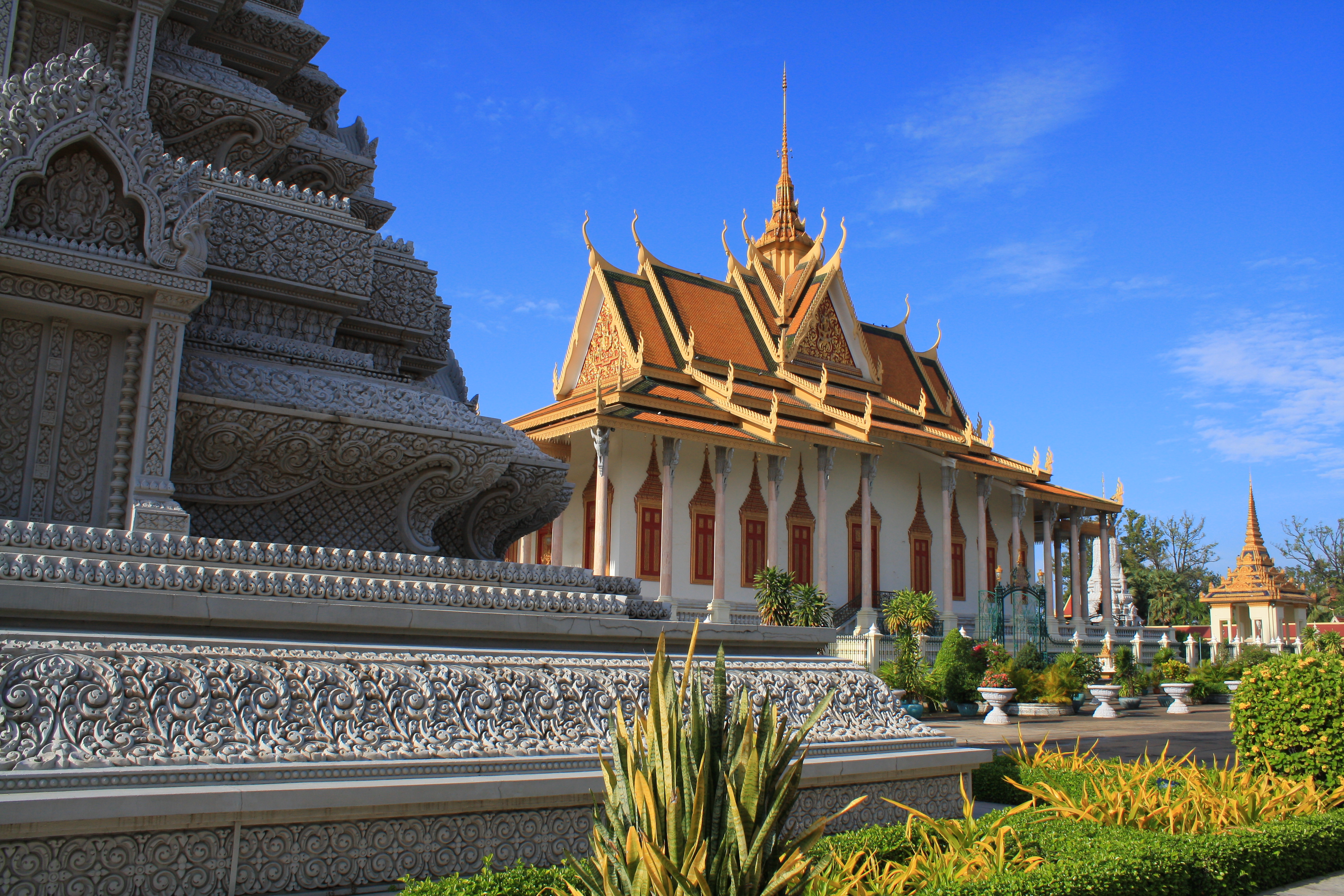
Silver Pagoda

The Silver Pagoda is a compound located on the South side of the palace complex. It features a royal temple officially called Preah Vihear Preah Keo Morakot (Khmer: ព្រះវិហារព្រះកែវមរកត) but is commonly referred to as Wat Preah Keo (Khmer: វត្តព្រះកែវ). Its main building houses many national treasures such as gold and jeweled Buddha statues. Most notable is a small crystal Buddha (the "Emerald Buddha" of Cambodia) – undetermined whether made of Baccarat Crystal in 19th century or of other kind of crystal in 17th century – and a near-life-size, Maitreya Buddha encrusted with 9,584 diamonds dressed in royal regalia commissioned by King Sisowath. During King Sihanouk's pre-Khmer Rouge reign, the Silver Pagoda was inlaid with more than 5,000 silver tiles and some of its outer facade was remodelled with Italian marble.

There are also other structures surrounding the main building or the vihear. To the east is the statue of King Norodom sits on a white horse. To the north of the vihear is the library. At the northwestern corner is the bell tower and south of that is the model of Angkor Wat. South of the vihear stand four structures: from west to east the Chedi (stupa) of H.M. King Norodom Suramarit and Queen Sisowath Kossamak, the Dharmasala, the Chedi of Princess Kantha Bupha and The Phnom Mondop (mount mondop) where the statue of Preah Ko is situated. The wall that surrounds the structures is covered with the painting of the epic story of Reamker but because neglected care, the bottom half of the painting faded throughout the years.

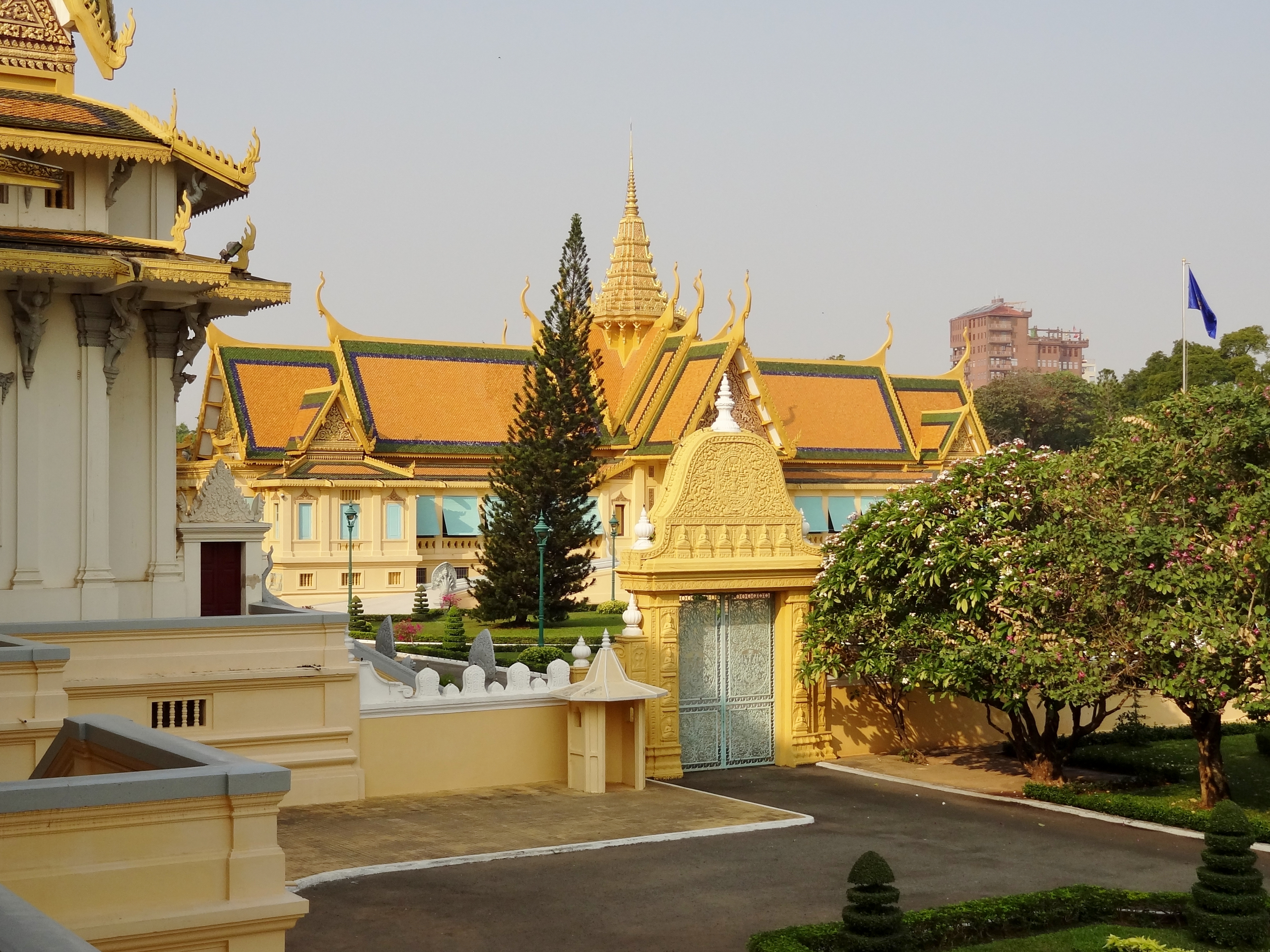
Khemarin Palace, the official residence of the King of Cambodia

=== Khemarin Palace ===
The Khemarin Palace is the common English name for a building called in Khmer Khemarin Moha Prasat (Khmer: ខេមរិន្ត្រមហាប្រាសាទ; meaning "the Palace of the Khmer King"). It is used as an official residence of the King of Cambodia. This compound is separated from other buildings by a small wall and is located to the right of the Throne Hall. The main building is topped with a single spired prang.

=== Other structures ===
Other structures include, Hor Samran Phirun, Hor Samrith Phimean, Damnak Chan, Phochani Pavilion (dance hall), Serey Monkol Pavilion (royal conference hall), King Jayavarman VII Pavilion, Vihear Suor, a royal chapel built as a votive chapel of Wat Vihear Suor, Villa Kantha Bopha, Villa Chumpou, Villa Sahametrei, royal gardens, and some less significant buildings in an area closed to the public.

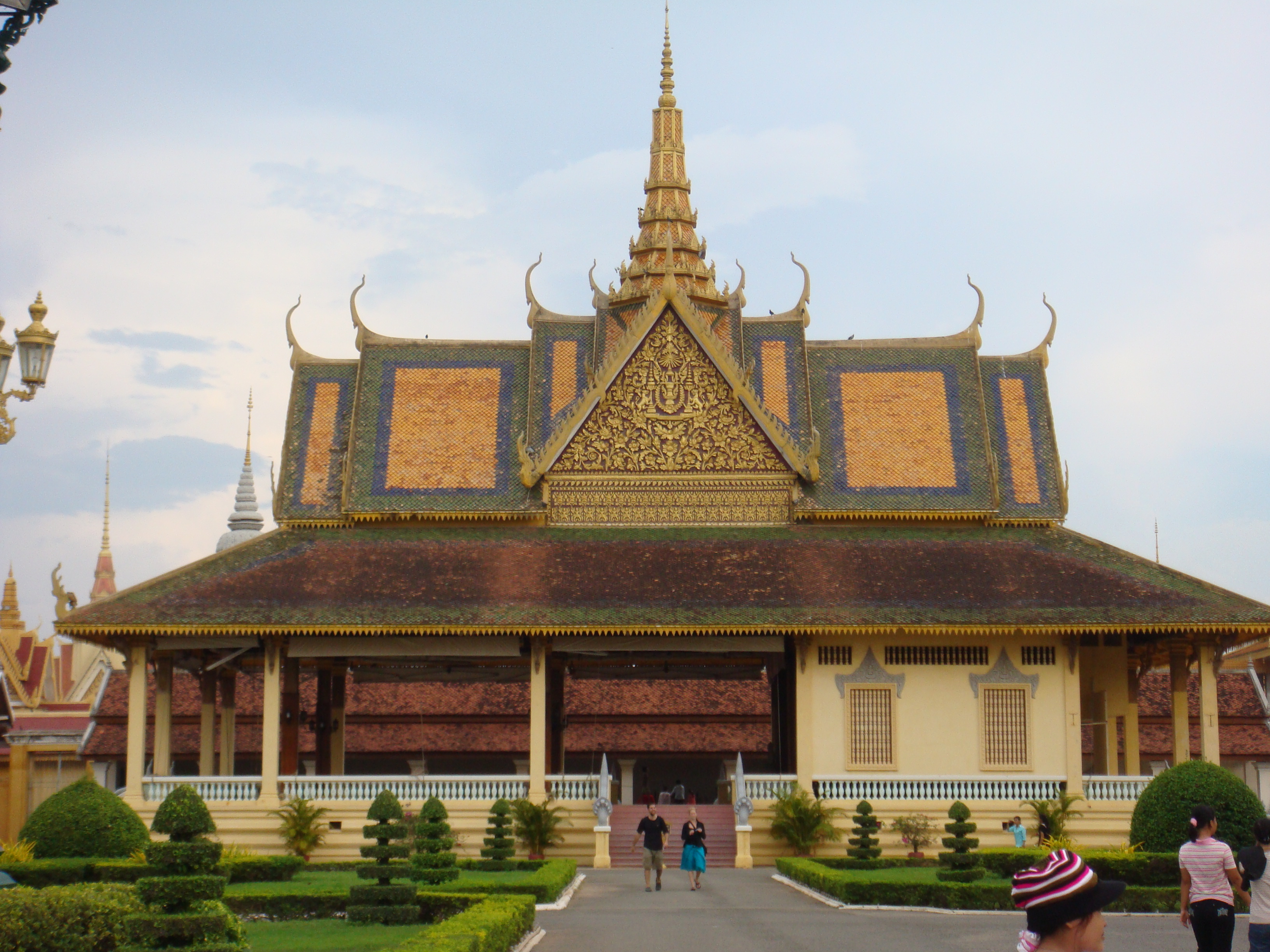
Phochani Pavilion

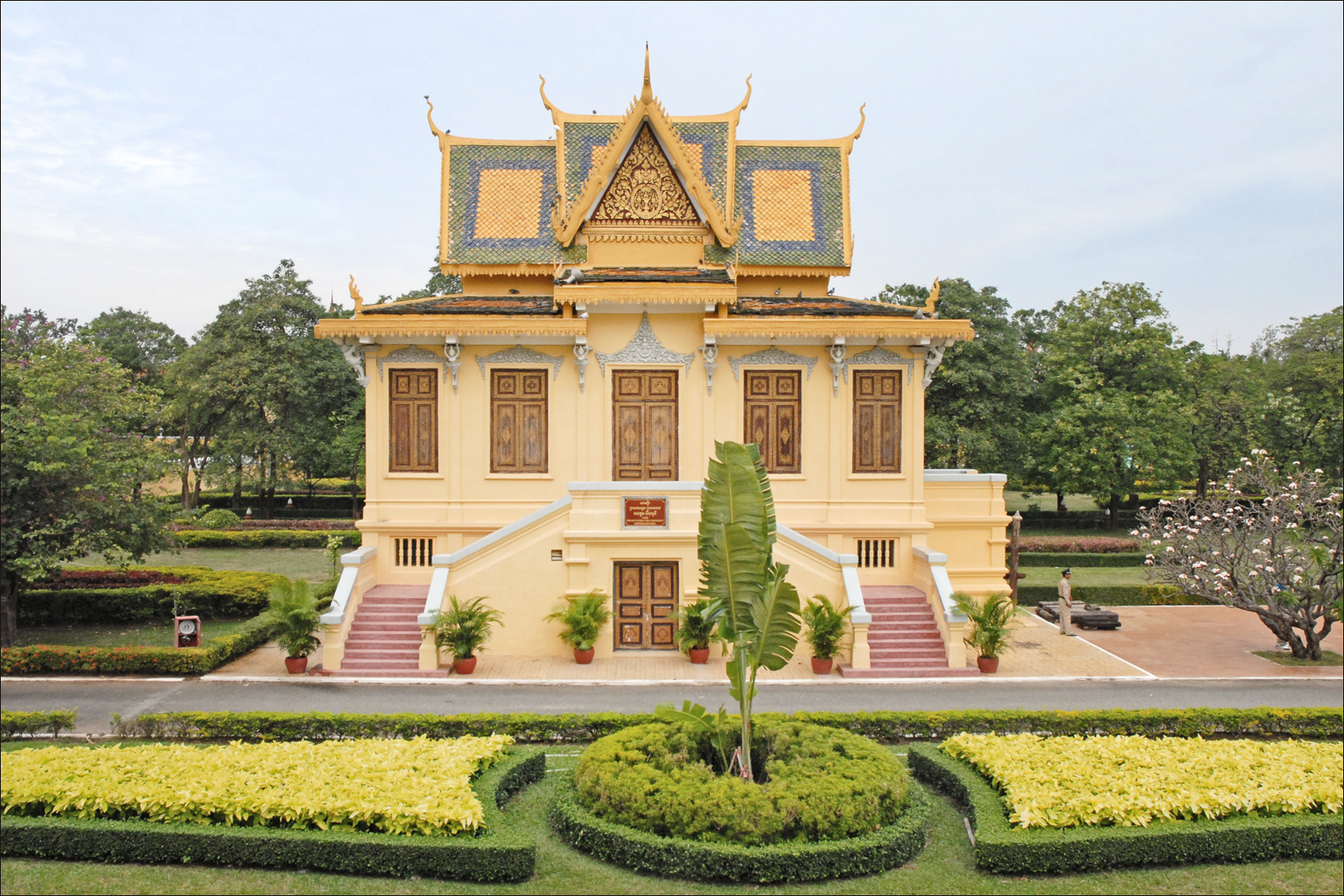
Hor Samran Phirun

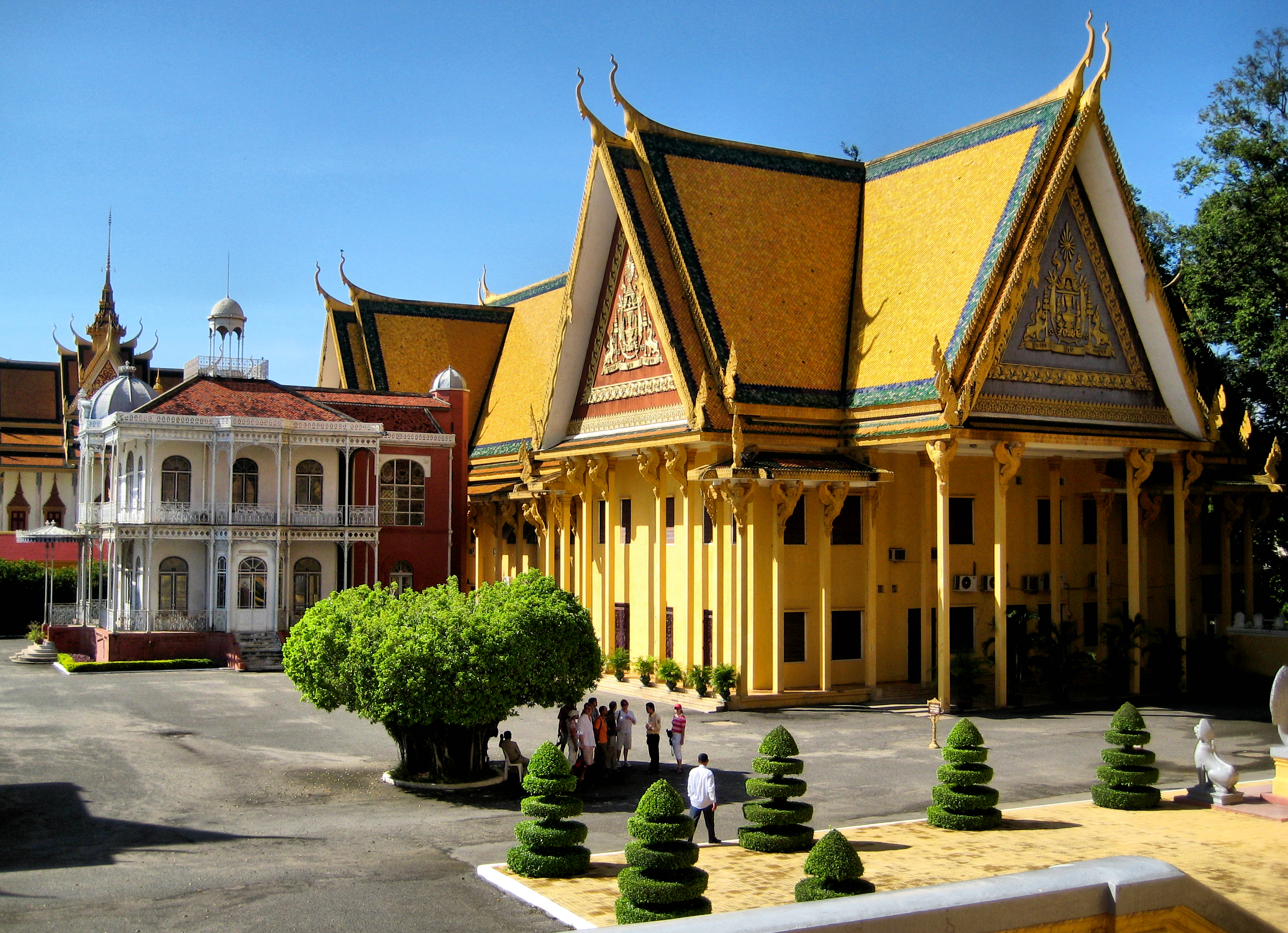
Offices inside the complex

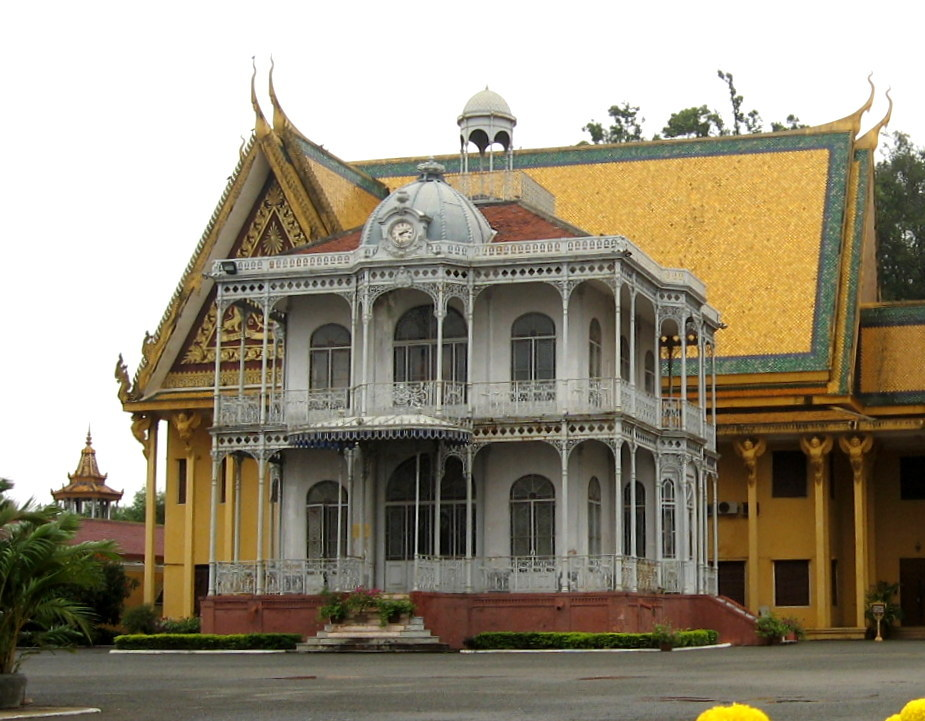
Napoleon III Pavilion

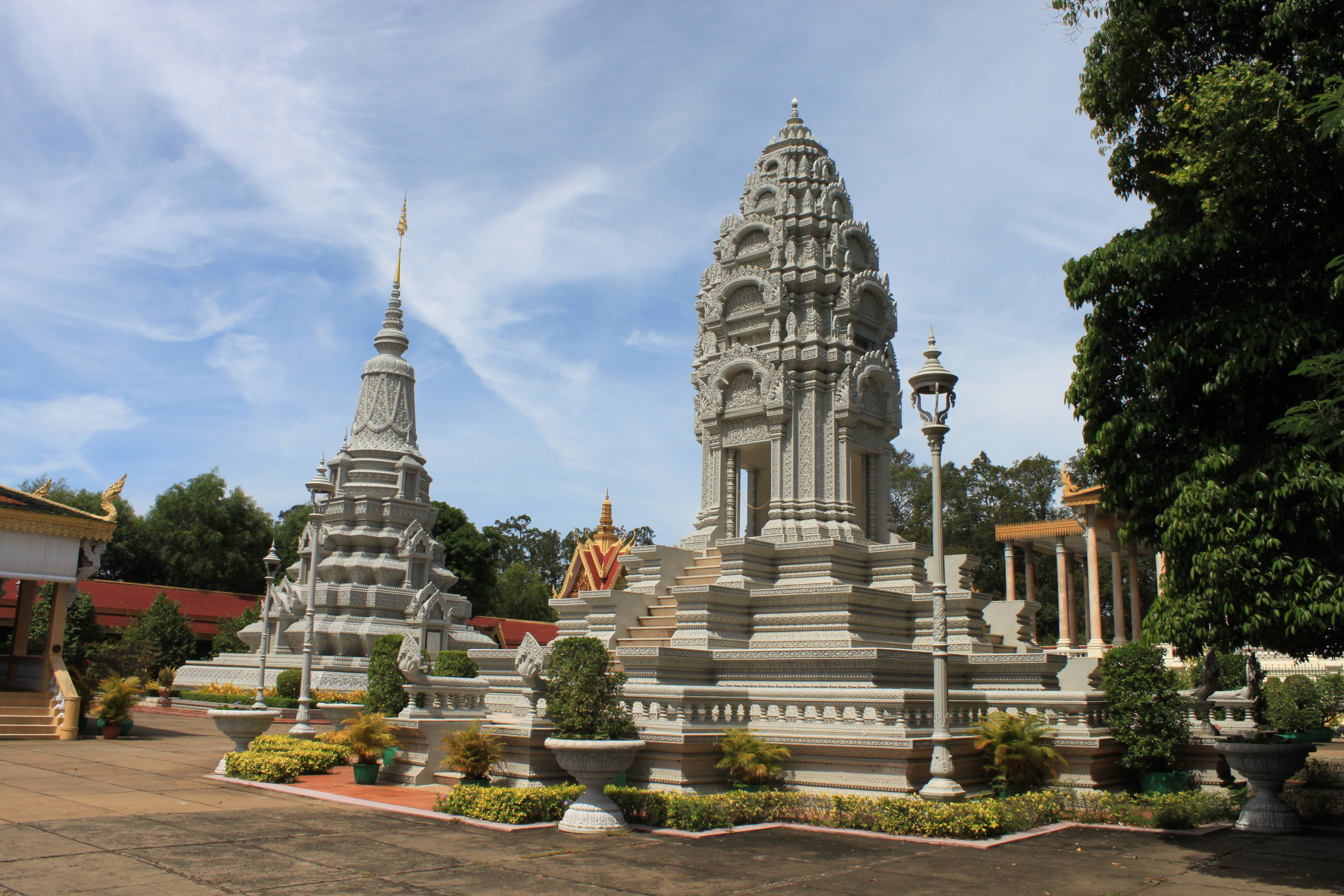
Royal stupas

=== Gardens ===
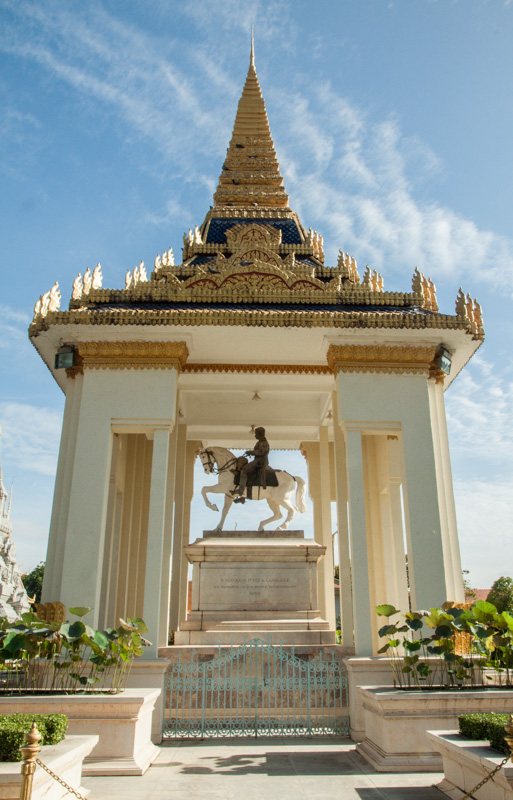
Statue of King Norodom

The palace has various gardens with tropical flowers and plants, such as Allamanda cathartica, Couroupita guianensis and Jatropha integerrima.

== The Royal Palace today ==
The Royal Palace has had some major modifications to its buildings over time; nearly all of the King Norodom era buildings have been demolished completely. The King's living area (closed to public) has also undergone big changes. In the 1960s at Queen Kossamak's command the Silver Pagoda was rebuilt due to the original aging structure being too weak to stand.

The palace has always been a popular tourist attraction in Phnom Penh. Visitors are able to wander around the Silver Pagoda compound and the central compound containing the Throne Hall and Chan Chhaya Pavilion. The King's living area, which actually takes up half of the total palace ground area, including Khemarin Palace, Villa Kantha Bopha, Serey Mongkol Pavilion, royal gardens, and a number of other buildings and pavilions, is closed to the public.

== Gallery ==
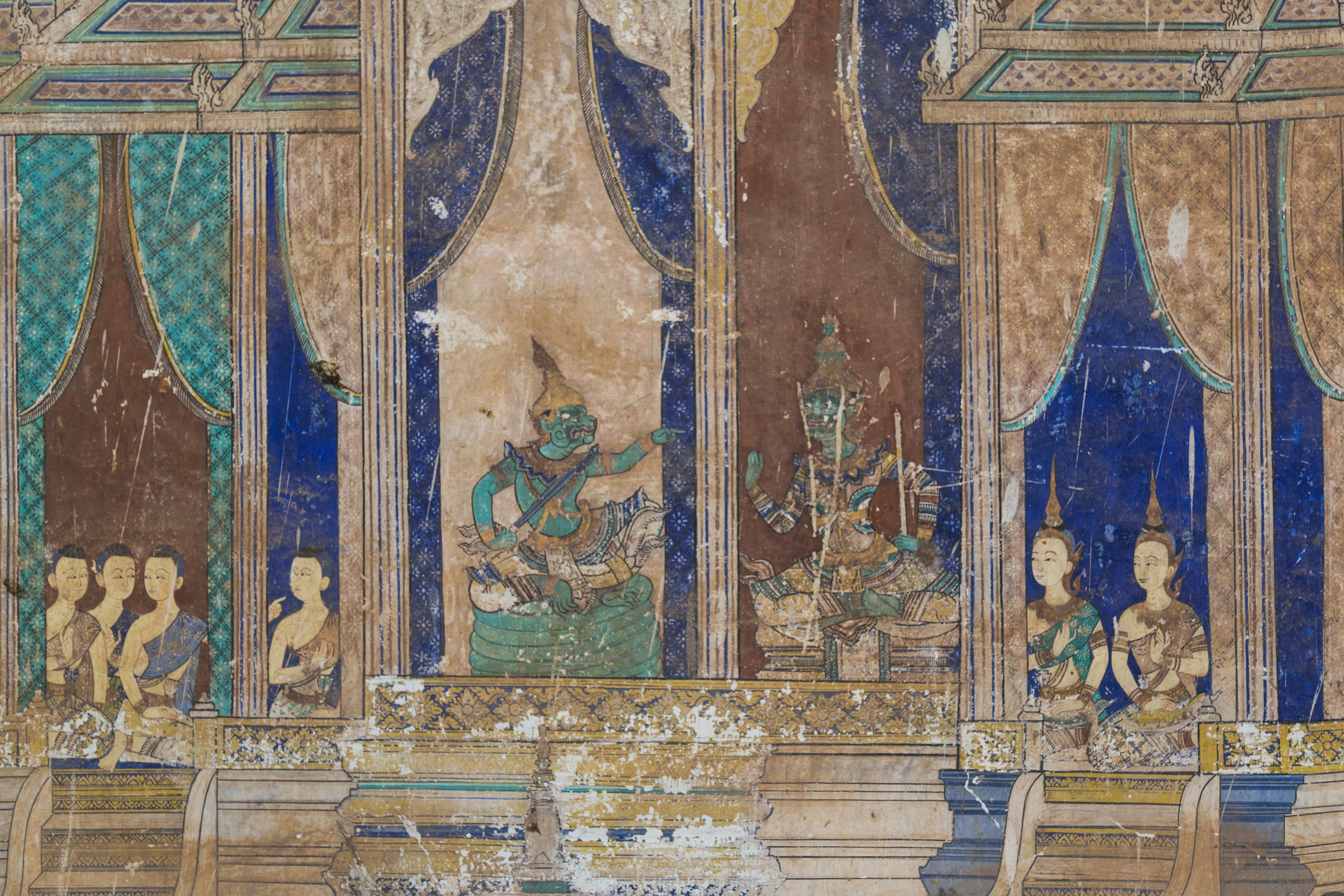
Mural depicting stories of the Reamker

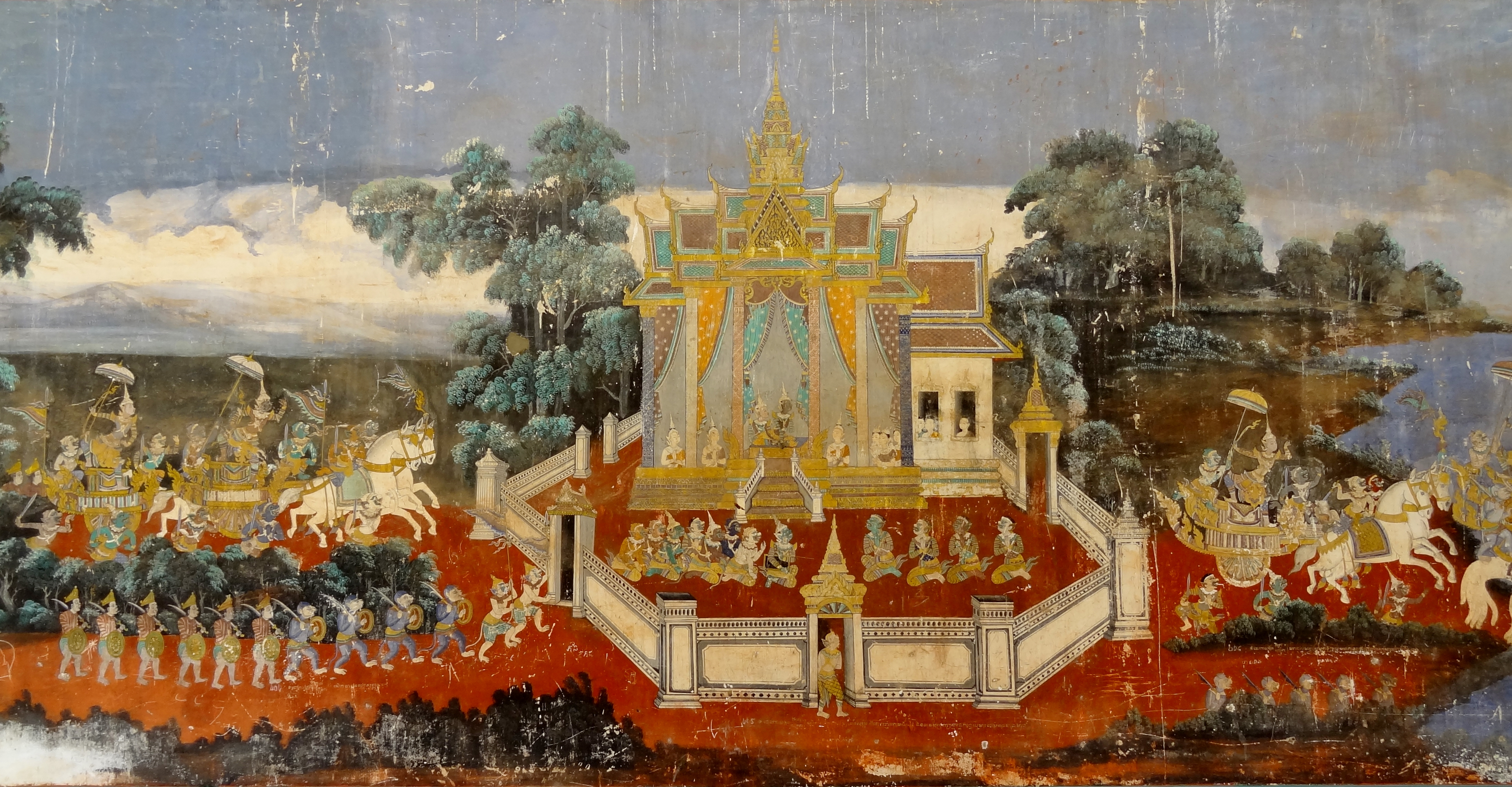
Portion of a 1903–1904 mural in Phnom Penh's Silver Pagoda

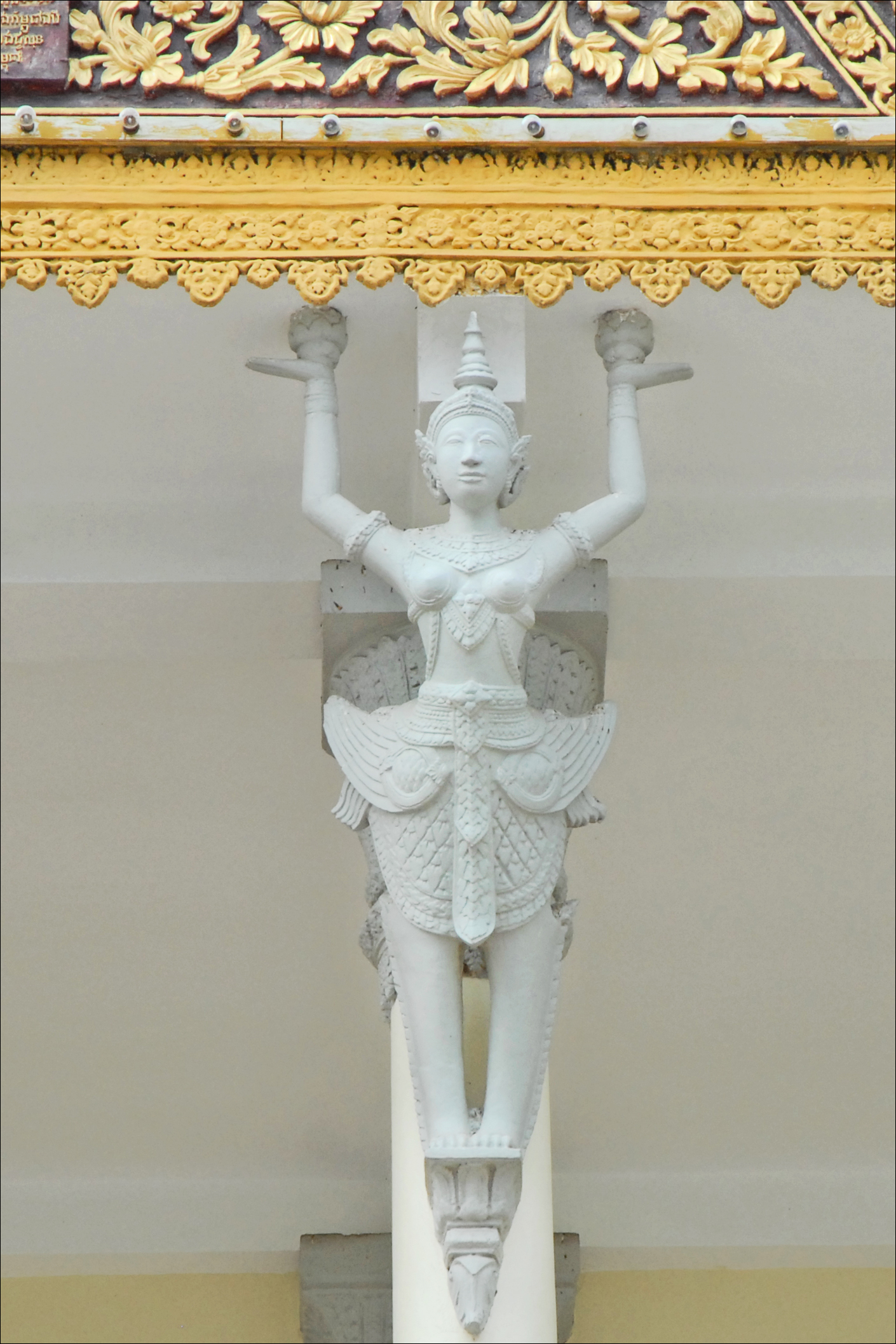
A decorative column figurine (Kinnara)

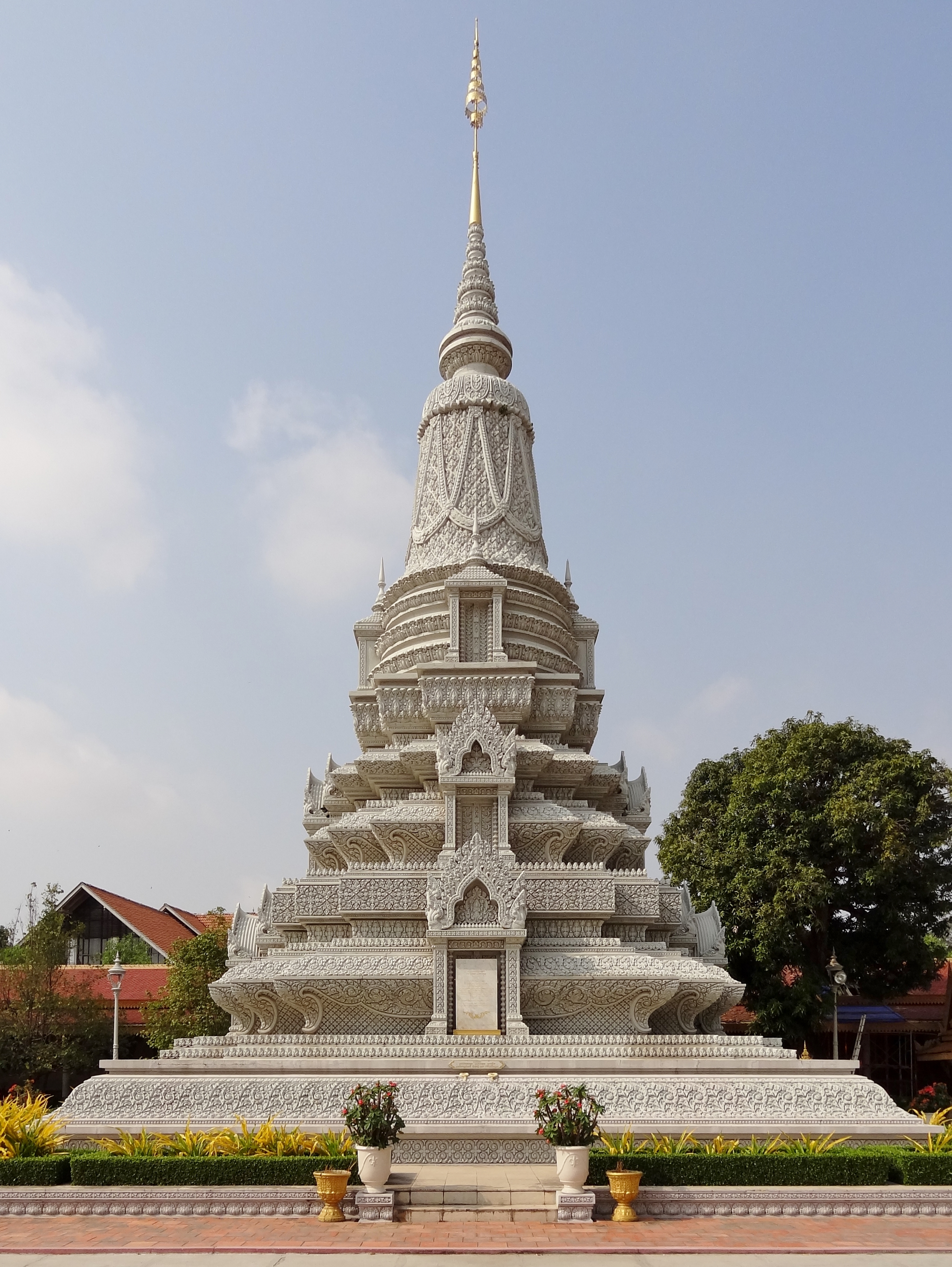
Stupa of King Norodom Suramarit

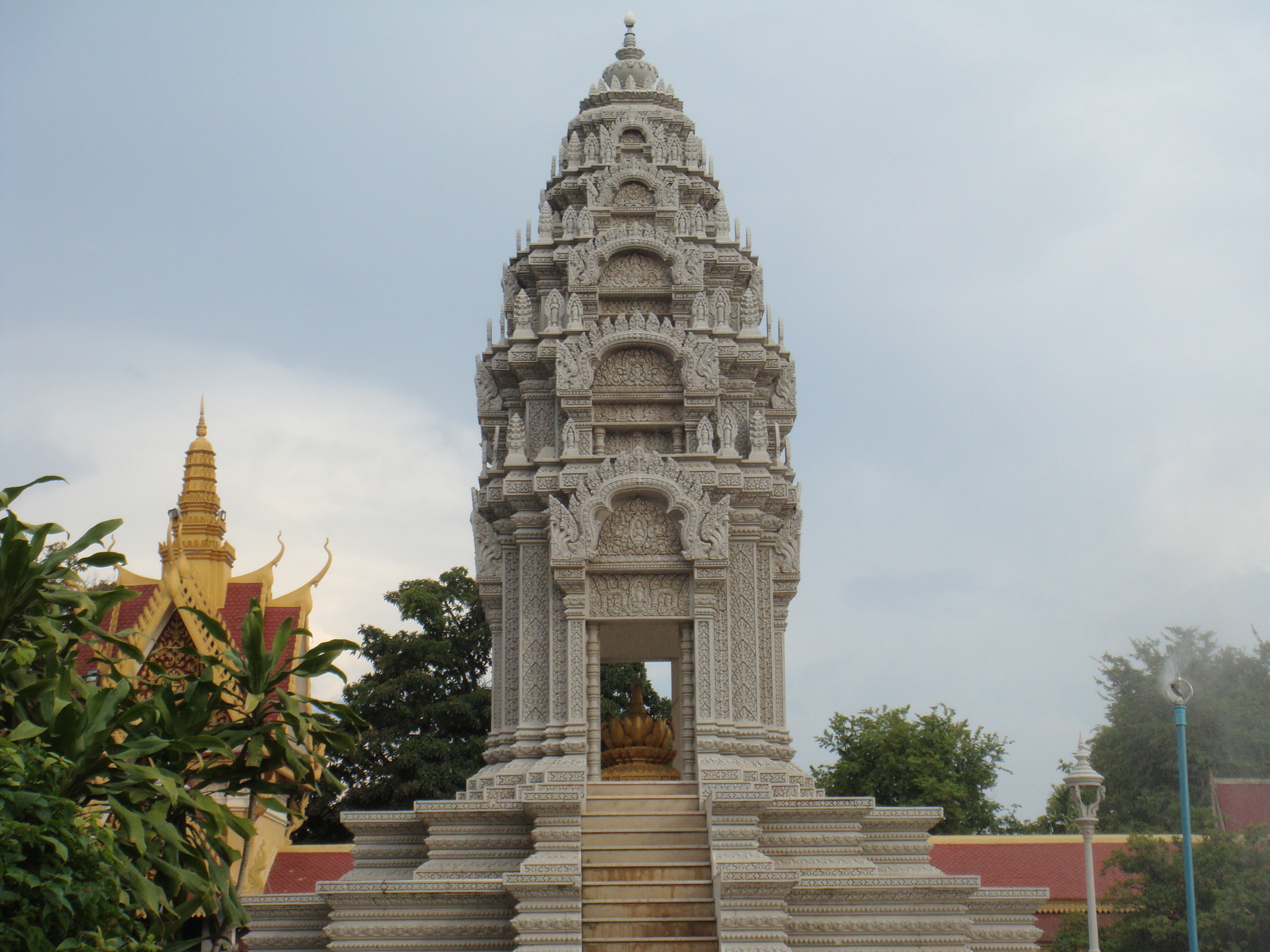
Stupa of Kantha Bopha

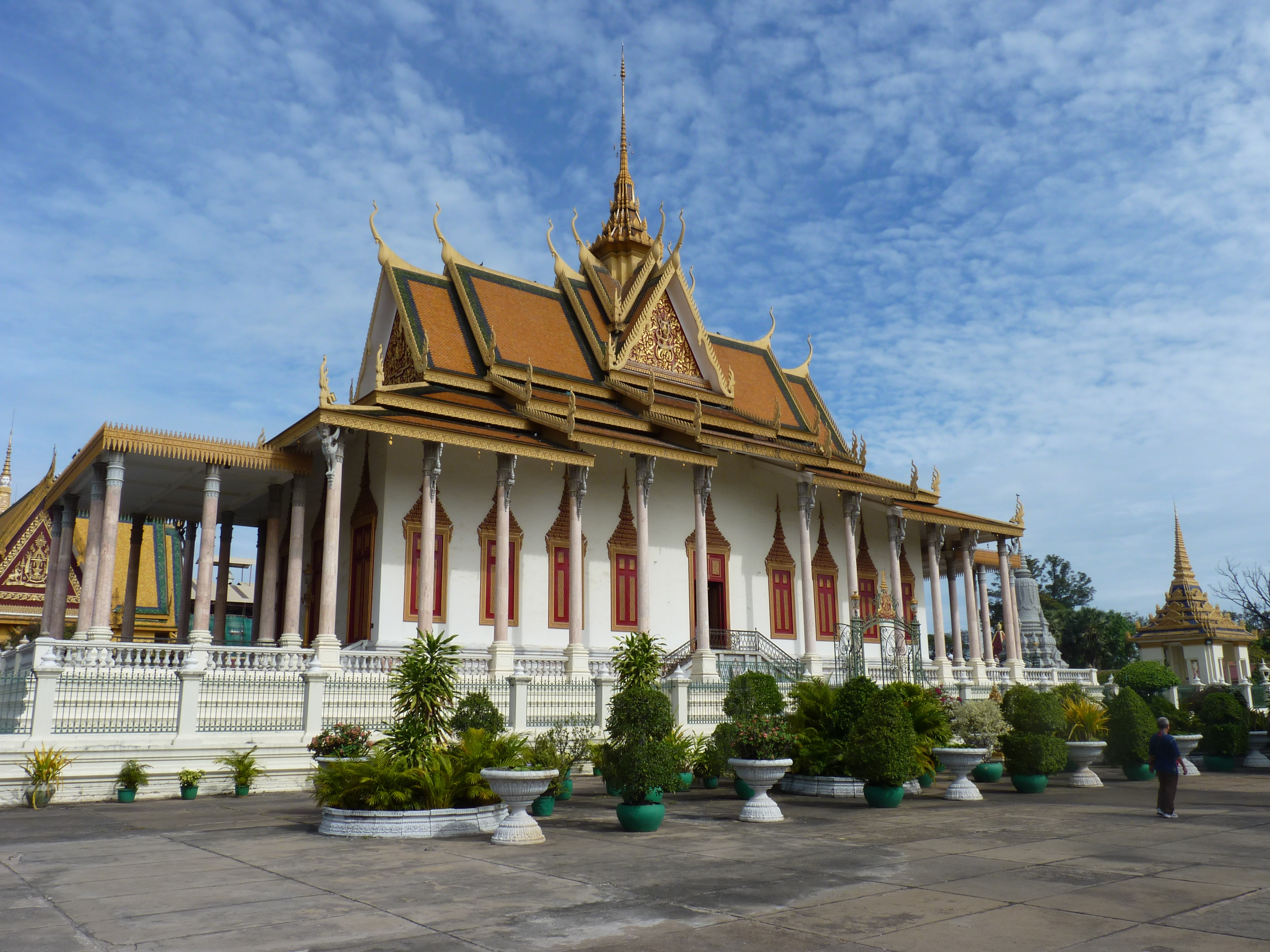
The Silver Pagoda in 2013
