= Bemis =

Bemis may refer to:

== People and fictional characters ==
- Andru Bemis (born 1978), American musician
- Edward Herbert Bemis (died 1901), founder of the Bemis Eye Sanitarium Complex
- Edward Webster Bemis (1860–1930), American economist and a public utility expert
- Florence E. Bemis (1861?–?), American entomologist
- George Bemis (lawyer) (1816–1878), American lawyer and legal scholar
- George P. Bemis (1838–1916), American developer, politician and women's rights supporter
- Harold Medberry Bemis (1884–1970), United States Navy rear admiral
- Harry Bemis (1874–1947), American baseball player
- Horace E. Bemis (1868–1914), American college football player and lumber dealer
- Leo Bemis (1918–2007), American college soccer coach
- Max Bemis (born 1984), American rock singer of the band Say Anything
- Polly Bemis (1853–1933), Chinese–American pioneer
- Samuel Bemis (1793–1881), early American photographer
- Samuel Flagg Bemis (1891–1973), American historian and biographer
- Shane Bemis (born 1972), American politician
- Henry Bemis, protagonist of "Time Enough at Last", a 1959 Twilight Zone episode
- Eric Bemis, a main character in "Santa Clarita Diet", a Netflix original series

== Places in the United States ==
- Bemis (Watertown, Massachusetts), a neighborhood of Watertown
- Bemis, South Dakota, an unincorporated community
- Bemis, Tennessee, a former company town, now part of the city of Jackson
- Bemis, West Virginia, an unincorporated community

== Companies ==
- Bemis Company, a packaging company
- Bemis Manufacturing Company, a manufacturer of toilet seats and other plastics products

== Other uses ==
- Bemis Center for Contemporary Arts, Omaha, Nebraska, United States, a museum

== See also ==
- Bemis Hall (Colorado Springs, Colorado), United States, part of Colorado College and on the National Register of Historic Places
- Bemis Hall (Lincoln, Massachusetts)
- Bemis House (disambiguation)
- Bemis Mill, Newton, Massachusetts, on the National Register of Historic Places
