= Thailand–United States relations =

Bilateral relations between the U.S. and Thailand

- Thailand: United States

Diplomatic mission
- Royal Thai Embassy, Washington, D.C.: Embassy of the United States, Bangkok

Envoy
- Ambassdor Suriya Chindawongse: Ambassdor Sean O'Neill

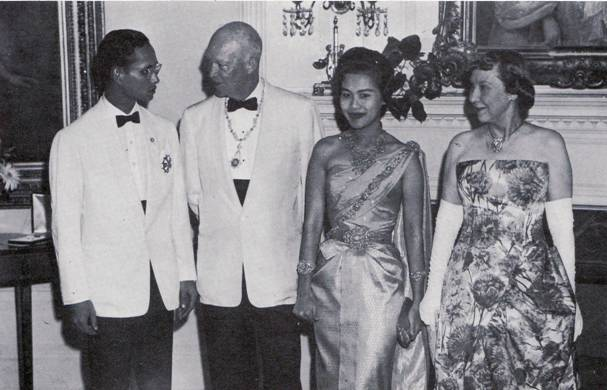
King Bhumibol Adulyadej, President Dwight D. Eisenhower, Queen Sirikit and First Lady Mamie Eisenhower at the White House on June 28, 1960

Bilateral relations between Thailand and the United States date back to 1818. The two nations have long been close allies and diplomatic partners, since before and during the Cold War with geopolitical shifts in Southeast Asia, focusing on the transition from French colonial and American anti-Communist pressures to the rise of communist regimes led by three Marxist–Leninist faction ideologies in 1975 through Indochina as part of Asian Domino theory near the Thai border and the alliance of Thailand with the United States.

The United States has been influential in helping Thailand end its extraterritorial treaties with the European powers in the 1920s and has also been very influential in helping the Thai economy in the mid 20th century, contributing to the Thailand economic miracle of the 1960s. To this day, Thailand has been consistently been one of the United States' most significant friends and allies in the Asia-Pacific region since the 19th century.

== Historical relations ==
=== 19th century ===
The first recorded contact between Thailand (then known as Siam) and the United States occurred in 1818, when an American ship captain visited the country bearing a letter from President James Monroe. Chang and Eng Bunker, the original Siamese twins, were brought to the United States in the early 1830s.

In 1832, President Andrew Jackson sent his envoy Edmund Roberts on the USS Peacock to the court of Siam. Roberts signed a Treaty of Amity and Commerce on March 20, 1833, with Chao Phraya Phraklang Prayurawongse representing King Nangklao (Rama III). Naval surgeon William Ruschenberger accompanied the return mission for exchange of ratifications. His account and that of Mr. Roberts were collected, edited, and re-published as Two Yankee Diplomats in 1830s Siam. Thailand is thus the first Asian nation to have made a formal diplomatic agreement with the United States, eleven years before the Great Qing and twenty-one years before Tokugawa Japan. This was affirmed in 2008 by Prime Minister Samak Sundaravej, who met President George W. Bush "on the auspicious occasion of the celebration of 175th anniversary" of Thai–American relations. In 1863, France took its first major step into the region by establishing a French protectorate of Cambodia, move directly challenged the Kingdom of Siam (modern-day Thailand), pressuring the Siamese crown to renounce its long-standing suzerainty over the Cambodian region. Following the Paknam naval incident, where French warships forced their way up the Chao Phraya River towards Bangkok, Siam was issued a harsh ultimatum. Under the resulting Franco-Siamese Treaty, Siam was forced to cede all territories east of the Mekong River that comprise the majority of modern day Laos to France, which also became a French protectorate, where these territories were quickly absorbed into the expanding union of French Indochina. Both Thailand and Japan invaded and annexed parts of Cambodia and Laos during World War II (specifically in 1941 through the Franco-Thai War). After the Second World War, Thailand returned the disputed Cambodian and Laos territories to France in October 1946 to secure the UN membership and avoid a French veto. Following the independence of both Laos and Cambodia from France in 1953 and the conclusion of the Second Indochina War, the rise of Marxist–Leninist regimes in 1975 took control of Cambodia by the Khmer Rouge (Cambodian Reds) in Phnom Penh, Saigon by the Viet Cong in Vietnam and Vientiane by the Pathet Lao in Laos, have radically altering regional alignment, Thailand chose a radically different path to preserve its national identity, its capitalist economy, and its traditional system of constitutional monarchy, firmly allied itself with both the United States and the West. Thailand resisted the communist wave of its neighbors sweeping through Indochina like dominoes of which three nations fell to communist regimes.

In 1983, on the occasion of the 150th anniversary of relations, it was revealed that President Jackson had given Nangklao a gold sword with designs of an elephant and an eagle chased on a gold handle. The king was also presented a proof set of American coins, which included the "King of Siam" 1804 dollar struck in 1834. The set, minus a Jackson gold medal, was purchased for a record $8.5 million by Steven L. Contursi on November 1, 2005, from an anonymous owner described as "a West Coast business executive", who purchased it for over $4 million four years before.

In May 1856, Townsend Harris, a representative of President Franklin Pierce, negotiated another American–Siamese Treaty with representatives of King Mongkut (Rama IV) that granted Americans additional extraterritorial rights. Stephen Mattoon, an American missionary who acted as Harris's translator, was appointed the first United States consul to Siam.

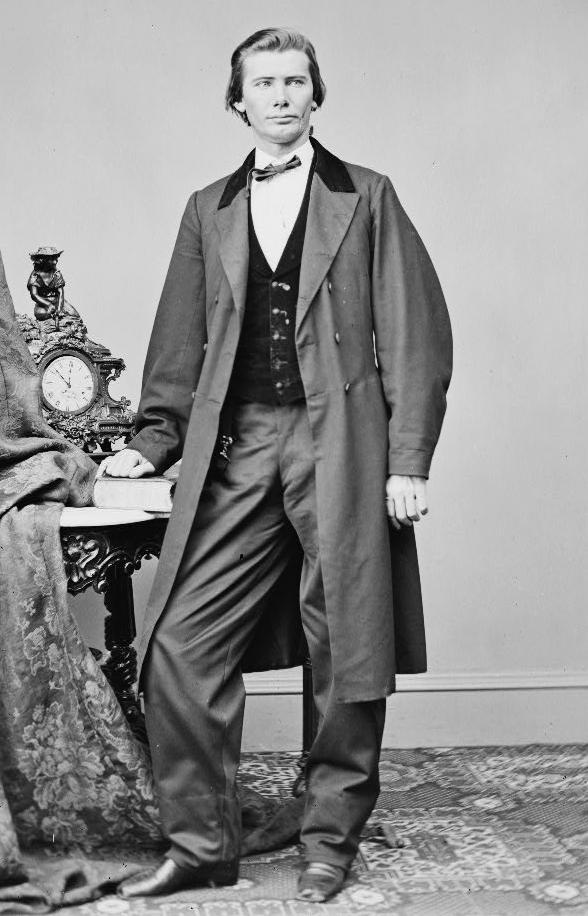
Sempronius H. Boyd, the third ambassador to Siam

During the presidency of James Buchanan, Mongkut, after receiving presents from the United States, offered elephants for breeding stock in return. The offer was received by President Abraham Lincoln, who courteously declined. This was dramatized in Rodgers and Hammerstein's play The King and I, which mentions in passing that the King planned to send war elephants to assist Lincoln in his "Great War".

The United States was largely focused on its own civil war and had limited official presence in the region compared to the European powers. Following the establishment of the Cambodian protectorate, France expanded its control over Vietnam (Cochinchina), which will later consolidated into the Union of French Indochina in 1887. Following a series of wars, the British completed their conquest of Burma in 1885, seizing Mandalay, deposing King Thibaw, and formally incorporating the country into the Indian Empire. Siam found itself positioned as a buffer state between British Burma to the west and French Indochina to the east, where Britain and France had divided their respective spheres of influence.

=== Early 20th century ===
Following the death of General Advisor in Foreign Affairs Gustave Rolin-Jaequemyns in 1902, Phya Suriyanuwat, the Siamese Minister in Paris, was instructed to find a replacement. Phya Suriya was unable to find a suitable candidate in Europe, and notified Phya Akaraj Varathon, the Siamese Minister in Washington, that under the circumstances, he had decided to engage an American. In 1903, former US diplomat Edward Henry Strobel took a leave of absence from his position as the Bemis Professor of International Law at Harvard School of Law to represent the Kingdom of Siam in The Hague at the International Peace Court—which Rolin-Jaequemyns had been instrumental in founding. In 1906, Strobel moved to Bangkok to take the position of general advisor, where he died January 15, 1908. Among his successors were Jens Westengard (1909–1914), Wolcott Pitkin (1915–1917), Eldon James, and Francis B. Sayre—all but for Pitkin former Harvard law professors. "The Siamese government trusted the American Adviser in Foreign Affairs to act in the best interests of Siam. Authority and responsibility were delegated to him. He was permitted a considerable degree of freedom in his work. It was in his capacity as a lawyer, a jurist, an advocate, and a policy counselor that the American adviser contributed significantly to the successful conclusion of the treaty negotiations with the West. The first U.S. White House state dinner of the twentieth century, and just the second White House state dinner ever, occurred in April of 1931, while King Prajadhipok was visiting America in order to get eye surgery. " An agreement on relations between the two countries was signed in Washington, D.C., on December 16, 1920.

=== World War II ===
During the 1940s, the Imperial Japanese Army invaded Thailand and Malaya. Thailand resisted landings on its territory for about 5 to 8 hours; it then signed a ceasefire and a Treaty of Friendship with Japan, later declaring war on the UK and the USA. The Japanese then proceeded overland across the Thai–Malayan border to attack Malaya. At this time, the Japanese began bombing Singapore.

=== SEATO ===
In 1954, Thailand joined the Southeast Asia Treaty Organization (SEATO) to become an active ally of the United States in the Cold War in Asia. In 1962, came the Thanat–Rusk communiqué in which the U.S. promised to defend Thailand and fund its military.

=== Vietnam War ===
Thailand was an active participant in the Vietnam War, serving as the third-largest provider of ground forces to South Vietnam and hosting nearly 50,000 US military personnel at its height. Thailand felt threatened by the North Vietnamese-backed insurgency in Laos and Cambodia, by the Khmer Rouge (Cambodian Reds) and Pathet Lao which was backed by the Viet Cong at the Ho Chi Minh Trail that would lead to a communist takeover in Bangkok. The Khmer Rouge captured Phnom Penh on 17 April 1975, and Saigon fell to North Vietnamese forces on 30 April, thirteen days later. Thailand became the first country in Southeast Asia to recognize the new Marxist–Leninist or Maoist government of Democratic Kampuchea under the rule of Angkar (The Organization) which came to power at the end of the Cambodian Civil War by the Constitution of Democratic Kampuchea once aided by Chairman Mao from Beijing, with Saloth Sâr (Pol Pot) who became "Brother Number One" as the Head of the Communist Party and Leader of the Nation. The Thai government formally recognized the Socialist Republic of Vietnam on 6 August 1976, one month after the reunification of the country, while the United States did not recognize the new nation until 1995, four years after the Cold War ended and the Soviet collapse, with America establishing a diplomatic relations. In November 2000, Bill Clinton became the first U.S. president to visit Vietnam.

=== Treaty of Amity (1966) ===
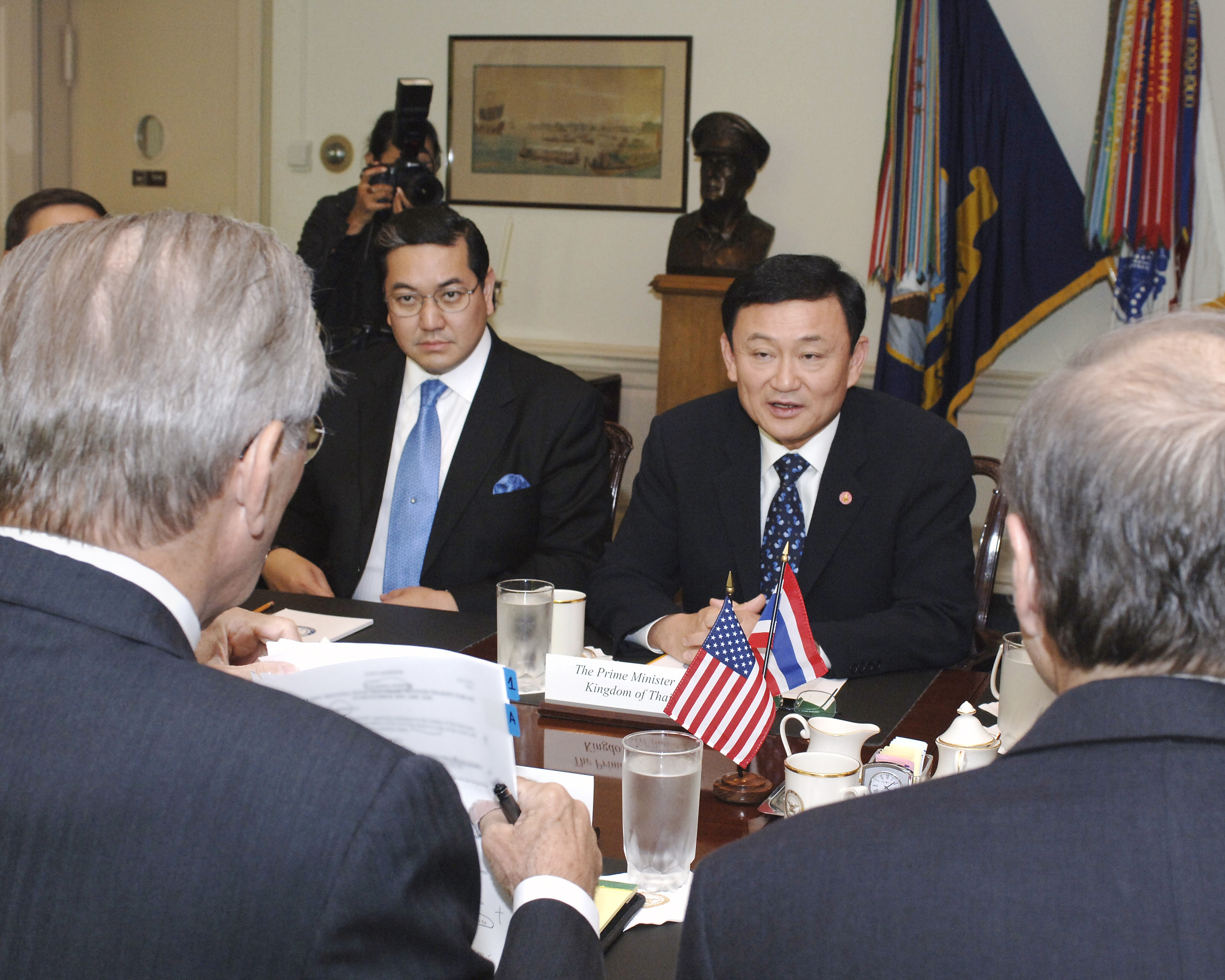
Thailand's prime minister Thaksin Shinawatra and deputy prime minister Surakiart Sathirathai meeting with U.S. secretary of defense Donald Rumsfeld on 19 September 2005

Since World War II, the United States and Thailand have developed close relations, as reflected in several bilateral treaties and by both countries' participation in UN multilateral activities and agreements. The principal bilateral arrangement is the 1966 Treaty of Amity and Economic Relations, which facilitates U.S. and Thai companies' economic access to one another's markets. Other important agreements address civil uses of atomic energy, sales of agricultural commodities, investment guarantees, and military and economic assistance.

== Political relations ==
=== Proposed FTA (2004–2006) ===
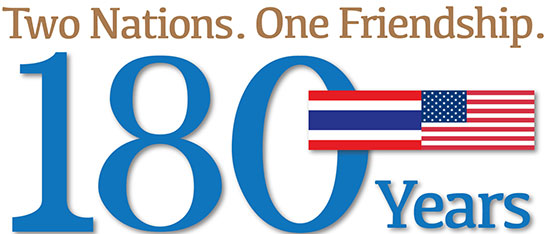
180 years of Thai US relations logo

In June 2004 the United States and Thailand initiated negotiations on a free trade agreement which, when concluded, will reduce and eliminate barriers to trade and investment between the two countries. These negotiations were placed on hold following the dissolution of the Thai parliament in February 2006 and the subsequent coup in September. The new military government issued compulsory licenses for several anti-HIV drugs, effectively ending the FTA negotiations. According to Thitinan Pongsudhirak, a political science professor at Chulalongkorn University, this has put bilateral relations on a "back burner".

=== 2014 Thai coup d'état ===
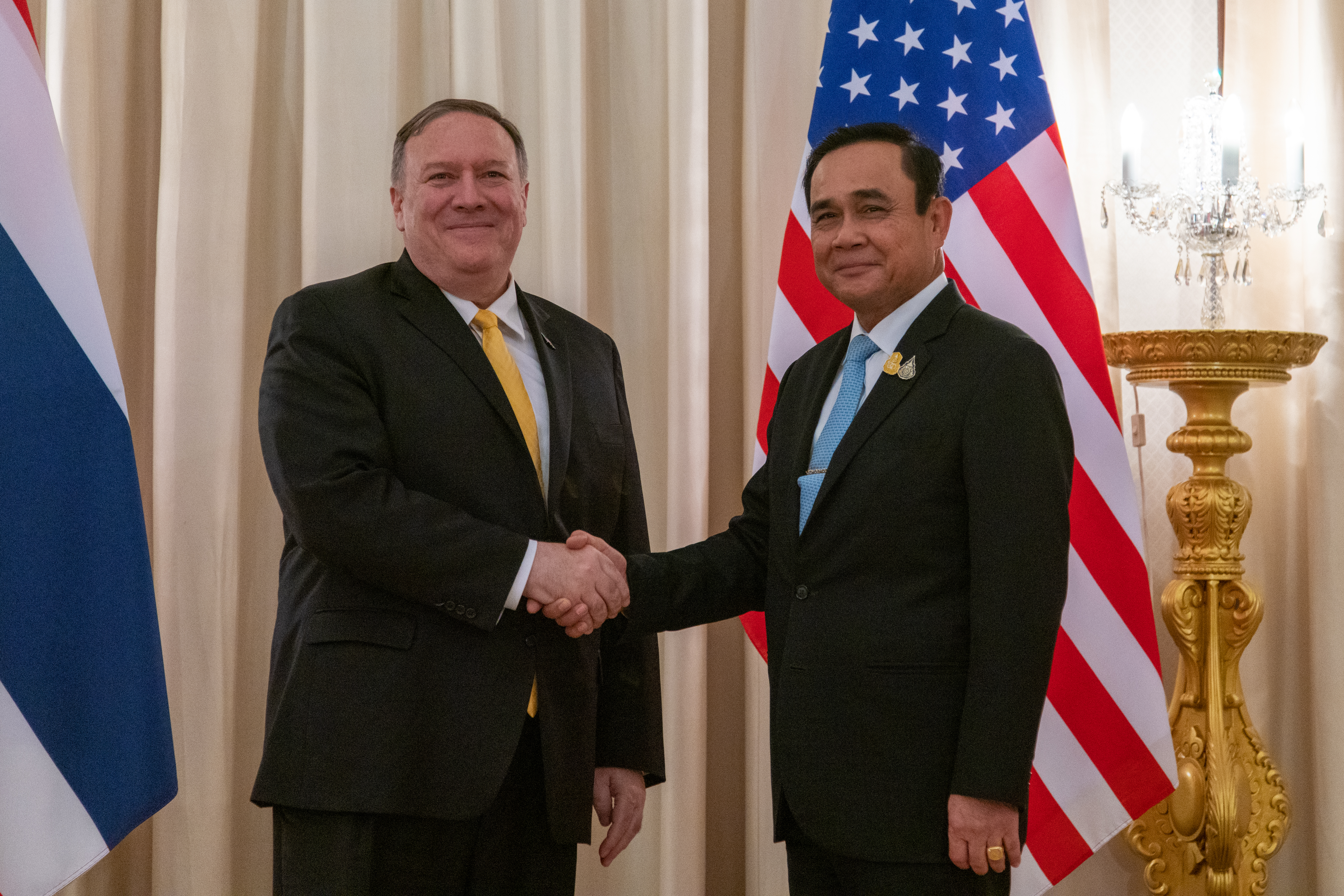
U.S. secretary of state Michael R. Pompeo meets with Thai prime minister Prayut Chan-o-cha on August 2, 2019

On 22 May 2014, the Royal Thai Armed Forces, led by General Prayut Chan-o-cha, Commander of the Royal Thai Army (RTA), launched a coup d'état against the caretaker government of Thailand, following six months of political crisis. US Secretary of State John Kerry issued a statement condemning the coup, saying that he was "disappointed" by the army's decision and "this act will have negative implications for the U.S.–Thai relationship, especially for our relationship with the Thai military".

=== 2020s relations ===
190 years of Thai–US relations logo

In 2022, Thailand and the US signed a communique on "strategic alliance and partnership". After 6 April 2022 to 13 August 2024Suvarnabhumi Airport nothing Non-stop flight to America

In 2025, Suvarnabhumi Airport had three direct flights and one non-stop flight to the US. One was Qantas Freight via Shanghai Pudong International Airport to Ted Stevens Anchorage International Airport. Another was Singapore Airlines Cargo via Incheon International Airport to Cincinnati/Northern Kentucky International Airport and AeroLogic Non-stop flight to Ted Stevens Anchorage International Airport

In April 2025, United Airlines had a flight to Suvarnabhumi Airport via Hong Kong International Airport from Los Angeles International Airport. Flights had been suspended following a downgrade in Thailand's safety category by the Federal Aviation Administration in 2015, from Category 1 to Category 2.

Thai Airways previously operated flights from Suvarnabhumi Airport in Bangkok to Los Angeles International Airport in Los Angeles and John F. Kennedy International Airport in New York City. United Airlines previously operated flights from Los Angeles International Airport, via Narita International Airport to Suvarnabhumi Airport inflight UA891, from O'Hare International Airport via Narita International Airport to Suvarnabhumi Airport inflight UA881, and from San Francisco International Airport via Narita International Airport to Suvarnabhumi Airport inflight UA837. Northwest Airlines previously operated flights from Daniel K. Inouye International Airport via Narita International Airport to Suvarnabhumi Airport inflight NW21 & NW 27.

On 8 April 2025, Dr. Paul Chambers, a U.S. citizen, was arrested in Thailand on lèse majesté charges and the Computer Crimes Act.

=== China ===
According to Stratfor, "Bangkok's support could prove pivotal for the United States in the years to come, as it presses war against militant Islamic groups in the region and prepares for the expansion of Chinese power". According to Crispin, however, it is "clear that Thailand fails to share the US's threat perception of China's rapid regional rise", trying to maintain strong relations with both the United States and China.

In the words of one analyst, "Despite being both a bilateral and multilateral US treaty ally, as well as holding major non-NATO status, Thailand has hardly factored into Washington's regional strategy." Since the Thai military coup in 2014 China has become Thailand's leading trading partner and its second largest source of foreign investment. Thailand's military budget for FY2017 includes the purchase of at least one Chinese submarine and Chinese armoured vehicles. China's premier became the first foreign national ever to address Thailand's parliament. Joint naval and marine exercises have been added to Sino-Thai army drills begun under Prime Minister Thaksin.

On February 28, 2025, the U.S. Embassy in Bangkok issued a security alert following Thailand’s deportation of 40 Uyghurs to China, citing past incidents where similar actions led to violent retaliation. A 2015 deportation of 100 Uyghurs was linked to a deadly bombing at a Bangkok shrine. The Japanese embassy also issued a warning, while Thai authorities did not immediately comment. In March 2025, the U.S. put visa restriction on current and former Thai officials concerning the deportations.

== Military relations ==
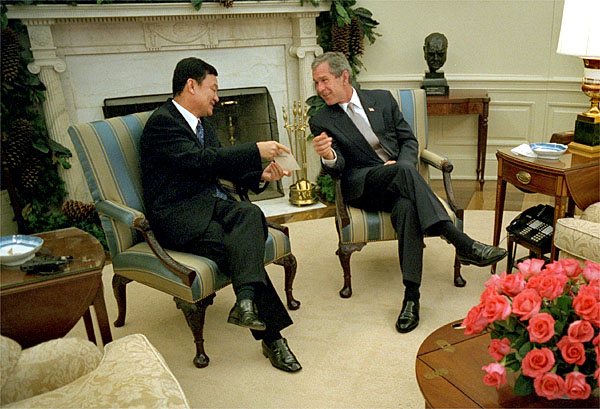
U.S. president George W. Bush meets with Thai prime minister Thaksin Shinawatra in the Oval Office, December 14, 2001

The United States and Thailand are among the signatories of the 1954 Manila pact of the former SEATO. Article IV(1) of this treaty provides that, in the event of armed attack in the treaty area (which includes Thailand), each member would "act to meet the common danger in accordance with its constitutional processes." Despite the dissolution of the SEATO in 1977, the Manila Pact remains in force and, together with the Thanat–Rusk communiqué of 1962, constitutes the basis of U.S. security commitments to Thailand. Thailand continues to be a key security ally in Asia, along with Australia, Japan, the Philippines, and South Korea. In December 2003, Thailand was designated a major non-NATO ally (MNNA).

Thailand has received U.S. military equipment, essential supplies, training, and assistance in the construction and improvement of facilities and installations for much of the period since 1950. The United States supplies sophisticated weapons systems to Thailand, which Thailand has at times used for domestic suppression. Over recent decades, U.S. security assistance included military training programs carried out in the United States and elsewhere. A small U.S. military advisory group in Thailand oversaw the delivery of equipment to the Royal Thai Armed Forces and the training of Thai military personnel in its use and maintenance. Funding for the International Military Education and Training and the Foreign Military Financing programs, along with selected other programs totaling US$29 million, was suspended following the September 19, 2006 coup d'état in Thailand. As part of their mutual defense cooperation over the last decade, Thailand and the United States have developed a vigorous joint military exercise program, which engages all the services of each nation and averages 40 joint exercises per year.

Thailand's U-Tapao Royal Thai Navy Airfield Support Airbus A380 is currently the "only facility in Southeast Asia capable of supporting large-scale logistical operations". Thailand has allowed the US to use U-Tapao to land and refuel after traveling across the Pacific Ocean on the way to US operations in Iraq and Afghanistan.

Military ties have frayed since the 2014 Thai coup d'état, after which the United States cut military financing and scaled back joint exercises, leading Thailand to increase purchase of Chinese weaponry. From 2023 to 2025, American military aid to Thailand fell from US$106 million to US$8 million. In September 2026, the USS Abraham Lincoln docked at Laem Chabang port for the crew to deal with "mental health challenges" after deploying to the Persian Gulf of the Iranian war.

=== Counter-narcotics ===
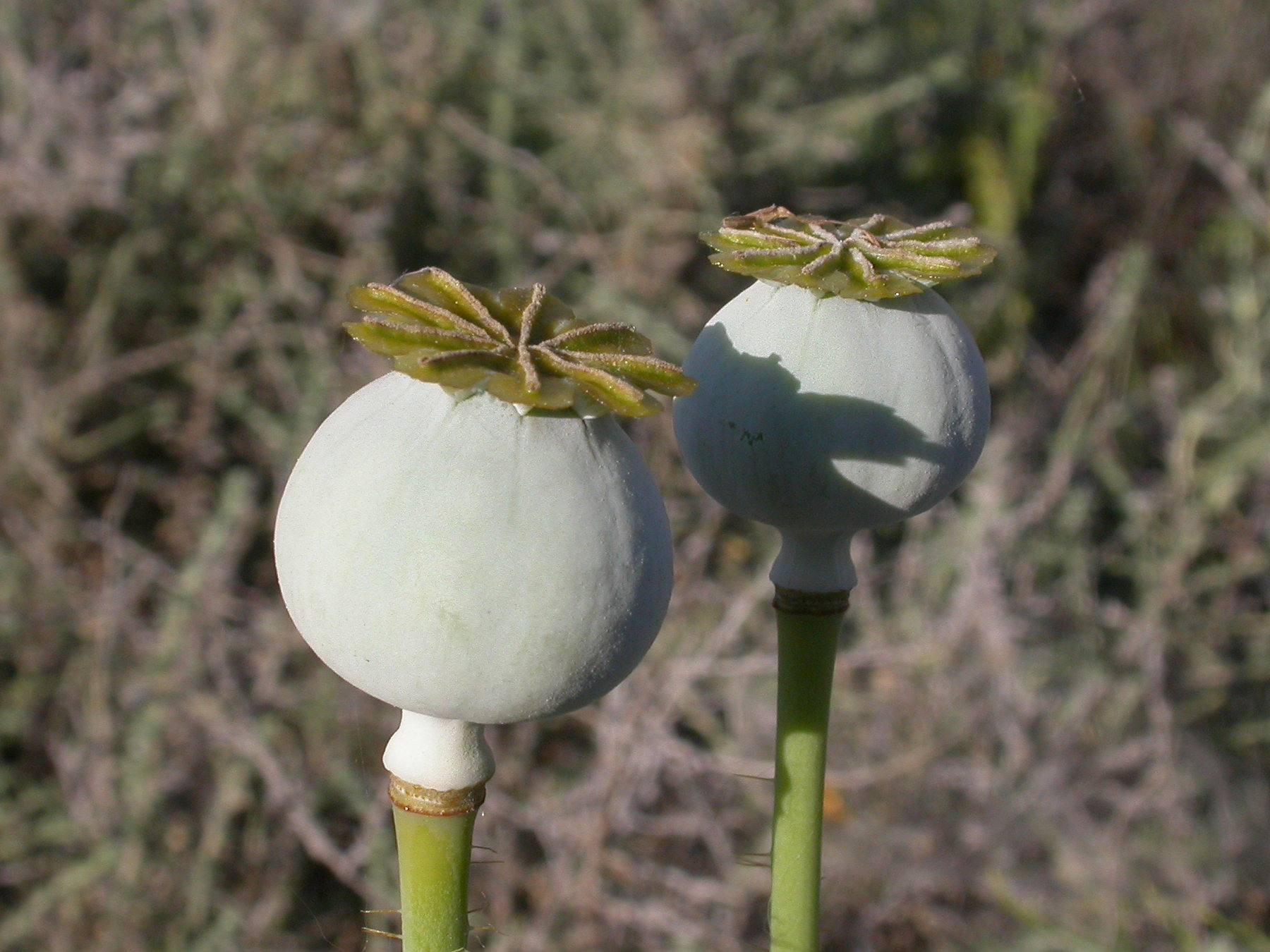
The Burma-Laos-Thailand border is known as the Golden Triangle

Thailand remains a trafficking route for narcotics from the Golden Triangle—the intersection of Burma, Laos, and Thailand—to both the domestic Thai and international markets. The large-scale production and shipment of opium and heroin shipments from Burma of previous years have largely been replaced by widespread smuggling of methamphetamine tablets (ya ba), although heroin seizures along the border continue to take place with some frequency. The United States and Thailand work closely together and with the United Nations on a broad range of programs to halt illicit drug trafficking and use and other criminal activity. The U.S. supports the International Law Enforcement Academy (ILEA) in Bangkok, which provides counter-narcotics and anti-crime capacity-building programs to law enforcement and judicial officials from a number of regional countries.

According to Barry McCaffrey, a US four-star general, "the excellent U.S.-Thai counter-narcotics relationship has been an enormous success and stimulus for greater regional cooperation".

=== War on terror ===
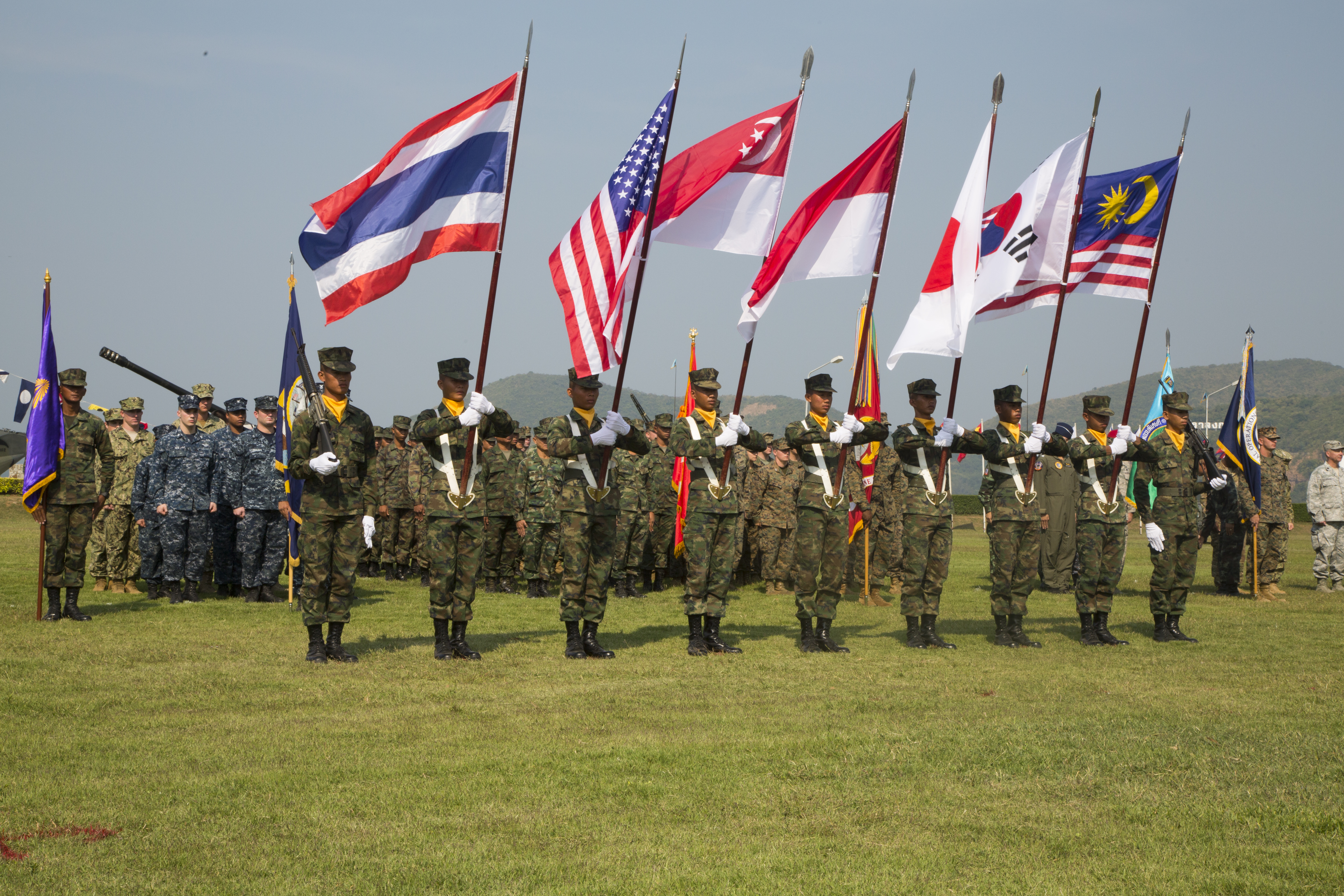
Multinational service members stand in formation during the opening ceremony for Exercise Cobra Gold at the Royal Thai Marine Corps Headquarters in Sattahip, Thailand

Thailand has been important to the US war on terror, "providing access to military facilities, sharing information on the movements of terrorist organizations and suspected terrorists, offering military engineering and medical personnel to support reconstruction efforts in Afghanistan". The most visible element of this cooperation was a joint operation between the CIA and Thai police which captured Riduan Isamuddin (better known by his nom de guerre, Hambali) in 2003.

According to Shawn Crispin, the Asia Times Southeast Asia editor, Thailand represents one of the U.S.'s "once strong, now strained bilateral alliances". Crispin surmises that the long history of bilateral cooperation and Thai fears of China's rise enabled Bush to have "his way with Thailand". The US war on terror combined with Thailand's southern Islamic insurgency has created tension, particularly with Thailand's People's Alliance for Democracy (PAD). The U.S. has pressured and enabled Thailand to crack down on the insurgency with more proactive military force.

In 2008, Thai courts refused to turn over Jamshid Ghassemi, an Iranian national accused of missile parts smuggling to the US, the "first-ever failed extradition" between Thailand and the US. US-Thai friction also increased when Thailand refused to quickly extradite Russian arms dealer Viktor Bout, according to Crispin, signalling that "Washington is slowly but surely losing influence over its long time strategic ally". Crispin viewed it as "no doubt significant" that Secretary of State Hillary Clinton chose to visit Indonesia, but not Thailand, on her first trip to Southeast Asia.

== Economic relations ==
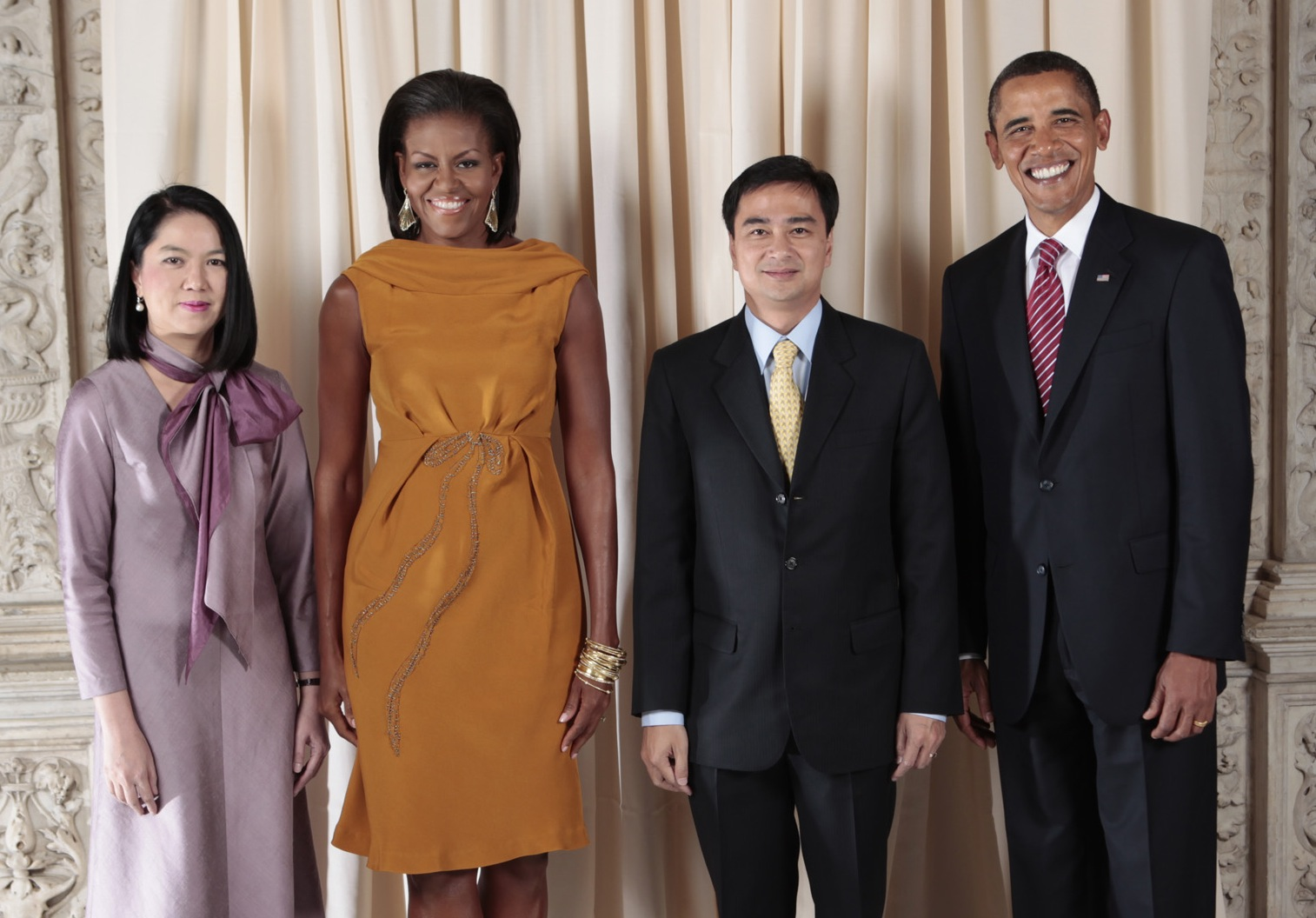
Prime Minister Abhisit Vejjajiva, Pimpen Vejjajiva, U.S. President Barack Obama and Michelle Obama on 23 September 2009, in New York

=== Foreign assistance ===
Economic assistance has been extended in various fields, including rural development, health, family planning, education, and science and technology. The formal U.S. Agency for International Development (USAID) program ended in 1995. However, there are a number of targeted assistance programs which continue in areas of mutually defined importance, including: health and HIV/AIDS programming; refugee assistance; and trafficking in persons. The U.S. Peace Corps in Thailand has approximately 100 volunteers, focused on primary education, with an integrated program involving teacher training, health education, and environmental education.

=== Trade ===
The United States is Thailand's third largest trading partner after Japan and China. In 2006 merchandise imports from Thailand totaled US$22.5 billion, and merchandise exports totalled US$8.2 billion. The U.S., Japan, Taiwan, Singapore, and the European Union are among Thailand's largest foreign investors. American investment, concentrated in the petroleum and chemicals, finance, consumer products, and automobile production sectors, is estimated at US$21 billion.

As of 2021, "Thailand remains on the US Trade Representative's (USTR) watch list (WL) as it attempts to suppress intellectual property (IP) violations and online piracy", according to Bangkok Post.

The US, under the Second Trump administration, plans to restrict its AI chip shipments to Thailand over Chinese smuggling concerns in July 2025. That same month, the US threatened Thailand to impose 36% tariffs on all Thai imports. In response, Thailand proposed cutting tariffs to zero on many US imports to prevent high tariffs on its products.

=== Rice subsidies ===
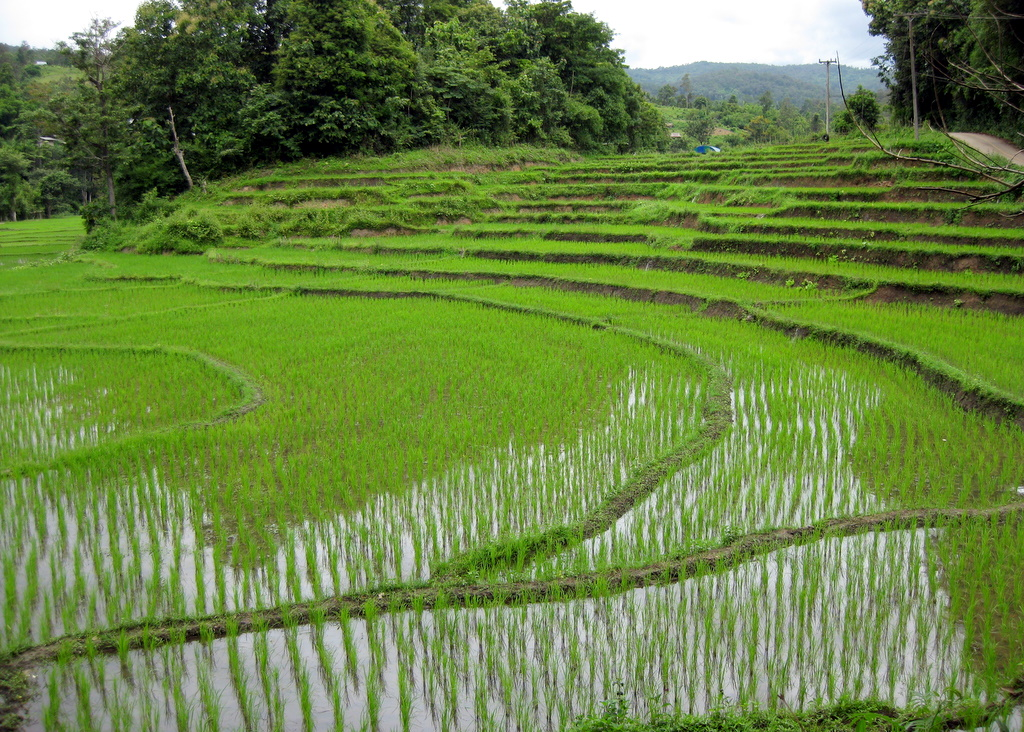
Rice production in Thailand employs approximately two-thirds of the population, causing friction over US rice subsidies

Since the 1980s, US farm subsidies for rice, along with copyright and patent issues, have constituted the "major problems in U.S.-Thai trade ties". The rice subsidy was one of the primary obstacles to the negotiation of a bilateral FTA. Approximately two-thirds of Thailand's population are rice farmers, and the U.S. subsidy "severely strains U.S.-Thai relations as Bangkok finds itself unable to explain the income lost to its 35 million rice farmers". USDA-funded research to produce variants of Jasmine rice capable of growing in the US are viewed as biopiracy by many Thai rice farmers. In 2005, Thai rice farmers gathered outside the US embassy to chant a "traditional ritual to bring misfortune to enemies". Farmer protests also occurred outside the US embassy during the 2001 WTO ministerial meeting in Doha.

Thai officials "sharply criticized" the Farm Security and Rural Investment Act of 2002, and retaliated by joining two WTO dispute resolution cases against the US: one against anti-dumping subsidy offsets, and the Shrimp-Turtle Case. According to Oxfam, the US spends US$1.3 billion on rice subsidies annually for a crop that costs US$1.8 billion to grow, allowing the US to become the second largest global rice exporter (after Thailand) and dump rice at 34 percent below the cost of production. Following the election of Obama and the 2008 financial crisis, there were Thai fears of renewed US protectionism.

== Educational relations ==
As of 2013, there were 7,314 international students of Thai origin studying in the United States, accounting for 0.9 percent of all foreigners pursuing higher education in America.

== Public opinions ==
According to a 2012 Gallup public opinion poll, 60% of Thais approved of U.S. leadership, while 14% disapproved. According to a 2026 Pew Research Center survey, 36% of Thais had a favorable view of the United States, while 63% had a negative view.

== Embassies ==
The U.S. maintains an embassy in Bangkok, one of the largest in the world, and a consulate in the northern city of Chiang Mai. Thailand maintains an embassy in Washington, D.C., and consulates in New York City, Chicago, and Los Angeles.

Principal U.S. Embassy Officers were, in 2024:

- Ambassador — Robert F. Godec
- Deputy Chief of Mission — Gwendolyn Cardno
- Political Counselor — Dena Brownlow
- Economic Counselor — Andrew Shaw
- Public Affairs Officer — Dick Custin
- Consul General — Kathryn Flachsbart
- Management Counselor — Margaret MacCallum
- International Narcotics and Law Enforcement Affairs (INL) — Roshni Nirody
- Regional Security Officer — Anton Kort

== Black site ==
The CIA reportedly operated a "black site" in Thailand where terrorist suspects were interrogated and tortured, prior to incarceration at Guantanamo Bay Detention Camp. It is referred to as a "black site" as its existence is not acknowledged by the US government. Every Thai government since 2002 has also denied its existence. The site has been variously referred to as "Detention Site Green" and "Cat's Eye". Its whereabouts has remained secret despite media efforts to uncover its location. Some experts believe it was at a US installation in Udon Thani Province. Some say it was at an air base southeast of Bangkok used by US forces as a refueling hub for flights to Afghanistan. Others point to a section of Bangkok's Don Mueang International Airport controlled by the Royal Thai Air Force. The site was reportedly closed down in December 2002.

== See also ==
- Foreign relations of France
- Foreign relations of the United States
- Foreign relations of Thailand
- Thai Americans
- France–Thailand relations
