= Bemis (Watertown, Massachusetts) =

Neighborhood in southwestern Watertown, Massachusetts

Coordinates: 42.37°N 71.20°W

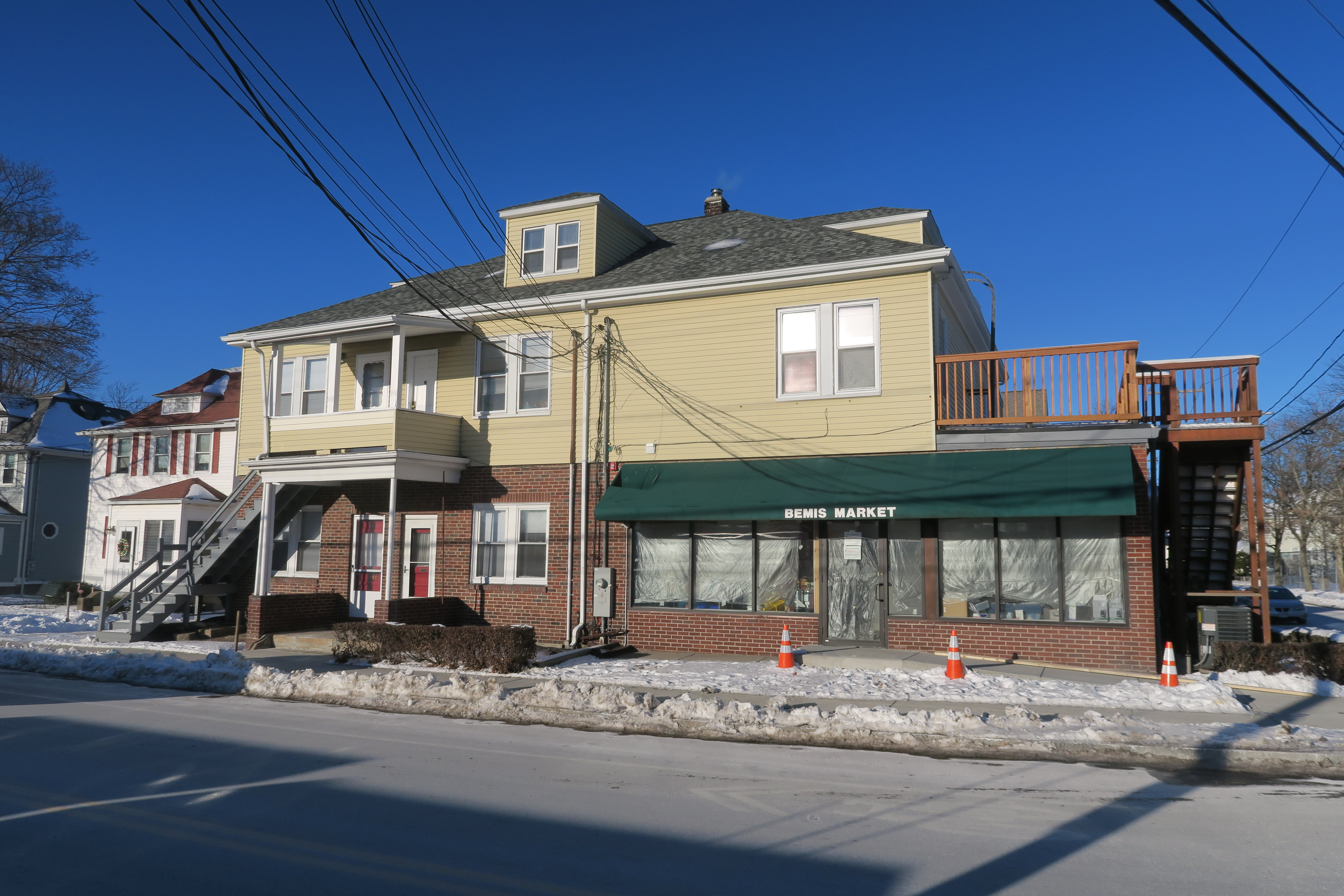
Bemis Market

Bemis is a neighborhood located in the southwest corner of Watertown, Massachusetts, United States. It is bounded by Main Street to the north, the Charles River to the south, and the City of Waltham to the west. The neighborhood derives its name from Seth Bemis (1775–1851), who ran mills on both sides of the river near Bridge Street, including the Bemis Mill, which is located just across the Charles River at 1–3 Bridge Street, in Newton, and is listed on the National Register of Historic Places. Seth was the father of George Bemis (October 13, 1816 – January 5, 1878), a successful lawyer and legal scholar. Bemis Park is located in this neighborhood.
