= Treaty of Amity and Commerce =

Treaty of Amity and Commerce may refer to:

- Treaty of Amity and Commerce (United States–France) (1778)
- Treaty of Amity and Commerce (United States–Dutch Republic), a 1782 United States treaty
- Treaty of Amity and Commerce (United States–Sweden) (1783)
- Treaty of Amity and Commerce (Prussia–United States) (1785)
- Treaty of Amity and Commerce (United States-Siam) or Siamese-American Treaty of Amity and Commerce (1833)
- Treaty of Amity and Commerce (U.K.-Siam) or Bowring Treaty (1855)
- Treaty of Amity and Commerce (U.K.-Japan) or Anglo-Japanese Treaty of Amity and Commerce (1858)
- Treaty of Amity and Commerce (France-Japan) (1858)
- Treaty of Amity and Commerce (United States–Japan) or Harris Treaty (1858)
- Treaty of Amity and Commerce (Prussia–Japan) (1861)
- Treaty of Amity and Commerce (United States-Joseon/Korea) or Joseon-American Treaty of Amity and Commerce (1882)
- Treaty of Amity and Commerce (China-Macau) or Sino-Portuguese Treaty ceding (1887)
- Treaty of Amity and Commerce (United States-Korea) or Korean-American Treaty of Amity and Commerce (1897)

== See also ==
- Jay Treaty or Treaty of Amity, Commerce, and Navigation, Between His Britannic Majesty and the United States of America, a 1794 treaty between the United States and Britain
- Sino-Philippine Treaty of Amity (1947)
- Treaty of Amity and Economic Relations (Thailand–United States) (1966)
- Treaty of Friendship
