= Treaty of Bangkok (disambiguation) =

Treaty of Bangkok or Bangkok Treaty may refer to:

- Burney Treaty (20 June 1826)
- Siamese–American Treaty of Amity and Commerce (14 April 1836)
- Bowring Treaty (18 April 1855)
- American–Siamese Treaty of 1856 (29 May)
- Franco-Siamese Treaty of 1856 (15 August)
- Franco-Siamese Treaty of 1893 (3 October)
- Franco-Siamese Treaty of 1907 (23 March)
- Anglo-Siamese Treaty of 1909 (10 March)
- Treaty between Thailand and Japan Concerning the Continuance of Friendly Relations and the Mutual Respect of Each Other's Territorial Integrity (23 December 1940)
- Australian–Thai Peace Treaty (3 April 1946)
- Treaty of Amity and Economic Relations (Thailand–United States) (29 May 1966)
- Treaty of Amity and Cooperation in Southeast Asia (24 February 1976)
- Southeast Asian Nuclear-Weapon-Free Zone Treaty (15 December 1995)
