= Law of Thailand =

The laws of Thailand are based on the civil law, but have been influenced by common law (see also world legal systems).

== Sources of law ==
The Rattanakosin Kingdom and the four traditionally counted preceding kingdoms, collectively called Siam, had a largely uncodified constitution until 1932. In the King of Siam's preamble to the penal code promulgated on 1 April 1908, and came into effect on 21 September, the king said: "In the ancient times the monarchs of the Siamese nation governed their people with laws which were originally derived from the Dhamasustra of Manu, which was then the prevailing law among the inhabitants of India and the neighbouring countries."

The principal law sources in Thailand are:

- Constitution of Thailand - prevails over other laws.
- Acts and statutes - Many of which created and amended the 4 basic codes: Civil and Commercial Code (CCC), Penal Code (PC), Civil Procedure Code, and the Criminal Procedure Code. Newer codes include the Land Code and the Revenue Code. Years on Thai statutes are dated with the Buddhist Era (BE) year based on the Thai solar calendar.
- Emergency decree or royal proclamation - these are issued by the king, upon the advice of the cabinet, where an urgent law is needed for national security, public safety, national economic stability, or to avert a public calamity. An example is the Emergency Decree on Public Administration in Emergency Situation BE 2548 (2005).
- Treaties
- Subordinate legislation - Regulations (ministerial), orders, notifications, royal decrees, and rules.
- Supreme Court opinions and other judicial decisions - Judicial precedent in Thailand is not binding. Courts are not bound to follow their own decisions. Lower courts are not bound to follow precedents set by higher courts. However, Thai law has been influenced by common law precedent. Courts are therefore significantly influenced by earlier decisions or decisions of higher courts. The Supreme Court of Justice publishes its decisions, known as "Supreme Court Opinions". These are frequently used as secondary authorities and are numbered according to the year issued. Other judicial decisions or rulings are published by the Administrative Court and the Constitutional Court.

== Public law ==
=== Constitutional law ===
The Constitution of Thailand is the supreme law of Thailand which prevails over other laws passed by parliament. The 2017 constitution of Thailand is the most recent constitution. The Constitutional Court of Thailand has jurisdiction to make rulings over the constitutionality of parliamentary acts, royal decrees, draft legislation, appointment and removal of public officials and issues regarding political parties and civil liberties.

=== Criminal law ===
Criminal offences (that can lead to arrest and imprisonment) are enumerated in the Thai Penal Code (or Criminal Code) as well as numerous other statutes. Criminal procedures are outlined in the Criminal Procedure Code.

- Drug offences in Thailand are governed by the Narcotics Code BE 2564 (2021), which was published in the government gazette on November 8, 2021, and came into effect on December 9, 2021. The Code consolidates and replaces several previous statutes including the Narcotics Act BE 2522 (1979), the Psychotropic Substances Act BE 2518 (1975), and the Narcotics Control Act BE 2519 (1976), becoming the main law governing the manufacture, import, export, sale, possession, and use of narcotics in Thailand. The Code is structured into three books: Prevention, Suppression, and Narcotics Control; Treatment and Social Rehabilitation for Narcotics Addicts; and Penalties. The Code defines and classifies narcotics, psychotropic substances, and volatile substances, while detailing offences and punishments. Penalties for producing, importing, or exporting narcotics are outlined in Book III, Title 4.
- The offence of lèse majesté is found in the Criminal Code. Article 112 states that "Whoever defames, insults or threatens the King, Queen, the Heir-apparent or the Regent, shall be punished (with) imprisonment of three to fifteen years" (see also lèse majesté in Thailand).

=== Administrative law ===
Administrative law matters such as judicial review are handled by the Administrative Court, which was established under The Act on Establishment of Administrative Courts and Administrative Court Procedure BE 2542 (1999). The jurisdiction of the court includes unlawful act by an administrative agency or State official (e.g., ultra vires, inconsistent with law, bad faith etc.), neglecting or unreasonable delay in official duties, wrongful act or other liability of an administrative agency, administrative contracts, mandating a person to do something or an injunction.

==== Immigration law ====
Visa and immigration law is outlined in the Immigration Act BE 2522 (1979) and its amendments. The Immigration Bureau of the Royal Thai Police administers the law, while the Immigration Commission shall have power and duty to make decision such as giving or revoking permission to stay.

== Private law ==
The most important reference of private law (or civil law) is the Civil and Commercial Code of Thailand (see also other civil codes). It is composed of several books. Books I and II were first promulgated on 11 November 1925 (BE 2466). The Civil code is updated as required by amendment acts (for example Act Amending Civil and Commercial Code (No 14) BE 2548 ( The Law of Obligations in general is found in Civil and Commercial Code sections 194 to 353 (Book II, Title I).

Quasi-contracts include undue enrichment, sections 406 to 419 (Book II, Title IV), and management of affairs without mandate, sections 395 to 405 (Book II, Title III).

The main source of contract law is the Civil and Commercial Code sections 354 to 394 (Book II, Title II). Specific contracts (Sale, Hire, Mortgage, Insurance, Bills etc.) are found in the Civil and Commercial Code sections 453 to 1011 (Book III, Titles I to XXI).

=== Tort or delict law ===
Tort law or delict law falls within the law of obligations. It is found in the Civil and Commercial Code sections 420 to 452 (Book II, Title V). The Code deals with wrongful acts: liability, compensation and exemptions to liability (justifiable acts).

=== Corporate law ===
Basic corporate law is found in the Civil and Commercial Code sections 1012 to 1273 (Book II, Title XXII). Foreign ownership of certain Thai industries and foreign companies in general are regulated by the Foreign Business Act BE 2542 (1999).

=== Personal property law ===
The main source of property law is the Civil and Commercial Code sections 1298 to 1434 (Book IV).

=== Land law ===
Land law is dealt with by the Land Code. This was established by Act Promulgating the Land Code, B.E. 2497 (1954).

Land in Thailand is covered by a system consisting of several title deeds offering different rights of use, possession, ownership or alienation. Most titles are issued by the Land Department and fall within seven main categories. Another five categories are issued by other government departments for specific purposes.

The Chanote (or Nor Sor 4 Jor) category, found in more developed parts of Thailand, offers private ownership (similar to freehold land). Other land is considered to belong to the government or the King of Thailand.

=== Intellectual property ===
Intellectual property law, that is patents, trademarks and copyright, are protected by the Patent Act BE 2522 (1979), Trademark Act BE 2534 (1991) and the Copyright Act BE 2537 (1994) and their amendments respectively. Trade secrets are protected by the Trade Secrets Act BE 2545 (2002). The Department of Intellectual Property (DIP) manages intellectual property matters such as registration and enforcement. A registration system exists for trademarks and patents. Copyright is automatically protected for 50 years and does not need registration, however it can be filed with the DIP. Disputes are first heard in the Intellectual Property and International Trade Court.

==== Patents ====
Patent protection in Thailand aims to support innovators who introduce new proprietary technologies. A firm reaps several benefits from registering a patent. First, the patentee gets exclusive rights to shield himself from others making, using, selling, or distributing the invention or design without permission. Second, a granted patent increases business value. Third, a granted patent is enforceable. Patent protection helps a business gain a competitive advantage and helps it obtain a return on investment (ROI) to defray research and development costs. Thailand uses an "absolute novelty" and "first to file" patent system, making confidentiality a must until a patent application date is registered.

Three types of patents can be granted: invention patents, petty patents, and design patents:

===== Invention patents =====
As with European patent law, Thai patent law, under Section 5 of the Patent Act 1979 (as amended in 1992, 1999), grants patents to an invention that (1) is non-obvious (involves an inventive step), (2) is novel, and (3) is capable of industrial application. Under Thai law, an innovation is understood to mean an invention step, if "it is not obvious to a person...skilled in the art."

According to the Manual of Patent and Petty Patent Applications Examination, "an invention must provide a benefit or improvement in occurrence of at least one of the following:

1. effect of design/form
2. task
3. selection
4. requirement of a problem and solution
5. effort
6. non-simplification
7. concentration of developmental steps
8. economic success
9. scientific technical research
10. progressive
11. achievements by the invention
12. non-exchangeable compounds
13. surprising results

The invention patent confers an exclusivity period of 20 years from its registration date.

====== Software patents ======
Computer software is unpatentable under Thai Patent law. Section 9 of the Thai Patent Act 1999 states that Thai patent law does not include software (or computer programs) as patentable because computer software is not considered an "invention". Software is considered to be merely a set of instructions to a machine.

Software patents in Thailand have sparked software patent debates among economists and developers as there are two significant developments in international patent law: (1) the European Union's attempt to harmonize national patent laws by the Proposal for a Directive of the European Parliament and Council on the patentability of computer-implemented inventions, and (2) the US court decision to expand patent protection to business methods. Opinions are divided. Dr. Tangkitvanich, an IT specialist at the Thailand Development Research Institute (TDRI), raised the concern that Thailand is not ready for software patents as there were several flaws in patent rights. For example, the business method prevention has high tendency to hinder the growth in innovations especially for infant software companies. Moreover, the software patent may cause monopoly and innovation problems. "Monopoly will thwart innovations of new software products, particularly open-source software", said a group of Thai economists. However, Dr. Hirapruk who is the Director of Software Park Thailand, on the other hand, provides his support on allowing the computer programs to be patentable: "Thailand had to provide a patent-right protection for computer software to ensure foreign high-tech investors that software producers' creativity would be secured from violations in Thailand." As a result, Mr. Sribhibhadh, president of the Association of the Thai Software Industry, emphasized that there will need to be a clear overview of the impact on the local industry if Thailand really had to fully implement the patent right protections.

===== Petty patents =====
A petty patent (known as a utility model in other countries) can be granted if an invention does not involve an inventive step, but is capable of industrial application. Unlike an invention patent, a petty patent has an exclusivity term of 10 years with an initial patent protection period of six years and two possible extensions of two years each.

A petty patent is suitable for a new invention which would qualify for an invention patent except that it has no strong, technical innovative step. To be more specific, petty patents have been widely used among Thai companies, especially for manufacturing companies and inventors of less complicated inventions. This is because the petty patent has relatively simple criteria.

===== Design patents =====
A design patent is granted based on the ornamental aspects or aesthetics of a product, including features pertaining to its shape, configuration, or pattern. For example, it may be granted for new qualifying three-dimensional designs or two-dimensional designs. The length of patent protection is 10 years from registration date. Unlike an invention patent, the main benefit of a design patent is the less stringent requirements as it requires only novelty and capability of industrial application.

In Thailand, design patents are popular in design-heavy industries such as car manufacturers, beverage companies, and furniture designers.

=== Family law ===
The main source of family law is the Civil and Commercial Code sections 1435 to 1598 (Book V).

=== Succession law ===
The main source of succession law is the Civil and Commercial Code sections 1599 to 1755 (Book VI).

== Laws relating to foreigners ==
The Foreign Business Act of 1999 regulates foreign ownership of certain Thai industries and foreign companies. The Alien Business Law (N.E.C. Announcement 281) prohibits foreigners from holding certain professions which are reserved for Thai nationals.

== See also ==
- Judiciary of Thailand
- Royal Thai Government Gazette - Thailand's public journal that publishes laws at which point they generally come into force
- Thai labour law
- Gun laws in Thailand
