= Nonantum, Massachusetts =

- Village
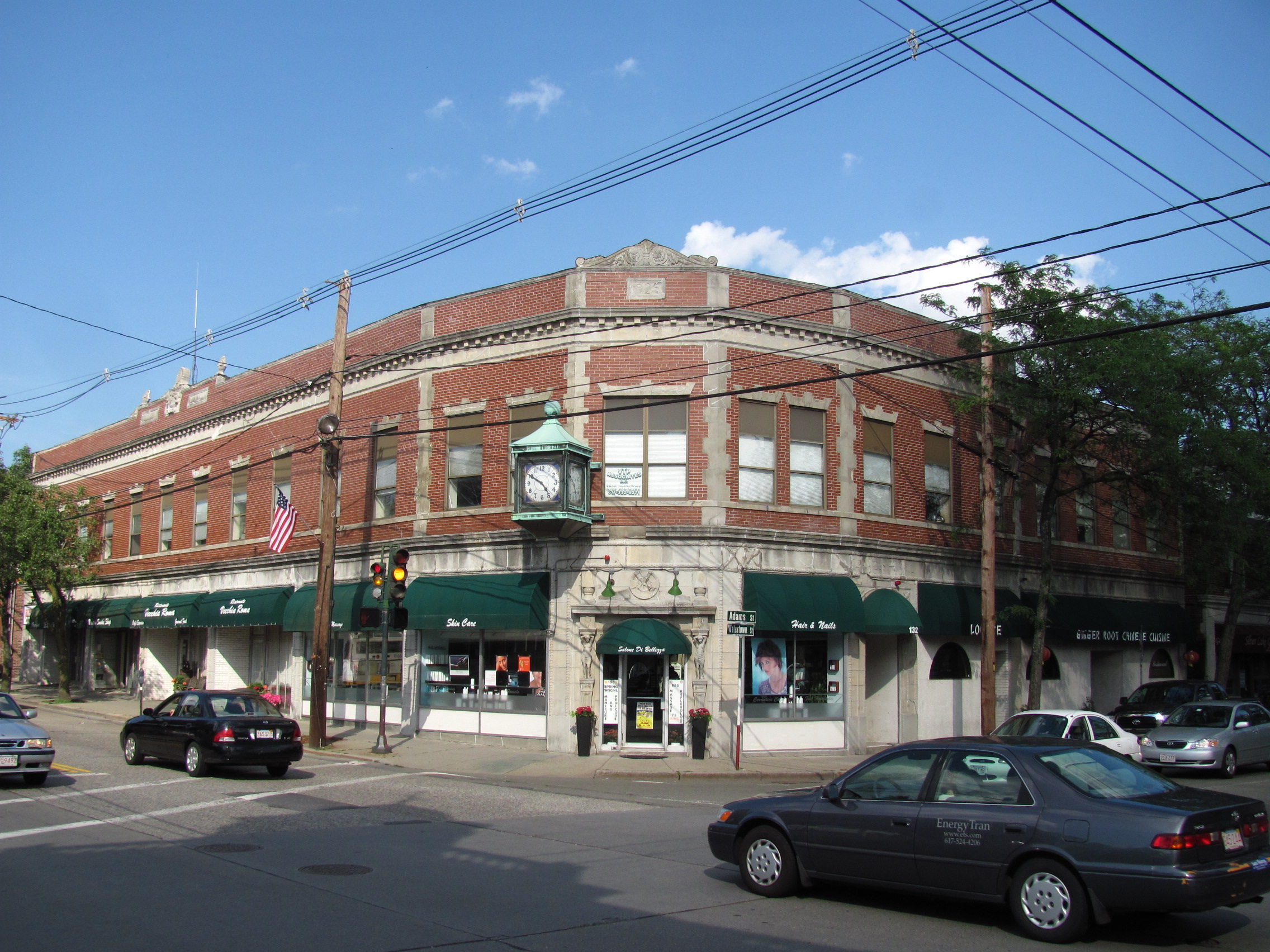
- The Columbus Building, at the northeastern corner of Watertown and Adams Streets

- Location within Massachusetts Location within the United States
- Coordinates: 42°21′45″N 71°12′08″W
- Country: United States
- State: Massachusetts
- County: Middlesex
- City: Newton
- Time zone: UTC-5 (Eastern (EST))
  - Summer (DST): UTC-4 (EDT)
- ZIP code: 02495

Nonantum (from Massachusett "I bless it"), also known as Silver Lake or The Lake, is one of the thirteen villages within the city of Newton in Middlesex County, Massachusetts, United States, located along the Charles River at the site of a former lake. The village is one of the centers of Italian population in Newton. The commercial area has numerous restaurants and food establishments featuring Italian cuisine.

== History ==
In 1637, Nonantum was the name given by the General Assembly of the Massachusetts Bay Colony to a village in what is today Newton Corner that it set aside for converted Native American as a result of missionary work by John Eliot at the home of Waban, often identified as the first Massachusett to convert to Christianity, although there is no evidence of his conversion. The current neighborhood of Nonantum was originally called the North Village, and took the name only when the Nonantum Worsted Company bought the neighborhood's Dalby Mills in the 1880s, becoming the major employer. European settlers claimed ownership of this land and forced Waban and his people to relocate to Natick, then divided it into small farms. The region was originally called Cohannet by the Indigenous people but renamed Nonantum by the settlers. Nonantum was the first village of "praying Indians" gathered by Eliot, for which it was given the name "I bless it."

Starting in 1778, when a paper mill was established by David Bemis (father of Seth Bemis) on the Charles River at Bridge Street, industrial uses replaced farming, and Nonantum became a site for production of cottons, woolens, and rope. Industrial work brought Irish, French Canadian, Italian, and Jewish immigrants to the village.

Silver Lake was a site of winter recreation for neighborhood children, who cleared the snow each winter and played hockey on it through the 1950s. It was filled with construction rubble and built over from the 1930s until its total demise in 1971.

== Lake Talk ==
Lake Talk is a cryptolect spoken particularly among older Italian-American residents. The origins of Lake Talk are unclear. A 2001 article in the Boston Globe speculated that it is a blend of Italian and some World War II code, but others have seen similarities to Angloromani or Italian Romany slang. In the late 1800s and early 1900s natives of Castelvenere, a town and comune in the Province of Benevento, Campania region, Italy, settled in Nonantum, the first Italian immigrants. Many people in the village now who claim they were the first to discover the "Lake" are descendants of natives of San Donato Val di Comino in the Province of Frosinone, Lazio, Italy.

According to the article, examples of words and phrases in Lake Talk include:

- mush (pronounced to rhyme with push) -- "guy" or "man", likely from Romani mursh
- chabby -- "boy child", likely from Romani chavo
- chor'd -- "stolen", likely related to Romani choro ("thief")
- chuccuo (chu-co, also pronounced as "chew-ch") -- "donkey", "ass", likely from Neapolitan ciuccio
- cuya moi -- "shut up" or "go to hell"
- divia (div-ya) -- "crazy", "jerk, screw-up, or harmless screwball", can be used as a noun or an adjective: "The mush is a real divya," or "This mush is divya"
- inga -- "unattractive" or "bad-tempered person" or "junk" or "crap"
- jival -- "chick", "woman", likely from Romani džuvel
- mush has a cormunga in his cover -- "guy is hiding a gun"
- mush is the earie -- "the guy is listening"
- over-chay or overchay (ova-chay) -- "it's a lie" or "he's an actor." Directly translates as "overkill". Better defined as exaggeration or equivocation
- oy -- "eat"
- pissa -- "awesome"
- pukka to the mush -- "tell the guy"
- quister jival (quest-ah jival) -- "pretty woman"
- quister (also pronounced as "quish-ta") meaning awesome, good, beautiful
- quister mush (quest-ah mush) -- "good, standup guy"
- shapdude (shup-dude) -- "how's it going?"
- wonga -- "money", "That mush has a lotta' wonga"
- geech -- "go away"
- gash -- "feminine man", likely from Romani gadži
- jawl -- "steal" or "look at"
- dikki ki dotti -- "unreal or unbelievable"
- minje -- "dirty or unattractive woman", likely from Romani mindž
- suv -- "to have sexual relations"
- corey-- "the male sexual organ", likely from Romani kar
- chooch -- "friend", "buddy"
- 24-911 -- "Meet me in the Store 24 parking lot immediately"

Former Massachusetts State Auditor Joe DeNucci, a Nonantum native, told the Globe:

You talk the Lake language and only people from there can understand you. An awful lot of what it means is how you say it and how you use it. You improvise a lot, mixing it with carnival talk and bebop.

"Mush is the earie." That means "The guy is listening."

Lake talk is not confined to the neighborhood. Nonantum students have spread it to Newton North High School, which serves the area.

== Notable people ==
- Marianne Leone Cooper, actress
- A. Joseph DeNucci, politician and former professional boxer
- Matt LeBlanc, actor

== See also ==
- Bemis Mill
- Adams Street Shul
