= Foreign Business Act, B.E. 2542 =

The Foreign Business Act was a law enacted by the Chuan Leekpai-controlled National Legislative Assembly of Thailand in 1999 that limited foreign ownership of certain Thai industries. Its predecessor was the Alien Business Act of 1972, enacted by a military junta. Industries which must be majority-owned by Thais included the newspaper business, radio stations, television stations, rice farming, animal husbandry, fishing, land trading, mining, wholesaling and retailing, restaurants, and all service businesses. The law criminalized nominees, any Thai who held shares on behalf of a foreigner. Nominees could be fined 100,000 to 1 million baht and face up to 3 years in prison. However, the law did not prohibit foreigners from being the majority in the board of directors and also did not prohibit having different classes of shares with differing voting rights. This loophole allowed thousands of foreign-controlled businesses to operate in Thailand.

== The new draft Foreign Business Act ==
The first draft was issued by the Thai Ministry of Commerce in December 2006. A second draft was done in March and the third and final draft was approved by the cabinet in April 2007. The main points of contention are :

- 1. The draft proposes to extend the definition of alien (foreign individuals or companies) as being that any company where foreigners hold half or a majority of the voting rights would be classified as alien and thereby restricted from participation in businesses regulated under the Foreign Business Act.
- 2. limited grandfathering is included. All foreign owned companies as under the new definition and that have been operating for a year have to apply to the Ministry of Commerce for a certificate with a year. Once the certificate has been issued they have to adjust their shareholding or voting profile to conform to the new definition of the act within 3 years. This would exclude most service businesses.
- 3. 100% foreign ownership was allowed for retail and wholesale businesses under the Foreign Business Act with the condition that 100 million Baht capital was fully paid or 20 million Baht per shop. That has now been abolished under the new Foreign Business Act.

== Objections of the foreign business community ==
The foreign business community have objected to the draft on the following bases.

- 1. Thailand as a WTO member had equal national treatment of businesses of all WTO member countries, provided foreign equity investment was limited to 49%. The draft Foreign Business Act eliminates those rights.
- 2. Foreign companies in Thailand had for years structured their companies into different classes of shares with differential voting rights. These had been accepted by the Ministry of Commerce for years. The new Foreign Business Act will make those structures illegal.
- 3. All other countries such as Malaysia, Vietnam, China and India are opening their markets to foreign investment yet the draft Foreign Business Act by narrowing the definition of alien closes the Thai market and makes Thailand look as if it has a protectionist strategy.

== Exceptions in Foreign Business Act for Foreigners ==
A foreigner can engage in business activities that are:

1. not listed under List One, List Two or List Three except for certain business i.e. manufacturing and exporting activities.
2. specifically described in the FBA as exempt from a foreign business licence requirement;
3. promoted under the Investment Promotion Act B.E. 2520 (1977) or granted written permission for the operation of the business under the Industrial Estate Authority of Thailand Act, B.E.2522 (1979).
4. by virtue of a treaty to which Thailand becomes a promoter of the business.

Foreigners must notify the Director-General of the DBD in order to obtain a foreign business certificate.

Thailand is currently bound by several agreements such as the U.S. – Thai Treaty of Amity and Economic Relations of 1833 (the “US-Thai Treaty of Amity”), Thailand – Australia Free Trade Agreement (TAFTA), Japan – Thailand Economic Partnership Agreement (JTEPA), ASEAN Framework Agreement on Services (AFAS), and ASEAN Comprehensive Investment Agreement (ACIA). Only the US-Thai Treaty of Amity allows U.S. nationals and/or companies to hold majority or whole of the shares in companies to engage in business on the same basis as Thai companies but with certain requirements, i.e.:

- A minimum of 51% of shares must be of the citizens of the United States;
- At least half of the directors must be citizens of the United States.

The Treaty of Amity between the United States and Thailand, however, prevents US nationals/entities from engaging in the following restricted activities:

- Communication;
- Transportation;
- Fiduciary responsibilities
- Banking services that include depository functions;
- Property ownership;
- Land or other natural resource exploitation; and
- Domestic trade in indigenous agricultural products.

FBA issues regulations from time to time. It is to exclude certain foreigners’ service business activities, as detailed in Ministerial Regulations.

== See also ==
- U.S.-Thai Treaty of Amity
