= Jens Westengard =

American lawyer (1871–1918)

Jens I. Westengard
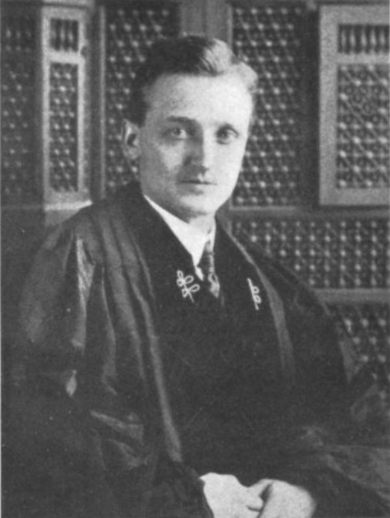
- Born: September 15, 1871; Chicago, Illinois
- Died: September 17, 1918 (aged 47); Cambridge, Massachusetts
- Spouse: Rebecca A. Prosser (m. 1898)

Signature
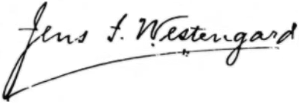

Jens Iverson Westengard (September 15, 1871 – September 17, 1918) was an American legal scholar and diplomat. He was a faculty member at Harvard Law School, first assistant professor (1899–1903), later Bemis Professor of International Law (1915–1918). Between 1903 and 1915, Westengard served as a General Advisor in Foreign Affairs to the Government of Siam.

== Early life and education ==
Westengard was born in Chicago, the son of Abel August and Nielsigne Dorthea (Iverson) Westengard. His father emigrated from Denmark to the United States in 1863. He attended Chicago public schools and found work as a stenographer. Saving his money to fulfill an ambition to practice law, he paid the tuition to enter Harvard Law School in the fall of 1895. Earning the LL.B.degree in 1898, he graduated second in his class of 129; he entered the Massachusetts bar in the same year. He taught on the faculty of Harvard Law School until 1903.

== General Advisor to Siamese government ==
In 1903 Westengard left Harvard to become Assistant General Advisor to the government of Siam (present-day Thailand). He worked under his mentor and close Harvard Law School associate Edward H. Strobel. While still also practicing law in Boston, Westengard was made acting General Advisor to the Siamese government, 1905-1907 and 1908-1909. From 1909 to 1915, he served as General Advisor with the rank of Minister Plenipotentiary. From 1915 until his death, he held the Bemis professorship of International Law at Harvard Law School.

Westengard's most notable career achievements were in his work for the Siamese government. In that country he played an important role in negotiating settlements in boundary disputes with British Burma and the French colony of Vietnam. He was effective in helping to develop a native government, a state administrative system and a criminal code. Perhaps most important among his achievements in Siam was his effort to abolish extraterritoriality in Siamese courts, i.e., the system whereby native courts could not assert jurisdiction over European or American subjects, as they were entitled to have any civil or criminal suits they were involved in tried in consular courts. He also was appointed judge of the Supreme Court of Appeals of Siam in 1911. Through all this, Westengard, and Strobel before him, enjoyed the confidence and support of King Chulalongkorn. As General Advisor, Westengard was enormously influential in effecting a wide variety of reforms and civil improvements on behalf of the government; among these, in addition to those already mentioned, were negotiating foreign loans, drafting legislation and modifying existing laws, planning water works, restructuring the kingdom's finances and system of revenue, negotiated foreign treaties, and proposed ambassadors and ministers. For the coronation of King Rama VI in 1910, Westengard brought together the largest gathering of European royalty in Asia then known.

After twelve years in Siam, Westengard resigned from his service to the government in June 1915 and returned to Harvard to take up teaching law again.

== Memberships and honors ==
Westerngard was a member of the American Society of International Law, the American Bar Association, Massachusetts State Bar Association, Suffolk County Bar Association, Cambridge Historical Society, Cambridge Club, the Travellers and Harvard Clubs of Boston, and various Asian societies. Harvard University awarded him an honorary A.M. degree in 1903. The kingdom of Siam bestowed on him the title Phya Kalyana Maitri. From the Siamese government, he received the Grand Cordon of the Order of the White Elephant, Grand Cross of the Crown of Siam, special second class Order of Chula Chom Klao and second class Order of Ratanaphorn. The French government made him an officer of the Legion of Honor. Denmark awarded him the Grand Cross of the Order of the Danneborg.

Considering the differences between teaching law and his work in diplomacy, Westengard could rightly boast that the latter afforded him considerably more honors, as he once wrote in a letter:

I remember well that I dined one night with [Harvard University] President Eliot, when, pointing out the happiness of the law teacher's lot, he said that the practicing lawyer was a man "whose name was writ in water." No man should boast till he has safely finished his task; but, come what may, in Siam my name is writ more substantially on the land than that.

== Personal affairs ==
Westengard married Rebecca Aubrey Prosser on July 16, 1898 in London, England. They had one son, Jens Aubrey Westengard (b. 1900). Shortly after he was informed that the Siamese government wished him to be their representative at the Paris Peace Conference after World War I, Westengard died in Cambridge, Mass., on September 17, 1918, after a brief illness.

== See also ==
- Westengard, Jens Iverson. Papers, 1885-1945: Finding Aid. Harvard Law School Library, Harvard Library, Harvard University.

Academic offices
Previous: Edward H. Strobel	Bemis Professor of International Law (1915–1918)	Next: Manley O. Hudson
