= Edmund Roberts (diplomat) =

American diplomat (1784–1836)

His Excellency Edmund Roberts
- Born: June 29, 1784; Portsmouth, New Hampshire
- Died: June 12, 1836, age 51; Macau
- Occupation(s): Merchant; Envoy Extraordinary
- Known for: Siamese–American Treaty of Amity and Commerce; Omani treaty of 1834
- Notable work: Embassy to the Eastern Courts of Cochin-China, Siam, and Muscat in the U. S. Sloop-of-war Peacock, David Geisinger, Commander, During the Years 1832-3-4 at Project Gutenberg (posthumous)
- Spouse: Catherine Whipple Langdon
- Children: 11

Edmund Roberts (June 29, 1784 – June 12, 1836) was an American diplomat. Appointed by President Andrew Jackson, he served as the United States' first envoy to the Far East and went on USS Peacock on non-resident diplomatic missions to the courts of Cochinchina, Thailand ("Siam") and Muscat and Oman during 1832 to 1836.

Roberts concluded treaties with Thailand and Said bin Sultan, Sultan of Muscat and Oman, ratified in Washington, D.C. 30 June 1834. He returned in 1836 to exchange ratifications with Oman and Thailand and to the court of Minh Mạng in Vietnam for a second attempt at negotiation. He fell ill with dysentery and died in Portuguese Macau, which precluded his becoming America's first envoy to Edo Japan.

== Early life ==
Roberts was born 29 June 1784 to Sarah Griffiths of Portsmouth, New Hampshire, and Royal Navy Captain Edmund Roberts, who died 15 November 1787 and was interred in North Cemetery. New Hampshire (with only 16 miles (26 km) of coastline) and the Portsmouth Naval Shipyard in Maine are credited with shaping Roberts' character. At age 13 he received through his congressman a Midshipman's warrant in the United States Navy but waived the appointment at his mother's wish for him to remain at home while she lived.

Roberts set out to sea in 1800, eventually residing in London until age 24. Returning in 1808, he married Miss Catherine Whipple Langdon, daughter of Judge Woodbury Langdon and niece of Governor John Langdon, both of whom were engaged in the New England triangular trade between Portsmouth, the Caribbean and London. Of the couple's 11 children, 8 survived their parents.

== Career ==
=== Shipping ===
Roberts entered the New England triangular trade as shipowner and his own supercargo but never as a captain. Robert Hopkins Miller says Roberts lost his accumulated wealth in a series of misfortunes, but he succeeded in 1823 in being appointed US consul at Demerara. However, Miller erroneously places Demerara on the east coast of Africa and does not mention the Demerara rebellion of 1823. "The 1823 revolt had a special significance...[in that i]t attracted attention in Britain inside and outside Parliament to the terrible evil slavery and the need to abolish it." Roberts' own account mentions neither Demerara nor the slave revolt but his palpable aversion to slavery colors his negotiating stance, where subjects act as slaves to the king.

By 1827, nearly impoverished by depredations of French and Spanish privateers on his ships in the West Indies, he chartered Mary Ann to trade in the Indian Ocean. Roberts arrived in the port of Zanzibar in October 1827 and the next year had an audience with the newly arrived Said bin Sultan, Sultan of Muscat and Oman, who was so anxious to counterbalance British influence that he asked Roberts to escort some vessels to the United States to petition for trade. Roberts promised to bring the matter up with his government. Upon returning, he wrote U.S. Senator Levi Woodbury, a personal friend, of the aggravations endured by American shipping, that might be alleviated by negotiating commercial treaties.

=== Diplomatic endeavors ===
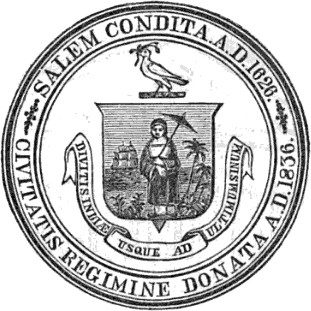
Latin: Divitis Indiae usque ad ultimum sinum

The stage was set for Roberts diplomatic career by Salem's trade with China and the East Indies. Pursuits of members of the East India Marine Society, established in 1799 and composed of those who had sailed beyond the Cape of Good Hope or Cape Horn as masters or supercargoes contributed to the beginnings of US international relations during the period of 1788 to 1845. From 1826 to 1832, John Shillaber, American consul in Batavia, sent a series of letters suggesting that he be empowered to negotiate trade treaties. Martin Van Buren replied in a letter dated 13 December 1830, sent over the signature of clerk Daniel Brent, requesting a more precise knowledge of the nature and character of the governments in question, and more details on difficulties encountered. Matters came to a head after Charles Moses Endicott, master of the merchantman Friendship of Salem, engaged in the spice trade on the Sumatran coast, returned to report the brig Governor Endicott, also of Salem, and James Monroe of New York, had recaptured his ship from pirates who had plundered her, murdering several crewmen. In the wake of public outcry, President Andrew Jackson ordered Commodore John Downes of the frigate Potomac, which had been preparing to sail for the west coast, to proceed instead on the first Sumatran expedition, departing New York harbor on 19 August 1831.

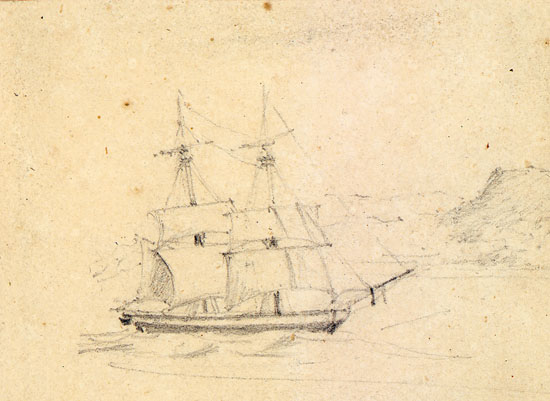
Peacock. Alfred T. Agate. Pencil.

Woodbury, who as senator had been pressing for increased naval appropriations when he received Robert's letter on the need for trade negotiations, had just become Jackson's Secretary of the Navy and saw an opportunity. As Potomac was departing the schooner Boxer was nearing commissioning; Peacock, outfitted for exploration, but due to lack of funds diverted to duty in the West Indies, had returned for re-fit. Woodbury convinced Jackson to send both 10-gun ships to support Potomac, with Roberts as Jackson's "special agent". Secretary of State Edward Livingston's "Instructions to Special Agent Edmund Roberts" signed 27 January 1832, ordering him to embark upon Peacock in the guise of the captain's clerk, his mission's purpose concealed except from the captain and those with a need to know; while in passage he was to gather as much as possible of the knowledge previously requested of Shillaber; his duties as envoy would then begin at Cochin-China. Livingston added a postscript that Roberts is to receive $6 per diem. Jackson later explained to the Senate in his message of 30 May 1834, "The expenses of the agency have been defrayed out of the contingent fund for foreign intercourse".

In mid-February 1832, Boxer was dispatched to Liberia with orders to join Peacock off the coast of Brazil, but the ships failed to rendezvous until 5 June 1834 in the unhealthy roadstead of Batavia. In March 1832, Peacock sailed for Brazil under Commander David Geisinger, with Francis Baylies appointed chargé d'affaires to Buenos Aires and secret agent Roberts. His published account follows the general outline of that published two years previously of East India Company agent John Crawfurd's 1822 mission to Siam and Cochinchina. Roberts, in both his report to State and in his journal, cites page 269 of his copy of Mr. Crawford [sic] – page 414 in Crawfurd's second edition.

Boxer having failed to show by the time appointed, orders were left at Montevideo for her to join up at Bencoolen. Peacock sailed by way of the Cape Horn and made Bencoolen on 23 August 1833; the Dutch Resident reported Potomac had completed her mission, thus freeing Peacock to continue Roberts' quest for intelligence.

== First mission ==
Pursuant to orders to gather information before going to Cochinchina, Peacock sailed for Manila by way of Long Island and Crokatoa. Peacock's marine chronometers proving useless, she threaded the Sunda Strait by dead reckoning. Diarrhea and dysentery were prevalent among the crew from Angier to Manila. After a fortnight there, cholera struck, despite the overall cleanliness of the ship. Peacock lost seven men; many who recovered died of other diseases. No new case of cholera occurred after she got under way 2 November 1833 for Macau. Within two leagues (9.7 km) of Lamma Island or Wanshan Archipelago, she took aboard a maritime pilot after settling on a fee of thirteen dollars and a bottle of rum.

=== Macao and Canton City ===
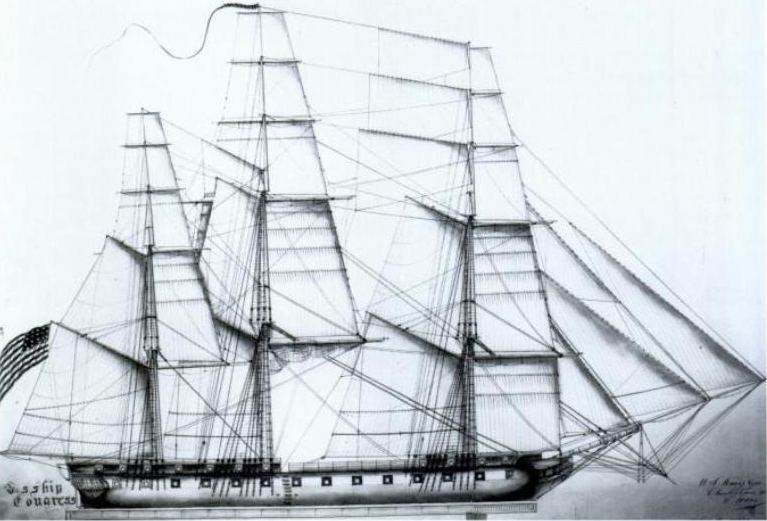
Congress

Americans arriving at the port of Canton City were treated much the same as other foreigners willing to conduct trade through the co-hong, Chinese mercantile houses granted imperial monopolies in foreign commerce. The trade was lucrative, but foreign traders were social and political inferiors, with no guarantees for their lives, property, or rights of trade or residence. While this rankled the English, Americans and others were unwilling to meddle, lest that bring about what they feared most — a trade embargo.

Congress under Captain John D. Henley, the first US naval vessel to call on China, arrived on 3 November 1819 at Lintin Island. Chinese officials, alarmed at the arrival of a warship, commanded her captain not to enter the Pearl River. Advised by the U.S. consul that no adverse action would be taken, Captain Henley entered to re-provision his ship. In January 1830, the sloop-of-war Vincennes under Commander William B. Finch, on America's first global circumnavigation, remained over a fortnight at Canton, where American merchants advised him that an annual naval visit would be valuable – if their commanders would show "the same deference toward the customs of China, and conciliatory disposition as exhibited by yourself", which Finch duly reported to the Navy department. There is no indication that Finch's report was forwarded to state, or that Roberts had seen it, even though conditions were practically the same in all nearby "Sinicized" tributary kingdoms, i.e., conduct oneself circumspectly, with no guarantees one way or the other.

In the latter months of 1832, Roberts visited Macao and Canton City, where he notes, "The Chinese merchants have a well-earned reputation as shrewd dealers : they have little confidence in each other; every contract of importance must be 'fixed,' and made sure by the payment of a stipulated sum : but they place the most unlimited confidence in the integrity of their foreign customers"(pg. 128) Roberts devoted most of Chapters VI to XVII to history, customs and governance of the "Celestial Kingdom", and leaves it to the reader to conclude why "Celestials" have little confidence in one another. He engages John Robert Morrison as Chinese translator and personal secretary, who was to return by way of Singapore.

=== Kingdom of Vietnam ===
See Minh Mạng's isolationist foreign policy

Six weeks after arriving at Linting, and after enduring several days of rainy and squally weather, Peacock sailed for the bay of Turan (Da Nang) as the best point to communicate with Huế, about 50 miles distant, it being impossible to anchor off the bar of Hue due to the East Asian monsoon. Arriving off the bay on 1 January 1833, contrary winds from the northwest rather than the expected northeast quarter, coupled with a strong southward current caused the ship to lose ground on every tack, until on January 6, she sailed into an unknown bay which proved to host Phú Yên Province's Vung-lam harbour.

A raggedly-dressed and dirty old man came on board there who appeared to be somewhat superior to the fishermen who brought him. Rather disconcerted at not being offered a seat, he expressed a desire to leave. Once it was learned that he was the principal person in the village, he was invited down to a seat on the gun-deck, where he was closely questioned as to just where the ship was and the extent of government and defenses. Being informed the ship bore an envoy anxious to reach the capital, the old man cheerfully said the ship might return northward to it in three or four days. This remark was forgotten at the time, and ruefully recalled after the mission failed to receive an official invitation to Hue. Roberts attributes subsequent misunderstandings to their national vanity and prejudices, and gives a detailed record of his own. Miller says a modern Vietnamese suggests Roberts seemed to lack "diplomatic flexibility," and his descriptions of the people are "denuded of all goodwill and understanding." Roberts died before publication of his account, without having had a chance to revise it. As published, he reports playing a joke on court deputies when pressed for his titles, which in the usage of the day, were usually quite long.

I at once concluded to humour them.... The principal deputy having prepared his Chinese pencil and half a sheet of paper, sat down to write. I immediately observed to him, that it was necessary to commence with a whole sheet.... Having determined to give them, in the first place, the names of all the counties, and the two hundred and odd towns in my native state, as well as the mountains, rivers, and lakes, which would supply the places of titles, and then, if they were not satisfied, to proceed in the same manner with all the other states in the Union... &c., would probably occupy them for some days, if they had had sufficient perseverance to proceed to the end of what I intended should be endless. I then commenced as follows, Mr. Morrison acting as interpreter and frequently translator: Edmund Roberts, a special envoy from the United States, and a citizen of Portsmouth, in the state of New Hampshire. I then proceeded with the counties of Rockingham, Strafford, Merrimack....

Roberts' interest in becoming a diplomat was sparked by an earlier visit around 1827 to Said bin Sultan, Sultan of Muscat and Oman. A treaty with the Sultan was signed at Muscat on September 21, 1833.

== Later life ==
A bill for the settlement of the accounts of Edmund Roberts, late diplomatic agent of the United States to Cochin China, Muscat, and Siam, proposed that his legal representatives be authorized to draw the salary of a chargé d'affaires, without the outfit, less the per diem already paid, from the time of his appointment January 27, 1832, until six months after his death June 13, 1836. Roberts' account of his mission was published posthumously; his papers were placed on deposit by the Portsmouth Historical Society in July 1991. His mission was commemorated in a historical perspective on gifts to the United States of America at the Smithsonian Institution's National Museum of Natural History. Roberts is also known for having requested issues of 1804-dated American Turban Head eagles and the Draped Bust dollars (the 1804 dollar) as parts of presentation proof coinage to be carried on his second mission. Neither Roberts' nor Ruschenberger's accounts are those of a polished diplomat, but were written "for a general American audience to acquaint them with the realities of a far-off land and culture" – subsequently collected and republished as Two Yankee Diplomats In 1830s Siam.

== See also ==
- Oman–United States relations
- Townsend Harris § Harris Treaty of 1856 with Siam
- Treaty of Amity and Economic Relations (Thailand–United States) of 1966
