= Adams Street Shul =

Modern Orthodox synagogue in Newton, Massachusetts

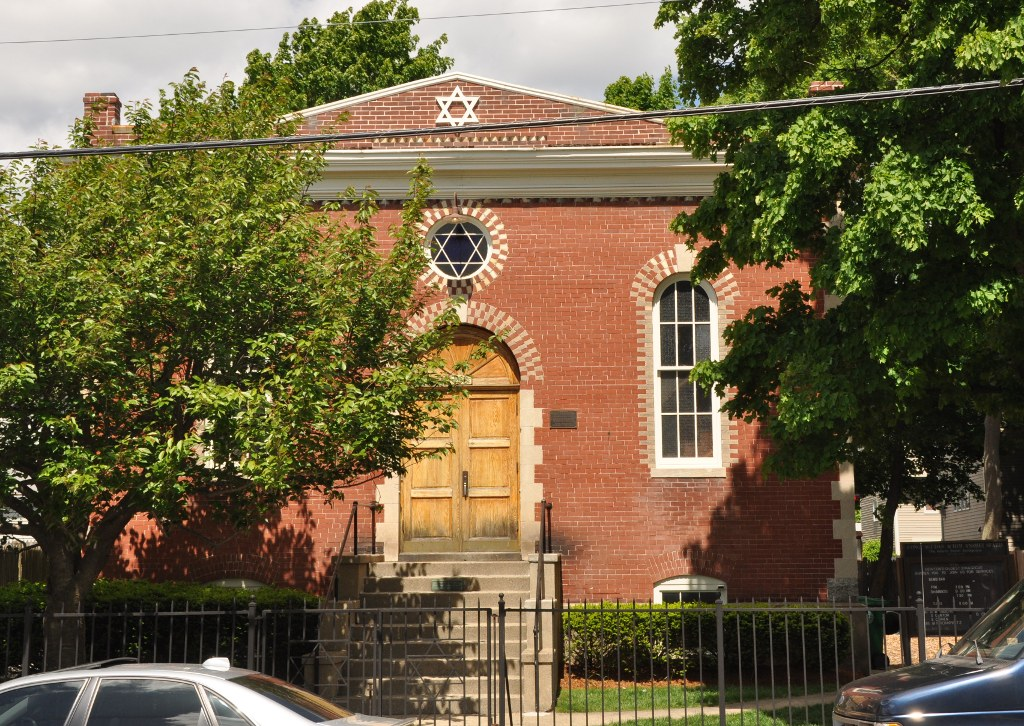
- The Adams Street Shul

- Location in Massachusetts

Religion
- Affiliation: Modern Orthodox Judaism
- Rite: Nusach Sefard
- Ecclesiastical or organizational status: Synagogue
- Leadership: (Currently Vacant)
- Status: Active

Location
- Location: 168 Adams Street, Village of Nonantum, Newton, Massachusetts 02458
- Country: United States
- Interactive map of Adams Street Shul
- Coordinates: 42°21′33″N 71°12′03″W

Architecture
- Style: Romanesque Revival
- Established: 1911 (as a congregation)
- Completed: 1912
- Materials: Brick

Website
- adamsstreet.org
- Agudas Achim Anshei Sfard Synagogue
- U.S. National Register of Historic Places
- Area: less than one acre
- NRHP reference No.: 90000035
- Added to NRHP: March 14, 1990

The Adams Street Shul, officially the Congregation Agudas Achim Anshei Sfard, is a Modern Orthodox Jewish synagogue located at 168 Adams Street in the village of Nonantum in Newton, Massachusetts, in the United States. Built in 1912 for a congregation established in 1911, it is home to Newton's oldest Jewish congregation, one of the oldest in the region, still occupying its original synagogue building.

Its Romanesque Revival-style building was listed on the National Register of Historic Places on March 16, 1990.

== Architecture and history ==
The Adams Street Shul is located on the north side of Adams Street, a short way southeast of Watertown Street (Massachusetts Route 16), the main road through Nonantum Village. It is a single-story brick structure, three bays wide, with a pair of round-arch windows flanking the main entrance, which is also set in a round-arch opening. Above the entrance is an oculus window with a Star of David.

The synagogue was built in 1912 by a Jewish congregation established in 1911. It was Newton's only synagogue until 1937, when Temple Emanuel was completed on Ward Street. It was built with a significant contribution of labor by the congregation, which included skilled craftsmen. The Torah ark and bema were added in 1924, the work of a Jewish-Ukrainian craftsman, who also created the Vilna Shul ark. The interior has seen only modest alterations since its construction. The congregation has remained small but steady, with many families having multiple generations of membership. The current benches in the synagogue were donated by Congregation Kehillath Israel in Brookline when they renovated their sanctuary.

== See also ==
- National Register of Historic Places listings in Newton, Massachusetts
