= Harold Medberry Bemis =

United States Navy admiral

- Born: July 15, 1884; Oshkosh, Wisconsin, U.S.
- Died: February 16, 1970 (aged 85); Washington, D.C., U.S.
- Burial place: Arlington National Cemetery
- Spouse: Hazel Haynes (m. 1926)
- Military career
- Branch: United States Navy
- Rank: Rear Admiral

Harold Medberry Bemis (July 15, 1884 – February 16, 1970) was a rear admiral in the United States Navy.

== Early life ==
Bemis was born July 15, 1884, in Oshkosh, Wisconsin.

== Personal life ==
He married Hazel Haynes on November 20, 1926.

== Military career ==
Bemis graduated from the United States Naval Academy in 1906. He served on the USS Maine. He would serve in World War I as the Commander of Submarine Division Five. He graduated from the Naval War College in 1934. From 1938 to 1939, he served as a naval attache. Later, he served in World War II. His retirement was effective as of August 1, 1946.

== Civilian career ==
From 1947-1953, he served as President-Chairman of the Board, Compania Anonima Venezolana Lummus in Caracas, Venezuela.

== Awards ==
He received the Navy Distinguished Service Medal, the World War I Victory Medal, the World War II Victory Medal, the American Defense Service Medal, and the American Campaign Medal. He received the Order of Abdon Calderón medal from Ecuador.

== Death and legacy ==
Bemis died on February 16, 1970, at his home in Washington, D.C., and is buried at Arlington National Cemetery.

Bemis' papers are held by United States Naval History & Heritage Command.
