= Edward Henry Strobel =

American diplomat (1855–1908)

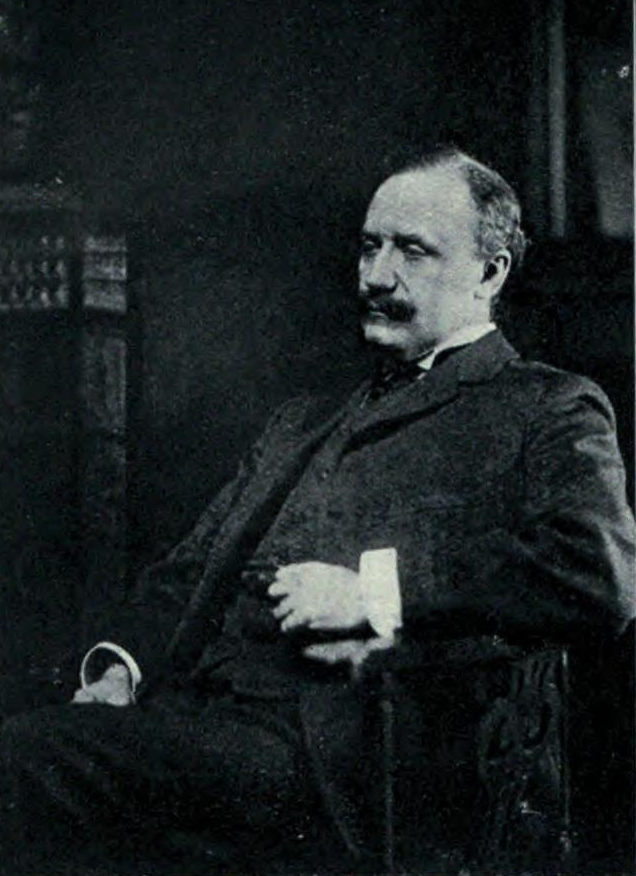
- E. H. Strobel, ca. 1908

Personal details
- Born: December 7, 1855 Charleston, South Carolina
- Died: January 15, 1908 (aged 52) Bangkok, Thailand

Edward Henry Strobel, also known as E.H. Strobel (December 7, 1855 – January 15, 1908) was a United States diplomat and a scholar in international law.

== Early life and education ==
Strobel was born in Charleston, South Carolina on December 7, 1855. He graduated from Harvard College in 1877 and Harvard Law School in 1882. He practiced law in New York from 1883 to 1885. He was admitted to the New York bar in 1883, and in 1885 he was appointed Secretary of the Legation of the United States to Spain, serving until 1890.

== Politics ==
Based on notes from his period in Madrid, Strobel wrote a book on the Spanish revolution in 1868. Strobel returned to become Third Assistant Secretary of State in Washington, D.C. during 1893–1894. He served as U.S. Minister to Ecuador in 1894, and to Chile from 1894 to 1897. He returned to Boston in 1898 to become the Bemis Professor of International Law.]

In 1903, Strobel took a leave of absence to represent the Kingdom of Siam at the International Peace Court in The Hague in 1903. In 1906 he moved to Bangkok to become the American Adviser in Foreign Affairs to the government King Chulalongkorn of Siam. Strobel played an important role in negotiating a treaty between France and Siam, which was signed on signed on March 23, 1907.

== Death ==
Edward Strobel died in Bangkok, Siam on January 15, 1908. He had suffered blood poisoning after a long illness that started with the bite of an insect in Egypt two years earlier. He was cremated in a ceremony on February 5 1908, at which King Chulalongkorn himself lighted the funeral pyre.

== Legacy ==
There is a memorial stone dedicated to Strobel in the churchyard of the Unitarian Church in his hometown Charleston, South Carolina.

== See also ==
- Gustave Rolin-Jaequemyns – Belgian predecessor and first modern foreign advisor
- Francis Bowes Sayre, Sr. – American successor

Government offices
| Preceded by William Morton Grinnell | Third Assistant Secretary of State; April 17, 1893 – April 16, 1894 | Succeeded by William Woodville Rockhill |
Academic offices
| Previous: inaugural | Bemis Professor of International Law (1897–1908) | Next: Jens I. Westengard |
