= Siamese–American Treaty of Amity and Commerce =

1836 treaty between Siam and the United States

American–Siamese Roberts Treaty of 1833
Treaty of Amity and Commerce between His Majesty the Magnificent King of Siam and the United States of America
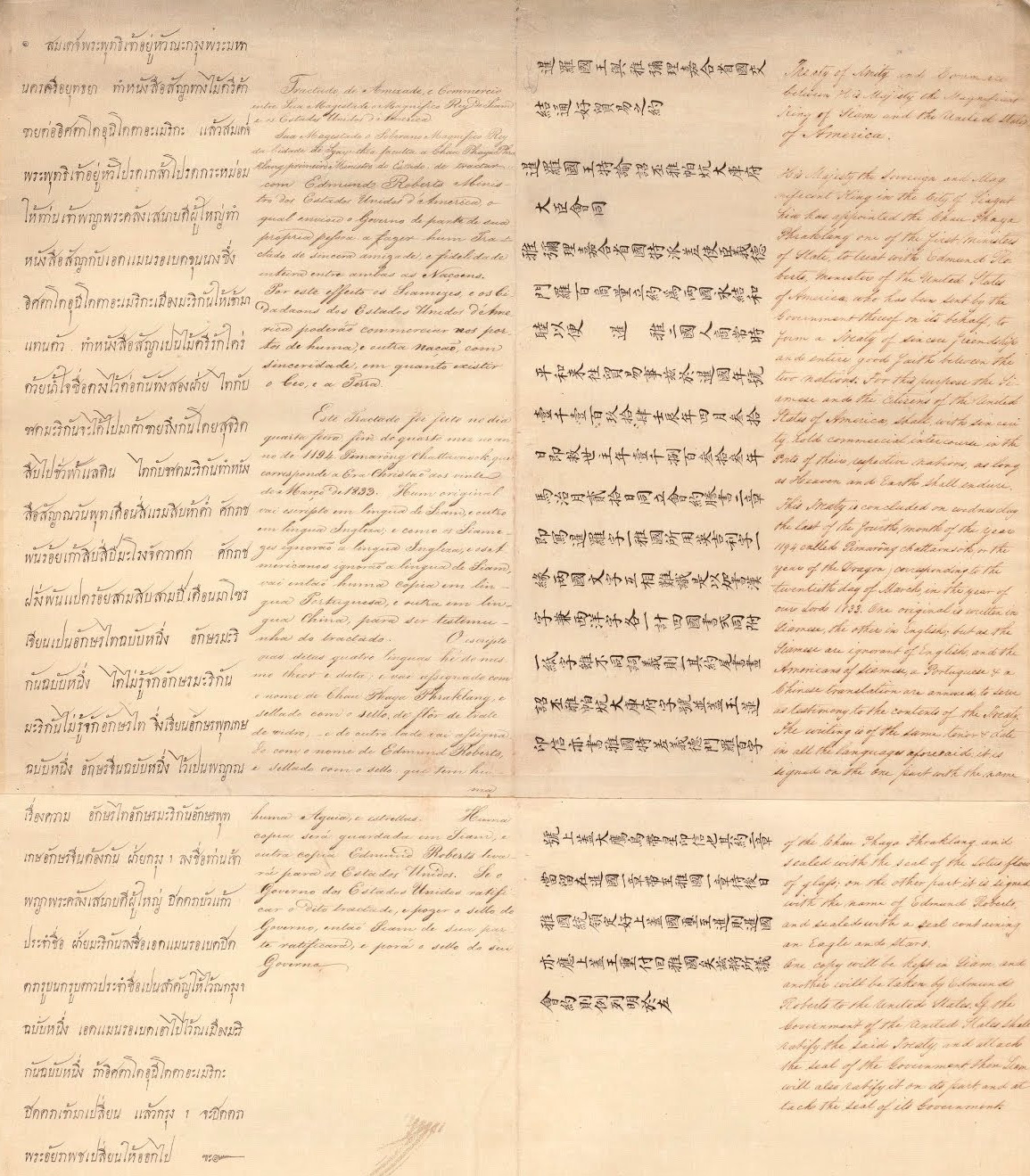
- Preamble part of the treaty paper in four languages; from left to right: Thai, Portuguese, Chinese and English
- Type: Treaty
- Signed: 20 March 1833
- Location: Mansion of Chaophraya Phrakhlang; Thonburi, Bangkok
- Ratified: 18 April 1836
- Expiration: Measurement duties and the Americans being subjected to Siamese laws: 15 June 1857 (21 years) American–Siamese Treaty of 1856; Other provisions: 1 September 1921 (85 years) American–Siamese Treaty of 1920
- Signatories: (Thailand) Chaophraya Phrakhlang Dit Bunnag (United States) Edmund Roberts
- Parties: (Thailand) Kingdom of Siam; United States
- Languages: English and Thai; Chinese and Portuguese annexed

Full text
- Treaty of Amity and Commerce between Siam and the United States, 1833 at Wikisource

Treaty of Amity and Commerce between His Majesty the Magnificent King of Siam and the United States of America (Thai: หนังสือสัญญาทางพระราชไมตรีประเทศอเมริกันแลประเทศสยามคฤษต์ศักราช๑๘๓๓, Portuguese: Tractado de Amizade, e Commercio entre Sua Magestade o Magnifico Rey de Siam e os Estados Unidos d’America, Chinese: 暹羅國王與雅彌理嘉合省國交結通好貿易之約) or the American–Siamese Roberts Treaty of 1833, was a treaty between Siam or Rattanakosin Kingdom under King Rama III and the United States during the presidency of Andrew Jackson. This treaty established relations between Siam and the United States, being the first treaty between the two countries and also the first treaty that the U.S. had with an Asian nation. Commercial stipulations of the treaty were modeled after the preceding Anglo–Siamese Burney Treaty of 1826.

By the early nineteenth century, American merchants had come to trade in the Far East. An American merchant Stephen Williams visited Bangkok in 1818, where he was received by the Siamese royal court. However, American merchants had been restricted by traditional Siamese royal monopoly, in which all Western trades were required to go through the Phra Khlang Sinkha or Royal Warehouse who controlled the prices and monopolized the trade, depriving Western merchants of any negotiating powers. British East India Company had already obtained free trade, in which the British merchants were allowed to trade freely in Siam without having to go through the Royal Warehouse, in the Anglo–Siamese Burney Treaty of 1826, in exchange for the British merchants paying the measurement duties, which was levied according to the breadth of the incoming merchant vessel.

Around 1828, Edmund Roberts, an American merchant, wrote that American trade in the Far East had been neglected due to the Americans not having secured trading rights and privileges from Asian nations in the same manner as other Western nations. President Andrew Jackson then appointed Edmund Roberts in January 1832 as the secret special agent to conclude commercial treaties with Oman, Siam and Vietnam. After his failure to procure a treaty from the Vietnamese Nguyen dynasty, Edmund Roberts the American envoy, with sloop-of-war USS Peacock, arrived in Bangkok in February 1833. King Rama III or King Nangklao of Siam assigned Chaophraya Phrakhlang Dit Bunnag the Siamese Minister of Trade and Foreign Affairs to negotiate with Roberts but language barrier was the most formidable obstacle. As no one in Siam knew English language by that time and Roberts did not know Thai language, the local Portuguese were called in as interpreters. After negotiation through interpreters at the house of Chaophraya Phrakhlang, the American–Siamese Treaty was signed on March 20, 1833. The treaty contained ten articles. The treaty provisions included;

- Establishment of perpetual peace between Siam and the United States.
- American merchants were granted free trade in Siam, being able to trade freely without having to go through the Phra Khlang Sinkha or Royal Warehouse.
- The American merchants were instead, in the same manner as the British, subjected to the measurement duties.
- Most Favored Nation status for trade duties; If Siam lowered duties for any other incoming Western nations, the American would be automatically accorded such reduction.
- The American merchants who came to trade in Siam were subjected to local Siamese laws and traditional judiciary.
- The United States would be permitted to establish consulate in Siam if Siam allowed any other Western nations than Portugal to have consulate.

The treaty terms were mostly similar to the Anglo–Siamese Burney Treaty of 1826. As the Siamese did not know English and the Americans did not know Thai, treaty versions of two intermediary languages, Chinese and Portuguese, were annexed. The treaty was then written in four languages; English, Thai, Chinese and Portuguese. Edmund Roberts brought this new American–Siamese Treaty back to the United States, where President Andrew Jackson approved the treaty in January 1835. The president then assigned Edmund Roberts to return to Siam to exchange ratifications of the treaty. Roberts arrived in Bangkok for the second time with USS Peacock and the ratifications were exchanged on April 18, 1836. However, Edmund Roberts soon died in June 1836 after his departure from Siam.

It turned out that this treaty was not satisfactory for both countries as the Siamese king reimposed monopoly through tax farming to compensate for revenue loss to the extent that no American merchants came to trade in Siam after 1838. The United States sent Joseph Balestier as the American envoy to Bangkok in 1850 to amend this Roberts Treaty but Balestier utterly failed. Moreover, the Americans in Siam were still subjected to the Siamese laws. The British were equally dissatisfied. With ascension of the new king Mongkut, who had been well-disposed towards Westerners, in 1851, the British managed to obtain the more favorable Bowring Treaty in April 1855, in which the measurement duties were abolished in favor of a low three-percent import duty for British merchants and the British were also allowed to establish consulate in Siam to oversee British subjects, who would be under British consular jurisdiction rather than local Siamese laws.

In September 1855, Townsend Harris, who had just been appointed by President Franklin Pierce as the U.S. Consul General to Japan, was assigned to conclude a new treaty with Siam on his journey to Japan. The American–Siamese Harris Treaty, a Bowring-type unequal treaty, was signed on May 29, 1856, which, in similar manner to the British Bowring Treaty, abolished the measurement duties stipulated in the 1833 Roberts Treaty in favor of the three-percent import duty, allowed the United States to establish a consulate and granted legal immunity to the Americans in Siam, who would be subjected to American consular authority rather than local laws. Other provisions of the Roberts Treaty of 1833 continued to take effect for the total of 85 years until being terminated as a whole by the American–Siamese Treaty of 1920.

== Negotiation, provisions, signing, and ratification ==
The treaty was negotiated by Edmund Roberts in his capacity as Minister of the United States on behalf of President Andrew Jackson, with the Chau Phaya-Phraklang in his capacity as Minister of State on behalf of His Majesty the Sovereign and Magnificent King in the City of Sia-Yut'hia (later known as Rama III.)

Roberts' first embassy arrived 18 February 1833 on the U.S. sloop-of-war Peacock, and was presented to Rama III on 18 March.

Peacock returned on the second embassy, along with Dr. W. S. W. Ruschenberger, for exchange of ratifications 14 April 1836.

The treaty exists in two original language versions, in Thai and English, with translations in Portuguese and Chinese. Portuguese and Chinese were apparently relied upon as languages understood by both parties' negotiators, because, as the preamble states, "the Siamese are ignorant of English, and the Americans of Siamese."

Its physical form is a scroll, about 90 inches (2.3 meters) long, with the four different language versions running next to one another for that entire length.

The treaty's preamble provides for commercial intercourse between the parties "as long as Heaven and Earth shall endure". Article I establishes "perpetual peace" between the parties; Article II stipulates free trade with few limitations; Article III, a measurement duty in lieu of import and export duties, tonnage, licence to trade, or any other charge whatever; Article IV (and X,) for most favored nation status; and Article V, relief for U.S. citizens in cases of shipwreck. Article VI introduces early U.S. concepts of bankruptcy protection. Article VIII provides that U.S. citizens taken by pirates and brought within the kingdom, be set at liberty and their property restored.

The treaty potentially granted the Americans much better terms than the British had obtained in their treaty of 1826. Though treaty provisions are not as generous as those of the British Bowring Treaty, the "most favored nation clauses" eased negotiation of the Harris modification to the treaty concluded about two decades later.

It was concluded on (as its preamble says) "Wednesday, the last of the fourth month of the year 1194, called Pi-marong-chat-tavasok, or the year of the Dragon, corresponding to "March 20, 1833, at the Royal City of Sia-Yut'hia, (commonly called Bangkok), pending final Ratification of the President of the United States of America, by and with the advice and consent of the Senate. Ratification was advised and ratified 30 June 1834, exchanged 14 April 1836 (bringing the treaty into force), and proclaimed 24 June 1837.

After the reign of King Rama V, the sensitive position of advisor on foreign affairs would be given to Americans and not to either English or French nationals.

== Heads of State and Signatories ==
	Kingdom of Siam	United States
Heads of State	His Majesty the Sovereign and Magnificent King in the City of Siayuthia (King Rama III of Siam)	President of the United States of America (Andrew Jackson)
Signatories	Chau-Phaya Phraklang one of the first Ministers of State (Chaophraya Phrakhlang Dit Bunnag)	Edmund Roberts, Minister of the United States of America

== Subsequent history ==
The terms were modified by the Harris Treaty of 1856.

It was further modified by an agreement in the form of exchange of notes of December 17 and 31, 1867, entered into force January 1, 1868.

This 1833 treaty was replaced in 1921 by a Treaty between the United States and the Kingdom of Siam, signed at Washington December 16, 1920 and entered into force September 1, 1921.

That treaty signed in 1920 was replaced in 1938 by the Treaty of Friendship, Commerce and Navigation between the United States and Siam, signed at Bangkok November 13, 1937 and entered into force October 1, 1938.

That treaty signed in 1937 was replaced in 1968 by the Treaty of Amity and Economic Relations, signed at Bangkok May 29, 1966 and entered into force in 1968, which remains in force today.

== See also ==
- Edward Henry Strobel – "American Adviser in Foreign Affairs"
- Francis Bowes Sayre, Sr. − foreign affairs adviser
- American–Siamese Treaty of 1856
- Treaty of Amity and Economic Relations (Thailand–United States) of 1966
- Thailand–United States relations
