= Seth Bemis =

American businessman

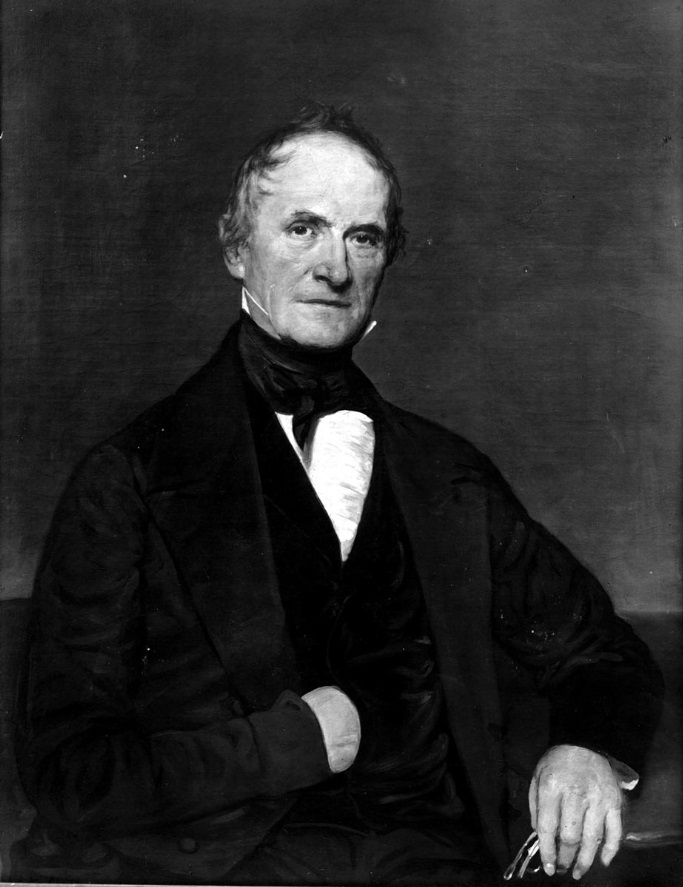
Seth Bemis by Francis Alexander

Seth Bemis (January 23, 1775 – April 4, 1851) was an American entrepreneur, active along the Charles River in the early Industrial Revolution. It is claimed that he was the first to manufacture cotton duck cloth. He was also father to attorney George Bemis.

Bemis was one of the three sons of David Bemis, builder of the Bemis Dam in 1778, which powered the first paper mill on the Charles River. When the elder Bemis died in 1790, his estate – including snuff and gristmills in Watertown, as well as a paper mill on the Newton side of the river – was divided among his three sons. Seth Bemis was then studying for admission to Harvard College, from which he graduated in 1795. After graduation, he briefly worked as a lawyer, then entered the employment of his sole surviving brother Luke, and shortly after becoming 21 purchased a half-interest in the Watertown mills as his brother's partner. On July 15, 1798, he bought out his brother, the partnership was dissolved, and Bemis became sole proprietor of the Watertown mills. For the next few years he experimented with the production of chocolate (which manufacture eventually went to the Walter Baker & Company of Dorchester), and the grinding of grain, dye goods, and medicinal roots.

In 1803 he built a cotton factory as an addition to his mill, and placed within it machinery for carding and spinning cotton and for making cotton warps. To clean the cotton, he invented his own machinery, which he called "the devil"; it was very similar to Eli Whitney's cotton gin, which had not been properly patented. His textile fabrics, particularly his popular "Bemis warp", were consigned for some years to Isaac Bowers' dry goods store in Boston. On February 28, 1806, Bemis petitioned the Massachusetts legislature for tax relief as follows: "The subscriber has at a very considerable expense lately erected a cotton mill in Watertown and wishes for some encouragement in his undertaking that may in part counterbalance the many inconveniences and losses which so frequently accompany enterprises which are but experiments. The subscriber flatters himself as the business has become very extensive in a neighboring State and as large quantities of cotton yarn are now being sent to our markets for sale that the General Court will In their wisdom see fit to place him on an equal standing with other manufacturers of this article in this State and exempt his cotton mill from taxes for seven years". His petition was granted in 1807 for a period of five years, and that same year Bemis put into operation a number of hand looms and began to manufacture sheeting, shirting, satinet, and bed ticking.

In 1809 he decided manufacture of a new type of fabric from cotton yarns, namely "cotton duck" or sail cloth. Before this time, sail cloth had been made only from linen or flax yarn. The first sails were made from Bemis' cotton duck in Boston in November 1809, and his duck was used extensively during the War of 1812. It furnished the sails for the USS Constitution (old Ironsides) when it was being repaired. For a time, the cotton duck business was so profitable that Bemis not only enlarged his mills at Watertown but contracted for the labor of convicts in the Charlestown State Prison, where he set up a large number of looms. The manufacture of duck was discontinued in 1816.

Sometime before 1810, Bemis introduced machinery for grinding and cutting glass and for polishing lights for lighthouses, as well as for insertion in the decks of vessels and binnacle lights, under a patent granted in 1809 to Captain Winslow Lewis (who was also his selling agent for cotton duck).

In the fall of 1812, Bemis and an "English expert" built a gas house at the east end of the old Watertown mill, and began extracting gas from coal and using it to illuminate his factory. However, because the gas went through tin pipes, which it corroded, the "unsavory material" (gas) leaked and was odorous, non-economical, and dangerous. Its use was discontinued after two years.

In 1821 Bemis purchased from his brother Luke and Caleb Eddy the Bemis Mill on the Newton side of the Charles River, and thus became sole owner of the whole water power. Soon after, he built the rolling stone-dam, unique in the United States (the only other known example is near Warwick Castle in England). Precisely how it worked is not clear, but it seems that the height of the dam was controlled by a mechanically-operated drum that could be rolled up and down the inclined face of the stone dam. Soon after the dam was installed, his upstream neighbor, the Boston Manufacturing Company in Waltham, complained that the river was backing up to its waterwheels and impeding their operation. The company subsequently paid Bemis $12,000 to reduce the height of the dam by a foot.

Bemis continued to operate the mills on both sides of the river until 1848, sometimes alone, sometimes with others, notably his brother Luke. His son, Seth Jr., was largely responsible for the success of the dye works, and took over the management of all the mills on both sides of the river when Bemis died.
