= Bemis Mill =

- U.S. National Register of Historic Places
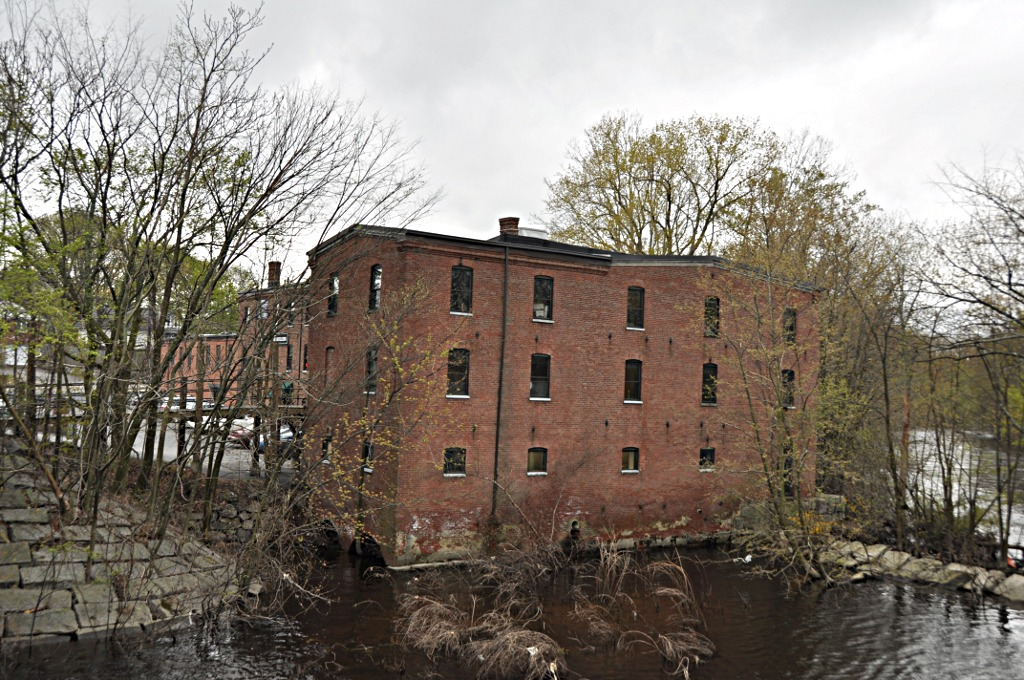

- Location within Massachusetts Location within the United States
- Location: Newton, Massachusetts
- Coordinates: 42°21′55″N 71°12′20″W
- Built: 1845
- MPS: Newton MRA
- NRHP reference No.: 86001773
- Added to NRHP: September 4, 1986

The Bemis Mill is a historic former industrial building at 1-3 Bridge Street, in the village of Nonantum, in Newton, Massachusetts. It is now a general office building called the Meredith Building. The building is significant historically as a surviving early industrial building in the city and for the remnants of unique power distribution and water control facilities that survive. On September 4, 1986, it was added to the National Register of Historic Places.

== Description and history ==
The Bemis Mill is located on the west side of Bridge Street, abutting the Charles River to the north. It is a three-story building, built out of handmade bricks laid in common bond. The building is roughly L-shaped, with the base of the L facing the river. The portion extending away from the river is an addition to the original building and was built sometime before 1875. The river-facing facade has a foundation of large granite blocks, with two arched openings providing access for the water that originally powered the mill. The millrace is no longer extant, and only fragments of the dam remain.

The site of the Bemis Mill has an industrial history dating to the 18th century. A dam was built across the river no later than 1778, and David Bemis built a paper mill on this site the following year, likely on the site of an even older mill. Bemis also built mills across the river in Watertown, that eventually became a successful textile factory. The paper mill failed in 1821 and was converted to textile manufacturing. In 1822, the proprietors of the Boston Manufacturing Company, located up the river in Waltham, offered Seth Bemis $1,000 per inch to lower their dam, whose impoundment was backed up the river to theirs. At this time, a poorly-understood "rolling dam" technology was added to regulate flow over the dam, and a new building may have been built. Elements of this system, which is only known to have been introduced in a few places, are still in place in the building's basement. (It is also possible the term refers to a reverse curve on the spillway.)

The Bemises used the mill until the 1840s as a dye-production facility. William Freeman purchased this mill in 1847, and those across the river in Watertown were bought by his son; both became principals in the Aetna Manufacturing Company, which continued to produce dyes here until 1870. At that time, the facility was converted to one that provided power to mills across the river, transmitted by means of a belt that passed through a slot in the river-facing facade and crossed the river. Textile operations wound down about 1920, after which this building was used for a time in the manufacture of automobile fabrics before its conversion to office space.

== See also ==
- National Register of Historic Places listings in Newton, Massachusetts
