= Treaty of Amity and Economic Relations (Thailand–United States) =

1966 treaty between Thailand and the United States

The Treaty of Amity and Economic Relations Between the Kingdom of Thailand and the United States of America is a treaty signed at Bangkok on 29 May 1966. The treaty allows for American citizens and businesses incorporated in the US, or in Thailand to maintain a majority shareholding or to wholly own a company in Thailand, and thereby engage in business on the same basis as would a Thai national. These companies are also exempt from most of the restrictions on foreign investment imposed by the Thai Foreign Business Act of 1999. The treaty in effect allows for an equality of benefits between the countries. American companies that wish to be covered by the treaty should have a minimum of 50 percent American directors and a minimum of 51 percent of shares must be held by American citizens.

Under the treaty, Thailand restricts American investment from the following fields of business:

1. Communications
2. Transportation
3. Fiduciary functions
4. Banking involving depository functions
5. Exploitation of land and natural resources
6. Owning land; and
7. Domestic trade in agricultural products.

The treaty also allows for preferential treatment for Thai businessmen applying for visas to conduct business in the United States. The formalities for their applications are kept to a minimum. Under the treaty the US Congress may not enact discriminating laws against Thai firms. Their profits may be freely remitted to Thailand and their assets may not be expropriated.

== See also ==
- Thailand–United States relations
- American–Siamese Treaty of 1856
- Siamese-American Treaty of Amity and Commerce of 1833
