= George Bemis (lawyer) =

American lawyer and legal scholar

- George Bemis
- Born: October 18, 1816; Watertown, Massachusetts, United States
- Died: January 18, 1878 (aged 61); Nice, France
- Education: Harvard University
- Occupation: Lawyer

George Bemis (October 13, 1816 – January 5, 1878) was an American lawyer and legal scholar. He was involved with many unique cases and was an advocate of international law and the reform of the treatment of criminals.

== Early life and education ==
George was born at Watertown, Massachusetts, the youngest son of Seth and Sarah (Wheeler) Bemis. A conscientious and diligent student, at the age of 13, he passed the entrance exam to Harvard College in 1829. Instead of enrolling at such a young age, he continued with his studies for three more years. He matriculated into the sophomore class in 1832 and graduated in 1835. He continued his studies by enrolling in Harvard Law School. He completed his formal education in 1839 and was admitted into the Massachusetts Bar in July 1839.

== Career ==
Bemis was one of the most esteemed lawyers in Boston during the 1850s and developed a profitable law practice while being involved in many famous legal proceedings. Bemis was a crusader for reform of the penal code in Massachusetts, especially laws that allowed a defendant's previous convictions to extend his current sentence.

In 1843 he was involved with the case of Abner Rodgers, an inmate at the Massachusetts State Penitentiary accused of killing the warden of that prison. During his defense of Rodgers, Bemis argued that the man was insane and not responsible for his actions. Chief Justice Lemuel Shaw issued an opinion that became the American authority on insanity pleas during criminal prosecution.

The second major case that Bemis was involved in was the Parkman-Webster murder case. Bemis acted as co-counsel to Massachusetts Attorney General John H. Clifford in prosecuting Harvard professor John White Webster for the death of George Parkman. Bemis was selected and paid $1,500 by the Parkman family to represent their interests in the case against Webster. This case was one of the first to use forensic dentistry and circumstantial evidence to prove a defendant's guilt.

In addition to serving as a lawyer for these landmark cases, he also acted as a court reporter during each trial. He eventually published his notes on each trial as the official transcription of the cases. The author Robert Sullivan, in his book on the case, characterized the published transcripts from the Webster trial were considered to be heavily edited and "slanted" to justify the execution of Dr. Webster.

In 1858 Bemis suffered a hemorrhage in his lungs while arguing a case regarding railroads. Subsequently, he moved to southern France for the remainder of his life. During this time in Europe, he focused on the study of public law; he published many pamphlets about neutrality in response to British positions on these topics. He died in Nice, France on January 18, 1878.

== Legacy and honors ==
- 1865, he was elected a Fellow of the American Academy of Arts and Sciences.
- Bemis Professor of International Law, the first of the professorial positions at Harvard Law School, was endowed in his will. "In his retirement he came to appreciate the need for an endowed chair which would support the advancement of knowledge and goodwill between governments. The Bemis Chair is given to a professor who is a "practical cooperator," has had a connection with public life, and is capable of seeing the United States as one nation among many." The chair is currently held by Jonathan Zittrain, and was previously held by Noah Feldman and Louis B. Sohn.
