= 2027 in Cambodia =

- Decades: 2000s; 2010s; 2020s
- See also: Other events of 2027; List of years in Cambodia

Events in the year 2027 in Cambodia.

== Events ==
=== Predicted and scheduled ===
- 6 June – 2027 Cambodian communal elections

== Holidays ==
- 1 January – New Year's Day
- 7 January – Genocide Victory Day
- 8 March – International Women's Day
- 14–16 April – Cambodian New Year
- 1 May – Labour Day
- 14 May – King Sihamoni's Birthday
- 20 May – Visakh Bochea
- 24 May – Royal Ploughing Ceremony
- 18 June – Queen Mother's Birthday
- 24 September – Constitution Day
- 29 September–1 October – Pchum Ben
- 15 October – Commemoration Day of the King's Father
- 29 October – King Norodom Sihamoni's Coronation Day
- 9 November – Independence Day
- 12–14 November – Royal Water Festival
- 29 December – Cambodia Peace Day
