= 2026 in Cambodia =

- Decades: 2000s; 2010s; 2020s
- See also: Other events of 2026; List of years in Cambodia

Events in the year 2026 in Cambodia.

== Incumbents ==
- King: Norodom Sihamoni
- Prime Minister: Hun Manet (CPP)
- President of the Senate: Hun Sen (CPP)
- President of the National Assembly: Khuon Sudary (CPP)

== Events ==
=== January ===
- 6 January –
  - Two soldiers are injured in the explosion of a garbage pile in Preah Vihear province.
  - Chen Zhi, the founder of Prince Group, is arrested and subsequently extradited to China to face charges of cryptocurrency fraud and human trafficking.
- 8 January – The National Bank orders the liquidation of Prince Bank and suspends its operations after founder Chen Zhi was indicted by the United States for large-scale fraud.

=== February ===
- 22 February – The Royal Thai Navy seizes a Cambodian fishing vessel along the maritime boundary between the two countries.
- 25 February – Opposition politician Sun Chanthy, who had been imprisoned since 2024 on charges of inciting social disorder, is released after receiving a royal pardon.
- 27 February – Seventy-four artefacts looted from Cambodia by British art collector and dealer Douglas Latchford are formally repatriated at the National Museum of Cambodia in Phnom Penh.

=== March ===
- 4 March – Taiwanese prosecutors indict 62 people, including Chen Zhi, for their alleged links to the Prince Group, a multinational criminal network that operates scam centers in Cambodia. They also charge 13 companies with offences related to the criminal organization and money laundering.

=== May ===
- 5 May – Thailand revokes a 2001 memorandum of understanding with Cambodia aimed at resolving maritime border disputes.
- 23 May –
  - A revised conscription bill is signed into law, mandating compulsory two-year military service for males aged between 18 and 25 years.
  - A cargo truck and a truck carrying factory workers collide in Kampong Chhnang province, killing nine people and injuring 44 others.
  - A bus overturns in Svay Rieng province, killing five people and injuring 35 others.
- 25 May – Opposition leader Kem Sokha is granted a pardon following his conviction and 27-year sentence for treason.
- 27 May – Six Chinese nationals are sentenced to life imprisonment by the Kampot Provincial Court for the 2025 murder of South Korean national Park Min-ho, who was lured to work in a scam centre in Cambodia.

=== June ===
- 2 June – Cambodia files a notice to UNCLOS seeking compulsory conciliation of its maritime border dispute with Thailand.

=== July ===
- 24 July – The United States imposes a 10% tariff on Cambodia, citing the presence of alleged forced labour in the supply chain.

=== November ===
- 10 November – Five female students are killed while 21 others are injured when a bus overturns into a pond in Khsach Kandal District, Kandal province.

== Holidays ==
- 1 January – New Year's Day
- 7 January – Genocide Victory Day
- 8 March – International Women's Day
- 14–16 April – Cambodian New Year
- 1 May – Labour Day
- 11 May – Visakh Bochea
- 14 May – King Sihamoni's Birthday
- 15 May – Royal Ploughing Ceremony
- 18 June – Queen Mother's Birthday
- 21–23 September – Pchum Ben
- 24 September – Constitution Day
- 15 October – Commemoration Day of the King's Father
- 29 October – King Norodom Sihamoni's Coronation Day
- 4–6 November – Royal Water Festival
- 9 November – Independence Day
- 29 December – Cambodia Peace Day

== Deaths ==
- 14 August – Bou Meng, 85, Cambodian genocide survivor
- 31 August – Chan Sarun, 78, minister of agriculture (1998–2013) and MP (since 2003)
