= 2025 in Cambodia =

- Decades: 2000s; 2010s; 2020s
- See also: Other events of 2025; List of years in Cambodia

Events in the year 2025 in Cambodia.

== Incumbents ==
- King: Norodom Sihamoni
- Prime Minister: Hun Manet (CPP)
- President of the Senate: Hun Sen (CPP)
- President of the National Assembly: Khuon Sudary (CPP)

== Events ==
=== January ===
- 5 January – Fifty-seven foreigners of mainly Pakistani or Nepalese origin are rescued from the O’Smach Resort in Oddar Meanchey province.
- 7 January – Former Cambodia National Rescue Party MP Lim Kimya is shot dead in Bangkok, Thailand shortly after arriving from Siem Reap.
- 16 January – Two deminers are killed in an anti-tank mine explosion near Trapeang Prey in Oddar Meanchey province.
- 23 January – Four people are killed in a crowd crush involving a group of people awaiting Lunar New Year handouts at the compound of businessman Sok Kong in Phnom Penh.
- 25 January – The Cambodian Mine Action Centre suspends demining operations amid a U.S freeze on foreign aid.
- 30 January
  - The Australian Government allocates another AUD $2 million to the Clearing for Results Project to support Cambodia's efforts to become mine-free by 2030.
  - The Ministry of Environment reports, amid Cambodia's deteriorating air quality, that there are 199 active forest fires.

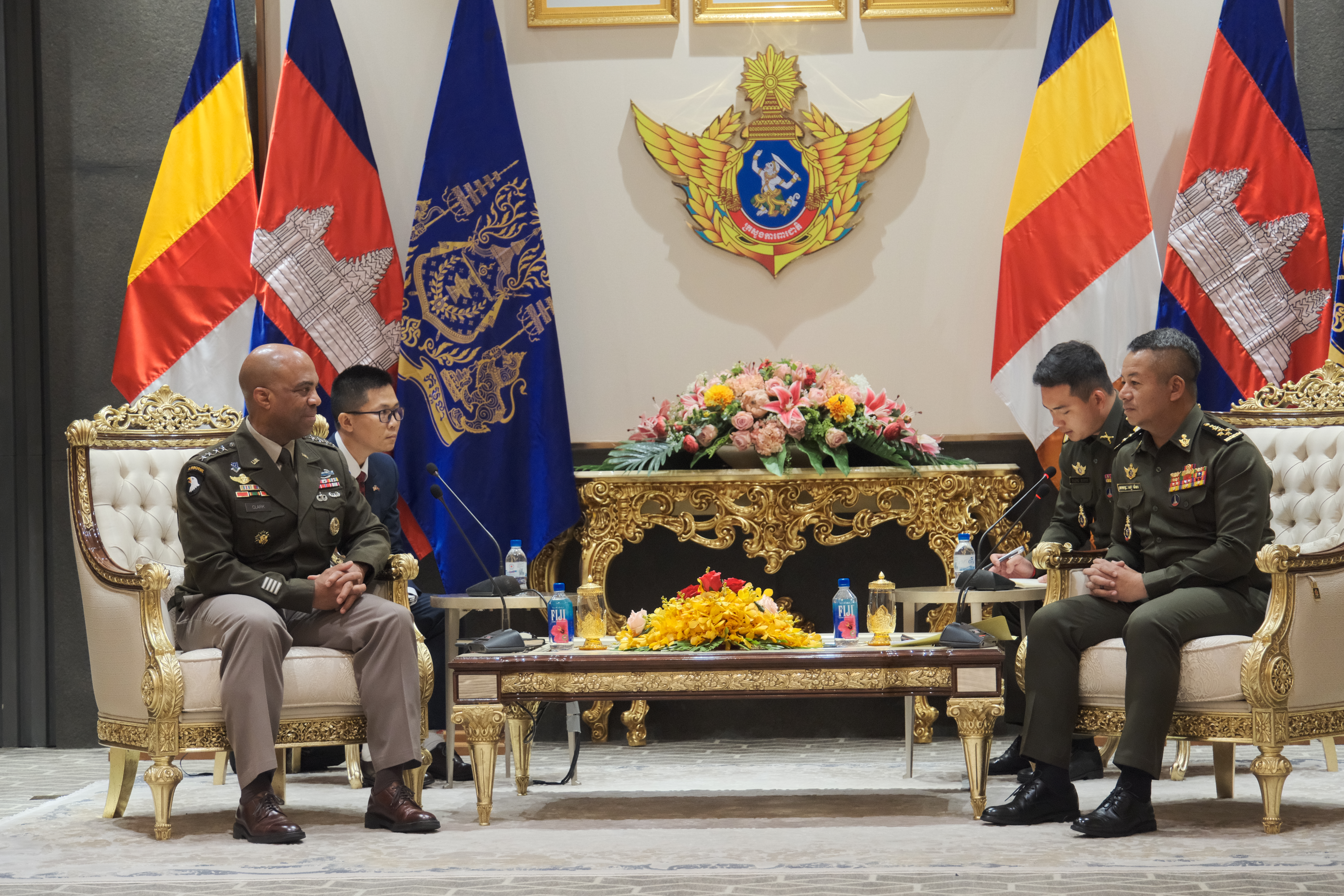
Tea Seiha, the Minister of National Defence, holding talks with U.S General Ronald P. Clark.

=== February ===
- 1 February – Canadian warship HMCS Ottawa (FFH 341) docks at Sihanoukville for four days to strengthen Cambodia–Canada relations.
- 13 February – A group of Cambodian visitors at the disputed Prasat Ta Muen Thom temple are prevented from singing the Cambodian national anthem by Thai soldiers, creating tension between the two countries.
- 18 February
  - The National Assembly unanimously passes a law increasing the punishment for denying crimes committed during Khmer Rouge rule.
  - Pailin province becomes the 16th province to achieve an open defecation free status.
- 20 February – After a pause on foreign aid, the U.S grants a conditional waiver to keep funding Cambodia's demining efforts.
- 23 February – A police raid on a scam centre in Poipet frees 215 foreign nationals, the majority being Thai nationals.
- 24 February – U.S General Ronald P. Clark begins a two-day visit to Cambodia to boost Cambodia–United States relations. During the visits, Vong Pisen, the commander-in-chief of the Royal Cambodian Armed Forces suggests the resumption of joint military exercises between the two nations.

=== March ===
- 9 March – Tith Vuthy, the deputy governor of Kampong Speu province, and two others are detained over corruption charges.
- 11 March – Authorities in Pursat province issue a 15-day notice for anyone illegally living within Phnom 1500 area to make it a ecotourism area.
- 20 March – Japan approves a USD $10.4 million grant to Cambodia's demining efforts.
- 21 March – Hun Sen promotes Tea Banh and Men Sam An to five-star generals.
- 26 March – Two artifacts dating to the Khmer Empire are returned to Cambodia by the Manhattan District Attorney's office.

=== April ===
- 3 April – As part the U.S' "reciprocal tariff" policy, it is announced that 49% tariffs will be placed on Cambodia, the second highest behind Lesotho.
- 4 April – Ronin, a Gambian pouched rat, becomes the most successful mine detection rat after detecting 109 landmines in Preah Vihear province.
- 5 April – Ream Naval Base is reopened following a three-year renovation program by China.
- 26 April - Flash flooding took place in Southern Phnom Penh by a torrential rainstorm. A hailstorm also occurred in the Northern Region.

=== May ===
- 5 May – Rong Chhun, a leading advisor to the opposition Nation Power Party, is convicted on charges of incitement and sentenced to four years' imprisonment.
- 16 May – Three people are killed in a lightning strike inside the Angkor Wat complex.
- 28 May – A Cambodian soldier is killed following a 10-minute clash between the Royal Cambodian Armed Forces and the Royal Thai Armed Forces in a disputed area along Preah Vihear Province.

=== June ===
- 13 June – The government orders a ban on the showing and broadcast of Thai films and television shows and announces plans to divert its international internet traffic away from Thailand amid diplomatic tensions with the said country.
- 17 June – The government orders a ban on the import of fruit and vegetables from Thailand.
- 23 June – Thailand orders a ban on tourists and others doing non-essential travel from departing the country through land borders with Cambodia.

=== July ===
- 11 July –
  - The National Assembly unanimously passes an amendment to the Constitution of Cambodia allowing expanded powers for the removal of individuals' Cambodian citizenship.
  - Three sites associated with the Cambodian genocide (Tuol Sleng Genocide Museum and Choeung Ek in Phnom Penh, and M-13 prison in Kampong Chhnang province) are designated as World Heritage Sites by UNESCO as part of the Cambodian Memorial Sites.
- 23 July – Thailand recalls its ambassador from Cambodia and expels Cambodia's envoy following a landmine incident that injured a Thai soldier on their disputed border.
- 24 July – Cross-border clashes break out between Thai and Cambodian forces, killing at least one person in Oddar Meanchey province.
- 28 July – Negotiations to end the 2025 Cambodia‒Thailand conflict are held in Malaysia, culminating with prime minister Anwar Ibrahim declaring a ceasefire agreement between the warring countries.
- 29 July – Twenty Cambodian soldiers are captured by Thai forces along their disputed border. Two of them are repatriated on 1 August.

=== August ===
- 8 August – A South Korean student is found dead in a pickup truck near Bokor Mountain in Kampot province after being abducted and tortured by a scamming syndicate, prompting the South Korean government to issue travel warnings on parts of Cambodia.

=== September ===
- 9 September – Techo International Airport is opened to service flights in Phnom Penh.
- 17 September – Twenty-eight people are injured following clashes between Cambodian protesters and Thai security forces in a disputed section of the Thai-Cambodian border in Banteay Meanchey province.

=== October ===
- 3 October – A court in Thailand sentences Thai national Ekkalak Pheanoi to life imprisonment for the murder of MP Lim Kimya in Bangkok in January.
- 14 October – The United States indicts British-Cambodian businessman Chen Zhi on charges of running forced labor camps in Cambodia to carry out cryptocurrency fraud schemes.
- 18 October – Sixty-four South Korean nationals are repatriated from Cambodia after being rescued from scam centers.
- 20 October – Techo International Airport is officially opened in a ceremony led by Prime Minister Hun Manet.
- 22 October – Eighty-six people, including 57 South Koreans and 29 Chinese, are arrested in a raid on a scam center in Phnom Penh.
- 26 October – Prime Minister Hun Manet and Thai Prime Minister Anutin Charnvirakul sign an official ceasefire agreement presided over by US president Donald Trump on the sidelines of the ASEAN Summit in Malaysia.

=== November ===
- 10 November – 2025 Cambodia‒Thailand conflict: Thailand announces the suspension of the ceasefire agreement with Cambodia following a landmine explosion along their common border that injures two Thai soldiers.
- 12 November – 2025 Cambodia‒Thailand conflict: One civilian is killed while three others are injured in a shooting by suspected Thai soldiers in Prey Chan, Banteay Meanchey province. The village is evacuated the next day.
- 20 November – A bus falls off a bridge into a river in Kampong Thom province, killing 13 people and injuring 24 others.

=== December ===
- 8 December – 2025 Cambodia‒Thailand conflict: Clashes break out between Thai and Cambodian forces along their common border in Preah Vihear Province, leaving at least five people dead, including four Cambodian civilians.
- 10 December – 2025 Cambodia‒Thailand conflict: Cambodia withdraws its delegation from competition in the 2025 SEA Games in Thailand, citing safety concerns.
- 13 December – Cambodia–Thailand conflict: Cambodia shuts down its border crossings with Thailand in response to resumed clashes after the Thai government announced an increased commitment to fighting.
- 18 December – Cambodia–Thailand conflict: Cambodia accuses Thailand of bombing Poipet, a popular gambling hub and crossing area on the border.
- 27 December – Cambodia–Thailand conflict: Thailand and Cambodia sign a new ceasefire agreement.
- 31 December – Cambodia–Thailand conflict: Thailand releases 18 Cambodian POWs held since July.

== Holidays ==
- 1 January – New Year's Day
- 7 January – Genocide Victory Day
- 8 March – International Women's Day
- 14–16 April – Cambodian New Year
- 1 May – Labour Day
- 11 May – Visakh Bochea
- 14 May – King Sihamoni's Birthday
- 15 May – Royal Ploughing Ceremony
- 18 June – Queen Mother's Birthday
- 21–23 September – Pchum Ben
- 24 September – Constitution Day
- 15 October – Commemoration Day of the King's Father
- 29 October – King Norodom Sihamoni's Coronation Day
- 4–6 November – Royal Water Festival
- 9 November – Independence Day
- 29 December – Cambodia Peace Day
