= 2024 in Cambodia =

- Decades: 2000s; 2010s; 2020s
- See also: Other events of 2024; List of years in Cambodia

Events in the year 2024 in Cambodia.

== Incumbents ==
- King – Norodom Sihamoni
- Prime Minister – Hun Manet

== Events ==
=== February ===
- 15 February – Taiwanese live streamer Goodnight Chicken is found guilty for "incitement to cause chaos to social security", in regards to his staging of a kidnapping on a livestream.
- 25 February – 2024 Cambodian Senate election
- 26 February – Tep Vong, the Supreme Patriarch of Cambodia, dies at the age of 92 after being in office since 1981.

=== March ===
- 18 March – Prime Minister Hun Manet orders a ban on musical horns on vehicles, citing threats to public order and road safety.

=== April ===
- 3 April – Hun Sen is unanimously voted in as president of the Cambodian Senate
- 27 April – Twenty soldiers are killed after ammunition explodes at a military base in Kampong Speu province.

=== May ===
- 26 May – 2024 Cambodian provincial elections

=== June ===
- 14 June – The Cambodian National Police and the National Authority to Combat Drugs seize and destroy seven tons of illicit drugs, mostly methamphetamine, worth US$70 million as part of a crackdown operation.

=== July ===
- 1 July – A court in Phnom Penh sentences ten members of the environmentalist group Mother Nature to between six and eight years' imprisonment on charges of plotting against the government and Lèse-majesté, following a trial described by human rights groups as an attempt to “muzzle criticism of governmental policies”.
- 12 July – A Harbin Z-9 military helicopter crashes in the Cardamom Mountains in Pursat Province. Its wreckage and the bodies of its two crew are found on 29 July.
- 23 July – Five people are killed in the Angkor Wat complex after being struck by a falling tree during a storm which also destroys several statues.
- 25 July – Candlelight Party president Teav Vannol is fined 6 billion riel (~US$1.5 million) for "defamation" of the current government to foreign media following his party being withheld from the 2023 Cambodian general election.

=== August ===
- 5 August – Construction of the Funan Techo Canal linking the Mekong River in Phnom Penh with the Gulf of Thailand via Kep Province begins.

=== September ===
- 12 September – The United States imposes sanctions on billionaire senator Ly Yong Phat for involvement in human rights abuses relating to online scam operations.
- 20 September – Prime Minister Hun Manet announces the country's withdrawal from an agreement establishing the Cambodia–Laos–Vietnam Development Triangle Area following protests against land concessions.
- 23 September – Twenty-four women from the Philippines and Vietnam are arrested in Kandal Province for participating in a surrogacy scheme. Thirteen of them are convicted on human trafficking charges on 3 December.
- 30 September – Journalist Mech Dara is arrested on suspicion of inciting violence over social media posts made regarding a rock quarry. He is released on bail on 24 October after appearing to have made a public apology.

=== December ===
- 26 December – The Phnom Penh Municipal Court convicts Nation Power Party president Sun Chanthy of inciting social disorder and sentences him to two years imprisonment and a permanent ban on voting and running for elected office.

== Holidays ==
- 1 January – New Year's Day
- 7 January – Genocide Victory Day
- 8 March - International Women's Day
- 13–16 April – Cambodian New Year
- 1 May – Labour Day
- 14 May – King Sihamoni's Birthday
- 22 May – Visakh Bochea
- 26 May – Royal Ploughing Ceremony
- 18 June – Queen Mother's Birthday
- 24 September – Constitution Day
- 1-3 October – Pchum Ben
- 15 October – Commemoration Day of the King's Father
- 29 October – King Norodom Sihamoni's Coronation Day
- 9 November – Independence Day
- 14–16 November – Royal Water Festival
- 29 December – Day of Peace in Cambodia

== Deaths ==
- February 26 — Tep Vong, leader of the Cambodian Buddhist community.
