= 2023 in Cambodia =

- Decades: 2000s; 2010s; 2020s
- See also: Other events of 2023; List of years in Cambodia

Events in the year 2023 in Cambodia.

== Incumbents ==
- King of Cambodia – Norodom Sihamoni
- Prime Minister of Cambodia
  - Hun Sen (until 22 August 2023)
  - Hun Manet (from 22 August 2023)

== Events ==
Ongoing COVID-19 pandemic in Cambodia

- 1 January – Dr. Kao Kim Hourn succeeded Lim Jock Hoi as the new Secretary-General of ASEAN, becoming the first Cambodian to hold the post.
- 9 January – Prime Minister: Hun Sen says that the government might make further amendments to country’s Constitution that will expend the 2021 dual citizens ban.
- 12 February – Cambodian prime minister Hun Sen orders the closure of one of the country's last independent news outlets, saying that its publications have hurt him and his son Hun Manet.
- 20 February – British authorities repatriate 77 pieces of Khmer jewellery from indicted art trafficker Douglas Latchford's family to the Ministry of Culture and Fine Arts of Cambodia.
- 24 February – Cambodia's Ministry of Health reports 12 more suspected cases of H5N1 influenza in Prey Veng province following the death of a 12-year-old girl, the first confirmed death from the virus since 2014.
- 3 March – A court in Phnom Penh, sentences opposition figure Kem Sokha to 27 years in prison on charges of "collusion with foreigners" and treason.
- 5 May – 2023 Southeast Asian Games officially opened in Phnom Penh.
- 23 July – 2023 Cambodian general election, the Cambodian People's Party (CPP) held all seats in parliament after the ruling party declared a landslide victory since the General election over five years ago.
- 7 August –
  - Hun Manet is appointed as the prime minister of Cambodia by King Norodom Sihamoni. Manet replaces his father, Hun Sen, who served as the prime minister since 1985.
  - A drunk wedding guest drives into a wedding in Chrouy Neang Nguon, Siem Reap province, Cambodia, injuring at least 13 Dutch nationals.
- 14 August – A secondary school in Kratié, Cambodia, once a supply depot during the country's civil war, temporarily closes after over 2,000 pieces of unexploded ordnance are found.

=== Sports ===
5 November – Dave Leduc and Prom Samnang are scheduled to fight in Phnom Penh.
