= 2022 in Cambodia =

- Decades: 2000s; 2010s; 2020s
- See also: Other events of 2022; List of years in Cambodia

Events in the year 2022 in Cambodia.

== Incumbents ==
- King of Cambodia – Norodom Sihamoni
- Prime Minister of Cambodia – Hun Sen

== Events ==
Ongoing — COVID-19 pandemic in Cambodia

- 14 January - Cambodia begins administering fourth doses of the COVID-19 vaccine for high-risk groups, including healthcare workers, government ministers, and members of the armed forces.
- 23 February - Cambodia begins its COVID-19 vaccination rollout for children over the age of three years, becoming the world's first country to administer vaccines for children under the age of five years.
- 7 June - Cambodia and China break ground on a joint expansion project of the Ream Naval Base near Sihanoukville.
- 14 June - A Cambodian court convicts 60 members of the former Cambodia National Rescue Party of treason, including Cambodian-American lawyer Theary Seng.
- 11-13 November - Cambodia hosted the 40th and 41st ASEAN Summits and related meetings in Phnom Phen. Leaders from ASEAN member states and dialogue partners, including the United States, China, Japan, South Korea, India, Australia, and others, met to discuss regional security, economic cooperation, the crisis in Myanmar, and post-pandemic recovery. Cambodia also hosted the Seventeenth East Asia Summit during the same period.
- 28 December - A fire in the Grand Diamond City casino hotel in Poipet, Banteay Meanchey province, kills over 25 people and injures dozens more.

== Deaths ==
- 11 January - Magawa, African giant pouched rat (b. 2013)
- 22 March - Thiounn Mumm, civil servant (b. 1925)
