= 1981 in Cambodia =

- Decades: 1960s; 1970s; 1980s; 1990s; 2000s
- See also: Other events of 1981; List of years in Cambodia

The following lists events that happened during 1981 in Cambodia.

== Incumbents ==
- President: Heng Samrin
- Prime Minister:
  - until 27 June: vacant
  - 27 June-5 December: Pen Sovan
  - starting 5 December: Chan Sy

== Events ==
=== June ===
Emblem of the People's Republic of Kampuchea (PRK) established, which mirrored the emblem of Vietnam

- 25 June - The new emblem of the People's Republic of Kampuchea was established, which adopted a national emblem following the traditional circular, socialist-style design of its closest ally, Vietnam.

=== November ===
- Cambodia by Kim Wilde was released
