= 1992 in Cambodia =

- Decades: 1970s; 1980s; 1990s; 2000s; 2010s
- See also: Other events of 1992; List of years in Cambodia

The following lists events that happened during 1992 in Cambodia.

== Incumbents ==
- President: Heng Samrin (until April 6), Chea Sim (starting April 6)
- Prime Minister: Hun Sen
