= 1993 in Cambodia =

- Decades: 1970s; 1980s; 1990s; 2000s; 2010s
- See also: Other events of 1993; List of years in Cambodia

The following lists events that happened during 1993 in Cambodia.

== Incumbents ==
- Head of State: Chea Sim (until June 14), Norodom Sihanouk (starting June 14)
- Prime Minister:
  - until July 2: Hun Sen
  - starting July 2: Norodom Ranariddh (first Prime Minister)
  - starting September 21: Hun Sen (second Prime Minister)

== Events ==
=== May ===
- A multi-party election was held in May 1993 under United Nations auspices to set up a Constituent Assembly.

=== September ===
- A new constitution was drafted.
- On September 23, the United Nations Security Council passes a resolution calling for a halt in Cambodia of "acts of violence and to all threats and intimidation committed on political or ethnic grounds."
