= 2013 in Cambodia =

- Decades: 1990s; 2000s; 2010s; 2020s
- See also: Other events of 2013; List of years in Cambodia

The following lists events that happened during 2013 in Cambodia.

== Incumbents ==
- Monarch: Norodom Sihamoni
- Prime Minister: Hun Sen

== Events ==
=== February ===
- February 4 - The remains of former King Norodom Sihanouk of Cambodia who died on 15 October 2012 are cremated in Phnom Penh.

=== March ===
- March 30 - Nuon Chea, the most senior surviving Khmer Rouge leader, is declared fit for trial by a United Nations-backed court in Cambodia.

=== April ===
- April 15 - A hearing into the territorial row between Thailand and Cambodia begins at the International Court of Justice in The Hague, Netherlands.

=== May ===
- May 16 - A shoe factory collapses in Cambodia, killing three.

=== June ===
- June 7 - Cambodia passes a controversial law that makes it illegal to deny atrocities committed by the Khmer Rouge regime.

=== July ===
- July 28 - Voters in Cambodia go to the polls for a general election with the governing Cambodian People's Party led by Prime Minister Hun Sen claiming victory amidst opposition claims of widespread irregularities.
