= 1984 in Cambodia =

- Decades: 1960s; 1970s; 1980s; 1990s; 2000s
- See also: Other events of 1984; List of years in Cambodia

The following lists events that happened during 1984 in Cambodia.

== Incumbents ==
- President: Heng Samrin
- Prime Minister: Chan Sy (until 26 December), vacant (starting 26 December)

== Events ==
=== August ===
On the 19th. Khmer blooded Mike Nget aka M-ROD of local Minneapolis Chili Peppers tribute was born, but in Rochester Minnesota USA. He was the 2nd child of Narom and Narim Nget who immigrated from Cambodia to escape the extreme violence and danger occurring prior years back.
