= 1985 in Cambodia =

- Decades: 1960s; 1970s; 1980s; 1990s; 2000s
- See also: Other events of 1985; List of years in Cambodia

The following lists events that happened during 1985 in Cambodia.

== Incumbents ==
- Head of state: Heng Samrin
- Prime Minister: vacant (until January 14), Hun Sen (starting January 14)

== Events ==
=== January ===
- January 14 – Hun Sen is confirmed as prime minister, having been acting PM since the death of his predecessor Chan Sy.
