= 2011 in Cambodia =

- Decades: 1990s; 2000s; 2010s; 2020s
- See also: Other events of 2011; List of years in Cambodia

The following lists events that happened during 2011 in Cambodia.

== Incumbents ==
- Monarch: Norodom Sihamoni
- Prime Minister: Hun Sen

== Events ==
=== January ===
- January 25 - Around 2,000 "green shirt" protesters in Thailand demonstrate over the government's handling of a border dispute with Cambodia.
- January 31 - Nuon Chea and Khieu Samphan, two of the most senior surviving leaders of the Khmer Rouge, appear in a Cambodian court to request release from pre-trial detention.

=== February ===
- February 5 - A Thai soldier is shot dead and four wounded in clashes with Cambodian troops in a disputed border area.
- February 6 - Cambodia says a disputed 11th century temple has been damaged on the third day of cross border clashes with Thailand.
- February 7 - Clashes occur between Thai and Cambodian forces near the disputed temple of Preah Vihear.

=== March ===
- March 16 - Police in Cambodia ask prosecutors to charge recruitment firm T&P with illegally detaining its staff.

=== April ===
- April 22 - Cambodia and Thailand exchange fire across their mutual border; with casualties on both sides.
- April 23 - Cambodia and Thailand clash on their border again.
- April 25 - Cambodian and Thai troops exchange fire for a fourth consecutive day.
- April 27 - Troops from Thailand and Cambodia exchange gunfire for the sixth straight day as the death toll from the conflict during the period reaches fourteen.
- April 28 - Thailand announces that it will send more troops to its border with Cambodia after a seventh day of fighting near Preah Vihear, that has killed 15 people.
- April 30 - Thai and Cambodian troops exchange gunfire near the Ta Krabei temple in Oddar Meanchey Province marking the ninth straight day of border clashes.

=== May ===
- May 12 - A former Cambodian prosecutor is jailed for 19 years on charges of corruption in the first case brought by the country's new anti-corruption unit.

=== June ===
- June 27 - A United Nations-backed tribunal in Cambodia holds its first hearings in the trial of four former senior Khmer Rouge officials, including former head of state Khieu Samphan and Pol Pot's deputy Nuon Chea.

=== September ===
- September 15 - The Prime Minister of Thailand Yingluck Shinawatra visits Cambodia in an effort to improve relations after the border clashes near Preah Vihear earlier this year which led to the deaths of twenty people.
- September 17 - Former Prime Minister of Thailand Thaksin Shinawatra visits Cambodia for high-level talks with the government of Cambodia over a variety of issues, including the ownership of Preah Vihear.

=== November ===
- November 21 - The trial begins of the three most senior surviving members of Cambodia's Khmer Rouge regime, on charges of genocide and crimes against humanity.

=== December ===
- December 13 - Three Thai soldiers are killed by a land mine near the border with Cambodia.
