= 2016 in Cambodia =

- Decades: 1990s; 2000s; 2010s; 2020s
- See also: Other events of 2016; List of years in Cambodia

The following lists events that happened during 2016 in Cambodia.

== Incumbents ==
- Monarch: Norodom Sihamoni
- Prime Minister: Hun Sen

== Deaths ==
10 July – Kem Ley, Political Activist (born 1970)
