= 2014 in Cambodia =

- Decades: 1990s; 2000s; 2010s; 2020s
- See also: Other events of 2014; List of years in Cambodia

The following lists events that happened during 2014 in Cambodia.

== Incumbents ==
- Monarch: Norodom Sihamoni
- Prime Minister: Hun Sen

== Events ==
- August 7 – Khmer Rouge leaders Nuon Chea and Khieu Samphan are found guilty of crimes against humanity and are sentenced to life imprisonment by the Khmer Rouge Tribunal.
