= 2015 in Cambodia =

- Decades: 1990s; 2000s; 2010s; 2020s
- See also: Other events of 2015; List of years in Cambodia

The following lists events that happened during 2015 in Cambodia.

== Incumbents ==
- Monarch: Norodom Sihamoni
- Prime Minister: Hun Sen

== Events ==
- 1 January - Cambodia achieves a lower middle-income status, with a GDP of USD 31.77 billion and GDP per capita of USD 1,875.
- 22 January — Cambodia marks 30 years of Hun Sen's rule.
- 2 February — Witness Keo Chandara testifies to the brutal torture methods used by Khmer Rouge guards at the Kraing Tachan center.
- March — A tribunal backed by the United States charges two leaders of the Khmer Rouge with Crimes against humanity.
- 17 April - Cambodia marks the 40th anniversary of the Khmer Rouge’s rise to power.
- May - At least 18 killed, 24 injured in a van crash in Bavet city, Svay Rieng province.
- June —
  - The government implements a deal with Australia to resettle some Vietnamese refugees held on the island of Nauru.
  - 230 Cambodian fishermen repatriated from Indonesia after years of poor treatment.
- 6 June — Death of Chea Sim, long-time CPP president and rival to Hun Sen.
- 13 July — A court in Phnom Penh launched an investigation into defamation and interference with justice charges against Ny Chakriya, who had previously questioned the impartiality of the judiciary in a prior case.
- 21 July — 11 opposition Cambodian National Rescue Party (CNRP) organizers were sentenced to 7 to 20 years in prison for participating in an alleged insurrection in 2014.
- August -
  - 16 dead, 23 injured in a private bus crash in Oddor Meanchey province.
  - Former Bavet governor Chhouk Bandith surrendered to authorities for his 18-month sentence for the 2012 shooting of garment workers.
- 13 August — Hun Sen orders the arrest of Hong Sok Hour, an opposition party member of senate for posting false information about the 1979 Cambodia-Vietnam political agreement to Facebook.
- October - Minimum wage for textile and footwear workers raised to $140/month.
- 26 October - Two Cambodian opposition lawmakers are physically assaulted by a mob outside the National Assembly in Phnom Penh.
- 30 October - Cambodia’s National Assembly votes to remove deputy opposition leader Kem Sokha from his position as Vice President.
- November - Kem Sokha removed as vice president of the National Assembly following allegations of racism.
- 15 November — Hun Sen issues an arrest warrant for opposition leader Sam Rainsy for his comments alleging that Foreign Minister Hor Namhong had been complicit in the crimes committed by the Khmer Rouge.
- December - Former Khmer Rouge navy commander Meas Muth charged by UN-backed court.
- 3 December - An unlicensed doctor is sentenced to 25 years for infecting over 100 people with HIV.

== Deaths ==
August 22 — Ieng Thirith, a notable member of the Khmer Rogue.
