= 1953 in Cambodia =

- Decades: 1930s; 1940s; 1950s; 1960s; 1970s
- See also: Other events of 1953; List of years in Cambodia

The following lists events that happened during 1953 in Cambodia.

== Incumbents ==
- Monarch: Norodom Sihanouk
- Prime Minister: Penn Nouth (until November 22), Chan Nak (starting November 22)

== Events ==
=== May ===
- May 9 - France agrees to the provisional independence of Cambodia with King Norodom Sihanouk.

=== November ===
- November 9 - The Khmer Issarak begins to fight the French Army and Cambodia joins the First Indochina War but the Kingdom of Cambodia is established.
