= 2018 in Cambodia =

- Decades: 1990s; 2000s; 2010s; 2020s
- See also: Other events of 2018; List of years in Cambodia

Events in the year 2018 in Cambodia.

== Incumbents ==
- Monarch: Norodom Sihamoni
- Prime Minister: Hun Sen

== Events ==
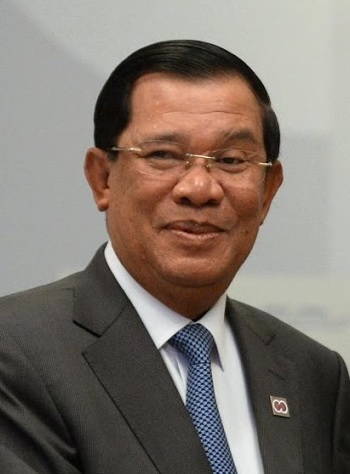
Hun Sen was reelected as prime minister at the 2018 Cambodian general election in July.

- 25 February – 2018 Cambodian Senate election
- 29 July – The 2018 Cambodian general election resulted in an expected victory for the ruling Cambodian People's Party, who won all 125 seats in the National Assembly.

== Deaths ==
- 20 March – Kak Channthy, 38, space rock singer.
- 25 October – Cheam Channy, politician (b. 1961).
