= 2009 in Cambodia =

- Decades: 1980s; 1990s; 2000s; 2010s; 2020s
- See also: Other events of 2009; List of years in Cambodia

The following lists events that happened during 2009 in Cambodia.

== Incumbents ==
- Monarch: Norodom Sihamoni
- Prime Minister: Hun Sen

== Events ==
=== February ===
- February 17 - Former Khmer Rouge leader Kang Kek Iew stands trial before the Extraordinary Chambers in Cambodia.

=== April ===
- April 3 - Four soldiers die as Thailand's Army and Cambodia's Army exchange gunfire near Preah Vihear.

=== July ===
- July 28 - AIDS campaigners and human rights groups accuse the Cambodian government of herding HIV-affected families into an "Aids colony" outside Phnom Penh.

=== September ===
- September 19 - Pro and anti government protestors demonstrate in the Thai capital Bangkok and near Preah Vihear along the border with Cambodia.

=== October ===
- October 11 - At least 10 people die and seven are declared missing in a river ferry sinking on the Mekong in Kratié Province.

=== November ===
- November 4 - The Cambodian government announces that ousted prime minister of Thailand Thaksin Shinawatra has been appointed as a government adviser.
- November 5 - Thailand and Cambodia recall their ambassadors over the Cambodian government appointment of former Thai Prime Minister Thaksin Shinawatra.
- November 10 - Thailand's ousted prime minister Thaksin Shinawatra arrives in Cambodia to take up his new appointment as economic adviser to the Cambodian government.
- November 11 - Cambodia rejects a request by Thailand to extradite ousted Thai Prime Minister Thaksin Shinawatra.
- November 13 - Cambodia detains a Thai man on charges of spying for Thailand.
- November 19 - Cambodia takes control of a Thai-owned air traffic control firm in a deepening diplomatic row between the two countries.
- November 23 - The war crimes trial of the Khmer Rouge in Cambodia hears its final arguments.

=== December ===
- December 19 - The Cambodian government expels 22 Chinese Muslim Uyghurs who arrived in the country back to China, despite criticism from the UN.

== See also ==
- List of Cambodian films of 2009
