= 2006 in Cambodia =

- Decades: 1980s; 1990s; 2000s; 2010s; 2020s
- See also: Other events of 2006; List of years in Cambodia

The following lists events that happened during 2006 in Cambodia.

== Incumbents ==
- Monarch: Norodom Sihamoni
- Prime Minister: Hun Sen

== Events ==
=== June ===
- June 7 - The World Bank Group says Cambodia must repay US$7.6 million in development funds that were mishandled.
- June 16 - Reacting to a report by Human Rights Watch, the United Nations High Commission for Refugees denies that Montagnard refugees and asylum seekers who have been returned to Vietnam from camps in Cambodia have been abused.

=== October ===
- October 30 - China to enhance relations with Cambodia.

=== December ===
- December 4 - Former US President Bill Clinton partakes in signing ceremony on behalf of his Clinton Foundation with Prime Minister Hun Sen in Phnom Penh.

== See also ==
- List of Cambodian films of 2006
