= 2012 in Cambodia =

- Decades: 1990s; 2000s; 2010s; 2020s
- See also: Other events of 2012; List of years in Cambodia

The following lists events that happened during 2012 in Cambodia.

== Incumbents ==
- Monarch: Norodom Sihamoni
- Prime Minister: Hun Sen

== Events ==
=== February ===
- February 3 - The Extraordinary Chambers in the Courts of Cambodia increases the sentence of Kang Kek Iew, or Duch, to life for running the Tuol Sleng prison camp under the Khmer Rouge.

=== March ===
- March 19 - Swiss Judge Laurent Kasper-Ansermet resigns from the international Khmer Rouge war crimes trial.

=== May ===
- May 16 - Cambodian police and soldiers skirmish with villagers after attempting to evict them from their land, where a Russian-owned plantation project was to be headquartered. A teenage girl was reportedly killed.

=== July ===
- July 8 - Cambodian health officials identify Enterovirus 71 as a possible cause for an outbreak in which at least 64 children died.
- July 13 - Cambodian troops aim machine gun fire at a Thai passenger jet, saying they believed it to be a spy plane, but do not hit the plane.

=== September ===
- September 2 - Gottfrid Svartholm Warg is arrested in Phnom Penh due to an international arrest warrant.
- September 12 - A Cambodian journalist is found murdered in the boot of his car, after reporting on illegal logging.

=== October ===
- October 15 - Former King of Cambodia Norodom Sihanouk dies in Beijing, China, at the age of 89.
- October 17 - The late King Norodom Sihanouk's body is returned to Cambodia.

=== December ===
- December 8 - Four children and four adults die after a night market fire in the town Siem Reap.

== Deaths ==
- October 15 - Norodom Sihanouk
