= 1979 in Cambodia =

- Decades: 1950s; 1960s; 1970s; 1980s; 1990s
- See also: Other events of 1979; List of years in Cambodia

The following lists events that happened during 1979 in Cambodia.

== Incumbents ==
- Chairman of the State Presidium: Khieu Samphan (until 7 January), Heng Samrin (starting 7 January)
- General Secretary of the Communist Party of Kampuchea: Pol Pot (until 7 January), vacant (starting 7 January)

== Events ==
=== January ===
- January 6 - Prince Norodom Sihanouk, who was placed under house arrest by the Khmer Rouge in 1976, is allowed to fly to China to evade Vietnamese troops advancing on Phnom Penh.
- January 7 - The People's Army of Vietnam (PAVN) (led by Lê Duẩn) and moderate dissidents from the Khmer Rouge (led by Heng Samrin) advanced and captured the city of Phnom Penh. Pol Pot and the Khmer Rouge are pushed out of the capital and begin a guerrilla war in the forests near the Thai border.
- January 8 -The Socialist Republic of Vietnam and the dissident rebels declare an end to Democratic Kampuchea, replacing it with the People's Republic of Kampuchea (PRK), a Vietnamese puppet state. Heng Samrin was installed as the head of the new PRK government.
- January 15 - The PAVN capture the city of Sisophon.

=== March ===
- Unknown date - The Thai government closed and mined the border with Cambodia, fearing the entry of an overwhelming flow of refugees. Refugee camps begin to appear in no man's land along the Thai-Cambodian border.

=== June ===
- 8 June - Dangrek genocide - Up to 45,000 Cambodian migrants were forced back into Cambodia by the Royal Thai Army at Preah Vihear, with up to 10,000 being killed attempting to cross minefields and descending the Dângrêk Mountains.

=== August ===
- Unknown date - UNICEF and the International Committee of the Red Cross are granted permission by the Vietnamese and PRK governments to deliver aid to quell famine in Cambodia.

=== September ===
- September 19 - The Credentials Committee of the United Nations (UN) votes 6-3 in favour of recommending that the Democratic Kampuchea delegation over the PRK delegation for Cambodia's seat.

=== November ===
- November 14 - The United Nations General Assembly voted on Resolution 34/2A, recognising the credentials of the Democratic Kampuchea delegation.
