= 2019 in Cambodia =

- Decades: 1990s; 2000s; 2010s; 2020s
- See also: Other events of 2019; List of years in Cambodia

Events in the year 2019 in Cambodia.

== Incumbents ==
- Monarch: Norodom Sihamoni
- Prime Minister: Hun Sen

== Events ==
- 10 March - Prime Minister Hun Sen said that he was considering introducing capital punishment for people who rape children, but he said it would only happen after a nationwide referendum. A couple days after this announcement, Hun Sen shifted his stance.
- Cambodia Bayon Airlines ceased operation

=== Television ===
- 10 February – I Can See Your Voice Cambodia first aired.

=== Sport ===
- February to November – The football tournament 2019 Hun Sen Cup
- 12 to 28 July – Cambodia at the 2019 World Aquatics Championships
- 4 to 13 August – Cambodia at the 2019 World Athletics Championships

== Deaths ==
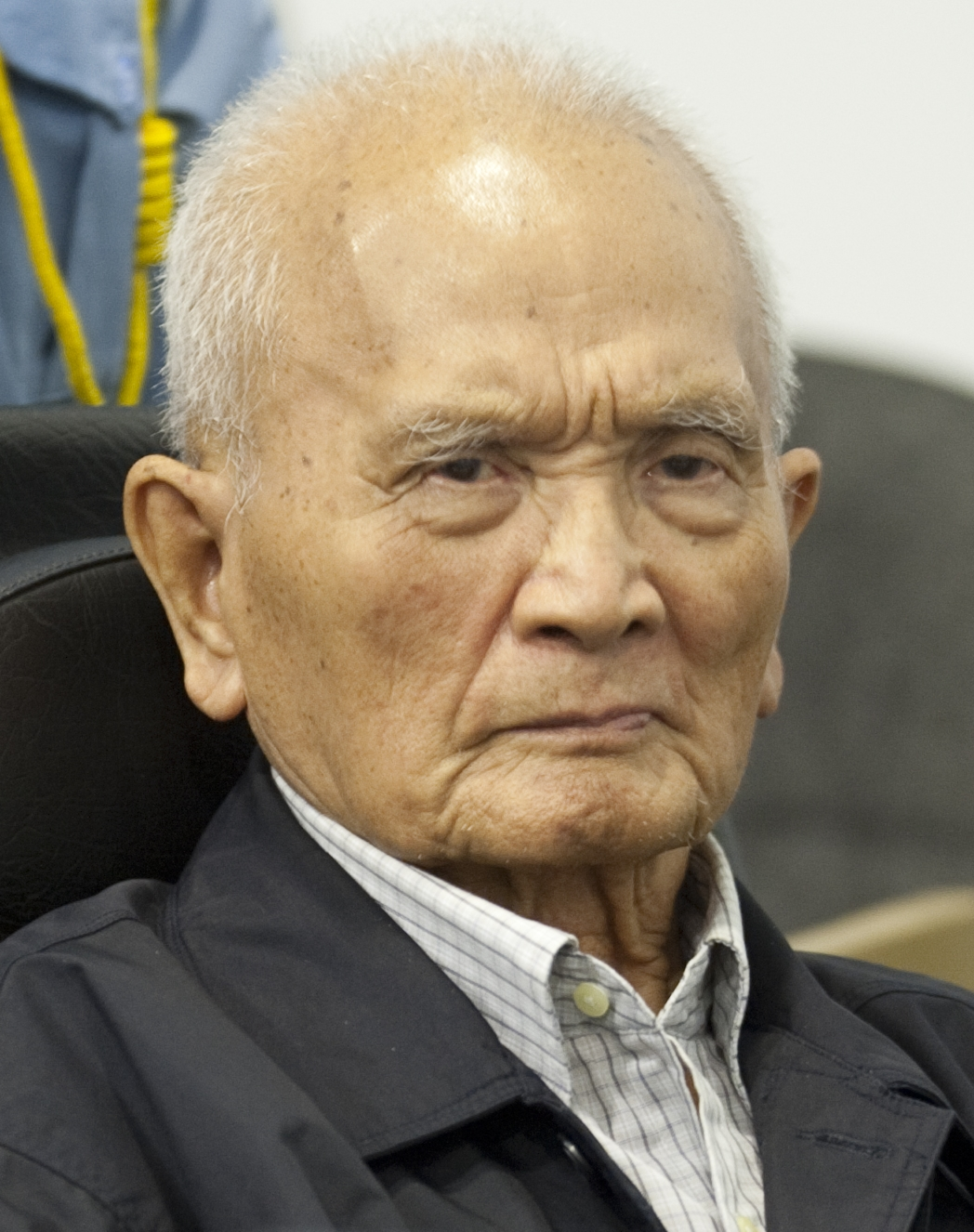
Nuon Chea

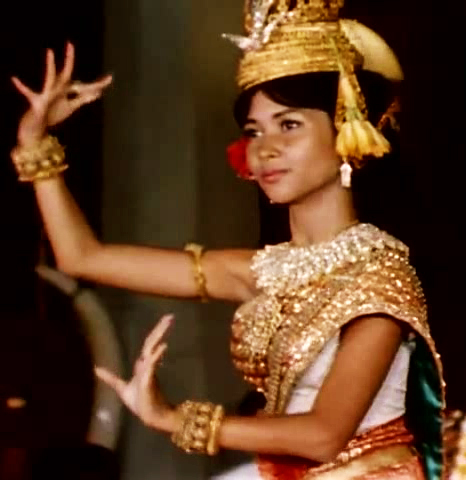
Norodom Buppha Devi

- 4 August – Nuon Chea, politician, chief ideologist of Khmer Rouge (b. 1926).
- 12 September – Bou Thang, politician (b. 1931).
- 18 November – Norodom Buppha Devi, royal, prima ballerina, and Minister of Culture and Fine Arts (b. 1943).
