= 2020 in Cambodia =

- Decades: 2000s; 2010s; 2020s
- See also: Other events of 2020; List of years in Cambodia

== Incumbents ==
- Monarch: Norodom Sihamoni
- Prime Minister: Hun Sen

== Events ==
- February 15 – First round of matches of the 2020 C-League.
- February 22 – Second round of matches of the 2020 C-League.
- February 29 – Third round of matches of the 2020 C-League.
- March 7 – Fourth round of matches of the 2020 C-League.
- November 16 – United Nations Human Rights Special Rapporteurs voice their concerns over "tightening restrictions on civil society in Cambodia." They drew attention to reports of threats, arbitrary arrests and detentions of at least 21 human rights defenders in 2020.
