= 1982 in Cambodia =

- Decades: 1960s; 1970s; 1980s; 1990s; 2000s
- See also: Other events of 1982; List of years in Cambodia

The following lists events that happened during 1982 in Cambodia.

== Incumbents ==
- President: Heng Samrin
- Prime Minister: Chan Sy
