= 2017 in Cambodia =

- Decades: 1990s; 2000s; 2010s; 2020s
- See also: Other events of 2017; List of years in Cambodia

Events from the year 2017 in Cambodia

== Incumbents ==
- Monarch: Norodom Sihamoni
- Prime Minister: Hun Sen

== Deaths ==
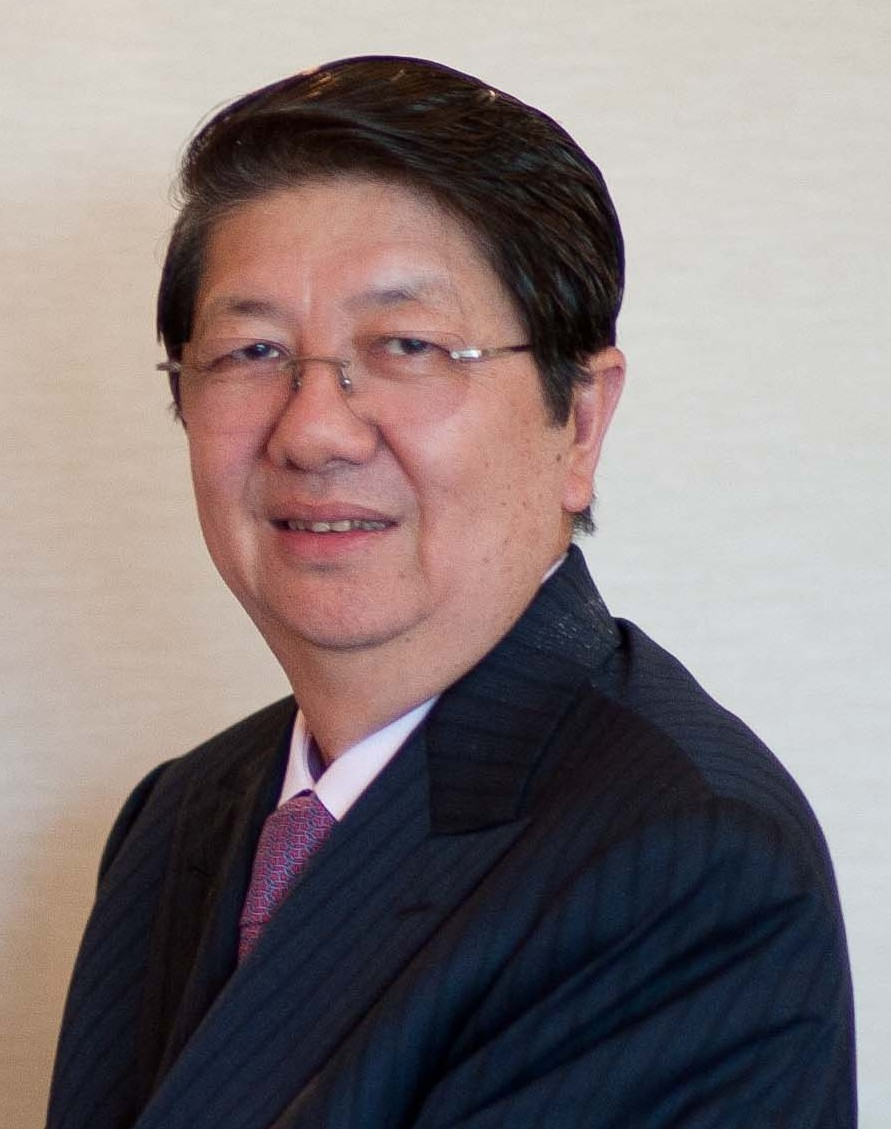
Sok An in 2010

- 15 March – Sok An, politician (b. 1950).
