= 2010 in Cambodia =

- Decades: 1990s; 2000s; 2010s; 2020s
- See also: Other events of 2010; List of years in Cambodia

The following lists events that happened during 2010 in Cambodia.

== Incumbents ==
- Monarch: Norodom Sihamoni
- Prime Minister: Hun Sen

== Events ==
=== January ===
- January 1 - A Cambodian court issues an arrest warrant for opposition leader Sam Rainsy, for failing to turn up at court over a border dispute with Vietnam.

=== May ===
- May 25 - A court in Thailand issues an arrest warrant for former Prime Minister Thaksin Shinawatra on charges of terrorism, following a report by the Thai Department of Special Investigations, which concluded that he had financed Red Shirt protesters and had helped them smuggle in weapons and fighters from Cambodia, during the 2010 political crisis.

=== August ===
- August 23 - Cambodia and Thailand resume diplomatic relations after former Thai Prime Minister Thaksin Shinawatra resigns his post as economic advisor to the Cambodian government.
- August 30 - 4 people are killed and 3 others are injured due to a rocket launcher explosion in Pursat Province.

=== September ===
- September 16 - The United Nations-backed Extraordinary Chambers in the Courts of Cambodia indict four Khmer Rouge leaders for genocide, war crimes and crimes against humanity for their role in the regime in the late 1970s, including Pol Pot's deputy Nuon Chea, former Foreign Minister Ieng Sary, Social Affairs minister Ieng Thirith and head of state Khieu Samphan.
- September 23 - Cambodian opposition leader Sam Rainsy is sentenced in absentia to 10 years' imprisonment for altering maps to show that Vietnam was encroaching on Cambodian territory.

=== November ===
- November 16 - An anti-tank mine explodes under a truck in Battambang province killing all 14 people aboard.
- November 22 - At least 339 people are killed at a stampede during Bon Om Thook (Khmer Water Festival) celebrations in Phnom Penh.
- November 23 - Cambodia declares a day of mourning for at least 378 people killed in yesterday's stampede in the capital Phnom Penh.

=== December ===
- December 15 - Four children are seriously injured in a mine explosion in Battambang Province.
- December 29 - Seven Thais, including an MP, are arrested after illegally crossing the border into Cambodia.
