= 2008 in Cambodia =

- Decades: 1980s; 1990s; 2000s; 2010s; 2020s
- See also: Other events of 2008; List of years in Cambodia

The following lists events that happened during 2008 in Cambodia.

== Incumbents ==
- Monarch: Norodom Sihamoni
- Prime Minister: Hun Sen

== Events ==
=== January ===
- January 16 - At the first Mekong-Japan foreign ministers meeting in Tokyo, Japan pledges US$20 million in aid for development projects in Cambodia, Laos and Vietnam. Left out of the aid picture was Burma, a former recipient of Japanese aid, whose foreign minister Nyan Win was present for the meeting.
- January 25 - Chinese foreign minister Yang Jiechi will visit Brunei, Cambodia and Australia on official visits from January 31 to February 5, the Foreign Ministry says.
- January 25 - A rear tire bursts on the landing gear of a Thai Airways International flight from Bangkok as it lands at Phnom Penh International Airport. There are no injuries among the 160 passengers and crew.
- January 26 - Thai officials say they will not oppose Cambodia's seeking World Heritage Site status for Preah Vihear, refuting a Thai Defense Ministry spokesman's earlier statements that the listing should not be granted without Thai participation.
- January 30 - FBI director Robert Mueller visits Vietnam and Cambodia on a mission to expand legal cooperation. In Phnom Penh, he is to open a new FBI office.

=== February ===
- February 4 - Former Khmer Rouge No. 2 leader Nuon Chea briefly appears before the Extraordinary Chambers in the Courts of Cambodia, asking for postponement of his appeal because of a dispute regarding his Dutch attorney and the Cambodian Bar Association.
- February 5 - US$2.808 billion was invested in Cambodia in 2007, according to the Cambodian Chamber of Commerce.

=== October ===
- October 16 - Cambodia and Thailand agree to joint border controls following a recent clash.
- October 19 - Cambodia agrees to release 13 Royal Thai Army soldiers captured during recent fighting in the 2008 Cambodian-Thai stand-off.

== See also ==
- List of Cambodian films of 2008
