= 1954 in Cambodia =

- Decades: 1930s; 1940s; 1950s; 1960s; 1970s
- See also: Other events of 1954; List of years in Cambodia

The following lists events that happened during 1954 in Cambodia.

== Incumbents ==
- Monarch: Norodom Sihanouk
- Prime Minister:
  - until 7 April: Chan Nak
  - 7 April-18 April: Norodom Sihanouk
  - starting 18 April: Penn Nouth

== Events ==
=== August ===
- August 1 - The First Indochina War ends with the Vietnam People's Army in North Vietnam, the Vietnamese National Army in South Vietnam, the Royal Cambodian Armed Forces in Cambodia, and the Royal Lao Army in Laos, emerging victorious against the French Army.
