= 2025 Sihanoukville Council election =

Local election in Cambodia

- 26 January 2025
- 13 seats in the Sihanoukville City Council; 7 seats needed for a majority
- Turnout: 31 (100%)
Party	Leader	Vote %	Seats	+/–
CPP	Hun Sen (Note: Did not run)	90.32	12	New
NPP	Chea Mony (Note: Did not run)	9.68	1	New
This lists parties that won seats. See the complete results below.

Elections were held in Sihanoukville, Cambodia on 26 January 2025, to decide the composition of the Sihanoukville city council. This is the first ever election for the newly formed Sihanoukville city council.

The government cited the objective of higher accessibility of public services, ensuring security for citizens, tourists and investors and promoting development of the region as the main reason in creating this new council.

The results were an expected landslide victory to the ruling Cambodian People's Party, where the newly formed opposition party, Nation Power Party was successful in meeting the threshold for a council seat.

== Electoral system ==
The party with a simple plurality of votes is given the role of Council He'd, regardless of whether they achieve an absolute majority in obtaining votes or seats. Where in addition to this, the composition of the council is decided using closed list proportional representation, under the d'Hondt method, which the number of council seats determined by the National Election Committee (NEC) was 13.

As this is a city council election, there is no universal suffrage, as only councilors who were directly elected in 2022 will be eligible to vote, thus making this election indirect.

== Contesting parties ==
Ballot Number	Party	Party Leader	Leading Candidate	Seats Contested	Ref.
1	Khmer Will Party	Kong Molika	Samrit Sophat	13 / 13	
2	Cambodian People's Party	Hun Sen	Soam Bien	13 / 13	
3	FUNCINPEC	Norodom Chakravuth	Teav Sopha	13 / 13	
4	Nation Power Party	Chea Mony	Aun Sarat	13 / 13	

== Results ==
Party	Leading Candidate	Popular Vote			Seats	
Party	Leading Candidate	Votes	%	Swing	Seats Won	Seat Change
Cambodian People's Party	Samrit Sophat	28	90.32%	New	12	New
Nation Power Party	Soam Bien	3	9.68%	New	1	New
FUNCINPEC	Teav Sopha	0	0%	New	0	New
Khmer Will Party	Aun Sarat	0	0%	New	0	New
Total	31		100%		13	
Valid votes	31					
Invalid/blank votes	0					
Total votes	31					
Registered voters/turnout	31 (100%)					
Source: National Election Committee

Party vote share
CPP	90.32%
NPP	9.68%
KWP	0%
FUNCINPEC	0%

Seat share
CPP	92.31%
NPP	7.69%
