= 2021 in Cambodia =

- Decades: 2000s; 2010s; 2020s
- See also: Other events of 2021; List of years in Cambodia

Events in the year 2021 in Cambodia.

== Incumbents ==
- Monarch: Norodom Sihamoni
- Prime Minister: Hun Sen

== Events ==
Ongoing — COVID-19 pandemic in Cambodia

- 21 April - Government of Cambodia imposes lockdown on COVID-19 red zones.
- 4 May - Journalists banned from reporting in COVID-19 lockdown area as cases soar.
- 5 May - Possible humanitarian crisis as multiple people in restricted areas report lack of foods.
- 7 October - Prime Minister: Hun Sen says that the government might make amendments to the country’s Constitution that would ban dual citizens from serving in the country’s top political posts
- 25 October - The National Assembly (Cambodia) passed amendments to the constitution, banning the prime minister, presidents of the National Assembly, Senate and the Constitutional Council from having dual citizens.
- 3 November - The King signs the Dual citizenship law ban.

== Deaths ==
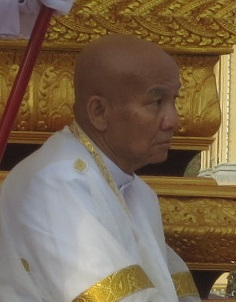
Norodom Yuvaneath

- 13 January – Norodom Yuvaneath, royal (born 1943).
