= 2007 in Cambodia =

- Decades: 1980s; 1990s; 2000s; 2010s; 2020s
- See also: Other events of 2007; List of years in Cambodia

The following lists events that happened during 2007 in Cambodia.

== Incumbents ==
- Monarch: Norodom Sihamoni
- Prime minister: Hun Sen

== Events ==
=== January ===
- January 19 – A girl who disappeared 19 years ago at the age of 8 was found living wild in the jungle in northern Rattanakiri Province. Police say the girl cannot speak any intelligible language.

=== February ===
- February 26 – Cambodian Prime Minister Hun Sen turned down calls for the remains of thousands of victims of the Khmer Rouge to be cremated. He said it was important for the skulls to stay on display as evidence that millions died during the late 1970s.

=== March ===
- March 7 – Cambodian and international judges begin talks to prevent the possible collapse of the Khmer Rouge trials. The trials, which aim to put the surviving leaders of the Maoist regime in the dock, have ground to a halt over procedural differences. Foreign judges want full international legal standards, while the Cambodians say local law must take precedence. Trial hearings are theoretically due to start later this year.
- March 16 – Cambodian and international judges have resolved most of their differences over procedures for a planned Khmer Rouge tribunal, court officials say. But a key disagreement about the role of foreign lawyers remains unresolved. The judges have held 10 days of talks in Phnom Penh on rules for the trials, which aim to put surviving leaders of the brutal Maoist regime in the dock. The judges have called a full meeting of legal officials to approve the rules at the end of April.
- March 19 – Prince Norodom Ranariddh is charged with adultery under a law passed last year by the Cambodian parliament. The prince, who faces a lawsuit from his estranged wife, lives in France. He also faces 18 months in prison for embezzlement from his former Funcinpec political party.
- March 22 – A former chief of police has been given a seven-year jail sentence for detaining a woman for more than two months without charge. It is one of a series of brutality charges facing the former head of Phnom Penh police, Heng Pov. He was cleared of separate kidnapping charges on Wednesday, but is already serving an 18-year jail sentence for ordering a judge's murder, and faces at least two more trials, for murder and attempted murder.
- March 31 – SMS is suspended in Cambodia in a move by the National Election Commission to prevent political parties from using mobile phone text messages in their campaigns ahead of local elections on Sunday.

=== May ===
- May 5 – Cambodia's Royal Ploughing Ceremony is held, marking the traditional beginning of the cultivation season. Oxen eat 45% corn offered to them, but there are conflicting news reports on what soothsayers believe this means. A Kyodo News report says Cambodia will have a normal rice harvest, but other English-language reports, including Agence France-Presse and BBC, say it means there will be poor harvest. King Norodom Sihamoni and Prime Minister Hun Sen joined in the ceremony.

=== June ===
- June 9 – Cambodian and international judges agree on rules for the United Nations-backed Khmer Rouge tribunal.
- June 25 – Authorities search in Kampot Province for PMTair Flight 241 that crashed. The flight from Angkor International Airport to Sihanoukville International Airport had 16 passengers – 13 South Koreans and three Czechs – plus a flight crew of one Russian and five Cambodians.
- June 26 – PMTair Flight 241
  - Authorities continue searching in Kampot Province for a PMTair Antonov An-24 that crashed with 22 people passengers crew aboard.
  - South Korean authorities put PMTair on a list of airlines it will inspect for safety. The airline operates direct flights from Incheon International Airport to Angkor International Airport.
- June 29 – The Thai foreign ministry says it will support a bid by Cambodia for UNESCO to make the Angkorian temple Preah Vihear a World Heritage Site. The temple lies along a disputed part of the border between the two countries.

=== July ===
- July 31 – Khang Khek Ieu, former head of the Khmer Rouge's notorious S-21 prison, is indicted with crimes against humanity by the Khmer Rouge Tribunal.'

=== October ===
- October 2 – A United Nations report criticizes the Cambodian administration of the Khmer Rouge Tribunal, citing inflated salaries of unqualified staff and "excess" hirings.
- October 29 – Security measures are tightened up in Phnom Penh ahead of the visit starting on Thursday by North Korean Premier Kim Yong-il.

=== November ===
- November 2 – Cambodia will build a new rail link to Thailand with US$80 million in funds it received from the Asian Development Bank and OPEC. Work on the 48-kilometer line between Sisophon and Poipet will start early next year and be completed by 2010, transport minister Sun Chanthol says.
- November 19 – Former Khmer Rouge head of state Khieu Samphan is arrested and detained on orders from the Khmer Rouge Tribunal.
- November 20 – The Khmer Rouge Tribunal opens its first public hearing, with an appeal for bail by Khang Khek Ieu, or Duch, the former administrator of S-21 prison.
- November 21 – Judgement is suspended on a pleading for bail by chief Khang Khek Ieu, a.k.a. Duch, so the former S-21 prison chief remains jailed. Prosecutors say freeing Duch would create public disorder, and that the 65-year-old former math teacher poses a flight risk.
- November 23 – Five Singaporeans are missing and presumed drowned after their dragon boat capsized during the Bon Om Thook races on the Tonlé Sap in Phnom Penh.

=== December ===
- December 17 – Cambodia and Thailand sign an agreement stemming from the ACMECS scheme that will allow foreign tourists to travel in the two countries on the same visa.
- December 17 – Around 40 to 50 Buddhist monks clash with riot police in Phnom Penh. At least nine people are injured. The violence ensues after a group of the monks are blocked from delivering a petition to the Embassy of Vietnam that sought to call attention to the Khmer Krom minority in Vietnam.
- December 25 – Cambodian bhikkhu and Bhikkhuni have been marching in support of the Cambodia Tribunal.

== See also ==
- List of Cambodian films of 2007
