= Theary Seng =

Cambodian-American human-rights activist and lawyer

Theary C. Seng
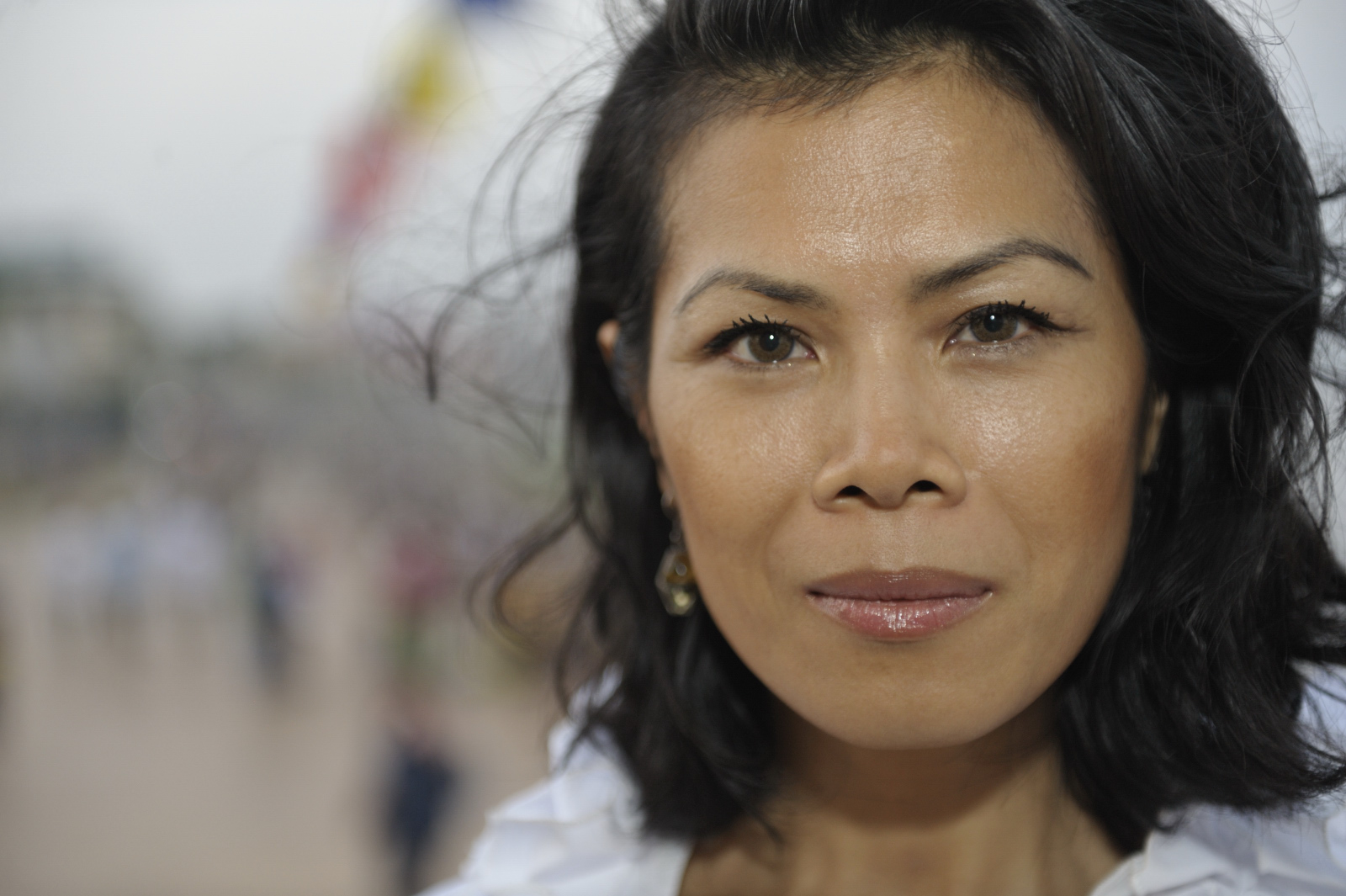
- Born: Chan Theary Seng; 1971 (age 54–55); Phnom Penh, Khmer Republic (now Cambodia)
- Education: Bachelor of Science from Georgetown University's School of Foreign Service; Doctor of Law (Juris Doctor, JD) from the University of Michigan
- Occupations: Human rights activist and author

Theary Chan Seng (born 1971) is a Cambodian-American activist who is currently imprisoned in Cambodia. She is an American and Cambodian dual citizen. Prior to her arrest, she was a human-rights activist and lawyer, former executive director of the Centre for Social Development, and president of the Center for Cambodian Civic Education (CIVICUS Cambodia). She is the author of Daughter of the Killing Fields, a book about her experiences as a child during the Khmer Rouge regime.

She was a high-profile activist for democratic reforms in Cambodia, often wearing elaborate outfits and costumes in order to attract attention to her cause. Her support of the CNRP and the return of its exiled leader, Sam Rainsy, led to the charges of “conspiracy to commit treason” and “incitement to create gross chaos impacting public security,”

In a mass trial in June 2022, Theary Seng along with 60 opposition supporters was sentenced to six years in prison on treason charges, prompting condemnation from rights groups and the U.S. government. The charging document contained no details about Seng other than listing her name as one of the accused and mentioned no details about any charges or alleged criminal wrongdoing against her. Her request to obtain information about the evidence for the charges against her was rebuffed by prosecutors. A few day after being imprisoned in Phnom Penh, she was transferred to a remote prison known for its terrible conditions in Preah Vihear where she now shares a 16x16-foot cell with 19 other women and has been prohibited from attending church services and making phone calls.

In a speech on June 28, 2023, Hun Sen stated, “I won’t pardon you [Theary] because I don’t trust foreigners who want to destroy me,” warning that he would not lessen her sentence in light of foreign interference in her case. In July 2023, the United Nations Working Group on Arbitrary Detention stated “no trial of Ms. Seng should have taken place” and that she was “targeted because of her activities as a human rights defender who disseminated posts and information that were critical of the Government” and called for her immediate release. The judgment further stated that mass trials like Theary Seng’s “are incompatible with the interests of justice.”

== Early life ==
Born as Chan Theary Seng, she moved to the United States in December 1980 with her four brothers after the Khmer Rouge was defeated by the Vietnamese army. At the age of seven, Theary had lost both her parents and many relatives to the regime. After 1995, she volunteered to work with a number of labor and human-rights associations. She earned her Juris Doctor degree from the University of Michigan Law School in 2000, and she has been admitted to the New York State Bar Association and American Bar Association. Seng later returned to Cambodia in 2004.

== Work ==
She was executive director of the Centre for Social Development, which largely focused on assuring a fair trial in the Khmer Rouge Tribunal. She then became the president of CIVICUS, an organization that works on civic education, reconciliation, and peace-building. She has worked with many former victims of the Khmer Rouge. Theary organized a darts campaign in Phnom Penh when President Barack Obama paid his first official visit to Cambodia. The game featured former Secretary of State Henry Kissinger, which brought attention to asserted American guilt in bringing the Khmer Rouge to power after the bombing.

Seng said that the American bombing in the early 1970s in Cambodia "had the direct consequence of killing half a million people and the indirect consequence of creating the conditions that gave us the Khmer Rouge. Kissinger is legally and morally responsible." She urged that the Khmer Rouge tribunal's mandate should be continued. During Kang Kek Iew aka Duch's trial, she withdrew as a civil party because of a controversy at the court.

== See also ==
- Democratic Kampuchea
- Killing Fields
- Tuol Sleng
- Chum Mey
- Vann Nath
- Enemies of the People (film)
