= Chrouy Neang Nguon =

Commune in Siem Reap Province, Cambodia

Coordinates: 13°51′N 103°31′E

Chrouy Neang Nguon (Khmer: ជ្រោយនាងងួន) is a commune in Srei Snam district, Siem Reap Province, Cambodia. The estimated population in March 2019 was 7,713 people. The municipality covers an area of 77.45 km^{2} and has a population density of around 99.59 inhabitants per square kilometers.

Geographically, Chrouy Neang Nguon is located in the northwestern portion of the country, north from Tonle Sap Lake and the ancient temple ruins of Angkor and Angkor Wat.

== Ancient structures ==
The region is home to three historical sites, being the Kok Mom Temple, which is a group of so-called “firehouses“ that lined the ancient roads of the Khmer Empire acting as the temple of a larger resting area, the Spean Khmeng which is a 35 meters long and 9 meters wide bridge at Anlong Lake, and the Yaey Tei Temple, which is an ancient brick temple, surrounded by a moat.

== History ==
The population has increased over the last few decades from 6,212 people in March 1998 to 6,405 people in March 2008, and then to 7,713 people in March 2019.

On 7 August 2023, a drunk wedding guest reportedly drove a car into a wedding in the municipality injuring at least 13 Dutch nationals.
