= Timeline of Cambodian history =

This is a timeline of Cambodian history, comprising important legal and territorial changes and political events in Cambodia and its predecessor states. To read about the background to these events, see History of Cambodia. See also the list of kings of Cambodia.

== Before 1st century ==
| Century | Date | Event |
|---|---|---|
| 2,500 years ago | | The walled city of Angkor Borei in Takéo province is Cambodia's first known city, with archaeological excavations unearthing moats, reservoirs, brick monuments, and glass beads that were traded in from the Near East and India. |

== 1st–8th centuries ==
| Century | Date | Event |
|---|---|---|
| 1st–6th | | Funan period – early state-like polities in delta and coastal regions, trading contact with India and China, "Indianisation" of Khmer society begins. |
| 7th–8th | | Chenla period – shift in trade patterns causes decline of Funan, emergence of large kingdoms in inland area, Indianisation continues. |
| 7th | | Isanavarman I of the Chenla Kingdom expanded Khmer influence to the Chao Phraya valley through his campaigns around the 7th century. Dvaravati cities that fell under Khmer hegemony became Lavo. |

== 9th century ==
| Year | Date | Event |
|---|---|---|
| 802 | | Jayavarman II declared independence from Srivijaya under the Sailendra, proclaiming himself the divine king of Kambuja. |
| 835 | | Jayavarman II died. His son Jayavarman III succeeded him. |
| 877 | | Jayavarman III died. He was succeeded by his cousin Indravarman I. |
| 890 | | Indravarman died. His son Yasovarman succeeded him. |

== 10th century ==
| Year | Date | Event |
|---|---|---|
| 968 | | Jayavarman V succeeded Rajendravarman II as ruler of Kambuja, now the Khmer Empire. |

== 11th century ==
| Year | Date | Event |
|---|---|---|
| 1001 | | Jayavarman V died. He was succeeded by Udayadityavarman I. |
| 1002 | | The king died. A civil war ensued between Jayaviravarman and Suryavarman I, both of whom claimed the throne. |
| 1010 | | Suryavarman became the uncontested king of the Khmer Empire. |
| 1050 | | Suryavarman died. He was succeeded by Udayadityavarman II, a descendant of Yasovarman's wife. |
| 1066 | | Udayadityavarman died. Harshavarman III succeeded him. |

== 12th century ==
| Year | Date | Event |
|---|---|---|
| 1107 | | Jayavarman VI died. He was succeeded by Dharanindravarman I. |
| 1113 | | Dharanidravarman died, possibly murdered by his great nephew Suryavarman II who succeeded him. |
| 1132 | | An attempted invasion of Vietnam was defeated. |
| 1150 | | Suryavarman II died, possibly in a military campaign against the Cham of Central Vietnam. Dharanindravarman II succeeded him. |
| 1160 | | Dharanindravarman died. He was succeeded by Yasovarman II. |
| 1177 | | Cham invaders took control of Yasodharapura, the Khmer capital, and executed the king. |

== 13th century ==
| Year | Date | Event |
|---|---|---|
| 1203 | | Jayavarman VII forcibly annexed the south of Champa. |
| 1219 | | Jayavarman VII died. He was succeeded by Indravarman II. |
| 1238 | | Two Thai chieftains in the city of Sukhothai declared the establishment of the Sukhothai Kingdom and its independence from Angkorian dominion. |
| 1243 | | Indravarman II died. Jayavarman VIII succeeded him. |
| 1283 | | Jayavarman VIII agreed to pay tribute to the Mongol Empire in lieu of suffering invasion. |
| 1295 | | Jayavarman VIII was allowed to abdicate after being deposed by his son-in-law Indravarman III (Srindravarman), the first king to make Theravada Buddhism the state religion. |

== 14th century ==
| Year | Date | Event |
|---|---|---|
| 1351 | | The Siamese Ayutthaya Kingdom laid siege to Angkor for a year and a half, then invaded and conquered it, leaving an Ayutthayan prince to rule. |
| 1357 | | King Suryavong led the Khmer army in retaking Angkor from the Siamese. |

== 15th century ==
| Year | Date | Event |
|---|---|---|
| 1431 | | The Thai invade Angkor. The Khmer capital is relocated to Srei Santhor and next year to Chatumuk. |
| 1471 | | Thousands of Cham settle in Cambodia as refugees from the fall of Vijaya (northern section of Champa) to the Vietnamese. |

== 16th century ==
| Year | Date | Event |
|---|---|---|
| 1505 | | The royal Khmer court moves to Oudong. |
| 1525 | | The royal Khmer court moves to Longvek. |
| 1593 | | King Sattha requested protection from the Spanish governor of the Philippines against the Thai. |
| 1594 | | The Thai captured the Cambodian capital, Longvek, and installed a military governor there. |
| 1595 | | Sattha died in Laos. |
| 1596 | | King Preah Ram I led the Khmer army to liberate Longvek from Siamese. |
| 1597 | | Spanish adventurers install a son of King Sattha on the throne. |
| 1599 | | The Spanish in Cambodia were massacred by Malay warlords. |

== 17th century ==
Note that names vary considerably from source to source, as do dates.

| Year | Date | Event |
|---|---|---|
| 1602 | | King Suriyopear (nephew of Sattha) installed with help of Ayutthaya. |
| c.1616 | | Nguyen Phuoc Nguyen, king of Hue, approaches Suriyopear to form a military alliance directed at their enemies Ayutthaya (for Suriyopear) and the Trinh dynasty of Hanoi (for Nguyen). |
| 1618 | | Suriyopear abdicates, enters a monastery (dies next year). His son Chey Chettha II becomes king. |
| 1623 | | According to the Chronicles and popular Cambodian belief, in this year King Chettha II allowed Vietnamese refugees from the Trịnh–Nguyễn Civil War to settle in the Khmer sea port of Prey Nokor. Professional scholars do not believe this happened. |
| 1628 | | Death of Chettha II; followed as king by his son Ponhea Tu, while his younger brother Outhei takes the title Ubhayoraj, or senior king. |
| 1632 | | Ponhea Tu killed after rebelling against the Ubhayoraj. Followed by his younger half-brother Ponhea Nur |
| 1640 | | Death of Ponhea Nur in suspicious circumstances. Followed by Padumaraja I, son of Outhei. |
| 1642 | | Murder of Padumaraja and Outhei by Ramadhipadi, son of Chettha II. Ramadhipati converts to Islam and takes the name Ibrahim. |
| 1658–59 | | Two sons of Outhei rebel against Ramadhipati/Ibrahim and call on Vietnamese help. First Vietnamese intervention in Cambodia, four more in the course of the century. Ramadhipati/Ibrahim captured and removed to Hue, where he dies. Ang Sur, son of Outhei, becomes king. |
| 1690 | | The Mekong Delta region of Cambodia (from Prey Nokor to Psar Dek and Moat Chrouk) was officially annexed by Vietnam. |
| 1698 | | An emissary arrived in Prey Nokor to establish Vietnamese administration over the expatriate population. |

== 18th century ==
| Year | Date | Event |
|---|---|---|
| 1749 | | The Vietnamese conquered the Mekong Delta. |
| 1779 | | A new Khmer king, Ang Eng, was installed under Thai protection. |

== 19th century ==
| Year | Date | Event |
|---|---|---|
| 1820 | | A Khmer revolt took place against Vietnamese rule . |
| 1841 | | Ang Duong becomes king. |
| 1851 | | Cambodia successfully overthrew the Vietnamese occupation. |
| 1856 | November 25 | Ang Duong dispatches a letter to French Emperor Napoleon III requesting intervention to protect Cambodia's territorial integrity. |
| 1860 | | In January, Angkor Wat is "rediscovered" by French naturalist and explorer Henri Mouhot. |
| 1860 | | Ang Duong dies. His son Norodom succeeds him. |
| 1863 | | Faced with a domestic rebellion, Norodom was forced to accept an offer of protection from the French. |
| 1887 | October | Cambodia was subsumed into the Indochinese Union. |
| 1897 | | The Résident supérieur was granted the royal powers of tax collection, rule by decree, and appointment of royal officials and crown princes. |

== 20th century ==
| Year | Date | Event |
|---|---|---|
| 1941 | | Japanese occupation of Cambodia: Japanese troops occupied Cambodia. |
| 1941 | | King Sisowath Monivong died. The French chose his grandson Norodom Sihanouk to succeed him. |
| 1945 | | After its defeat in World War II, Japan relinquished its Indochinese territories. |
| 1953 | 9 November | Cambodia officially gained its independence from France. |
| 1955 | 2 March | King Sihanouk abdicated in favour of his father, Norodom Suramarit. |
| 1963 | 27 August | Cambodia severed ties with South Vietnam. |
| 1970 | 18 March | General Lon Nol overthrew Sihanouk and established a republic. Start of the Cambodian Civil War and the US Cambodian Campaign |
| 1975 | 17 April | The Khmer Rouge allied with Sihanouk captured Phnom Penh and declared the establishment of Kingdom of Cambodia. |
| 1976 | 2 April | Sihanouk exiled and establishment of Democratic Kampuchea under total Khmer Rouge control. |
| 1977 | 31 December | Cambodia broke relations with the Socialist Republic of Vietnam. |
| 1979 | 7 January | Cambodian-Vietnamese War: Vietnamese troops captured Phnom Penh establishing the People's Republic of Kampuchea. The rule of the Khmer Rouge is over. |
| 1989 | 26 September | The last Vietnamese troops withdrew from Cambodia. |
| 1992 | 16 March | A United Nations peacekeeping force, the United Nations Transitional Authority in Cambodia (UNTAC), began monitoring Cambodia. |
| 1993 | May | Cambodia held free elections. The Khmer Rouge boycotted them. |
| 1993 | 24 September | A new constitution was ratified, under which the Cambodian monarchy was restored. Norodom Sihanouk returned to the throne. |
| 1997 | | The Extraordinary Chambers in the Courts of Cambodia, a tribunal for the Khmer Rouge, was established. |
| 1998 | 15 April | Death of Pol Pot. |

== 21st century ==
| Year | Date | Event |
|---|---|---|
| 2003 | 18 January | An Angkor newspaper reported that Suvanant Kongying, a Thai actress, had claimed that Angkor Wat rightfully belonged to Thailand. |
| 2003 | 28 January | Thai television programs were banned from broadcasting in Cambodia. |
| 2003 | 29 January | 2003 Phnom Penh riots: Nationalist rioters destroyed the Thai embassy in Phnom Penh. |
| 2003 | 7 July | Cambodian parliamentary election: Prime Minister Hun Sen's Cambodian People's Party won a majority of seats in the National Assembly. |
| 2004 | 14 October | King Norodom Sihanouk abdicated. His son Norodom Sihamoni was crowned as his successor. |
| 2008 | June | 2008 Cambodian-Thai stand-off: Clashes began with Thailand over territory immediately adjacent to Preah Vihear. |
| 2012 | 15 October | Former King of Cambodia Norodom Sihanouk died in Beijing at the age of 89. |
| 2014 | 3 January | Military police opened fire at opposition protesters, leaving 3 people dead and more than 20 injured. |
