= Goodnight Chicken =

Taiwanese YouTuber (born 1992)

- Born: Chen Neng-chuan; 30 April 1992 (age 34)
- Occupations: YouTuber; online streamer

YouTube information
- Channel: 晚安小雞官方頻道
- Years active: 2021–present
- Genres: IRL; exploring; horror; paranormal
- Subscribers: 123 thousand
- Views: 20.6 million
- Last updated: April 8, 2026

Chen Neng-chuan (Chinese: 陳能釧; born 30 April 1992), better known by his online alias Goodnight Chicken (Chinese: 晚安小雞), is a Taiwanese YouTuber and live streamer who was criminally convicted in the country of Cambodia. He is known for his livestreams exploring abandoned areas and buildings and for investigating paranormal activities. Chen became a prominent content creator in 2020 after discovering a mummified body in a hospital that he was exploring, which helped solve a missing persons case. Chen continued to create content revolving around paranormal themes, garnering controversy for allegedly trespassing private properties multiple times. In February 2024, he was arrested after staging his own kidnapping on a livestream with another Taiwanese live-streamer in Sihanoukville, Cambodia, and both were sentenced to two years in prison and ordered to pay a fine. The general public, including prominent Cambodian politicians, were unsympathetic towards him and supported the conviction. Following their release in March 2026, both were banned from the country and deported to Taiwan, where they face further criminal charges.

== Career ==
Chen Neng-chuan was born on 30 April 1992 and is Taiwanese. Chen is primarily known for his live streams exploring abandoned buildings for paranormal activities. In November 2020, Chen went to an abandoned hospital in Datong District, Taipei to film content, and accidentally found the hanging mummified body of a 38-year-old man who had been missing for over a year. He subsequently reported the find to local police. The man's mother thanked Chen for the discovery, and Chen later stated that he had nightmares following the incident. This incident has been regarded as Chen's breakthrough in content creation, commencing his rise in popularity as a live streamer.

In January 2022, Chen went into an abandoned building in North District, Taichung, and claimed to see a young girl's body. The local mayor and residents stated that there had been no body, and accused Chen of lying. The landlord of the building filed a lawsuit against Chen and three people accompanying him that day. Chen and the other three people were sent to the Taichung District Prosecutor's Office for investigation on charges of trespassing, defamation, and public endangerment. In August 2022, Chen explored a hospital in Kinmen and claimed it was haunted. The local government found these actions to be damaging, and reported him to police; he was asked to publish an apology in a newspaper and clarify that the hospital was not haunted. The same year, he broke into the Golden Empire Building in Yuanlin and filmed himself being chased by a homeless person with a knife. The authenticity of the act was questioned, with suspicion that the video was staged. The manager of the building filed a complaint against Chen for trespassing, and he was transferred to a court for prosecution for violating the Criminal Code for trespassing into a residence and for spreading false information.

In October 2022, Chen was assaulted by three men while filming in the defunct Chengguang Junior High School in Rende District. He sustained blunt trauma across his body and had a slight concussion. In May 2023, Chen claimed to have collaborated with Zhushan Zinan Temple to sell 10,000 bracelets blessed by the temple. The temple refuted the claim and stated all bracelets and accessories sold under their name online were fakes. Later that month, he claimed to have Year of the Rabbit and Year of the Tiger fortune cards that were produced by the Wong Tai Sin Temple in Hong Kong and attempted to sell them. The temple denied the claims. Chen has also allegedly sold counterfeit hair dryers on Facebook, selling them for 990 yuan and claiming they were Dyson products. The hair dryer received complaints after users claimed that buttons did not work and that the product emitted smoke.

== 2024 fake kidnapping incident ==
Goodnight Chicken fake kidnapping incident
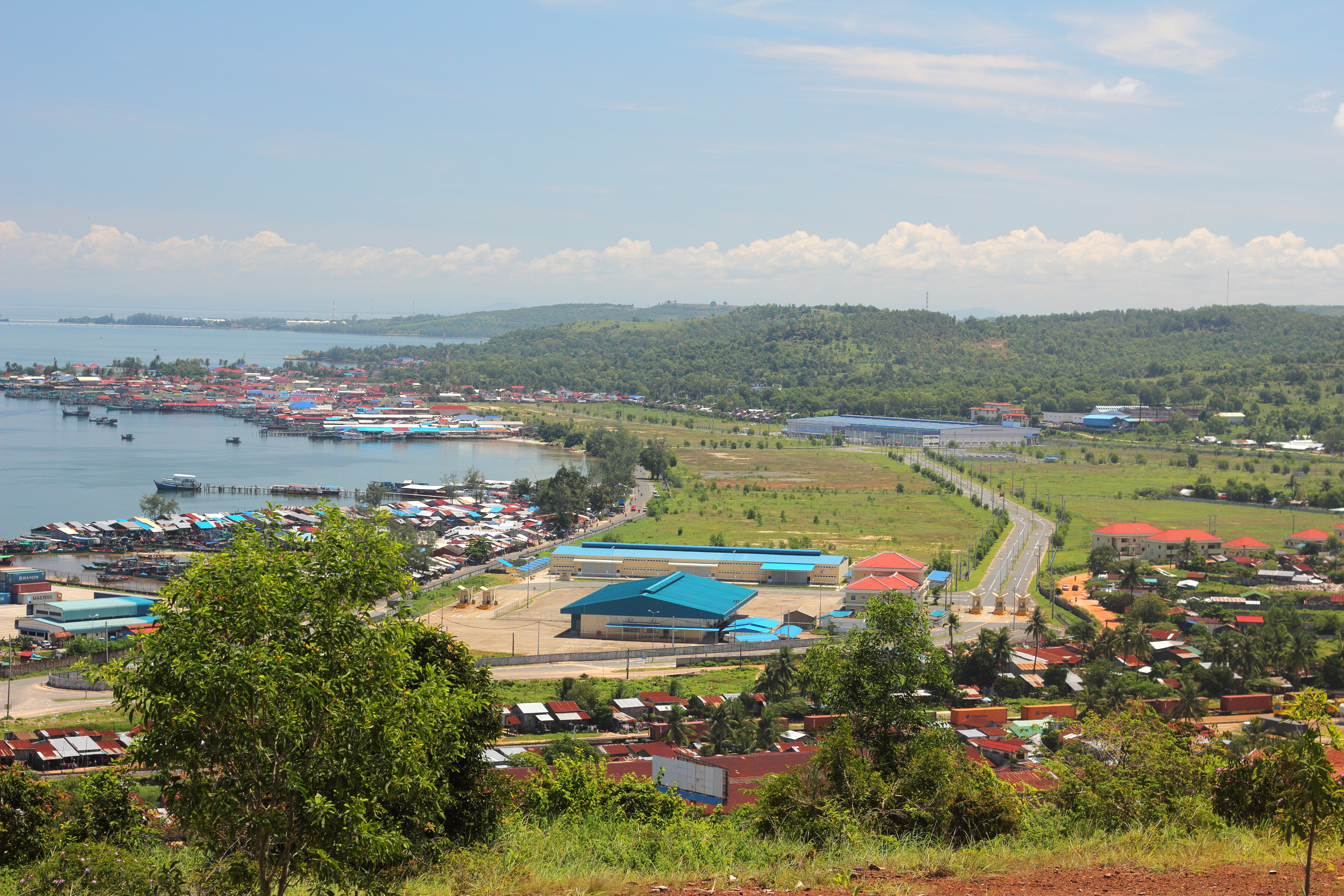
- Sihanoukville (pictured in 2014), where the crime took place
- Native name: 晚安小鸡事件
- English name: Goodnight Chicken Incident
- Date: 12 February 2024
- Location: Sihanoukville, Preah Sihanouk, Cambodia
- Type: Staged kidnapping
- Motive: Publicity
- Convicted: Chen Neng-chuan; Lu Tsu-hsien
- Verdict: Guilty
- Convictions: Incitement to cause chaos to social security
- Sentence: Two years imprisonment Combined fine of $2000; Life ban from Cambodia

On 11 February 2024, Chen arrived at Phnom Penh International Airport with friend and fellow internet personality Lu Tsu-hsien, known online as "Anow", and visited various locations in the city to shoot live streams. They originally planned to shoot at Phnom Penh Military Hospital, however did not after the site did not meet their expectations. On 12 February, Chen and Lu travelled to Sihanoukville. The area had become infamous for gangs kidnapping people and forcing them to partake in online scams. The scams involved luring people into the country with promises of high-paying jobs and forcing the victims to work in scam centers where they were often subject to human trafficking, torture, and kidnapping. Sihanoukville has been described as the centre of such operations. The same day, Chen started a live stream on YouTube claiming he had broken into a scam compound. He was supposedly pursued by someone wearing military attire, and Chen was beaten up before the stream abruptly ended.

Online viewership of the stream exceeded 10,000 concurrent viewers, and over 40,000 comments were made online following the stream. Shortly after the stream, Chen posted videos claiming he and Lu had been kidnapped and needed help. The fake kidnapping followed a string of high-profile kidnappings of Taiwanese citizens in Cambodia. His wife, who was still in Taiwan, posted a video on the Goodnight Chicken Facebook page claiming Chen had gone missing, whilst crying. Later, Chen would start another livestream claiming that he was running away from his kidnappers, and that he had his head partly shaven during the ordeal by them. In the video, he shows injuries apparently sustained during the attack and claimed he had been robbed. The then-governor of the province, Kuoch Chamroeun, posted about the case on Facebook, encouraging assistance into locating Chen's whereabouts. The Taiwan Foreign Ministry stated that no inquiries had been made by Chen's family regarding his whereabouts.

The credibility of the story was questioned online shortly thereafter. Influencer Liu Yu claimed to have found Chen's location, and said that Chen appeared to have run in circles. The pair were arrested on 13 February 2024, in their hotel rooms, and were found with equipment and props to be used for Chen's staged kidnapping. They were found guilty on 15 February of "incitement to cause chaos to social security", and the videos were discredited as fake content affecting the honour of the province. It was later found that the pair intended to create videos around human smuggling, torture, rape and organ trading whilst in the country, and had bought several items for the videos including fake blood, prop guns, and military outfits.

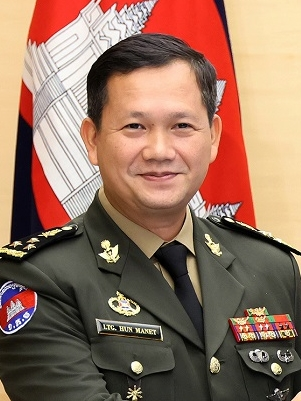
Prime Minister Hun Manet (pictured in 2022) criticised the crime and called for harsher punishments.

They were sentenced to two years in prison, ordered to pay a combined fine of $2000, and were banned from entering the country again. The quick sentencing and trial drew controversy in Chen's native Taiwan, where it takes at least two months for a verdict, especially due to the lack of official diplomatic relations between the countries. Following his conviction, Chen was placed in a cell with 150 other inmates, and was quoted as having a "miserable" time in jail. A month after being sentenced, Chen wrote a thousand-character apology letter to his wife. Chen is scheduled to be deported after serving his sentence. In 2025, Chen stated in a letter that while in prison he dedicated time towards "reforming himself". On 20 March 2026, Chen and Lu were deported to Taiwan after serving their Cambodian prison sentence, and were arrested upon arrival at Taoyuan Airport for other crimes they had allegedly committed in Taiwan involving "property damage, obstruction of freedom, and fraud".

=== Reactions ===
The pair were condemned by Cambodian politicians and the public, including by former Prime Minister Hun Sen, and Prime Minister Hun Manet, who believed the pair were damaging the country's reputation by making it out to be dangerous. Manet addressed the incident while at the opening ceremony for the Pattalon Bassac River Bridge, stating it harmed the country's tourism industry and misled foreigners. Cambodian authorities addressed the incident prominently, partly due to the government's active use of social media and efforts to revive tourism, with officials seeking to deter similar acts through public statements and the prospect of severe penalties.

Appeals were made to Manet for the pair's release out of sympathy, claiming that Chen's mother was severely ill. He rejected the request, instead calling for the sentence to be longer as they were "ungrateful sons", and personally demanded for the men to be kept in jail "for the rest of their lives". Deputy Prime Minister Hun Many condemned the behaviour, stating that the actions of Chen and Lu were "intolerable" and had damaged the honour of the country. Internet reaction towards the conviction was generally unsympathetic.
