= Cambodia–Canada relations =

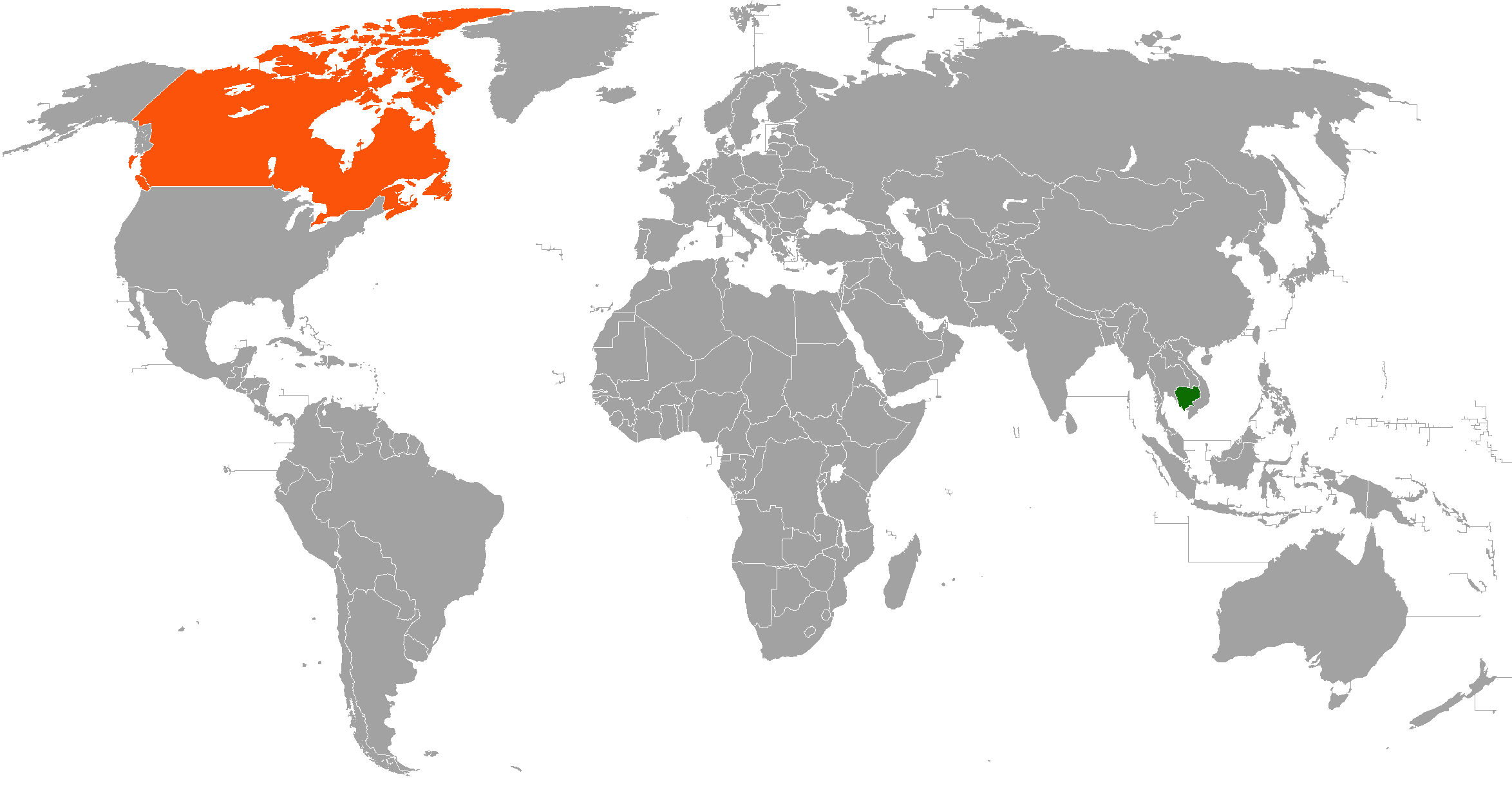

- Cambodia: Canada

Bilateral relations exist between Cambodia and Canada. The Canadian embassy in Bangkok, Thailand is also accredited to Cambodia, and has an office in Phnom Penh. Cambodia is represented in Canada through its UN mission in New York City.

== History ==
Canada supported the continued UN recognition of the (Coalition Government of) Democratic Kampuchea even after its 1979 loss of power in Phnom Penh, until the restoration of the Kingdom of Cambodia.

In 1997, Canadian foreign minister Lloyd Axworthy considered, but ultimately rejected, an American proposal to try Pol Pot on its soil under domestic war crimes legislation.

Canadian foreign minister, Stephane Dion, visited Cambodia in 2016.

== Peacekeeping ==
Over 1,000 Canadian UN peacekeepers have served in Cambodia in the ICSC, UNAMIC, and UNTAC missions.

== Immigration ==
Canada took in 18,602 Cambodian refugees through UN resettlement from 1980 to 1992.
