= 2024 Cambodian provincial elections =

- 26 May 2024
- Turnout: 99.79
- Provincial Councils
- All 559 seats in the provincial councils
Party	Leader	Vote %	Seats	+/–
CPP	Hun Sen	86.32	504	−46
KWP	Kong Molika	11.08	47	+47
NPP	Chea Mony	2.39	8	New
This lists parties that won seats. See the complete results below.

- Municipal, District and Khan Councils
- All 3641 seats in Municipal, District and Khan Councils
Party	Leader	Vote %	Seats	+/–
CPP	Hun Sen	86.10	3257	−227
KWP	Kong Molika	11.15	312	+312
NPP	Chea Mony	2.44	69	New
FUNCINPEC	Norodom Chakravuth	0.16	2	−31
KNUP	Nhek Bun Chhay	0.15	1	−37
This lists parties that won seats. See the complete results below.

Provincial, municipal, district and Khan council elections took place in Cambodia on 26 May 2024.

== Background ==
The Candlelight Party cannot take part in the election, because they are not registered with the Ministry of Interior. They can, however, apply and be approved by the ministry, allowing them to join.

== Electoral system ==
Only Communal Chiefs and Communal Councilors have the right to vote in Capital, Provincial, Municipal, District and Khan Council elections every 5 years.

== Results ==
=== Provincial Council ===
Party	Party Leader	Popular Vote				Councils		Seats	
Party	Party Leader	Votes	Vote Change	%	Swing	Councils Won	Council Change	Seats Won	Seat Change
Cambodian People's Party	Hun Sen	9,985	1,138	86.32%	10.2	25	Steady	504	46
Khmer Will Party	Kong Molika	1,282	1,282	11.08%	11.08	0	Steady	47	47
Nation Power Party	Chea Mony	276	New	2.39%	New	0	New	8	New
Khmer National United Party	Nhek Bun Chhay	14	161	0.12%	1.4	0	Steady	0	6
FUNCINPEC	Norodom Chakravuth	10	216	0.09%	1.87	0	Steady	0	3
Total	11,567			100%		25		559	
Valid votes	11,567								
Invalid/blank votes	31								
Total votes	11,598								
Registered voters/turnout	11,622 (99.79%)								
Source: National Election Committee

=== Municipal, District and Khan Councils ===
Party	Party Leader	Popular Vote				Seats	
Party	Party Leader	Votes	Vote Change	%	Swing	Seats Won	Seat Change
Cambodian People's Party	Hun Sen	9,950	1,163	86.10%	10.2	3,257	227
Khmer Will Party	Kong Molika	1,289	1,289	11.15%	11.15	312	312
Nation Power Party	Chea Mony	282	New	2.44%	New	69	New
FUNCINPEC	Norodom Chakravuth	18	195	0.16%	1.69	2	31
Khmer National United Party	Nhek Bun Chhay	17	182	0.15%	1.57	1	37
Total	11,567			100%		3,461	
Valid votes	11,556						
Invalid/blank votes	42						
Total votes	11,598						
Registered voters/turnout	11,622 (99.79%)						
Source: National Election Committee

Preliminary results saw the Cambodian People’s Party (CPP) sweep the majority of seats, followed by Khmer Will Party (KWP) and the Nation Power Party (NPP). The CPP won 504 seats in the Capital and Provincial Councils, KWP garnered 47 seats, with the NPP receiving 8 seats. Based on the results of the National Election Committee (NEC) of the 4th Mandate Capital and Provincial Council Election, the CPP received 9,985 votes, equivalent to 504 councillors made up of 479 members and 25 chairmen. The CPP won all the seats for the Capital and Provincial councils in Mondulkiri, Pursat, Preah Sihanouk, Takeo, Pailin and Oddar Meanchey provinces. The NEC added that the KWP received 1,282 votes, equivalent to 47 councillors and did not win the position of council chairman. The provinces where the KWP won the most seats were Prey Veng and Tboung Khmum. The NPP received 276 votes, equal to eight members, and did not win the position of chairman of the council.

Separately, for the City and District Council elections, the CPP won 9,950 votes, equivalent to 3,257 councillors, of whom 661 are women, including 209 chairmen and 3,048 members. The NEC said that the total number of seats for the City and District Councils for the fourth mandate in 2024 is 3,641, including 700 women. The CPP won the majority of seats for city and district council seats in Battambang, Kandal, Prey Veng, and Siem Reap provinces. The KWP received 1,289 votes, equivalent to 312 members, of whom 34 are women, but did not win the position of Chairman of the Council. The provinces with the most votes were Prey Veng, Kandal and Kampong Cham. The NPP received 282 votes, equivalent to 69 councillors, including five women, but did not win the chairmanship. The provinces with the highest number of votes were Siem Reap and Kampong Thom. FUNCINPEC received 18 votes, equivalent to two district councillors in Kampong Thom province. The Khmer National United Party received 17 votes, equivalent to one councillor in Banteay Meanchey province.
