= Khmer jewellery =

Jewellery of Cambodia

Khmer jewellery originated in the Khmer Empire. Khmer jewellery has been produced since the 6th or 7th century. Jayavarman VII, while he was an influential figure who established the different trends in Khmer jewellery, is famously represented without any at all in the seated position. The amount of jewellery acquired in Cambodia traditionally established a person's identity and status. Khmer jewellery consists of a diverse variety of styles and fashions. These styles can be categorised into three distinct groups: royal jewellery, wedding jewellery and the jewellery for the Cambodian Royal Ballet.

== Identity and status ==
In Cambodian society, gold is a symbol of power, status, authority, wealth, and loyalty.

Khmer jewellery is an element of national pride and identity. A special exhibition, called “Ancient Khmer Jewelry and Ornaments: Gold and Silver Masterpieces of the Collections of the National Museum of Cambodia”, was exhibited for one month from January 4 to February 3, 2018, at the National Museum of Cambodia, with "artifacts [which] underscore Cambodia's glorious, long-lasting civilisation which was once a past empire in Asia".

== History ==
=== Prehistoric Khmer jewellery ===
Jewelries were found in Cambodia since in prehistoric time especially the recent discoveries of prehistoric sites in Prey Veng and in Banteay Meanchey province. According to the scientific datation of the artifacts in association with silver jewelries from Prohear site in Prey Veng, silver jewelries can be dated to around 200 years B.C.

=== Khmer Jewellery since the Empire of Angkor ===
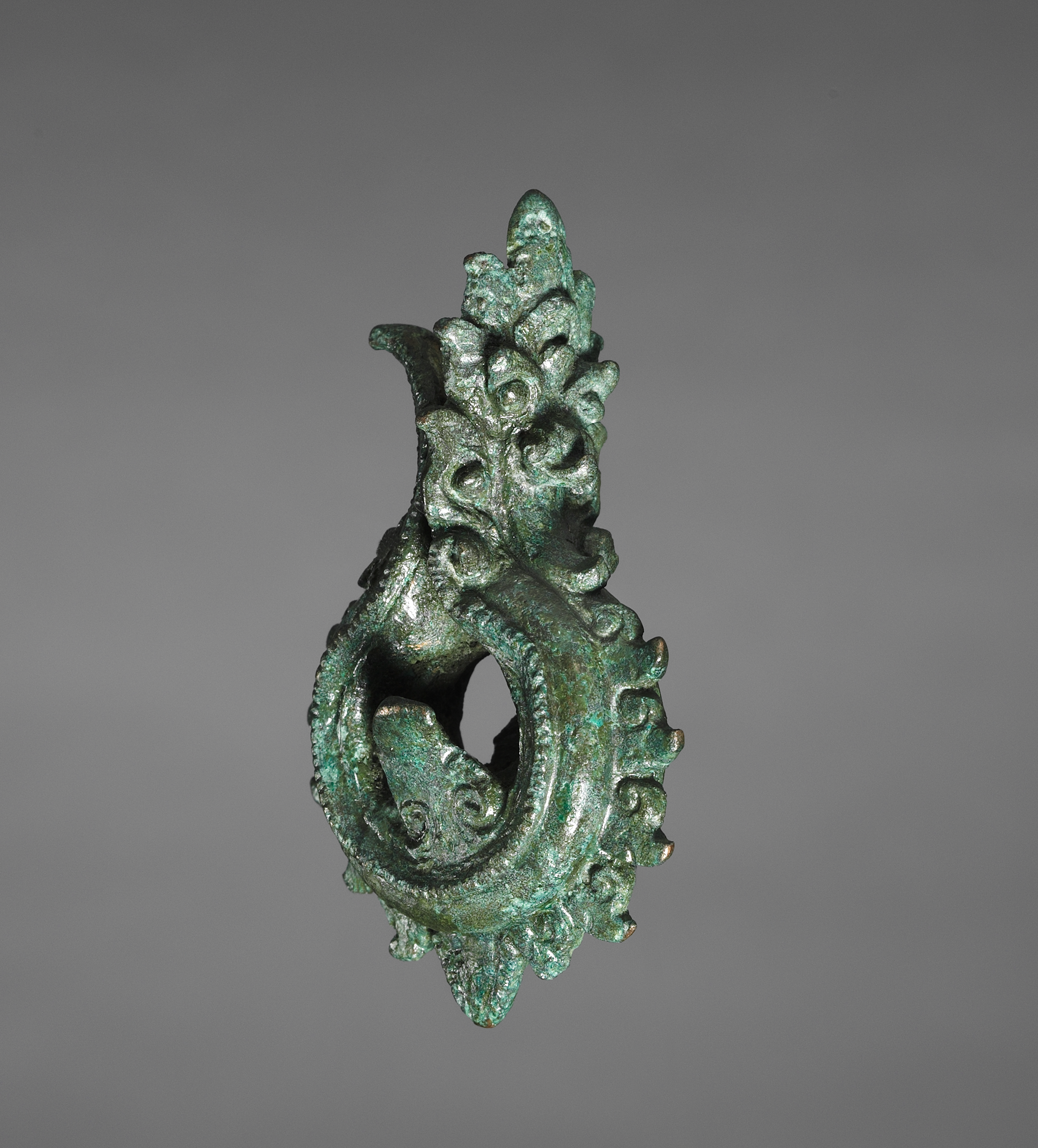
Khmer earring of the Angkorean period at the Cleveland Museum of Art.

Gold, silver, platinum, bronze, bronze, beads, gems were used by the ancient Khmer people to make jewelry for body decoration to enhance aesthetics. Khmer designed a variety of jewelry artifacts, still exhibited in the National Museum of Cambodia. Cambodian stoned statues adorned with carved jewels are evidence a rich diversity of jewellery made of gold, silver, bronze and gems. In Angkorian bas-reliefs, while certain devatas have little or no jewelry, they are in the minority and most possess extremely varied ornaments. Even in cases where they do not wear any ornaments, their earlobes are always elongated. An example is the Narayan statue erected during the reign of Udayadityavarman II in 1060. The statue is adorned with a set of jewels made of gold and with many precious stones, including crowns, earrings, and necklaces. Angkorian civilization also left behind a number of Khmer inscriptions recording the donation of jewelry as offerings.

=== Renewing Khmer jewellery at the École des arts cambodgiens in the 20th century ===
When, in 1922, George Groslier strived to create the École des arts cambodgiens, which is now the Royal University of Fine Arts, jewellery was one of the six disciplines taught in order to renew Cambian crafts and skills. Through the Colonial exhibition in Marseille in 1922, Khmer jewellery won international fame and would soon be on sale in Parisian boutiques.

=== Contemporary Khmer creations: recycling war and conflict ===
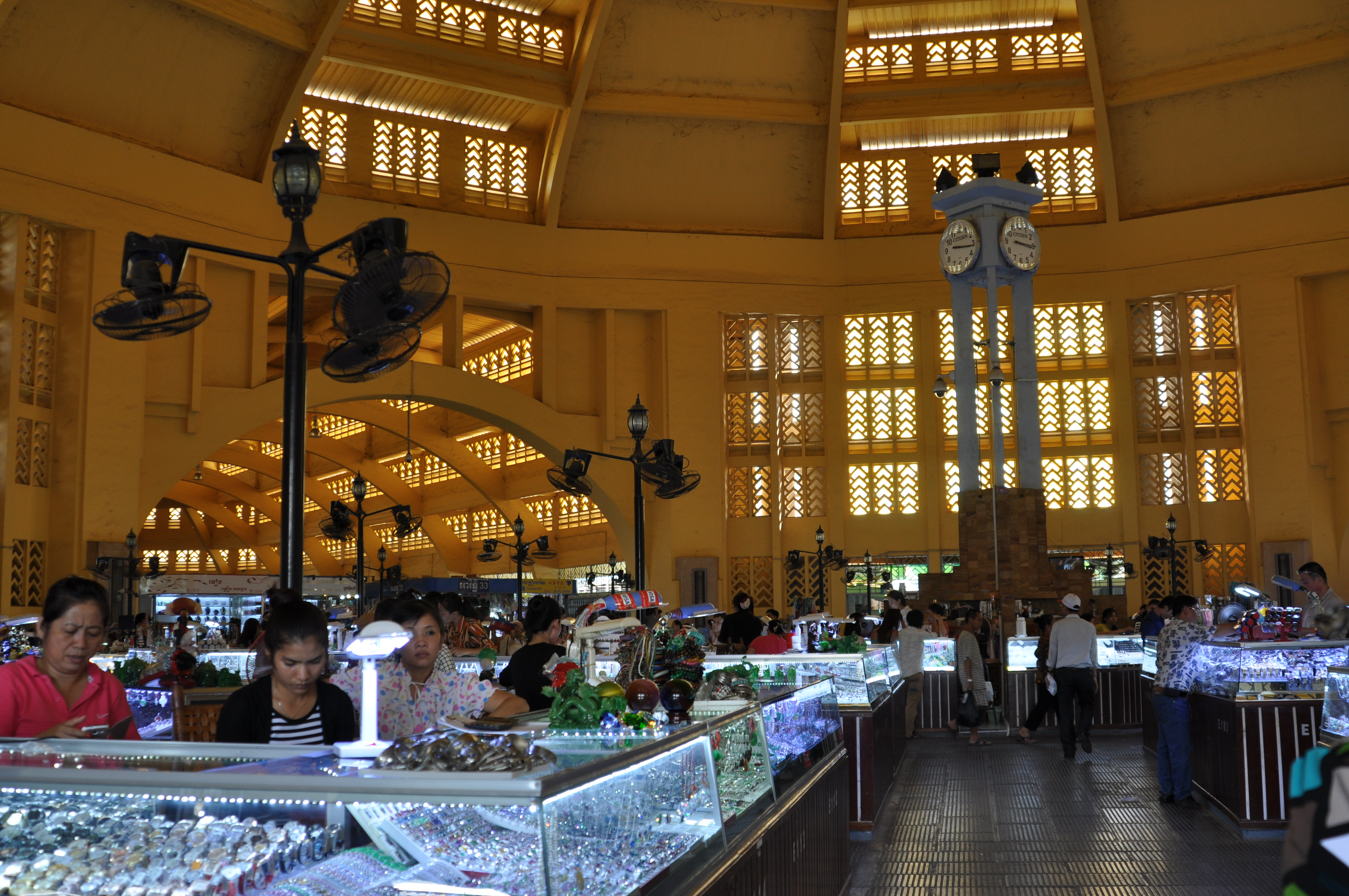
Jewellers in the Central Market of Phnom Penh.

Traditional Khmer jewellery remains popular in contemporary Cambodia. However, various new items of jewellery have become popular since the end of the Cambodian Civil War as recycling of weapons of war and bullets. Thus, Khmer jewellers produces unique jewellery pieces that have been fashioned from recycled bullet casings remaining from the days of war. The metal from the casing is melted down and sculptured into the works of art.

== Styles ==
=== Royal Khmer jewellery ===
The rulers of the Khmer Empire distinguished themselves the refinement of their jewellery, to which they gave special care and attention. Thus, a Khmer inscription in Pali language dating from King Indravarman III who climbed on the throne in 1296 AD mentions a pious laywoman named Sirimâlmïratanalakkhï, endowed with faith and other virtues, guardian of the royal jewellery. Khmer royal jewellery is usually composed of five elements: the royal crown, the royal sword, the royal dagger, the royal sash, and the two royal bracelets on the arms.

During royal cremations, the full royal jewellery is worn by the deceased king: the plaque of the belt made of a gold buckle with the royal arms named kabal khme khat, four gold buttons attached to the read and gold jacket, a double gold sash decorated with diamonds that cross each other on the chest, two bracelets called kang thap on the arms, the forearm bracelets called kang nak preas hast, and rings adorned with diamonds on the fingers and a pair of sandals made of solid gold named preas sopea beat.

=== Cambodian Royal Ballet ===
Dancers of the Cambodian Royal Ballet wear specific jewellery which closely resembles royal jewellery.

=== Khmer Wedding ===
According to the Khmer wedding tradition, clothing and apparel is formal, and the jewellery worn, inspired from royal jewellery, is stereotyped.

== Artifacts ==
=== Crowns ===
The most refined element of Cambodian jewellery is the crown which is worn both by the Kings and Queens, and by the dancers of the Cambodian Royal Ballet, though they are more often worn by the latter.

=== Bracelets ===
Khmer bracelets are kondrom are worn on both ankles and wrists.

=== Swords ===
While swords are primarily weapons of defence, the Cambodian Royal Sword or Preah Khan Reach, has integrated the finest elements of Khmer jewellery to become a symbol of power.

== Bibliography ==
- Bunker, Emma (2000) Splendour and Sensuality in Angkor. Period Khmer Jewellery. Orientations (Hong Kong). 31/3: 102–113.
- Bunker, Emma C.; Latchford, Douglas (2008). Khmer Gold: Gifts for the Gods. Douglas A.J. Latchford. ISBN 978-1-58886-097-2.
- Kong, Vireak (2009). Khmer silverwares. Reyum Publishing. ISBN 978-99950-55-48-6. OCLC 641072701.
