= Nation Power Party =

Political party in Cambodia

Nation Power Party គណបក្សកម្លាំងជាតិ
- Abbreviation: NPP
- President: Chea Mony
- Vice President: Sok Kimseng
- Senior Advisor: Rong Chhun
- Founders: Sun Chanthy
- Founded: June 2023
- Split from: Candlelight Party
- Headquarters: Trapaing Veng, Srayov, Kampong Svay, Kampong Thom, Cambodia
- Ideology: Liberal democracy Anti-corruption; Populism
- Colors: Red
- Slogan: "សិទ្ធិមនុស្ស យុត្តិធម៌ ឯកភាពជាតិ" ("Human Rights, Justice, Unity")
- Senate: 0 / 62
- National Assembly: 0 / 125
- Commune chiefs: 0 / 1,652
- Commune councillors: 0 / 11,622
- Provincial, municipal, town and district councillors: 77 / 4,114
- Provincial Governors: 0 / 25
- Sihanoukville City Council: 1 / 13

The Nation Power Party (Khmer: គណបក្សកម្លាំងជាតិ, UNGEGN: Konabaksa Kamleang Cheate) is an opposition party in Cambodia. The party opposes the government of the Cambodian People's Party led by Hun Manet. It ran in the 2024 senate elections and 2024 provincial elections but did not gather any seats.

== Background ==
After the Candlelight Party (CLP) was officially denied registration by the National Election Committee, meaning that they were disqualified from participating in the election. The reason given was a failure to submit proper registration documents, which the party's appeal as rejected by the Constitutional Council. Sun Chanthy who held positions as chairman of the Kampong Thom province branch, deputy secretary-general, and member of the Standing Committee, resigned from the party and declared the formation of the "National Power Party," a new political organisation he said he had 80 signatures in support of the formation.

=== Controversies ===
The Minister of Interior announced that Rong Chhun is violating a court order prohibiting him from being involved in politics by being an adviser to the National Power Party, and that his involvement with the party could result in some problems with the court. Rong Chhun was also found to almost failing to meet the deadline to pay a court fine.

Sun Chanthy, the party's leader, was sued by Sorn Sokheng, the executive chairman of the Candlelight Party (CLP) in Kampong Thom, for embezzlement of more than $50,000 in party funds. Chanthy accepted money from 19 CLP members while serving as the executive chairman of the CLP in the Santuk District. Each individual contributed 1,600,000 Riel (about US$390) in full or in part to the party's 2023 national election support.

=== Arrest of leader ===
The party leader, Sun Chanthy, was taken into custody following his return from a trip to Japan, where he convened with several hundred foreign Cambodian workers. According to Phnom Penh Municipal Police spokesman Colonel Sam Vichhika, Chanthy was taken into custody on Tuesday due to incitement, according to a warrant that the city court had issued for planting false information on social media with the intent to mislead the public and causing serious social unrest.

Though faced with many condemnations, the Ministry of Interior stated Chanthy's detention had no political motivation and refuted political parties' and experts' assertions that no arrests of political leaders or activists had ever been warranted. Hun Manet later commented saying that the law enforcement agency filed the complaint against the lawmaker because Chanthy had fabricated facts and defamed the government in relation to the National Social Security Fund (NSSF). According to Hun Manet, "the enforcement of the law against Sun Chanthy implements legal measures to protect the legitimacy of the Royal Government."

The party officially condemned the arrest and later received a warning from the Ministry of Justice calling the usage of the phrase "condemn" as inaccurate and unacceptable. The Ministry also ordered the party to reevaluate and speak in a way that upholds the legitimacy of law-abiding political players in a society where the rule of law is enforced.

=== Disagreements with the Candlelight Party ===
The Nation Power Party accused the Candlelight Party leadership of shifting their stance, abandoning liberal democratic principles in favor of dictatorship, coercion, intimidation, and violations of the electorate's secret ballot, as well as the expulsion of commune councilors. In response to the Nation Power Party's allegations, Ly Sothearayuth, the Secretary General of the Candlelight Party, told VOA via telegram that the removal or change of Commune / Sangkat Council is only for a small number of members who have violated party principles and only serve for other parties. He stated that the Candlelight Party's position had never changed, and that this was an intentional painting. Bad on the candlelight party leaders for using slander for political gain.

== Leadership ==
In the first party congress, where 200 party officials attended the Congress. Sun Chanthy was elected as the party's president and Chea Mony as vice president. Rong Chhun was named party's adviser after refusing a high position role after the Ministry of Interior warned to dissolve any political party that accepted him, with government officials claiming that he was not politically competent. In December 2024, Sun was convicted by the Phnom Penh Municipal Court of inciting social disorder and was sentenced to two years imprisonment and a permanent ban on voting and running for elected office.

After the arrest of Sun Chanthy, the party's founder and leader. The party congress voted to elect incumbent vice president Chea Mony as the party leader, he succeeded Chanthy. Sok Kimseng was subsequently elected as vice president to replace Chea Mony.

=== Party leaders ===
Leader	Political office	Took office	Left office
Sun Chanthy	None	12 November 2023	8 April 2025
Chea Mony	None	8 April 2025	Incumbent

== Ideology ==
The Nation Power Party advocates for democratic principles and workers' rights. The party ideology closely follows that of the Candlelight Party and CNRP. The party supports the democratic and political freedom in Cambodia and aims to continue the Candlelight Party's democratic efforts by ensuring free and fair elections in 2027 and 2028, the party seeks to serve the interests of Cambodians and the country as a whole with the goal uniting democratic factions to form a stronger opposition that can act as a strong opposition to the ruling Cambodian People's Party. The party also advocates for more rights for garment workers, the NPP places a high priority on protecting and promoting workers' rights. This includes fair labor practices and better working conditions.

== Electoral history ==
=== Senate elections ===
Election	Party leader	Votes			Seats		Position
Election	Party leader	#	%	±	#	±	Position
2024	Sun Chanthy	234	1.85%	New	0 / 62	New	▲3rd

=== By-elections ===
==== Sihanoukville City Council elections ====
Election	Party leader	Votes			Seats		Position
Election	Party leader	#	%	±	#	±	Position
2025	Chea Mony	3	9.68%	New	1 / 13	New	▲2rd
