= Independence Day of Cambodia =

National holiday in Cambodia

Independence Day បុណ្យឯករាជ្យជាតិ
- Independence Monument
- Observed by: Cambodia
- Type: National
- Significance: Commemorates the day of the Declaration of Independence from France
- Date: 9 November
- Next time: 9 November 2026
- Frequency: Annual

Independence Day (Khmer: បុណ្យឯករាជ្យជាតិ; French: Fête de l'Indépendance) is a national holiday observed annually in Cambodia every 9 November. The date celebrates Cambodia's Declaration of Independence from France on 9 November 1953. The site to celebrate the ceremony is at Independence Monument. The vital celebrations are held in the capital city, Phnom Penh although there are some celebrations in many provinces.

== History ==
France had controlled Cambodia since 1863. After being colonized around 90 years, King Norodom Sihanouk began claiming return to independence from France in 1949. In 1953, he was successful to regain full independence, and France agreed to decolonize the whole country. Due to this accomplishment, Cambodian citizens viewed him as "the father of independence (ព្រះមហាវីរបុរសជាតិ – ព្រះបិតាឯករាជ្យជាតិ)", which depicts that he was the hero of the country. He helped make the country develop rapidly.

== Celebration ==
Every year, Independence Day is a very special and happy day for the whole nation. It portrayed the Khmer success over colonization. It is celebrated in many places around the country, and the absolutely crucial one takes place at Independence Monument (វិមានឯករាជ្យ) in Phnom Penh.

On that day, all the leaders and representatives of state organizations and public departments must participate and celebrate the formal ceremony in the morning. Usually the roads around the Independence Monument are closed to provide the space for the ceremony. The whole ceremony is broadcast on national television and radio. Other channels also broadcast it from the National TV. Therefore, the people around the country can watch it.

Government offices are decorated with some slogans related to the independence of Cambodia as well as light displays. At night, there is fireworks displays in the Chatomuk River (ទន្លេចតុមុខ) located in front of the Royal Palace. Because it is the holiday, there are a lot of people going out to see that event in front of the Royal Palace and Chroy Changvar area, which is opposite to the Royal Palace.

The morning ceremony features the raising of the national flag and the lighting of a memorial torch at the Independence Monument, presided by the King of Cambodia in his capacity as Commander in Chief of the Armed Forces and navy force.
