= Year One =

Institution of radical and revolutionary change

The term Year One in political history usually refers to the institution of radical, revolutionary change. This usage dates from at least the time of the Bar Kokhba Revolt. The French Revolution and the Reign of Terror by Maximilien Robespierre and the Jacobin Club have also used it.

== French Revolution ==
Flag of the French Republic

Following the abolition of the French monarchy on 21 September 1792, the National Convention sought to eradicate all traces of the ancien régime. The Convention introduced the French Revolutionary Calendar (or the Republican Calendar), which was retroactively set to begin on 22 September 1792 — designated as "1 Vendémiaire" ("Year I"). This date marked the first day of the French Republic, coinciding with the autumn equinox. The establishment of Year I corresponds to the onset of the most radical and violent phase of the Revolution, with the Committee of Public Safety, dominated by Robespierre, taking power to enforce revolutionary "virtue" through terror. The adoption of Year One occurred during a time of extreme radicalization, following the September Massacres in 1792 that lead up to the Execution of Louis XVI in 1793. The Reign of Terror was a brutal, state-sanctioned purge led by Robespierre and the Jacobins to eliminate internal and external threats to the revolution which has marked by mass executions by the guillotine, the persecution of the Catholic Church which attempt to replace Christianity with the "Cult of Reason" where Robespierre later established the deistic "Cult of the Supreme Being". This new civic religion, which acknowledged a creator and the immortality of the soul, was inaugurated with a massive festival in Paris on 8 June 1794. Throughout the terror between 1793 and 1794, over a 10-month period, roughly 17,000 individuals were officially executed, with an estimated 10,000 more dying in prison without trial where most victims included royalists, clergy, and ordinary citizens across France. The Fall of Maximilien Robespierre (9 Thermidor) had marked the definitive end of the Reign of Terror and fundamentally shifted the course of the French Revolution, after a chaotic standoff at the Hôtel de Ville on 27 July 1794, during which Robespierre suffered a shattered jaw from a gunshot, he was arrested without trial, Robespierre and 21 of his closest allies were executed by guillotine, the following day at the Place de la Révolution.

== Southeast Asia ==
=== Ideological background ===
Saloth Sâr (Pol Pot) as the General Secretary of the Communist Party of Kampuchea (CPK)

Unlike The Communist Manifesto by Karl Marx and Friedrich Engels, the Khmer Rouge leadership (the "Paris Student Group") including Saloth Sâr ("Pol Pot") had found their ideological footing in France during their time there in Paris at the banks of the River Seine (October 1949 – December 1952) exposed them to a specific brand of Stalinism and Maoism through the French Communist Party, but they were also deeply enamoured with the Jacobin ideal of total societal transformation. Among these French ideals, Sâr was highly influenced by Jean-Jacques Rousseau. He left France in December 1952 aboard the ship from Marseille, which arrived and docked in Saigon as the primary port of French Indochina within 28 days later on 13 January 1953. Upon his return, he entered Cambodia immediately following his arrival in Saigon, which coincided a period of political turmoil under King Sihanouk to disband the National Assembly and began ruling by decree. Sâr had move to Phnom Penh to meet his fellow members of the Cercle Marxiste.

By August 1953, Sâr joined the Viet Minh (later known as the Viet Cong) to fight against French colonial rule. After Cambodia's independence from France on 9 November 1953, Saloth Sâr’s political ideology was deeply shaped by the radicalism of the French Revolutionary tradition, specifically the concept of "Year Zero" and the purge of the old order, by his version of "primitive communism" involved forcibly relocating urban dwellers ("New People") to the countryside to live and work alongside peasants ("Old People"). This was aimed at erasing class distinctions and returning Cambodian society to a basic, agrarian, and "untainted" existence.

=== Workers' Party of Kampuchea ===
Flag of the Communist Party of Kampuchea

Saloth Sâr and others met in September–October 1960 and established a new party, often referred to as the "Workers' Party of Kampuchea" (WPK). This was an underground, independent communist party separate from the previous pro-Vietnamese organization. After visiting Beijing and adopting a more radical Maoist ideology, the party was renamed the Communist Party of Kampuchea (CPK). This name change was kept secret from lower-ranking members and the public at the time. It refers to the Khmer people (Cambodia's dominant ethnic group) and Rouge (the French word for red), the international color of communism, now known as the Khmer Rouge, meaning "Cambodian Reds", during the Cambodian Civil War (1967–1975), the Khmer Rouge had received significant support from North Vietnam (led by Ho Chi Minh until 1969) and the Viet Cong as well as PAVN troops. The US-led Operation Menu bombings in eastern Cambodia, and the subsequent 1970 by the South Vietnamese incursion, the Communist Vietnamese forces moved deeper into Cambodia, bolstering the Khmer Rouge troops.

=== Burgeoning support for the Khmer Rouge ===
In March 1970, Sihanouk was deposed by Lon Nol, who established the pro-American Khmer Republic. Following Sihanouk's exile in Pyongyang and later Beijing, a coalition that significantly increased rural support for the communist insurgency. Also in 1970, Saloth Sâr adopted the pseudonym "Pol Pot", a name for "Politique Potentielle" as the contraction of French phrase, when he rose to power as the leader of the Khmer Rouge. Operation Chenla II became a major offensive by the Khmer Republic aimed at clearing Route 6 and reopening communications with Kompong Thom. Initially successful, it ended in a catastrophic defeat when the PAVN and Khmer Rouge counterattacked in late 1971, annihilating government forces and passing the strategic initiative to the communists.

An earlier, crucial victory for the Khmer Rouge at Kampot, where they captured the port city, signaling the declining military capability of the Khmer Republic in 1974. By early 1975, the capital was isolated and entirely dependent on US aerial resupply. The Khmer Rouge, having gained strength through Chinese support, systematically surrounded Phnom Penh, cutting it off from the rest of the country, preparing for the evacuation.

Following the U.S. withdrawal of combat troops in 1973, North Vietnam launched a final, massive offensive in March 1975, which caused a rapid collapse of the Army of the Republic of Vietnam (ARVN) in the Central Highlands and northern provinces. After the fall of the strategic town of Neak Luong on 1 April 1975, the southern approach to the capital was open. After the resignation of Lon Nol and a failed peace negotiation, he fled first to Indonesia, Hawaii and then Fullerton in California, the Khmer Rouge forces overran the last defenses of the capital. The Khmer Rouge finally entered and captured Phnom Penh on 17 April 1975 when Angkar (The Organization) came to power. Almost immediately, they ordered the total, forced evacuation of the city's two million residents into the countryside to begin their radical agrarian revolution of what will become known as "Year Zero". The ARVN 18th Division conducted a valiant final defense at Xuân Lộc, holding the North Vietnamese for 11 days before being overwhelmed on 21 April 1975. This victory allowed North Vietnamese forces to completely encircle Saigon.

=== Khmer Rouge's rise to power ===
Flag of Democratic Kampuchea

On 30 April 1975, North Vietnamese tanks crashed through the gates of the Presidential Palace. The South Vietnamese President Dương Văn Minh announced an unconditional surrender, as the Viet Cong troops had enter the city, marking the official end of the Vietnam War. When Pol Pot became General Secretary of the Communist Party of Kampuchea (CPK), the Khmer Rouge formally adopted the Constitution of Democratic Kampuchea on 5 January 1976, eight months after "Angkar" (The Organization) came to power.

The flag of Democratic Kampuchea (DK) had resembled to the Vietnamese flag, with the red background symbolized the revolutionary movement, the "resolute and valiant struggle of the Kampuchean people for the liberation, defense, and construction of their country" which has represented the bloodshed for the revolution, while the yellow three towered temple represented the national traditions of the Kampuchean people, specifically their efforts to build a prosperous nation. The choice of a simple, yellow emblem on a solid red field closely mirrored other communist banners of the era, such as Vietnam (a yellow star on red), reflecting the regional influence and alignment with the international communist movement which completely breaks away from the past, specifically both French colonialism and American imperialism, as the Khmer Rouge idealized the 12th-century Angkor Empire, once established by Jayavarman II, believed that if their ancestors could build the "stupendous marvel" of Angkor Wat, the new revolutionary people could achieve anything, as a peak of the Khmer achievement, intending to surpass it in building their new socialist society with Marxist-Leninist ideology of which Angkar had constructed one of the most radical and destructive ideologies by blending French Jacobinism, anti-colonial Asian Communism, and extreme Khmer nationalism: "If our people can build Angkor, they can achieve anything".

The city of Saigon (the former capital of South Vietnam) was officially renamed Ho Chi Minh City in honor of the late leader of the "Communist Party of Vietnam" (CPV). On 2 July 1976, North and South Vietnam were officially reunified to form the "Socialist Republic of Vietnam", establishing Hanoi as the capital of the unified nation, which was also part of a national holiday. The 1976 establishment of Democratic Kampuchea (DK), The Khmer Rouge's plan is to establish diplomatic ties with China and North Korea which maintained both strategic embassies only in Beijing and Pyongyang to balance an extreme isolationism. The North Korean leader Kim Il Sung provided "Pol Pot" with direct counsel on rural autarky and state-building, informed by his own "Juche" ideology as Pol Pot and high-ranking officials of the "Communist Party of Kampuchea" (CPK) visited Pyongyang regularly to study North Korea's military defense systems and collective agricultural structures. The Sino-Kampuchean bond was cemented during state visits to Beijing, where Pol Pot held critical meetings with Chairman Mao and Deng Xiaoping to discuss economic and military assistance ultimately dwarfed all other external aid combined as China provided vast shipments of weaponry and thousands of technical advisors to consolidate territorial control, North Korea offered direct counsel on rural autarky and state-building.

=== The establishment of Democratic Kampuchea ===
Emblem of Democratic Kampuchea

When the Chinese and North Korean delegations visited the deserted city of Phnom Penh after it was captured by Angkar ("The Organization") and the Khmer Rouge back in April 1975 after the Cambodian Civil War had ended, they were treated to meticulously staged tours of model cooperatives where the delegations were driven directly to highly curated, "model" agricultural communes in the surrounding countryside. These locations functioned as Potemkin villages: well-fed, carefully instructed workers were brought in to perform cheerful collective labor, fields were staged to look highly productive, and abundant food was displayed, as Pol Pot sought to implement an extreme, rapid agrarian revolution inspired by Chairman Mao's Great Leap Forward and the Cultural Revolution especially when it mirrors to Beijing's Red August which aimed to turn Cambodia into a closed, extreme totalitarian socialist society which became similar to Stalin’s USSR (Russia) which has rooted to Stalinism with Terror. Despite these nuanced differences in how they dealt with Cambodia, both Beijing and Pyongyang operated under the umbrella of "communist friendship" following the establishment of the Sino-Kampuchean bond that forged a unique, rigid, and ultimately tragic geopolitical triangle linking Beijing, Pyongyang, and Phnom Penh under the banner of communist friendship, Beijing served as the diplomatic bridge that introduced the secretive Phnom Penh regime to the global communist network while Pyongyang provided the Khmer Rouge with specialized training (particularly in agricultural and engineering sectors) and built a close diplomatic relationship which cultivate its deep ties with Democratic Kampuchea was a way to reinforce a secondary axis of militant. For both China and North Korea, maintaining a friendly regime in Cambodia was paramount in Southeast Asia as both nations viewed Democratic Kampuchea as an essential piece of the revolutionary puzzle. Angkar maintained close and formal diplomatic alliances with China and North Korea.

== See also ==
- Year Zero
- Year One (I) of the French Republican calendar
- Reign of Terror
- Revolutionary France
- Democratic Kampuchea (DK)
