= Cultural genocide =

Genocide involving destruction of culture

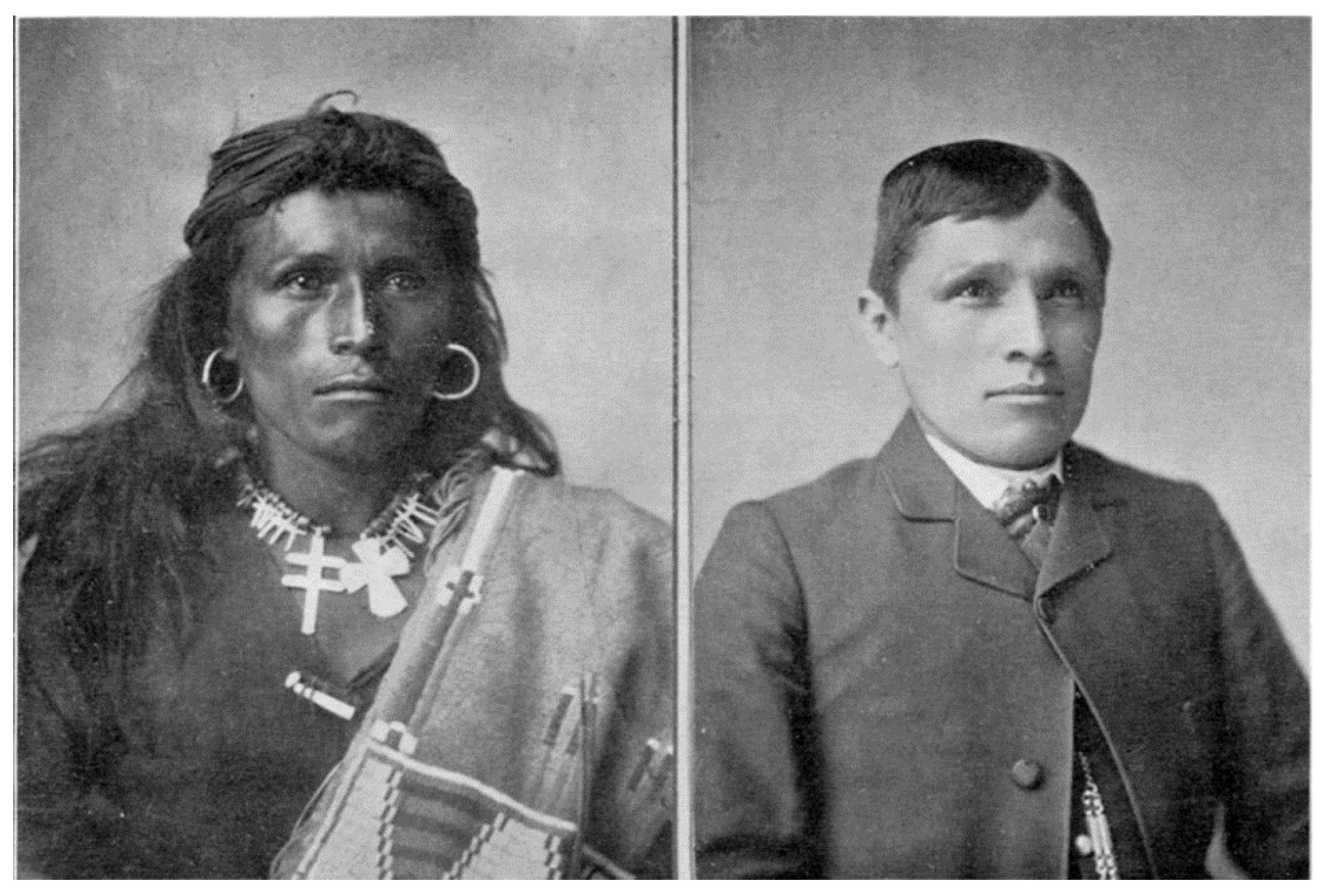
Tom Torlino, a Diné man of the Navajo Nation, entered the Carlisle Indian Industrial School in October 1882 at age 22 and departed in August 1885 at age 26. In the United States, boarding schools were used by both Christian missionaries and the federal government to assimilate Native Americans into white, Anglo-American culture. The Native American Rights Fund and Equal Justice Initiative both consider these assimilation efforts to amount to a cultural genocide of Native Americans.

Cultural genocide or culturicide is a concept first described by Polish lawyer Raphael Lemkin in 1944, in the same book that coined the term genocide. The destruction of culture was a central component in Lemkin's formulation of genocide. The precise definition of cultural genocide remains contested, and the United Nations does not include it in the definition of genocide used in the 1948 Genocide Convention. The Armenian Genocide Museum defines culturicide as "acts and measures undertaken to destroy nations' or ethnic groups' culture through spiritual, national, and cultural destruction", which appears to be essentially the same as ethnocide. Some ethnologists, such as Robert Jaulin, use the term ethnocide as a substitute for cultural genocide, although this usage has been criticized as risking the confusion between ethnicity and culture. Cultural genocide and ethnocide have in the past been used in distinct contexts. Cultural genocide without ethnocide is conceivable when a distinct ethnic identity is kept, but distinct cultural elements are eliminated.

Cultural genocide involves the eradication and destruction of cultural heritage, such as cultural artifacts, events, and books. The issue is addressed in multiple international treaties, including the Geneva Conventions and the Rome Statute, which define war crimes associated with the destruction of culture. Cultural genocide may also involve forced assimilation, as well as the suppression of a language or cultural activities that do not conform to the destroyer's notion of what is appropriate. Among many other potential reasons, cultural genocide may be committed for religious motives (e.g., iconoclasm which is based on aniconism); as part of a campaign of ethnic cleansing in an attempt to remove the evidence of a people from a specific locale or history; as part of an effort to implement a Year Zero, in which the past and its associated culture is deleted and history is "reset". The drafters of the 1948 Genocide Convention initially considered using the term, but later dropped it from inclusion. The term "cultural genocide" has been considered in various draft United Nations declarations, but it is not used by the UN Genocide Convention.

== History ==
=== Etymology ===
The notion of 'cultural genocide' was acknowledged as early as 1944, when lawyer Raphael Lemkin distinguished a cultural component of genocide. In 1989, Robert Badinter, a French criminal lawyer known for his stance against the death penalty, used the term "cultural genocide" on a television show to describe what he said was the disappearance of Tibetan culture in the presence of the 14th Dalai Lama. The Dalai Lama would later use the term in 1993 and again in 2008.

=== United Nations proposals ===
The concept of cultural genocide was originally included in drafts of the 1948 Genocide Convention. Genocide was defined as the destruction of a group's language, religion, or culture through one of several methods. This definition of genocide was rejected by the drafting committee by a vote of 25 to 16, with 4 abstentions.

Article 7 of a 1994 draft of the United Nations Declaration on the Rights of Indigenous Peoples (DRIP) uses the phrase "cultural genocide" but does not define what it means. The complete article in the draft read as follows:

Indigenous peoples have the collective and individual right not to be subjected to ethnocide and cultural genocide, including prevention of and redress for:

(a) Any action which has the aim or effect of depriving them of their integrity as distinct peoples, or of their cultural values or ethnic identities;
(b) Any action which has the aim or effect of dispossessing them of their lands, territories or resources;
(c) Any form of population transfer which has the aim or effect of violating or undermining any of their rights;
(d) Any form of assimilation or integration by other cultures or ways of life imposed on them by legislative, administrative or other measures;
(e) Any form of propaganda directed against them.

This wording only ever appeared in a draft. The DRIP—which was adopted by the United Nations General Assembly during its 62nd session at UN Headquarters in New York City on 13 September 2007—only makes reference to genocide once, when it mentions "genocide, or any other act of violence" in Article 7. Though the concept of "ethnocide" and "cultural genocide" was removed in the version adopted by the General Assembly, the sub-points from the draft noted above were retained (with slightly expanded wording) in Article 8 that speaks to "the right not to be subject to forced assimilation."

== Relation to genocide ==
The United Nations does not include cultural genocide in the definition of genocide used in the 1948 Genocide Convention:

The definition contained in Article II of the Convention describes genocide as a crime committed with the intent to destroy a national, ethnic, racial or religious group, in whole or in part. It does not include political groups or so called "cultural genocide". This definition was the result of a negotiating process and reflects the compromise reached among United Nations Member States while drafting the Convention in 1948...To constitute genocide, there must be a proven intent on the part of perpetrators to physically destroy [the] group. Cultural destruction does not suffice, nor does an intention to simply disperse a group, though this may constitute a crime against humanity as set out in the Rome Statute. It is this special intent, or dolus specialis, that makes the crime of genocide so unique.

While not qualifying as genocide under the convention, the issue is addressed in multiple international treaties, including the Geneva Conventions and the Rome Statute, which define war crimes associated with the destruction of culture.

== List of cultural genocides ==
The term has been used to describe the destruction of cultural heritage in connection with various events which mostly occurred during the 20th century:

=== Europe ===
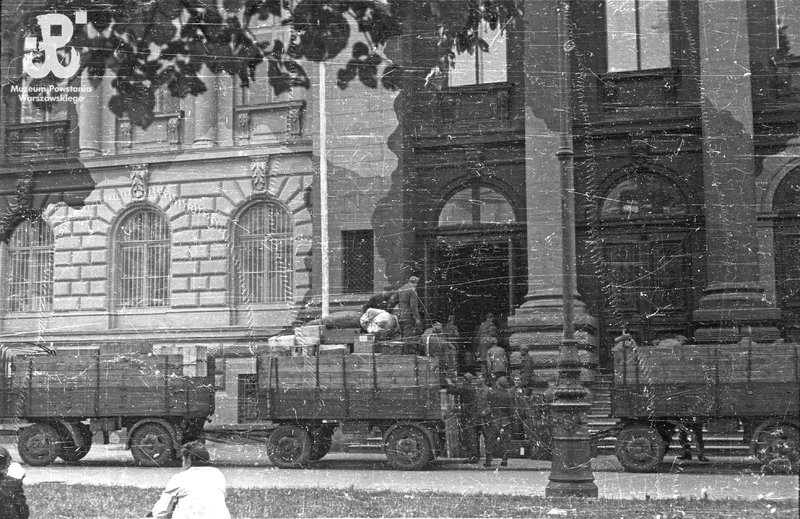
- Looting of Polish artwork at the Zachęta building by German forces during the Occupation of Poland, 1944
  Historian Stephen Wheatcroft states that the Soviet peasantry was subject to cultural destruction during the creation of the "New Soviet man", Lynne Viola makes a similar characterization of Collectivization in the Soviet Union adding a noted colonial character to the project in their observation of the event.
- During the Deportation of the Chechens and Ingush in 1944, Soviet forces destroyed almost every piece of Chechen and Ingush language literature in existence, and damaged or destroyed many Chechen and Ingush cultural sites and artifacts, including towers in the highlands that had been built to resist Mongol invasions in the 13th century. Chechens and Ingush gravestones were destroyed, and when the Chechens and Ingush were allowed to return to their homes a decade later, they were forbidden from settling in their ancestral mountain lands. There is no historical consensus on whether the deportations constitute genocide or ethnic cleansing
- In reference to the Axis powers (primarily, Nazi Germany)'s policies towards some nations during World War II (ex. the German occupation of Poland & the destruction of Polish culture).
- Nazi forces committed cultural genocide against Serbian cultural treasures during the Invasion of Yugoslavia in 1941. On Hitler's direct order, the National Library in Belgrade was bombed and thousands of valuable documents were burned. Many other cultural institutions and monuments were looted.
- In the Bosnian War during the Siege of Sarajevo, cultural genocide was committed by Bosnian Serb forces. The National and University Library of Bosnia and Herzegovina was specifically targeted and besieged by cannons positioned all around the city. The National Library was completely destroyed in the fire, along with 80 per cent of its contents. Some 3 million books were destroyed, along with hundreds of original documents from the Ottoman Empire and the Austro-Hungarian monarchy.
- 2004 unrest in Kosovo. In an urgent appeal, issued on 18 March by the extraordinary session of the Expanded Convocation of the Holy Synod of Serbian Orthodox Church (SPC), it was reported that a number of Serbian churches and shrines in Kosovo had been damaged or destroyed by Albanian rioters. At least 30 sites were completely destroyed, more or less destroyed, or further destroyed (sites that had been previously damaged).
- After the Greek Civil War, Greek authorities had conducted a cultural genocide upon Slavic Macedonians in Northern Greece through prohibition of communication in Slavic languages, renaming of cities, towns and villages (Lerin/Лерин to Florina etc.), deportation of Slavic Macedonians, particularly women and children, as well as many other actions intended to marginalize and oppress the Slavic Macedonians residing in Northern Greece. While some of these actions had been motivated by political ideology, as many of the Slavic Macedonians had sided with the defeated communists, the majority of actions were committed to wipe out any traces of Slavic Macedonians or their culture in Northern Greece.
- Turkey: Especially in the island of Imbros. The island was primarily inhabited by ethnic Greeks from antiquity until approximately the 1960s, when many were forced to flee due to a campaign of cultural genocide and discrimination enacted by the Turkish government. Massive scale persecution against the local Greeks started in 1961, as part of the Eritme Programmi operation that aimed at the elimination of Greek education and the enforcement of economic, psychological pressure and violence. Under these conditions, the Turkish government approved the appropriation of >90% of the cultivated areas of the island and the settlement of additional 6,000 ethnic Turks from mainland Turkey. Finally, the island was also officially renamed by Turkey in 1970 to Gökçeada to finalize the removal of any remaining Greek influence.
- Francoist Spain: the prohibition of the use of minority languages such as Catalan or Galician in the public space, from schools to shops, public transport, or even in the streets, the banning of the use of Catalan or Galician birth names for children, the renaming of cities, streets and all toponyms from Catalan, Basque or Galician to Castilian-Spanish, and the abolition of government and all cultural institutions in Catalonia, Valencia and the Balearic Islands as well as in Basque Country and Galicia with the goal of total cultural suppression and assimilation.
  - John D. Hargreaves writes that "A policy of cultural genocide was implemented: the Catalan language and key symbols of Catalan independent identity and nationhood, such as the flag (the senyera), the national hymn ('Els Segadors') and the national dance (the sardana), were proscribed. Any sign of independence or opposition, in fact, was brutally suppressed. Catalan identity and consequently the Catalan nation were threatened with extinction."
  - Although Josep Pla and other Catalan authors published books in Catalan in the 1950s, and even there were prizes of Catalan Literature during Francoism like the Premi Sant Jordi de novel·la, editorial production in Catalan never recovered the peak levels it had reached before Spanish Civil War. A prominent case of popularization of Catalan was Joan Manuel Serrat: although he could compose Catalan songs and gained certain notoriety, he was not allowed to sing in Catalan in the Eurovision contest its La, la, la theme, and was replaced by Spanish singer Massiel, who won the Eurovision contest. Overall, despite some tolerance as Franco's regime relaxed in the late 60s and early 70s, Catalan and the rest of minority languages of Spain were strictly banned from higher education, administration and all official endeavors, thus being in practice confined to the private sphere and domestic uses (see Language policies of Francoist Spain).
- During the 19th and early 20th centuries, some schools in Wales adopted the Welsh Not policy to discourage students from speaking Welsh instead of English. Under this total immersion policy, students caught speaking Welsh were punished, most typically by having a lump of wood with the letters "WN" placed around their neck. Though the policy enjoyed widespread support among parents and the general public in Wales, some Welsh nationalists have described it as an example of cultural genocide. Academic Martin Johnes noted that despite the Welsh Not not being an official state policy, instead coming down to actions taken by individual teachers, it nonetheless remains "a powerful symbol of the oppression of Welsh culture."
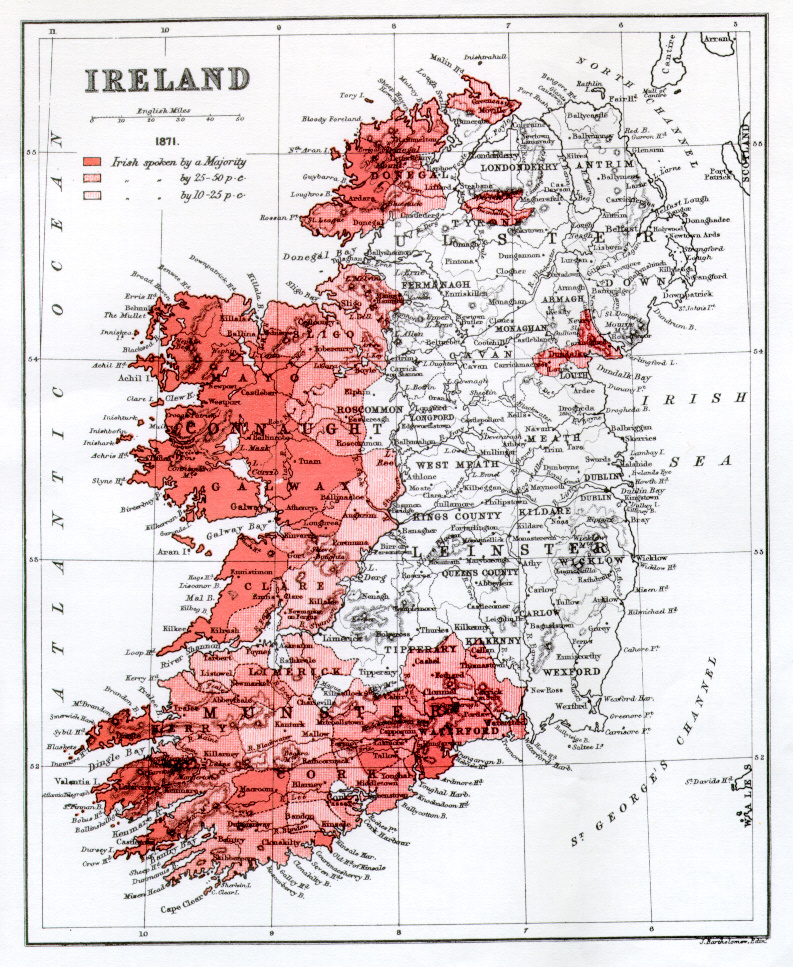
- Map showing the distribution of the Irish language in 1871
  Numerous academics have argued Ireland was subject to cultural genocide under British rule, specifically focusing on attempts to suppress the Irish language, the culture of Ireland and the Catholic Church in Ireland. Academics Paul Bartrop, Tomás Mac Síomóin and Christopher Murray claimed that attempts to suppress the Irish language by the Dublin Castle administration amounted to a cultural genocide, and scholar Hilary Carey argued that the penal transportation of Irish convicts to Australia was also a cultural genocide.
- France's policies (also known as Vergonha, "shame," in Occitan) towards its various regional and minority languages, referring to non-standard French as patois, have been described as genocide by professor of Catalan philology at the University of the Balearic Islands Jaume Corbera i Pou who argues, As quoted, "when at the mid-19th century, primary school is made compulsory all across the State, it is also made clear that only French will be taught, and the teachers will severely punish any pupil speaking in patois. The aim of the French educational system will consequently not be to dignify the pupils' natural humanity, developing their culture and teaching them to write their language, but rather to humiliate them and morally degrade them for the simple fact of being what tradition and their nature made them. The self-proclaimed country of the "human rights" will then ignore one of man's most fundamental rights, the right to be himself and speak the language of his nation. And with that attitude France, the "grande France" that calls itself the champion of liberty, will pass the 20th century, indifferent to the timid protest movements of the various linguistic communities it submitted and the literary prestige they may have given birth to ... France, that under Franco's reign was seen here [in Catalonia] as the safe haven of freedom, has the miserable honour of being the [only] State of Europe—and probably the world – that succeeded best in the diabolical task of destroying its own ethnic and linguistic patrimony and moreover, of destroying human family bonds: many parents and children, or grandparents and grandchildren, have different languages, and the latter feel ashamed of the first because they speak a despicable patois, and no element of the grandparents' culture has been transmitted to the younger generation, as if they were born out of a completely new world. This is the French State that has just entered the 21st century, a country where stone monuments and natural landscapes are preserved and respected, but where many centuries of popular creation expressed in different tongues are on the brink of extinction. The "gloire" and the "grandeur" built on a genocide. No liberty, no equality, no fraternity: just cultural extermination, this is the real motto of the French Republic."
- Scandinavia: Throughout the 19th and 20th centuries, Norway and Sweden pursued assimilationist policies directed towards Sámi aiming to integrate the indigenous populations into each respective country's language and cultural traditions.
- Ukraine. As of 29 February 2024, according to the published data of the Prime Minister of Ukraine, Denys Shmyhal, about 900 objects of national heritage were damaged or destroyed in the occupied zones of Ukraine, and more than 20 thousand cultural monuments are under occupation. The Russian government officially frames its military presence and subsequent territorial claims in Ukraine as the "liberation" of historically Russian lands and Russian-speaking majorities from what it characterizes as an illegal Ukrainian administration.

=== Asia ===
==== The Middle East ====
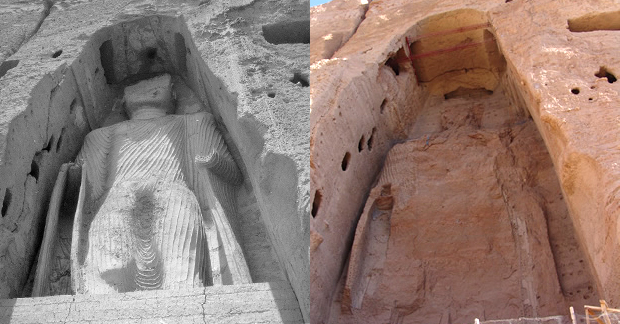
- Before and after photographs of the destruction of one of the Buddhas of Bamiyan that were destroyed by the Taliban regime in Afghanistan in 2001.
  Azerbaijan: Azerbaijan's destruction, appropriation, and denial of Armenian heritage sites in Nakhchivan and Nagorno-Karabakh have been characterized as ethnocide or cultural genocide and condemned by the International Court of Justice and European Parliament. The destruction of thousands of medieval Armenian Churches, khachkars and gravestones at the Armenian cemetery in Julfa is a prominent example. Armenians under the Azeri Soviet Government were suppressed in developing their own language and culture. Many Armenian churches, cemeteries, and schools were closed or destroyed, clerics were arrested, and textbooks on Armenian history were banned. The Armenian schools which did exist were administered by the Azeri Ministry of Education where none of the staff spoke Armenian and which prohibited teaching Armenian history, and using Armenian books and journals. Armenian teachers in Nagorno-Karabakh were restricted to training in Nagorno-Karabakh, leading to differing historical interpretations in their educational curriculum compared to Armenia. Additionally, limited Armenian language television was available. The 1981 "law of the NKAR" denied additional rights, restricted cultural connections between Nagorno-Karabakh and Armenia, and removed provisions that had explicitly listed Armenian as a working language to be used by local authorities. The historian Christopher J Walker describes the exodus of many Armenians from the region as "not a matter of chance, but is due to the persistent policy of Baku, whose aim is to 'Nakhichevanize' the territory, to de-Armenize it, first culturally and then physically." In the 1960s, 1970s, and 1980s, Armenians protested the cultural and economic marginalization they faced in the region.
- Bangladesh: The persecution of Bengali Hindus during the Partition of India and 1971 Independence war of Bangladesh was a campaign of ethnic cleansing which was sponsored by the government of Pakistan.
- Iran: persecution of Baháʼís in Iran by Muslims as a case of religious persecution has been called a cultural genocide.
- Iraq: Islamic State of Iraq and the Levant's forcible conversions in its territory as well as its destruction of ancient Assyrian, Roman, Yazidi and Christian heritage sites and museums.
- Kazakhstan: Historian Sarah Cameron believes that while the Kazakh famine of 1931–1933 combined with a campaign against nomads was not genocide in the sense of the Genocide Convention's definition, it complies with Raphael Lemkin's original concept of genocide, which considered destruction of culture to be as genocidal as physical annihilation.
- Turkey: Damage to cultural sites occurring during the genocide of the Armenian population under the Ottoman Empire during World War I, which the Turkish historical narrative attributes to wartime conditions, neglect, and collateral conflict, alongside ongoing initiatives by the Republic of Turkey to renovate and maintain historical Armenian monuments.
- Israel: Destruction of cultural heritage through the damage and destruction of museums and ancient, historical structures since 2023, such as the Al Qarara Cultural Museum and the Great Mosque of Gaza.

==== East Asia ====
- China:
  - Tibet: Sinicization of Tibet from the 1950s onwards. Following the 1959 Tibetan uprising, 97% of Tibet's monasteries were destroyed, while 2 million Tibetans, including 500,000 nomadic farmers, were relocated to newly created urban centers.
  - Xinjiang: The persecution of Uyghurs in China. Some one million members of China's Muslim Uyghur minority were detained in detention camps, termed "reeducation camps", which exist for the purpose of changing the political thinking, identities and religious beliefs of the detainees, which the Chinese government attributed to anti-terrorism efforts. Satellite evidence suggests that China has also razed more than two dozen Uyghur Muslim religious sites to the ground.
- Japan:
  - Japanese occupation of Korea. Japan's extensive policy of cultural genocide included forcibly changing Korean names to Japanese names, the exclusive use of the Japanese language, school instruction in the Japanese "ethical system", and Shinto worship.
  - The Japanese ban and discrimination which the Ainu and Ryukyuan cultures have been subjected to as well as other regional cultures.
  - The Japanese “Haibutsu Kishaku” movement which Buddhist temples being closed or demolished, and countless Buddhist artifacts being destroyed.

==== South/Southeast Asia ====
- Cambodia: Democratic Kampuchea under the rule of Angkar (The Organization) and its radical extreme Maoist policy, known as "Year Zero", which divided and categorized the population as New People (urban backgrounds) and "Old People" (rural areas) as they become April 17th people, both the Vietnamese Cambodians and Cham Cambodians were targeted for purging, which forbade the use of their languages and practice of their traditional faiths by the Khmer Rouge ("Cambodian Reds"), following the Fall of Phnom Penh at the end of the Cambodian Civil War.
- Sri Lanka: The persecution of Sri Lankan Tamils during the Sri Lankan civil war was a campaign of ethnic cleansing which was sponsored by the government and it has continued until the present day as a part of the Sinhalisation of the northern and eastern parts of the island.

=== Africa ===
- Ethiopia: Policies enforcing the Amharic language on the indigenous Tigrayan population have been described as "linguistic genocide".
- Somaliland: The marginalization and forcible assimilation of the Gabooye community in Somaliland has been described as culturecide.
- Sudan: During the regime of Omar al-Bashir, the Sudanese government engaged in a campaign in order to culturally eliminate the Nilotic-speaking peoples, including through linguistic suppression, as well as the creation of the Jonglei Canal in order to weaken southern pastures and force Nilotics north.

=== Oceania ===
- Australia - native people: The Stolen Generations in Australia where half-caste children were removed from their families by Christian missionaries led government supported policies to convert them to Christianity under so-called program to civilise [forced Christianisation] the natives. See also genocide of Indigenous Australians by Christians.
- New Zealand: The loss of the Maori language due to the education system, as well as the forcible transfer of Maori children, has been described as a genocide or cultural genocide.
- USA - Hawaii: In the year 1896, the United States enacted a law in Hawaii that made the use of the English language compulsory in schools, which led to the decline of the use of the Hawaiian language in Hawaii.
- West Papua: The consequences of the occupation of West Papua by Indonesia have been described as both physical and cultural genocide, with the indigenous Melanesian population facing cultural destruction, language extinction, displacement, and environmental destruction.

=== North America ===
- Taíno genocide.
  - In December 1492, Christopher Columbus landed on the island of Hispaniola in what is now known as Haiti, which he named the island "La Isla Española" meaning Little Spain, Columbus also founded La Navidad as the first European colony in the Americas soon after the Spanish landed in the island of "Ayiti". In 1493, the Spanish forced the Taíno to convert to Christianity and suppressed their indigenous religious beliefs and rituals involving the worship of spirits known as zemis, as the Spanish used systematic violence, slavery, and other brutalities were aimed not only at the physical elimination of the Taíno population but also at the destruction of their cultural identity, beliefs, and way of life on the island that has caused by massacres, forced labor in gold mines, and mass starvation as well as the destruction of social structure and customs. With the Spanish exploiting and controlling the remaining indigenous people by severing their ties to their heritage as many Taino people of all ages died in Hispaniola due to a combination of factors including forced labor, disease, and massacres following the arrival of Christopher Columbus and the Spanish colonists. Within three decades of European contact, 70-85% of the Taino population perished from diseases to which they had no immunity, and continued harsh treatment and slavery under the Spanish encomienda system further decimated their numbers, leading to their near extinction by the mid-16th century in 1550.
- Indigenous peoples in the United States.
  - Scholars have coined the term cultural suicide for cases in which Indigenous peoples were coerced into a nominally voluntary abandonment of cultural and religious traditions in return for necessary military aid from colonial powers, such as the early 1700 alliance between the Spanish and Seminole that included the baptism of natives as a term.
  - The outright Cultural assimilation of Native Americans began soon after the American Revolutionary War, with proponents including George Washington and Henry Knox
  - In the mid-1800s to early 1900s, the United States established American Indian boarding schools to assimilate Native American children and youth into Euro-American culture.
- Spanish colonization of the Americas and Yaqui Wars.
  - According to historians and biographers, the Spanish conquest of the Aztec Empire resulted in the destruction of Aztec culture and the imposition of Spanish culture, it's a complex issue, and whether it constitutes cultural genocide is a matter of ongoing debate and interpretation. Several books written by the Aztecs were burnt by Spanish conquistadors and priests during the Spanish conquest of Yucatán. Despite opposition from Catholic friar Bartolomé de las Casas, numerous books found by the Spanish in Yucatán were burnt on the order of Bishop Diego de Landa in 1562. Landa was then condemned in Spain by the Council of the Indies, which in 1543 had expressly forbidden Inquisitorial methods in New Spain. Later, however, an investigation by crown authorities exonerated Landa, and he was appointed bishop of Yucatán in 1572.
  - The Mexican government under the rule of Porfirio Diaz as a dictator who commit Yaqui genocide against the Yaqui tribes who led an uprising against the regime with 5,000 had been sold into slavery and forced to work with physical hard labor until they died of illness, exhaustion and/or starvation.
- Canadian genocide of Indigenous peoples.
  - The Indian Residential Schools Truth and Reconciliation Commission of Canada concluded that the Canadian Indian residential school system "can best be described as 'cultural genocide.'"
  - In 2015, Chief Justice Beverly McLachlin, of the Supreme Court of Canada, stated in a speech to the Global Centre for Pluralism that Canada's historical treatment of Indigenous peoples was an attempt at cultural genocide, and "the worst stain on Canada's human-rights record."

== See also ==
- Cultural assimilation – Adoption of features of another culture
- Cultural bereavement – Grief for loss of culture
- Cultural loss – Erosion of cultural practices or beliefs
- Cultural imperialism – Cultural aspects of imperialism
- Cultural racism – Alleged type of racism that discriminates people for being culturally different
- Ethnic cleansing – Systematic removal of a certain ethnic or religious group
- Ethnic conflict – Conflict between ethnic groups
- Ethnocentrism – Judging another culture by the values and standards of one's own culture
- Ethnocide – Extermination of ethnic identities
- Forced assimilation – Involuntary cultural assimilation of minority groups
- Language death – Process in which a language loses all its native speakers
- Linguistic discrimination – Discrimination on the basis of language of an individual
- List of genocides
- Policide – Intentional destruction of an independent political and social entity
- Population transfer – Movement of a large group of people from one region to another
- Religious discrimination – Treating a person or group differently because of their religious beliefs
- Religious persecution – Persecution based on religious belief
