= Laos–Thailand relations =

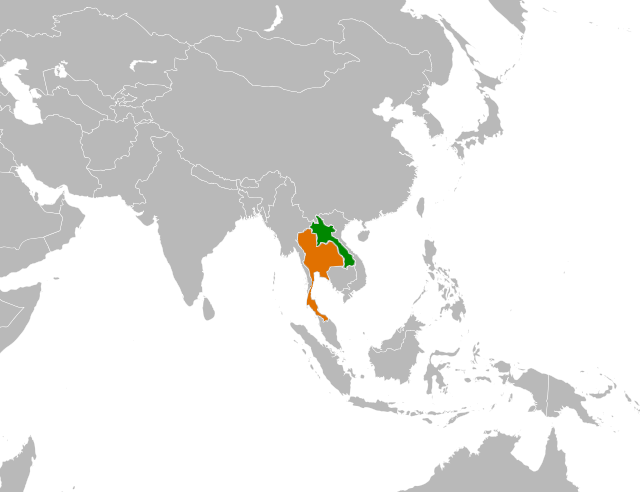
- Laos: Thailand

Laos and Thailand have had bilateral relations since the time of their precursor Lan Xang and Ayutthaya kingdoms in the 15th century. The two countries share a border and express linguistic and cultural similarities. The Lao kingdom of Lan Xang included all of northeastern Thailand as recently as the early 18th century. Thailand's northeastern region, Isan, has particularly strong Lao roots. Linguistically, the inhabitants of Isan, a third of the Thai population, speak the Isan language, a Lao dialect. Diplomacy has concentrated on the Mekong River, seeking to make it a "river of true peace and friendship", as made explicit in statements by both respective prime ministers in 1976, and was deeply contrasted of Angkar's Democratic Kampuchea.

Diplomatic relations between the modern states were established in 1950, but cross-border cooperation began at the end of the Cold War in the late 1980s and early 1990s.

== History ==
=== 1867–1980 ===
France and Siam signed a treaty on 15 July 1867 once preceded an effort to establish a French protectorate of Cambodia, the territorial disputes of Indochinese peninsula for the expansion of French Indochina which led the Incident of Rattanakosin Era 112. The Siamese agreed to cede Laos to France on 3 October 1893 as part of French Indochina with the Treaty of Peace and Convention in Bangkok, which was ratified on February 2, 1894. The treaty established the Mekong as the frontier between the two countries between the French explorer Auguste Pavie and King Rama V of Siam. During World War II, Laos was invaded and controlled by Vichy France, Thailand, Imperial Japan and Free France which led the Surrender of Japan in French Indochina following the two Atomic bombs of Hiroshima and Nagasaki in August 1945. Laos obtained independence in 1949 and has completed independence from France on 22 October 1953, followed by Cambodia on 9 November. Kaysone Phomvihane, the leader of Lao People's Revolutionary Party joined Pathet Lao as of Marxist-Leninist movement. Saloth Sâr ("Pol Pot", a French pseudonym as Politique Potentielle), who was once educated in Paris, France to join the French Communist Party from 1 October 1949 to 13 January 1953. He established a new communist party as the "Workers' Party of Kampuchea" in 1960, later renamed as the "Communist Party of Kampuchea" in 1966, which led the beginning of the Cambodian Civil War in 1967. The Khmer Rouge ("Cambodian Reds") ideology combined elements of communism, heavily influenced by Maoism, with a strong form of Khmer nationalism. In 1970, Sihanouk was overthrown by the United States-led Khmer Republic during the coup of Lon Nol. By 1971, Angkar had launched a military operation as Chenla II supported by the Viet Cong and the North Vietnamese. By 1974, Angkar and the Khmer Rouge had captured the city of Kampot against Lon Nol's Khmer Republic government. Both Laotian and Cambodian communists on the orders of Chairman Mao and the People's Liberation Army to overthrow not just Sihanouk or Lon Nol of the Khmer Republic, but King Sisavang Vatthana and the Royal Family of Laos which is until the fall of Vientiane during the Laotian Civil War on 2 December 1975 as the Royal Lao Army surrendered to Pathet Lao after long years of civil war defeating the American imperialism, especially eight months after the Fall of Phnom Penh that surrendered to the Khmer Rouge and the beginning of Year Zero. On 5 January 1976, Cambodia has been proclaimed and constituted as Democratic Kampuchea which had very close ties with China and North Korea as a special relationship between the two countries.

In 1975, following the proclamation of Lao People's Democratic Republic, the Royal Lao Government disbanded as the country became one-party Marxist–Leninist state, behind Maoist government backings of the PRC had re-established relations a complex relationship with Laos that includes economic, political, and military cooperation after the death of Mao Zedong in September 1976. Both Thailand and Laos try to avoid each other, other than to keep open communication for economic and environmental reasons. The royals were taken to re-education camp called Camp Number One in Xam Neua where they are forced to do hard labor which led the King in 1980, the queen Khamphoui in 1982 and Vatthana all died of starvation in the camp. Thailand sealed its long river border with Laos in 1980, were driven by the border skirmishes and blockades due to heightening regional tensions following Vietnam's reunification from Saigon as "Ho Chi Minh City", once became the French colonial center of Cochinchina in the Southern region.

=== 1980– ===
In 1980, a minor incident involving live fire between patrol boats led Thailand to close its border with Laos. More significant border disputes and military clashes followed in 1984 and 1987 in Sainyabuli Province. These conflicts originated in rival claims to forest resources based on maps from the early days of the French protectorate.

In 1988, Thai prime minister Chatichai Choonhavan opened the Indochina market, leading to a wave of goodwill gestures and business ventures between Laos and Thailand. Kaysone Phomvihan paid an official visit to Bangkok in 1989, his first since the brief 1979 rapprochement with Prime Minister General Kriangsak Chomanand. These gestures were followed by official visits from Princess Sirindhorn in March 1990 and Crown Prince Maha Vajiralongkorn in June 1992. As another gesture of goodwill in 1992 the Politburo removed from power military commander Army Chief of Staff General Sisavath Keobounphanh. While Keobounphanh had dealt closely and effectively with the Thai military command in restoring neighborly relations, his party colleagues accused him of personal corruption. This corruption of a senior party leader symbolized the fear among some Laotian leaders that the more prosperous Thais, "want to eat us".

Two political issues between Laos and Thailand delayed rapprochement during the 1980s. One was an influx of Laotian migrants and refugees, whom Thailand saw as undesirable minority groups and refused to accept as immigrants. A related issue stemmed from the presence of Laotian and Hmong resistance groups using migrant camps as bases. The Hmong constituted approximately half of those living in the camps and tended to face lower chances of deportation, in part due to fear of reprisal and hope for national autonomy. Thailand officially announced its stance in July 1992. However, Laotian refugees who had not returned home or found third-country resettlement by 1995 would be classified as illegal immigrants and face deportation.

Lao and Hmong resistance movements have persisted since 1975, but with the end of the Cold War, attempts to disrupt the LPDR and its Vietnamese military partners dwindled. The Ministry of Foreign Affairs continued to press the Thai military command to live up to its March 1991 agreement to disarm rebels and discourage Laotian sabotage operations. At the same time, Thailand made very clear its unwillingness to assimilate the Hmong refugees.

The threat of a return of Vietnamese troops cautioned the Thai military, who preferred keeping Laos as a buffer state rather than a military line of contact with the Vietnamese. The Friendship Bridge could open the interior to more foreign trucking and commerce and make any foreign military presence in Laos more apparent.

In December 2009, Thai soldiers evicted more than 4,000 Hmong asylum seekers from a holding center and deported them to Laos. This action was criticized by Human Rights Watch and the US State Department.

Despite their shared cuisine, language and border, scholars have noted that anti-communist ideology after the 1950s encouraged the idea of "Thainess", and a persistent belief in Thai superiority, leading "the population of central and southern Thailand [to] look to their northern borders with contempt". Thamrongsak Petchlertanan, a historian at Rangsit University, claimed that the notion of Thai superiority is rooted in decades of nationalist education in Thai schools. The destruction of Vientiane by the Siamese army in 1778, for instance, is part of this narrative and has been proudly recounted to generations of Thai children.

=== Anti-Thai sentiment in Laos ===
Relations between Laos and Thailand have been characterized by tension. Since ancient times, Laos opposed Siamese territorial expansion. Laotian surrogate rulers requested French colonial authorities of French Indochina to ask France to reclaim lost Lao territory on the Khorat Plateau and to reclaim the Emerald Buddha from Siam. After achieving independence under a Communist rule, the present Laotian government has been pro-Vietnam. Thailand's influence is suspect in the views of the pro-socialist Laotian community.

== Mutual assistance ==
In 2012, the Thai government agreed to provide loan assistance to Laos for two infrastructure projects. The first loan of more than 718 million baht funded the construction of a 33 km (21 mi) road, that would be built from Phudu checkpoint in Thailand's Uttaradit Province to Parklai District in Sainyabuli Province, Laos. The second loan of more than 84 million Thai baht funded the second phase of development of Pakse Airport in Champasak Province.

In October 2011, the Lao government presented 1.5 million baht to the Thai government as a gesture of solidarity with the victims of flooding in Thailand's central region.

== State visits ==
Thai Prime Minister Abhisit Vejjajiva visited Laos in December 2010 as part of the 60 year anniversary of relations between the two countries. He stated that it was "Thai government's policy to encourage the private sector and state enterprises to invest in Lao PDR while enhancing corporate social responsibility, which renders benefits to local communities and protects the environment at the same time".

On 31 May 2012, Lao Prime Minister Thongsing Thammavong visited his Thai counterpart, Yingluck Shinawatra.

== Economic relations ==
Much of the Lao hydropower generated from dams on the Mekong and its tributaries has been exported to Thailand, which has benefited from the hydropower in developing its poorer areas, especially in Thailand's northeast. Selling hydropower has brought in significant foreign exchange to Laos.

== See also ==
- France–Thailand relations
- Anti-Thai sentiment
- Laos–Thailand border
- Thaification
- Kra–Dai languages
