= 1977 in Cambodia =

- Decades: 1950s; 1960s; 1970s; 1980s; 1990s
- See also: Other events of 1977; List of years in Cambodia

The following lists events that happened during 1977 in Cambodia.

== Incumbents ==
- President: Khieu Samphan
- Prime Minister: Pol Pot

== Events ==
=== January ===
- January 6 - The first anniversary of the establishment of Democratic Kampuchea as the totalitarian society since the Fall of Phnom Penh after the Cambodian Civil War had ended, China and North Korea provided a significant support to Angkar and the Khmer Rouge, with China as the main backer while North Korea became lesser extent by its diplomatic relations with a very strong support of Communist allies who learned the same lines with Marxist–Leninist ideology in the Far East.

=== February ===
- February 17 - The French newspaper Le Monde reported that the Khmer Rouge had systematically executed all officials from the previous government by the ruling Maoist entity of Angkar Padevat (The Revolutionary Organization), both the flags of Democratic Kampuchea and Vietnam share a common Marxist–Leninist aesthetic, with both relying on a bold red background to symbolize the revolution and the struggles for national liberation, the yellow silhouette of a three-towered temple represented Kampuchean tradition and agricultural prosperity by the representative of the ancient Angkor Wat adapted by the Khmer Rouge guerrillas in the 1950s before it was constituted to become a new state flag on 5 January 1976 as part of socialist movement, blood, and the resolute struggle of the Kampuchean people for liberation and state-building to evoke the idea that the "new" revolutionary people of Cambodia could rebuild a powerful medieval state, it remains unique among communist state flags for featuring a national/religious heritage monument instead of a star or a hammer and sickle that was used by Stalin and Mao.

=== March ===
- March 30 - The Cambodian government under Pol Pot as Brother Number One has officially rejected attempts by the United States and France (former French colony as part of Indochina) to open discussions between the two diplomatic relations.

=== April ===
- April 17 - Pol Pot and his comrades had attended the second anniversary of the Fall of Phnom Penh against Lon Nol's government of the Khmer Republic and declaring a new policy called 1975 Year Zero which hastened its isolation from the rest of the world that became Southeast Asia's secretive state as Cambodia became a closed nation followed by Kim Il Sung's North Korea which revealed that "Angkar" as the secretive body exercising supreme power was known as Marxist–Leninist organization by the Communist Party of Kampuchea (CPK) of which both Pyongyang and Beijing had trained the Khmer Rouge soldiers on its soil, stationed military advisors supplied with aid by the foreign backers to support the army and people from Deng Xiaoping.
