= Les Vraies Richesses =

1937 book by Jean Giono

- Author: Jean Giono
- Language: French
- Publisher: Éditions Grasset
- Publication date: 1937
- Publication place: France
- Pages: 220

Les Vraies Richesses (lit. 'The True Wealth'; Occitan: La Veritable Riquesa) is a 1937 book by the French writer Jean Giono. It is a celebration of the countryside, especially in the author's native Provence, which is contrasted with the city.

== Background ==
The writer Jean Giono had a breakthrough in the early 1930s with novels about the peasant population of his native Provence. He was displeased with city life and with machine society, which he linked to warfare. On 1 September 1935, Giono and a few other authors moved to a secluded area in the mountains near Manosque. The aim was to live close to nature, which Giono viewed as an extension of the human rather than a place for Romantic refuge.

== Synopsis ==
In Les Vraies Richesses, Giono lays out his personal worldview and how it has developed, from his rejection of Christianity's renunciation of the body and his view of man as a "cosmic element" among others. Starting with a walk through Belleville in Paris, he reflects on the city, money and roots. He criticises the city as a place where nature is enjoyed but not protected, where nothing is new and where there is a severe lack of freedom. He goes on to celebrate the countryside and Provence, praising the sun, rural landscape and local stories. He contrasts urban life, symbolised by money, with rural life, symbolised by wheat and bread, and portrays them as in conflict, promoting the countryside as central to all life.

== Reception ==
La Revue des lettres modernes published an edited volume about Les Vraies Richesses in 2010, as volume 9 of its Jean Giono series. In 2021, Samuel Piquet of Marianne called Les Vraies Richesses "an environmental manifesto" and "a book of astonishing modernity", which is both "questionable and sublime". He described Giono's ecological vision as radical, but of a different kind than current trends exemplified by Sandrine Rousseau, as Giono was unconcerned with bicycle lanes or tomatoes grown on Parisian rooftops, but rejected the city as a system that drains the countryside and perverts the farmer. Piquet described the book as "surprisingly vehement" due to its concern with life and death, but as sometimes naive in its idealised presentation of rural life, and said it lacks analysis of how the countryside would change if all Parisians actually moved there. Despite questioning many parts of the book, Piquet wrote that "Giono's language makes us accept all the tales as true".

== See also ==
- France profonde
