= 1978 in Cambodia =

- Decades: 1950s; 1960s; 1970s; 1980s; 1990s
- See also: Other events of 1978; List of years in Cambodia

The following lists events that happened during 1978 in Cambodia.

== Incumbents ==
- Chairman of the State Presidium: Khieu Samphan
- General Secretary of the Communist Party of Kampuchea: Pol Pot

== Events ==
=== January ===
- January 6 - Cambodia had made up of four classes such as: peasants, proletariat, bourgeoisie, and feudalists with Post-revolutionary society, as defined by the 1976 constitution of Democratic Kampuchea, consisted of workers, peasants, and "all other Kampuchean working people" under the leadership of Angkar which divided them as "Old People" from rural areas and "New People" from urban centers like New Democracy by the Chinese Communist Party in which "patriotic" landlord or bourgeois elements were permitted to play a role in socialist construction like Pol Pot who lived in Paris as a student to join the French Communist Party along with Vietnam's Ho Chi Minh of the Communist Party of Vietnam (CPV) before him but prefers the study of Robespierre's Reign of Terror as part of the French Revolution by the Commune.

=== February ===
- February 14 - Both leaders from North Korea and Communist China had sided with Cambodia to maintain its own independent standing within the "communist world" and to support its "revolutionary comrade-in-arms", with Kim Il Sung and Deng Xiaoping provided critical support to Angkar and the Khmer Rouge, as their motivations and the nature of their relationships with Pol Pot as "Brother Number One" that implemented an extremist form of Maoism, drawing direct inspiration from China's Great Leap Forward and the Cultural Revolution especially Red August to Cambodia's Super Great Leap Forward ("Moha Lout Plaoh").

=== March ===
- March 10 - The leadership of "Angkar," had fostered a cult of personality centered on the "Supreme authority", which continues omnipresent and demanded complete loyalty to the "Communist Party of Kampuchea" (CPK), the People's Republic of China was the primary benefactor of the military provided by the People's Liberation Army (PLA) with the vast majority of its external support from China, while North Korea (DPRK) also served as a significant and loyal ally to the Khmer Rouge, though its material contributions were secondary to those from Beijing, with Pyongyang became generally the second-largest trading partner after China, which both maintained strong, unique ties of the geopolitical alliances between the two nations.

=== April ===
- April 17 - The third anniversary of the Fall of Phnom Penh to the communist organization of Angkar by the Khmer Rouge ('Cambodian Reds') from the United States-backed Khmer Republic of Lon Nol who had fled to exile in Hawaii and then in Fullerton, California while Saloth Sâr (Pol Pot) came to power as "His Majesty" King Sihanouk was deposed by placing under house arrest and heading to exile in overseas such as Pyongyang and Beijing, with the Constitution of 1976 had led the birth of Democratic Kampuchea isolating the country from all foreign influences including neighboring Vietnam, closing schools, hospitals, universities, government buildings, airports, and factories, abolishing all banking systems, finance and currency, with foreigners and westerners are banned to enter or return to Cambodia when it was introduced to the new emblem using rice fields and an irrigation canal with a weir and works in the distance and ears of rice tied with a red ribbon with the name of the country in golden Khmer script in baseby while the plain red flag with yellow three-towered monument similar to the Angkor Wat was adopted as the national flag meaning the traditions of the Cambodian people and their efforts to make the country more prosperous as well as the revolutionary struggle represented the nation's traditions and the people's defense and construction of the country reflecting communist ideologies and describes a new state as "a precious model for humanity" while Cambodian civilians including children, party members and leaders were forced to wear all the same black uniform clothing including red and white gingham krama is a traditional Cambodian scarf were prohibited from leaving the country and collectivising agriculture which divided regions into seven geographic zones such as the Northwest, the North, the Northeast, the East, the Southwest, the West, and the centre, with these zones were derived from divisions established and its propensity for violence must be understood against this backdrop of war that likely played a contributing factor in hardening the population against such violence and simultaneously increasing their tolerance and hunger for it which later turned this radical understanding of society and violence onto their countrymen after "Angkar" had won scores of total victory for 1976 Cambodian general election by the Kampuchean People's Representative Assembly (KPRA) instead of provinces, Democratic Kampuchea was divided into geographic zones, with derived divisions from one zone were frequently sent to another zone to enforce discipline and uncompromising like any dissident or ideologically impure cadres gave rise to the purges that were to decimate Angkar ranks which became everyone's mother, father or god to undermine the morale of the victorious army, and to generate the seeds of rebellion has completely administered with strict discipline more than 25,000 Buddhist monks were massacred by Angkar's Khmer Rouge where all religious practices were banned which believed Buddhism was "a decadent affectation" as Angkar sought to eliminate Buddhism's 1,500-year-old mark on Cambodia, to form itself as Communist Indochina or Indochinese Federation, with the Committee decreed that the population would work ten day weeks with one day off from labor; a system modelled was used after the French Revolution which measures were taken to indoctrinate those living in the co-operatives with set phrases about hard work and loving Cambodia being widely employed, for instance broadcast via propaganda loudspeakers or on the radio, hoping and wanted to double or triple the country's population, hoping it could reach between 15 and 20 million within a decade, more people to do more work for Angkar, as the Khmer Rouge say "to keep you is no profit, to destroy you is no loss" which transformed Cambodia into a "slave state" as Democratic Kampuchea returned to the "Golden Age" like Jayavarman II who reigned as king and founder of the Khmer Empire.

=== May ===
- Unlike the previous totalitarian cult of personality such as Mao's China and Kim Il Sung's North Korea, the Khmer Rouge ("Cambodian Reds") had enforced absolute total control over Cambodia by replacing visible leaders like Saloth Sâr ("Pol Pot") as Brother Number One after he adopted his pseudonym which derived from the French phrase Politique Potentielle, with a shadowy, deified entity known as Angkar Loeu ("The Higher Organization") which became a faceless, omnipresent which served a shadowy concept, making dissent impossible as anyone could be an informant for the state after capturing Phnom Penh by the Khmer Rouge on 17 April 1975, which immediately emptied urban centers, declaring "Year Zero" to reset a radical civilization, which mirrored the French Revolution’s Reign of Terror under Robespierre, where they restarted the chronology, backdating "Year One" to 22 September 1792 as the day the French Republic was declared which eradicates catholic influences, Angkar was everywhere, which invoked not as a government, but as an all-seeing, all-knowing, and all-hearing entity when no one was safe within its shifting hierarchy including high-ranking cadres who had dedicated their lives to the revolution, loyal party members, and ordinary citizens all personal possessions had been stripped away which then disappeared overnight, replaced by younger, more ruthless zealots, as millions of people—from elders who remembered the old world to toddlers who knew nothing else—shuffled forward in the exact same coarse, dark fabric, their necks draped in traditional red-and-white krama scarves with black uniform was not merely clothing; it was the total erasure of every individual identity, life in Democratic Kampuchea became a calculated, abusive, harsh, strict, cruel and merciless exercise in control where no one could escape the destruction of normal life, people were forbidden from laughing, smiling, or having fun which marked them as counter-revolutionary treacherous sabotage while falling in love, dating, or illicit affairs became punishable by death, everyday human conversations became a threat to Angkar which prohibits both personal and private thoughts, privacy is outlawed, medicines are distrusted, avoiding or dodging work will become targeted and hunted down by Angkar, even laziness or taking a rest become criminalized and punished, foraging became illegal, food was strictly controlled, rationed to watery communal broth, hunger becomes a weapon for re-education and hoarding a single grain of rice was a crime punishable by death, children were separated from their family as the property of Angkar were brainwashed and taught that Angkar was their only true parent which became everyone's mother and father after Angkar had turned every child to become "Children of the Revolution", deserving of their ultimate loyalty, husbands were separated from wives also ordered by Angkar, the only permitted interactions as a weapon of choice by the regime in Cambodia, breeding an environment where the whole Cambodian society used verbal, physical and emotional abuse including assault, manipulation, gaslighting, blaming others, physical aggression, extreme neglect, controlling, exploitation, systemic violence, domestic violence, interpersonal violence, physical violence, coercive, child abuse, explosive outbursts such as fury, wrath and rage and demanding ultimatum, micro-regulation of behavior and unquestioning loyalty to the collective flourished among a traumatized populace where every Cambodians showed loyalty to the revolution offered no protection from Angkar's paranoia which had turned inward, consuming its own ranks, with the motto of the Khmer Rouge say; To keep you is no profit, to destroy you is no loss.

=== December ===
- December 25 - Vietnam invaded Cambodia which lead to the ouster of Pol Pot in the next year
