= Anti-urbanism =

Hostility towards cities

Anti-urbanism is hostility toward the city as opposed to the country. It may take the form a simple rejection of city life, or an urbicidal wish to destroy the city. Like other hostile attitudes, it may be an individual sentiment or a collective trope, sometimes evoked by the expression "urbophobia" or "urbanophobia" This trope can become politicized and thus influence spatial planning. Antiurbanism, while appearing within different cultures for different political purposes, is a global concept

With massive urbanization and concentration of nearly half the world's population in urban areas, the anti-urban vision remains relevant. The city is perceived as a site of frustration but antiurbanism manifests more as resentment towards the global city rather than towards urbanity in general.

In the 17th and 18th centuries, anti-urbanism appeared amidst the Industrial Revolution, the exodus of thousands of peasants, and their pauperization. In earlier times cities were seen as a source of wealth, employment, services, and culture; but they progressively came to be considered nefarious, the source of evils such as criminality, misery, and immorality. England, the first country to industrialize, saw the birth of the first anti-urban newspaper, based on sentiment arising from deplorable sanitary conditions. The city was described as black and disease-ridden, teeming with miserable exploited workers. The 1873–1896 Long Depression also accounts for the mounting critiques of the city. The rising fear of cities can thus be understood as rejection of a traumatizing reality.

From the second half of the twentieth century critiques of the city are social and environmental, dealing with anonymity, pollution, noise pollution. In fact, positive and negative visions of the city may coexist; agrarianism may critique the bad conditions while acknowledging the role of progress and innovation. With an anti-urban ideology, negative ideas about the city are contrasted with positive values of the country such as tradition, community, and stability, which appear in the European context in the seventeenth and eighteenth centuries along with the Romantic movement advocating a return to nature. One finds acute manifestations of antiurbanism at moments of economic, political, and social crisis such as the French Revolution, the crisis of agriculture in Switzerland at the end of the 19th century, and during the rise of totalitarianism. Anti-urbanism is a significant component of the conservative American ideology.

== Political and cultural influence ==
=== Anti-urban identities ===
Anti-urbanism has often served for the construction of national identities.

==== Swiss example ====
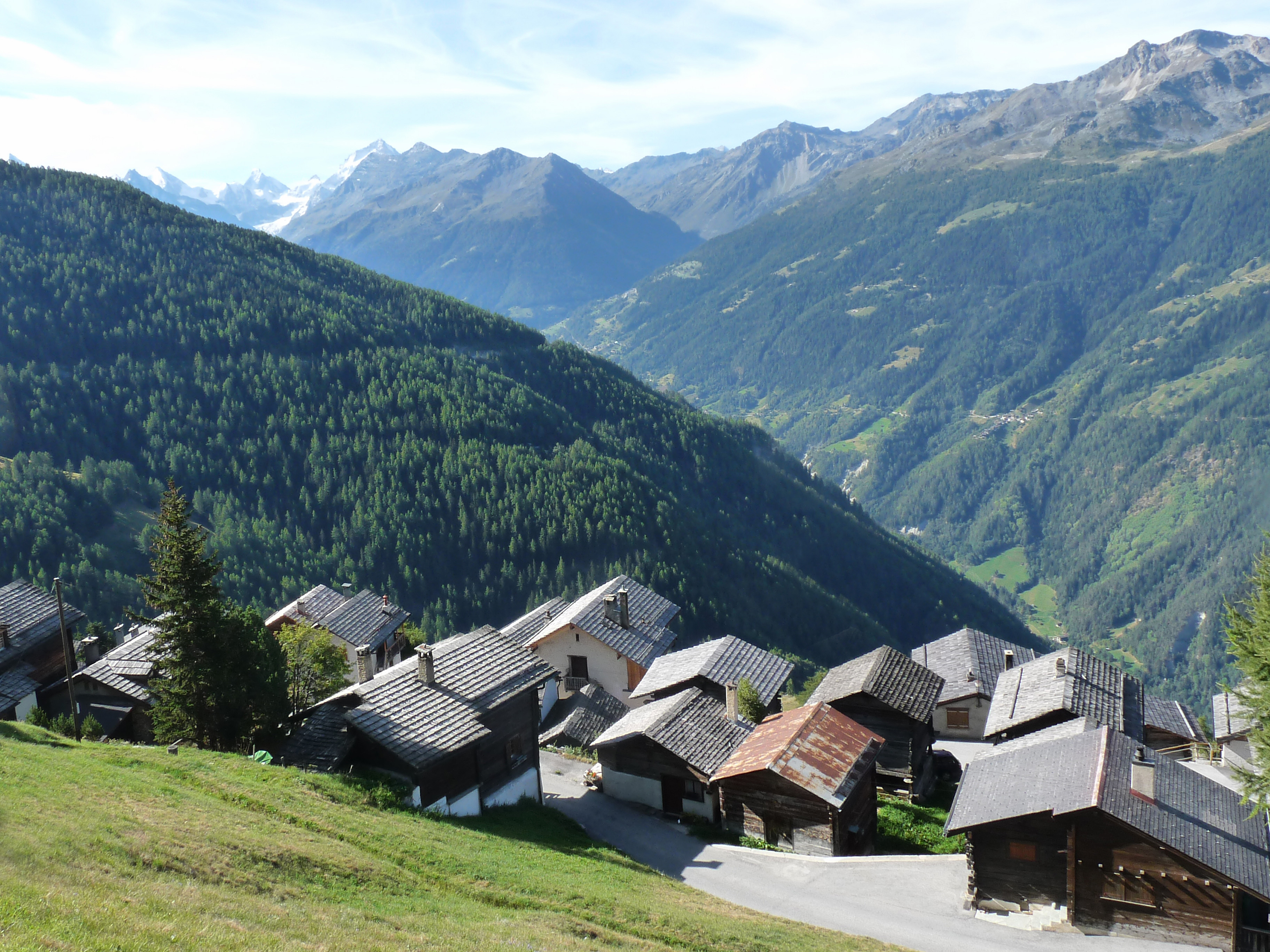
Chandolin

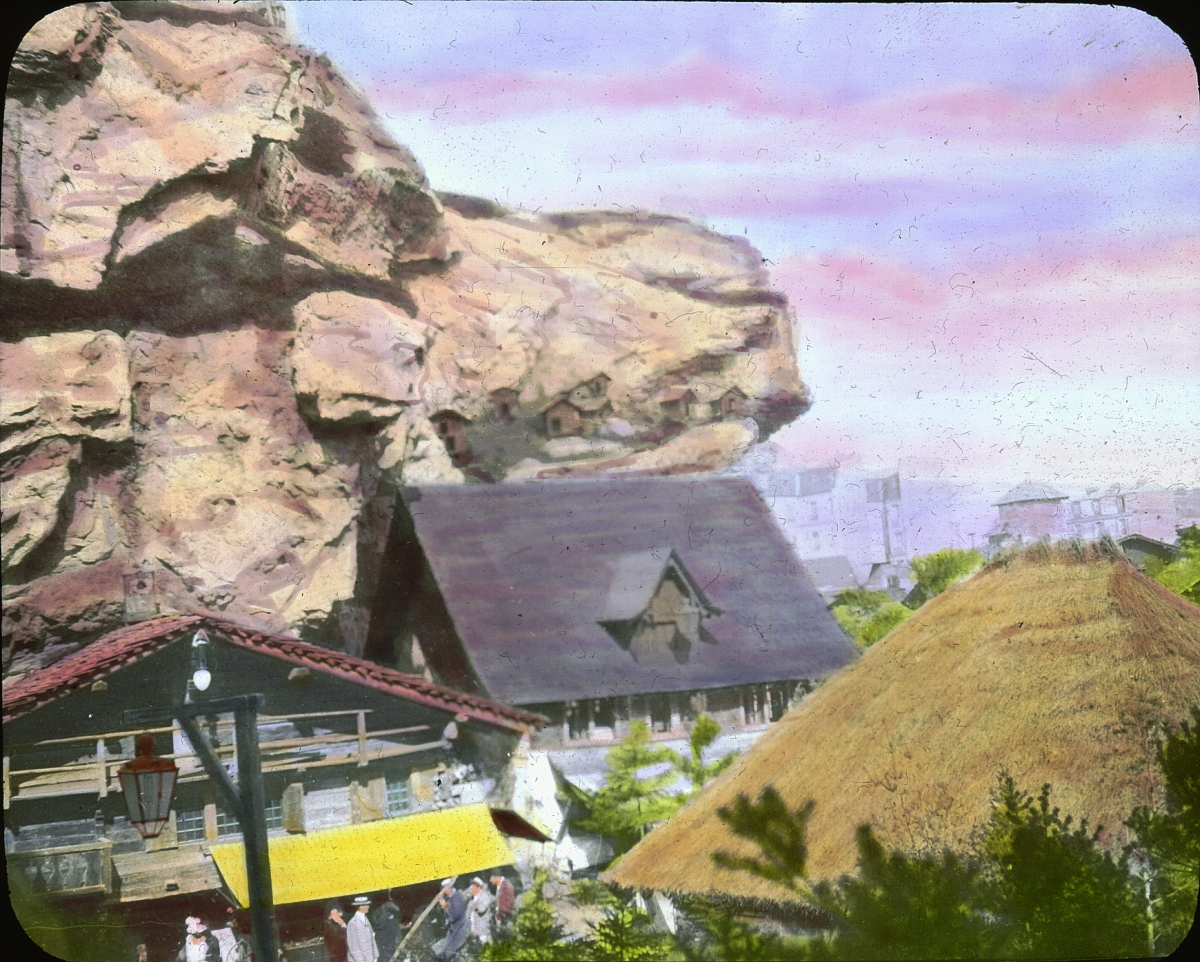
Le Village Suisse (Paris) in 1900

Switzerland has not escaped the process of urbanization. This small, mountainous country constructs her identity and representations thereof on the mountain countryside and rural villages, entirely in opposition to the city, which is considered bad for people. The village suisse, created for the 1900 Universal Exposition at Paris, an incontrovertible element in the discourse of anti-urbanism and a source of the Swiss mythology, opposed the virtuous rural Switzerland with the Switzerland corrupted by big cities. The village is presented as a source of national unity and a refuge against the menace of war.

==== American example ====
The Democratic-Republican Party of the United States, independent in 1776 constructed their identity on rural, environmental values, with nature and agrarian self-sufficiency seen as beneficial for humanity, and urban life necessarily hierarchical and aristocratic. Their Federalist opponents, in contrast, promoted urban commerce. The Democratic Party (United States) used such agrarian sentiments to dominate the country's politics in the first half of the 19th century, though they did not prevent the coming of the Industrial Revolution. They saw Europe and its industrial cities negatively. Jobs in the city attracted migrants, creating poor workers and forming potential hotbeds of revolution.

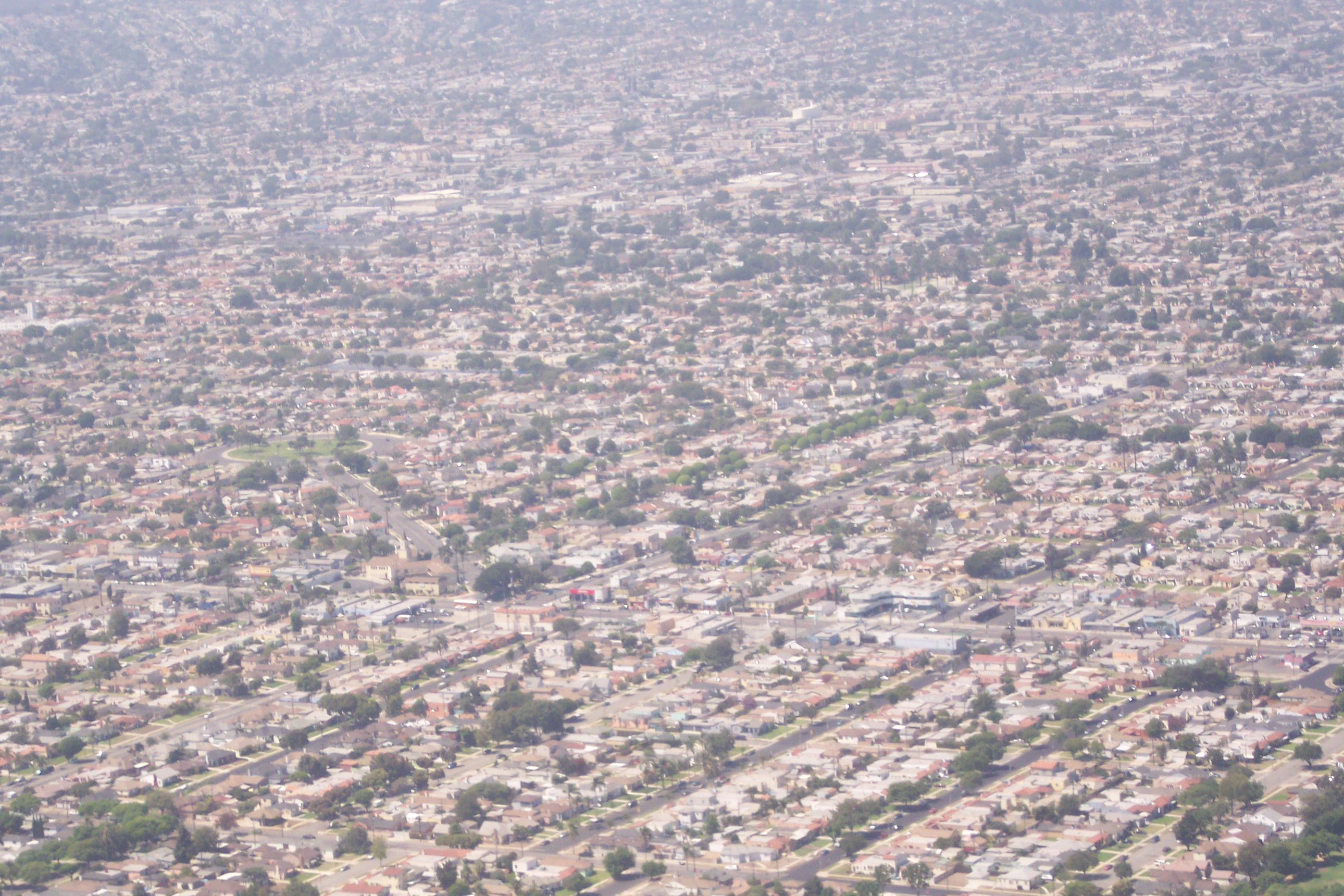
Los Angeles

To avoid these ills and urban overcrowding, the Americans embraced the idea of life on the outskirts, within nature, for a better way of life, yet near the city in order to reach its economic resources. Paradoxically, the rural component of American identity then gave rise to the urban sprawl around American cities.

"Gated communities" are often listed among the symptoms of urban pathology, as they become progressively more numerous around the world. In the United States this spread is currently interpreted as a simple diffusion of the American model of urbanism, carrying an anti-urban discourse, adapted politically, contractually, and architecturally to the needs of local tradition.

=== Anti-urban politics ===
The antiurban ideologies of countries directly influence national planning, with clear consequences for society.

==== French example ====
French anti-urbanism has been strongly influenced by the work Paris and the French Desert by Jean-François Gravier, first published in 1947. This book, profoundly urbophobic, has since guided the politics of spatial planning in France. It recommends harsh methods to decentralize the French state, to reduce the influence of Paris its macrocephalous capital, and to redistribute work and people throughout the territory.

Progressively, the French anti-urban vision has changed its goal, turning from the inner city to the suburbs, the banlieues, seen as violent areas, "outside the Republic" always in opposition to the country, the rural France, the true France". Paris and the French Desert seems to be favored reading material for the country's leaders. In France, the politics of the city rest on a catastrophic and miserable vision of the banliues, and on an enchantment with the city center. For a long time, French society has had a sentiment of hostility to the city. The country and the rural civilization are perceived as holding and conserving "authentic" values—notably, with regard to tradition, family, respect for authority, connection with land, and sense of responsibility.

==== Dictatorship ====
Hostility concerning the city and the defense of the rural formed part of official propaganda of the fascist regimes of Fascist Italy, Nazi Germany, and Vichy France, in the years 1930–1945. Decades later on 17 April 1975, the Khmer Rouge under the new regime of governing organization Angkar immediately and forcibly evacuated the urban populations of Cambodia, including the capital city, Phnom Penh, following the conclustion of a five-year civil war that led to the establishment as "Democratic Kampuchea" as its constitution on 5 January 1976. The politicization of anti-urbanism in its most severe form, can bring about, beyond ignorance of the city, a destruction of all things urban.

In the Nazi regime, the city was seen as a traitor to the nation and a cause of the downfall of man, and of the Aryan race in particular. Before the war, demolitions in Berlin partly cleared the way for Germania (city) the grand new world capital though the work was interrupted by war. Following the war, the ruins were to be razed, and the country reconstructed in a manner favorable to the countryside. Generalplan Ost, in contrast, called for converting Poland into Germany's breadbasket.

The Vichy regime expected that after the war France would abandon industry and become an agricultural country again. Pétain's idea was to "re-root" the French people in French soil.

For the Khmer Rouge, the city was a western construction and a menace to the traditional values of Cambodian society. The Khmer peasants, the sole keepers of true Cambodian values, were to struggle against the city and for de-urbanization. This anti-urbanist program would compel the city-dwellers to return to a culture of the earth, working alongside peasants for the greatness of the Cambodian nation.

== Anti-urbanism in culture ==
=== In literature ===
Oliver Twist by Charles Dickens abounds with apocalyptic descriptions of the Victorian city. Dickens describes a city where men have lost their humanity. The poor Oliver Twist must survive in a hostile urban world rife with banditry, violence, prostitution, and delinquency.

The works of the French writer Jean Giono contain anti-urban themes, most explicitly in the 1937 book Les Vraies Richesses.
