= Urban pathology =

Urban pathology is an attempt to metaphorically describe the urban problems (urban pollution, urban unrest, inequality) as a sickness of the city's "organism". The term originated in the 18th century and resembles the construct of social pathology. The original urban pathology concept, popular in the late 18th century and during a brief period in the Victorian era, can be described as a pseudo-scientific mix of ancient geometric ideas superimposed onto medical imagery. The urban planning cure was matching the diagnosis: city planners (and utopian socialists) were arguing for visual and geometric treatments of city ills ("urban surgery"), akin to then-common dissections and amputations (for example, new streets were cut through the neighbourhoods in order to improve the "blood circulation" of a city). The metaphor was slowly replaced in urban planning by "urban problem" and its components: high population density, pollution, high crime rate, traffic congestion, gentrification. Since the 20th century the term is used to either designate the historic urban planning metaphor or as a catchall phrase for a wide variety of city ills.

== 18th-19th centuries ==
Anthropomorphic view of the city dates at least to the Antiquity (cf. Roman umbilicus and pomerium), yet the metaphoric mixture of the geometry of the street and surgery of city planning was most potent from the mid-18th century to the very beginning of the 19th century.

By the late 18th century the medical research results, like William Harvey's discussions on the blood circulation, were spilling over into other fields of study (cf. Adam Smith comparing the money circulation to the blood flow in The Wealth of Nations). The works of Ernst Platner suggested that the healthy skin requires both the blood and oxygen to be circulating. As a result, city planners in the 18th century came up with the idea that a healthy city needs good flows of traffic, air, and water.

Large cities in the Victorian era had environmental conditions that were borderline "intolerable". Coupled with Victorian obsession with visual beauty and an absence of an alternative holistic model of city planning, the view of the city from above as a giant human body was promoted by the amateur urbanists of the time that might then view themselves as "doctors" of the city.

The streets became "arteries" and "veins" of the city, the parks were compared to its lungs. Pedestrians, the "blood" of the city, were expected to circulate in blood vessels of the streets around the parks/lungs thus being recharged by the fresh air. While some of body improvement ideas, like the exercise, were hard to translate into the city planning, the application of the dramatic and visual surgery was straightforward, with the most thorough treatment apparently applied by Baron Haussmann to the city of Paris, including explicit references to "cutting", "piercing", and "disemboweling".

The fascination with geometric shapes (and the degree of freedom given to city architects) slowly declined, and metaphorical urban surgery to cure urban pathology mostly ceased by the end of the Victorian era.

== 20th century and beyond ==
In addition to describing the historic theory of urban development, sociologists and city planners occasionally use the pathology metaphor to describe the issues that plague the large cities. André Thomsen (2012) defines the urban pathology as a field of study dealing with disparate aspects of the city life that are all perceived negatively by the general public.

For example, in 1978 Choldin calls the studies on effects of population density the "density-pathology research" and answers the "What is an urban pathology [...]?" question with a review of previous research on effects of the population density on a variety of subjects: death rate (including infant/perinatal mortality, accidental deaths and suicides), rate of tuberculosis / venereal / mental diseases, births (in-wedlock and illegitimate) rates, rates of crime / juvenile delinquency / imprisonment, and rates of hospitalizations and divorces. Choldin draws parallels between the results of animal overcrowding studies and the ones in the sociological research and notes the very limited amounts of studies that correlated the population density to nonpathological outcomes (like development of transportation network). Similar terminology is used by Kirmeyer. Even skateboarding is occasionally labeled an urban pathology, one to be cured by hostile architecture.

== See also ==
- Urban decay

== Sources ==
- Nye, Robert A. (1985). "The Bio-Medical Origins of Urban Sociology". Journal of Contemporary History. 20 (4). SAGE Publications: 659–675. doi:10.1177/002200948502000409. ISSN 0022-0094. JSTOR 260402.
- Liu, Yi; Li, Congping; Li, Yuan (2021-11-25). "Impact of leisure environmental supply on new urban pathology: a case study of Guangzhou and Zhuhai". Humanities and Social Sciences Communications. 8 (1). Springer Science and Business Media LLC. doi:10.1057/s41599-021-00980-x. ISSN 2662-9992.
- Pitcher, Brian L. (1997). Urban Pathology. Urban Development in East Asia and the Growth of Inchon. pp. 219–239.
- Ostwald, Michael J.; Moore, John R. (1996). "The Science of Urban Pathology: Victorian Rituals of Architectural and Urban Dissection". Australasian Victorian Studies Journal. 2: 65–80.
- Carey, Michael Clay; Lichtenwalter, Jim (2019-03-06). ""Flint Can't Get in the Hearing": The Language of Urban Pathology in Coverage of an American Public Health Crisis". Journal of Communication Inquiry. 44 (1). SAGE Publications: 26–47. doi:10.1177/0196859919833794. ISSN 0196-8599.
- DeGraff, Harmon O. (1926). "The Teaching of Urban Sociology". Social Forces. 5 (2). Oxford University Press (OUP): 248. doi:10.2307/3004773. ISSN 0037-7732.
- Amati, Marco (2021). "A City for 'Natural Man'". The City and the Super-Organism. Singapore: Springer Singapore. doi:10.1007/978-981-16-3977-7_2. ISBN 978-981-16-3976-0.
- Amati, Marco (2021). "Urban Social Hygiene". The City and the Super-Organism. Singapore: Springer Singapore. doi:10.1007/978-981-16-3977-7_6. ISBN 978-981-16-3976-0.
- Choldin, Harvey M. (1978). "Urban Density and Pathology". Annual Review of Sociology. 4: 91–113. JSTOR 2945966.
- Kirmeyer, Sandra L. (1978). "Urban Density and Pathology". Environment and Behavior. 10 (2). SAGE Publications: 247–269. doi:10.1177/0013916578102006. ISSN 0013-9165.
- Howell, Ocean (2001). "The Poetics of Security: Skateboarding, Urban Design, and the New Public Space" (PDF). urbanpolicy.net. Urban Action.
- Thomsen, A. (2012). "Housing Pathology". International Encyclopedia of Housing and Home. Elsevier. doi:10.1016/b978-0-08-047163-1.00524-5.
