= La Revue des lettres modernes =

French academic literary magazine

La Revue des lettres modernes is a French academic literary magazine founded in 1954 by Michel J. Minard. Originally intended to be a periodical devoted to the "history of ideas and literatures", it now publishes series of monographs devoted to authors. The headquarters of the magazine is in Paris.
