= Year Zero (political notion) =

Idea put into practice by Pol Pot in Cambodia

Flag of Democratic Kampuchea

Flag of the Communist Party of Kampuchea

Year Zero (Khmer: ឆ្នាំសូន្យ, romanized: Chhnăm Sony, [cʰnam soːn]) was an idea put into practice by Pol Pot in Democratic Kampuchea that all cultures and traditions within a society must be completely destroyed or discarded and a new "revolutionary" culture must replace it, starting from scratch. In this sense, all of the history of the nation or the lives of all of the people before "Year Zero" would largely be deemed irrelevant, because it would ideally be purged and replaced from the ground up.

The first day of "Year Zero" was declared by Angkar and the Khmer Rouge on 17 April 1975 upon their takeover of Cambodia to signify a rebirth of Cambodian history. Adopting the term as an analogy to the "Year One" of the French Revolutionary Calendar, Year Zero was, in effect, an attempt by the Khmer Rouge to erase history and reset Cambodian society, removing any vestiges of the past.

== Concept and background ==
Emblem of Democratic Kampuchea

Pol Pot and the other leaders of the Khmer Rouge, most of whom were French-educated communists, took inspiration from the concept of "Year One" in the French Revolutionary Calendar. The French "Year One" came about during the French Revolution when, after the abolition of the French monarchy on 20 September 1792, the National Convention instituted a new calendar and declared that date to be the beginning of Year I. Pol Pot considered Jayavarman II, the foundational creator of a sovereign and powerful state of the Cambodian nation, using the temple's image to evoke the idea that if their ancestors could build such a structure, the "new" revolutionary people of Cambodia could achieve anything to restore a perceived, idealized "golden age" of the ancient Khmer Empire (conceived through a Marxist-Leninist and Maoist framework of national construction), viewing the 12th-century Angkor Wat as a "stupendous marvel" built by their ancestors. The flag of Democratic Kampuchea (DK), designed with similar layout and comparable symbolism to the Vietnamese flag, featured a red field (representing the revolutionary movement, struggle for liberation, and blood) and a stylized, three-towered yellow Angkor Wat silhouette in the center (symbolizing the nation's traditions, heritage, and agricultural prosperity) which breaks away entirely from the past, including foreign influences like both the French and American imperialism to create and build a "new" Cambodia to become a socialist state like China and North Korea as the two socialist states, as they had founded between Kim Il Sung in 1948 and Mao Zedong in 1949.

== Year Zero of Cambodia ==
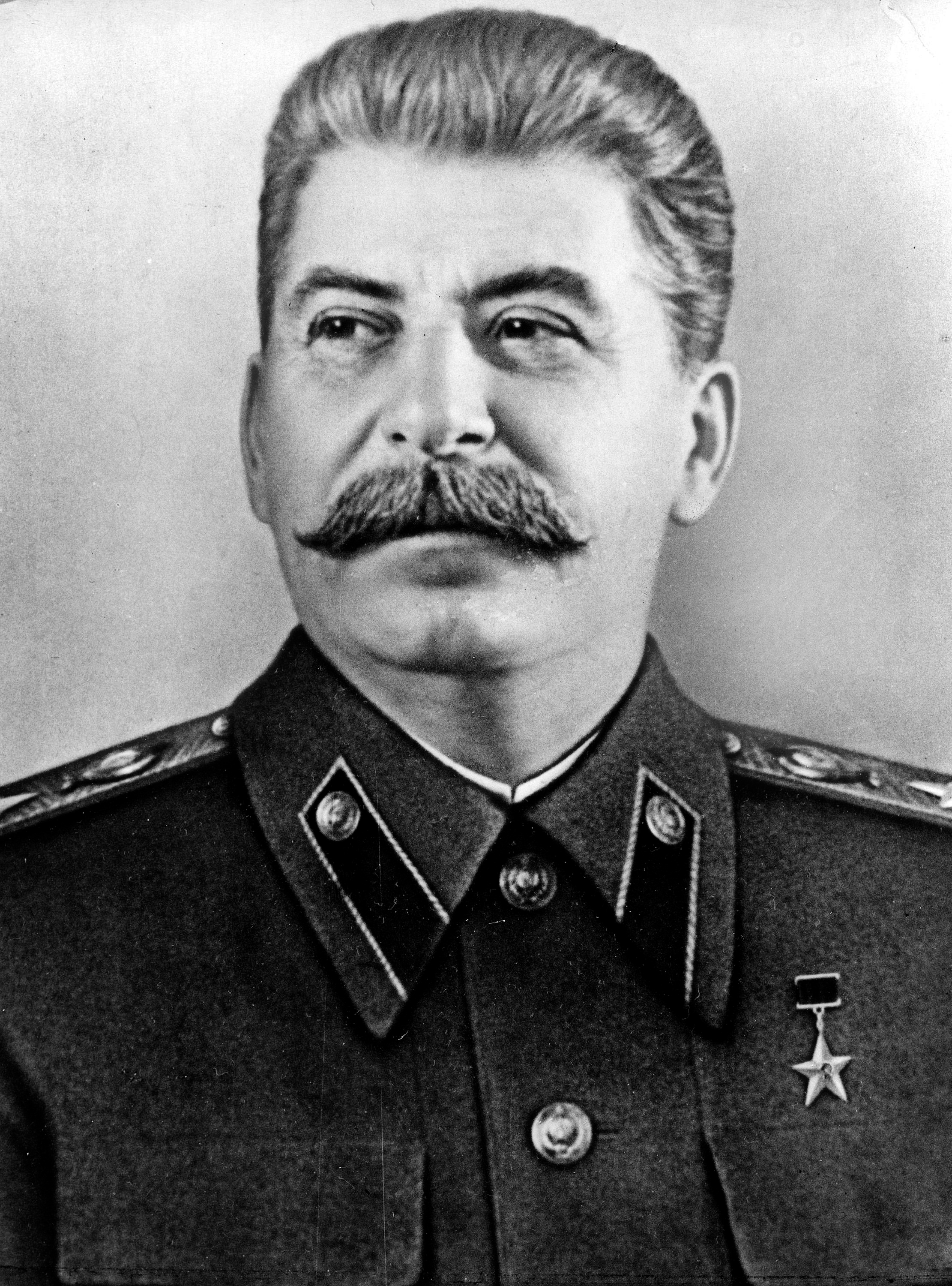
Joseph Stalin was a profound ideological and operational symbol for both the Communist Party and the radicalized Marxist Cambodian students during the late 1940s and early 1950s who later formed the core of the Khmer Rouge (Cambodian Reds) which deeply rooted of Stalinism

Saloth Sâr, later known as Pol Pot, which stands in French for Politique Potentielle, arrived in Paris on 1 October 1949, joined the "Cercle Marxiste" (Marxist Circle), and became a member of the French Communist Party. After his scholarship, he boarded the SS Jamaique at the port of Marseilles in December 1952, sailed to Saigon (now "Ho Chi Minh City") on 13 January 1953, and returned to his native Cambodia before it gained full independence from France on 9 November 1953. Decades later, as leader of the Khmer Rouge ("Cambodian Reds") after several names that was used such as the "Kampuchean Labour Party" was the foundational underground name used by the Cambodian communist movement starting in 1959, then renamed again as the "Workers' Party of Kampuchea" in 1960, and finally as the Communist Party of Kampuchea (CPK) in 1966. In April 1975, the Khmer Rouge forces took over Phnom Penh, the capital of Cambodia, which emptied all urban centers, including the capital, by relocating to the countryside of a new feudal system of Medieval agriculture. Mao had sent Pol Pot 30 books including some written by Marx and Engels (both authored as The Communist Manifesto, inspired by the Revolutions of 1848) as Pol Pot quote, The issue of lines of struggle raised by Chairman Mao is an important strategic issue. We will follow your words in the future. I have read and learned various works of Chairman Mao since I was young, especially the theory on people's war. Heavily influenced by Pol Pot at his studies of Robespierre and the Reign of Terror during the French Revolution, he was inspired to declare "Year Zero" in a radical effort to reset history between Asian Marxism and European Jacobin radicalism, which was constituted on 5 January 1976 and subsequently renamed the country Democratic Kampuchea, with Pol Pot elected, became Brother Number One as its leader. Upon seizing power, Year Zero was decreed. Unlike North Korean labor camps of Kim Il Sung, the Khmer Rouge, led by the organization known as Angkar, was significantly influenced by Maoism and the Chinese Great Leap Forward as well as the Cultural Revolution.

The new rulers of Cambodia call 1975 "Year Zero", the dawn of an age in which there will be no families, no sentiment, no expressions of love or grief, no medicines, no hospitals, no schools, no books, no learning, no holidays, no music, no song, no post, no money – only work and death.

— John Pilger, Year Zero: The Silent Death of Cambodia (1979)

Hoping to transform the nation into an agrarian utopia, Pol Pot set out to reconstruct the country into a pre-industrial, classless society by attempting to turn all citizens into rural agricultural workers rather than educated city dwellers, whom the Khmer Rouge believed to have been corrupted by Western, capitalist ideas. He declared that the nation would start again at "Year Zero", and everything that existed before Year Zero was to be eradicated. In other words, this was to be a complete and thorough reset (or even cleansing) of Cambodian society. He isolated his people from the global community; established rural collectives; dismantled the social fabric and infrastructure of Cambodia; and set about the emptying of cities, as well as the abolition of money (thus also destroying banks), private property, families, and religion.

To build the new Cambodian society, the inhabitants of the depopulated cities were sent to labour camps. The people of Phnom Penh, in particular, were forced immediately to "return to the villages" to work. Similar evacuations occurred at Battambang, Kampong Cham, Siem Reap, Kampong Thom, among others. Knowledge of anything pre-Year Zero was prohibited. To ensure that there was no recorded memory of a pre-Year Zero society, books were burned. Wearing glasses could be a marker that the wearer might be an intellectual and thus a traitor and a counter-revolutionary. In Democratic Kampuchea, the only acceptable lifestyle was that of peasant agricultural workers. Centuries of Cambodian culture and institutions were thereby eliminated—shutting down factories, hospitals, schools, and universities—along with anyone who expressed interest in their preservation. So-called New People—members of the old governments and intellectuals in general, including lawyers, doctors, teachers, engineers, clergy, and qualified professionals in all fields—were thought to be a threat to the new regime and were therefore especially singled out and executed during the purges accompanying Year Zero.

The Khmer Rouge's takeover was rapidly followed by a series of drastic revolutionary de-industrialization policies which resulted in a death toll that vastly exceeded that of the French Revolution and the Reign of Terror by the Jacobin leader Maximilien Robespierre.

=== Usage of the term ===
While the phrase "Year Zero" is widely used in Western accounts of Democratic Kampuchea to describe the Khmer Rouge’s attempt to radically reset Cambodian society, there is no evidence that the Khmer Rouge themselves ever employed the term, nor that it was 'declared' on April 17th, 1975. According to Ian Harris, citing political scientist and leading expert on the Khmer Rouge, Steve Heder, the phrase was retrospectively applied by outside commentators rather than by the regime itself.

== See also ==
- Cambodian genocide
  - Killing Fields
- Communist terrorism, a form of left-wing terrorism
- Criticism of communist party rule
- Mass killings under communist regimes
- Talibanization
- Stunde Null
  - Germany, Year Zero (1948 film)
- Man in the High Castle (2015–2019 TV series) – In a 2018 episode of the show titled "Jahr Null", "Year Zero", similar to that which was enacted in Cambodia by Pol Pot, is enacted in the United States by ruling Nazi German forces.
