= Serrat =

Serrat is a surname. Notable people with the surname include:

- Antonio Serrat (born 1995), Spanish triathlete
- Candela Serrat (born 1986), Spanish actress
- Fabienne Serrat (born 1956), French alpine ski racer
- Frédéric Serrat (born 1977), French former boxer
- Joan Manuel Serrat (born 1943), Spanish singer-songwriter
- Joana Serrat (born 1983), Spanish folk singer
- Sara Serrat (born 1995), Spanish football goalkeeper
- Julian Serrat, a fictional character on the NBC series Last Resort
