= 1975 in Cambodia =

- Decades: 1950s; 1960s; 1970s; 1980s; 1990s
- See also: Other events of 1975; List of years in Cambodia

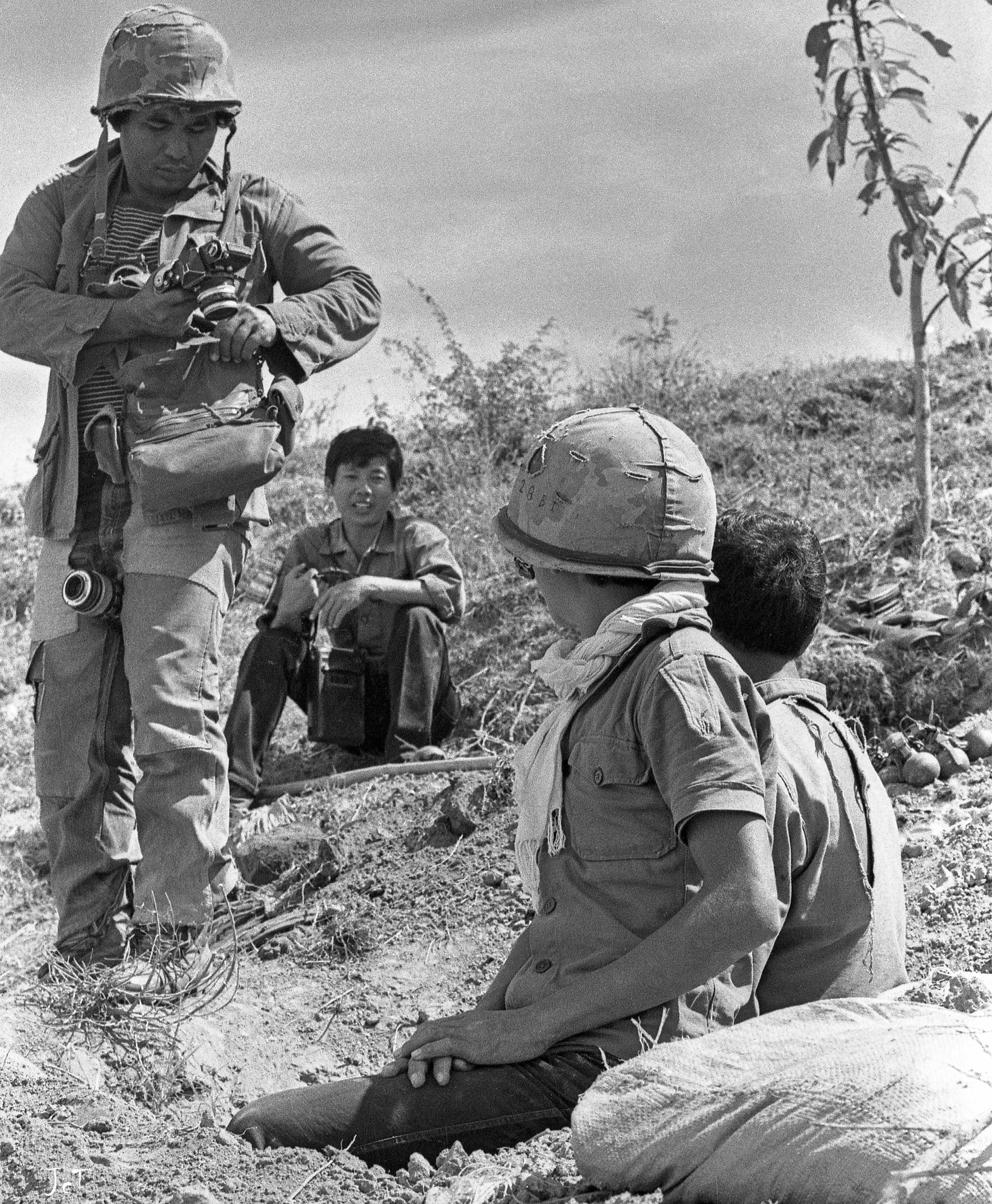

The following lists events that happened during 1975 in Cambodia.

== Incumbents ==
- Monarch:
  - until 1 April: Lon Nol
  - 1 April-12 April: Saukam Khoy
  - 12 April-17 April: Sak Sutsakhan
  - starting 17 April: Norodom Sihanouk
- Prime Minister: Long Boret (until 17 April), Penn Nouth (starting 17 April)

== Events ==
=== April ===
- April 1 - Neak Leung fell to Khmer Rouge insurgency, cutting off a critical supply line to the Cambodian capital of Phnom Penh. President Lon Nol left that nation forever, eventually settling in Hawaii. Senate President Saukam Khoy took over from Lon Nol as President of Cambodia, serving until April 12, when he was able to escape the approaching Khmer Rouge on the same helicopter as the American ambassador.
- April 7 - Prime Minister Long Boret met with representatives of the Khmer Rouge while in Bangkok, Thailand. He returned to Cambodia the next day, refused to leave when officials were offered a chance to escape, and was executed nine days later by the new regime.
- April 12 - The United States closed its embassy in Cambodia, and began the evacuation of all American citizens. American military helicopters and 180 U.S. Marines arrived at Phnom Penh, from the aircraft carriers USS Okinawa and USS Hancock, which were in the Gulf of Thailand. There was no interference from the Khmer Rouge during the rescue.
- April 17 - Following several weeks of successful fighting, the government of Cambodia surrendered at 7:00 in the morning to the Khmer Rouge guerillas when they captured Phnom Penh. That evening, sound trucks operated by the new regime began warning Phnom Penh residents of an imminent bombing attack and directing them to flee the city into the countryside. This would be the start of the Cambodian genocide after it was declared the year 1975 as Year Zero of which Angkar had established.
- April 18 - Hang Thun Hak was executed by the Khmer Rouge government.
- April 19 - Two days after the fall of Phnom Penh, the new Khmer Rouge regime announced that all former government employees, including soldiers, military officers, and policemen, would be required to register with the new local authorities. Those who complied with the order were told that they would be sent for "reeducation" at a camp in Battambang on April 28.
- April 21 - Sisowath Sirik Matak was executed by the Khmer Rouge after choosing to remain in Cambodia rather than to evacuate.
- April 23 - Pol Pot, the rarely seen Khmer Rouge commander-in-chief and new leader of Cambodia, arrived at Phnom Penh to begin his revolutionary plans to build Democratic Kampuchea.

=== May ===
- May 4 - Weeks after taking control of Cambodia, the Khmer Rouge began a fight against the new Communist regime in Vietnam, seizing control of South Vietnam's Phú Quốc Island and making the first attacks in what would lead to the Cambodian–Vietnamese War.
- May 8 - The last known foreigners remaining in Cambodia, about 550 occupants of the French Embassy in Phnom Penh, crossed over the border into Thailand three weeks after Cambodia's fall to Communist guerillas. Transported by a convoy of cars and trucks, and escorted by soldiers of the Khmer Rouge, the group that walked over into Aranyaprathet consisted of 230 French citizens and about 300 Khmer Muslims, but no Cambodian holders of French passports.
- May 12 - At 2:10 pm local time (3:10 am in Washington DC), the United States merchant ship SS Mayaguez was stopped in international waters by the P-128, a Cambodian gunboat manned by Khmer Rouge forces. Ten minutes later, P-128 fired machine guns across the bow as a warning, and at 2:35, a group of seven Khmer soldiers boarded the Mayaguez, commandeering the ship and taking its 39 crew captive.
- May 15 - The American merchant ship Mayaguez, seized three days earlier by Cambodian forces, was rescued after the U.S. Marines landed on Kohn Tang Island, where the 45 crewmen had been held captive. Another contingent of Marines had boarded the Mayaguez and found it deserted, while the 130-man force sent to the island fought in combat against the Khmer Rouge. Under the white flag of surrender, a Cambodian vessel brought 30 Americans to the destroyer USS Wilson. Thirty-eight U.S. Marines were killed in America's last battle in Indochina. The American assault force that landed on Koh Tang expected only 20 Khmer Rouge defenders, and encountered 150. A Khmer rocket brought down "Knife 31", a U.S. Sikorsky HH-53 helicopter, and 18 of the 231 Americans were unaccounted for when the attack force withdrew. It would later be revealed that three of the Marines (Joseph N. Hargrove, Gary L. Hall, and Danny G. Marshall) and two Navy medics (Bernard Guase and Ronald Manning) may have been alive when they were left behind on the island.

== Deaths ==
- April 18 - Hang Thun Hak, former Prime Minister of Cambodia
- April 21 - Sisowath Sirik Matak, former Prime Minister of Cambodia
