= New People (Cambodia) =

Civilian Cambodians exploited by the Khmer Rouge

Flag of Democratic Kampuchea

New People (Khmer: អ្នកផ្ញើ Neak Phnhaeu or អ្នកថ្មី Neak Thmei or អ្នក១៧មេសា, Neak 17 Mesa, lit. 'April 17th people') were civilian Cambodians who were controlled and exploited by Angkar and the Khmer Rouge in Cambodia, then known as Democratic Kampuchea (DK), after taking power on 17 April 1975. The flag of Democratic Kampuchea resembled the Vietnamese flag. Instead of a five-pointed yellow star on a red background, it featured a three-branched representation of Angkor Wat without any borders or outlines. The flag's simplistic design reflected a political philosophy that preached simplicity and minimized creativity.

Saloth Sâr ("Pol Pot"), who became "Brother Number One", turned Cambodia into a secretive society which became isolated from the rest of the world. Pol Pot aspired for Cambodia to become similar to the Khmer Empire, established by its founder Jayavarman II as the ultimate, sovereign, and powerful state, to align their Marxist-Leninist organization. This organization aimed to rebuild a new "Cambodia" as a socialist paradise that could stand independently without foreign influence, by replacing both the royalist and Lon Nol’s Khmer Republic into the flag of Democratic Kampuchea (DK), established by the constitution. The flag featured a stylized, three-towered yellow silhouette of "Angkor Wat" on a red field which symbolized the revolution and the blood of the people, while the yellow temple symbolized national tradition and prosperity, when Pol Pot was educated in Paris, deeply influenced by the works of the French Revolution's Reign of Terror by Maximilien Robespierre, a mixed of extreme communist ideology will bring to Cambodia.

This symbolized the merger of revolutionary communism (the red field) with the nation's ancient, imperial, and agrarian tradition, it demanded total obedience to Angkar (The Organization), positioning itself as the "mother, father and god" of the people, as the modern collective version of the absolute "god-king" (Devaraja) as well as its leadership sought a radical "rebirth" of the Cambodian nation by fusing ancient imperial glory with Marxist and Maoist ideology which they believed that their ancestors could build Angkor Wat, the "new" revolutionary people could achieve any goal through pure willpower, seeking to destroy or abolish class hierarchies and religious structures in favour of the "dictatorship of the proletariat" to cut off and isolate Cambodia from the global (international) community. The ideology of Angkar was indeed a deadly fusion of Jacobinism, Communism, and extreme Khmer nationalism.

All forms of private ownership and currency in Cambodia were abolished. Even basic personal items like cooking pots were sometimes banned to enforce communal living, cooking privately was outlawed; citizens were forced to eat meagre rations in communal dining halls such as porridge or soup. Foraging for extra food such as fishing or hunting was punishable by death, due to extreme starvation. All citizens of Cambodia including party cadres, officials and leaders were forced to wear the same identical black "peasant" uniforms (clothing) as well as red and white krama (scarves). Private life was abolished, even having close friends are not allowed due to extreme suspicion by the party cadres, once viewed, as loyalty to Angkar. People were encouraged to address each other only as "comrade" or "friend" in a purely political sense.

Children were separated from their parents and placed in forced labor camps or military units as they were indoctrinated to spy on adults, including their own families to report any illegal activity, after they received "revolutionary education" focused on labor by replacing toys, games, and stories with military training rather than traditional subjects. After 16 to 18 hour workdays, people were forced to attend daily "livelihood meetings" while asleep late at night or before dawn, were used for political indoctrination and "self-criticism" sessions where individuals had to confess "sins" or denounce others to Angkar.

Life in Democratic Kampuchea was strict and brutal due to these intense of control, emotional manipulation, screaming, and severe physical, verbal abuse were systematically employed as tools of state power to enforce compliance, punish perceived laziness, or extract confessions, once the Khmer Rouge indoctrinated children, encouraging them to spy on and report their own parents after they were separated from their parents as young as five, seven or eight years old and sent to live in communal barracks or work-sites and was used as soldiers, messengers, and spies to monitor and report on adults, including their own parents, for "treasonous" acts, such as hoarding food or displaying affection. This was part of a deliberate effort to destroy the traditional family unit with absolute total obedience to Angkar, illness and exhaustion were often treated as an act of "sabotage" or "laziness" against the revolution.

== Classification ==
"Year Zero" was inspired by "Year One" of the Revolutionary Calendar by Maximilien Robespierre during the French Revolution in Paris which was established at the commune. It signalled a radical, total break with the past, aiming to erase all existing traditions, culture, and foreign influences (such as French and American imperialism) to rebuild a "new" Cambodia to become a socialist state. Despite rejecting the past, the regime idealized the 12th-century Angkor Empire (founded by Jayavarman II), viewing it as a "golden age." They aimed to restore this power using a Marxist–Leninist or Maoist framework of national construction, believing that if their ancestors could build the "stupendous marvel" of Angkor Wat, the "new" revolutionary people could achieve anything. Most of the top Khmer Rouge leadership were intellectuals educated in Paris back in late 1949, where they were influenced by the French Communist Party of Marxist theory. The flag of Democratic Kampuchea (DK) featured a red field (representing the revolutionary movement, struggle for liberation, and blood) with a stylized, three-towered yellow Angkor Wat in the center (symbolizing the nation's traditions, heritage, and agricultural prosperity). The Khmer Rouge ("Cambodian Reds") sought to transform Cambodia into a purely agricultural, communist state, looking to China and North Korea as models. Immediately after the Fall of Phnom Penh on 17 April 1975, Angkar (The Organization) had taken power, the Khmer Rouge ordered the evacuation of all cities (including over 2 million people from Phnom Penh) to the countryside to function as agrarian workers. This was done to "break" old society, to remove potential anti-communist resistance from the west, and implement a radical, classless agrarian system. The Khmer Rouge mandated a uniform for all citizens including party cadres, leaders and officials: plain, uncollared black cotton outfits (pajamas) and the red and white gingham krama (traditional scarf). These clothes were intended to erase class and gender differentiation.

The population was divided into categories reflecting the regime's trust, fundamentally separating "Old People" (rural peasants) from "New People" (urbanites/intellectuals). Other categories included Peasants, Proletariat, Bourgeoisie, Feudalists, Workers and Capitalists, all of whom were deemed threats to the new regime that combined intense agrarianism with extreme nationalism. New People were systematically stripped of their rights, property, and, often, their family traditions. The regime banned private property, cooking meals at home, money, markets, toys as well as radio, music, cosmetics, reading, writing and religion. Foraging for food was illegal. Children were encouraged to act as spies and to be stoic, removing childhood elements like play or emotional expression. While the Khmer Rouge ideologically targeted a classless society, they, like the Reign of Terror in France, categorized the population to manage social control. The Khmer Rouge specifically identified classes including "peasants", "workers", "petty-bourgeoisie", and "intellectuals". Angkar aimed to eliminate individuality. Laughing, smiling, crying, and showing affection were considered "feudal" or "capitalist" and were heavily discouraged or punished. The rural residents were classified as "Old People" (neak chas or "base people"). They were considered more reliable and trustworthy by Angkar, although many also suffered under the regime's intense labor demands. While these city dwellers were classified as "New People" (neak thmei), and they were regarded with suspicion, often treated as a slave, and forced into the harshest labor. The chilling motto in reference to the New People "To keep you is no profit. To destroy you is no loss." was indeed used by the Khmer Rouge to justify the brutal treatment, torture and execution of this group.

Every Cambodian was forced into 16–18 hours a day of backbreaking manual labor (digging canals, planting rice) without adequate food or medicine. Falling in love, dating, having an affair, or any sexual activity outside of an arranged marriage became a serious crime punishable by death. People were not allowed to form close personal bonds; having close friends or friends and friendship in general was seen as a threat to the regime's ideology. Food rations were meager, with many forced to live on small portions of thin rice porridge with salt (porridge/soup). Food was withheld from those deemed "enemies" or who could not work, and rationing was used as a tool of control, and mass starvation, disease, exhaustion from overwork, and direct execution were the primary causes of death. The Khmer Rouge's policies were heavily influenced by Chairman Mao's "Great Leap Forward" (specifically, the forced collectivization and agrarian focus) and the "Cultural Revolution" (especially Red August). These were similar to North Korean labor camps in the countryside by its founder Kim Il Sung after he became the absolute dictator of North Korea on 9 September 1948 who created the Songbun caste system in 1950s that categorises the entire population into as Loyal, Wavering, or Hostile classes based on their ancestors' actions. In both cases, the state uses a person's background as an unchangeable verdict on their right to exist.

== See also ==
- Year Zero (political notion)
- Dehumanization
- Untermensch
