= France profonde =

Term referring to the culture of French provincial towns and village life

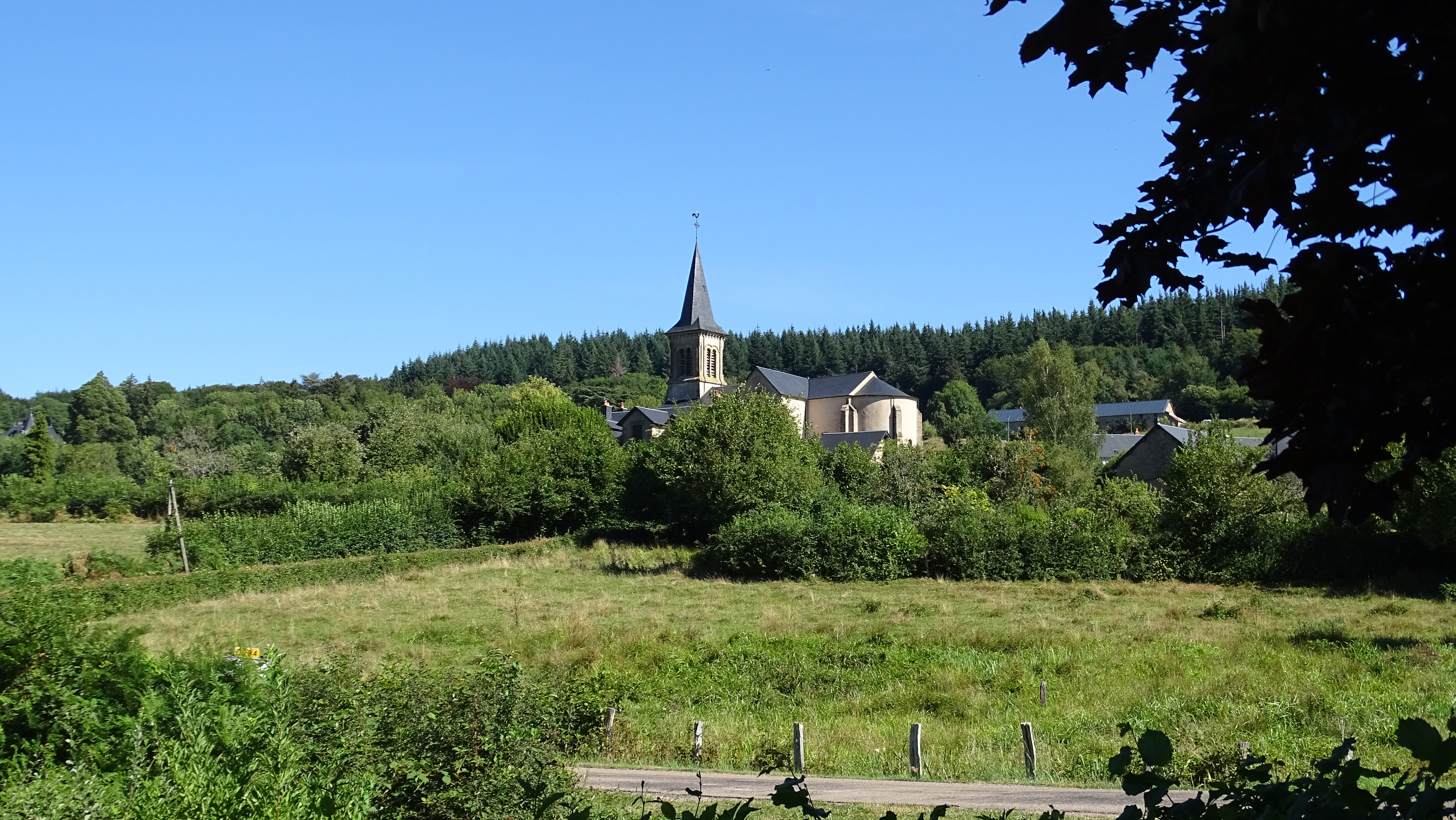
Nièvre, a rural department in the empty diagonal, is a prime example of France profonde. It first returned François Mitterrand to the National Assembly in 1946, before Le Monde noted it to be, in 1982, "this land and these men in contact with which he [is able to] measure the evolution of 'deep France'" following his election to the presidency. Rural Nièvre is the scenery of Mitterand's campaign poster, "La force tranquille", which alludes to the cliché of France profonde. In the 2022 presidential election, Marine Le Pen of the National Rally won Nièvre in both rounds.

La France profonde ("Deep France") is a phrase that denotes the existence of "deep" and profoundly "French" aspects in the culture of French provincial towns, of French village life and rural agricultural culture, which escape the "dominant ideologies" (Michel Dion's expression) and the hegemony of Paris (as well as other major cities).

The term was made more familiar to Anglophone readers as a result of Dion's 1988 radical critique La France profonde, predicting a union of de-communised socialism with a reformed Catholic Church. Although he used the historical regions of Lorraine and Mayenne as examples in his book, the term can be applied more widely. It was further popularised in Celia Brayfield's Deep France: A Writer's Year in La France profonde (2004) retitled in paperback Deep France: A Writer's Year in the Béarn. "Deep France" is seen to be profoundly localist in outlook and to be receding in the face of international mass culture. The term remains used in national politics, especially since the first election of Emmanuel Macron as President of France, which led to the subsequent yellow vests movement, which demanded, among other goals, an improved standard of living and improved government services for rural areas.

Albert Kahn's photographic and cinematographic studies at the beginning of the 20th century possibly for the first time helped depict French provincial life and in doing so gave some vision into "Deep France".

== See also ==
- Pure laine
- Merry England § Deep England
- Middle America
- The Discovery of France
