= 1976 in Cambodia =

- Decades: 1950s; 1960s; 1970s; 1980s; 1990s
- See also: Other events of 1976; List of years in Cambodia

The following lists events that happened during 1976 in Cambodia.

== Incumbents ==
- Chairman of State Presidium:
- Norodom Sihanouk (until 11 April)
- Khieu Samphan (starting 11 April)

- Prime Minister:
- Penn Nouth (until 4 April)
- Khieu Samphan (4-14 April)
- Pol Pot (14 April-27 September)
- Nuon Chea (27 September-25 October)
- Pol Pot (starting 25 October)

== Events ==
=== January ===
- January 5 - The government of Democratic Kampuchea was proclaimed and constituted as a Communist People's Republic, and a 250-member Assembly of the Representatives of the People of Kampuchea (PRA) was selected in March to choose the collective leadership of a State Presidium, the chairman of which became the head of state within the CPK, the Paris-educated leadership of Saloth Sâr (Pol Pot) was in control over Cambodia which had become Southeast Asia's secretive and most isolated totalitarian country from the rest of the world after North Korea which proceeded to implement the policy of Year Zero led by Angkar and its Khmer Rouge cadres, with these relationships were based on shared Marxist–Leninist and Maoist ideology, Democratic Kampuchea had very close ties with North Korea and China, while Burma (Myanmar) recognized the government.

=== March ===
- March 20 - Angkar had won total of 515 candidates for the 250 seats of Kampuchean People's Representative Assembly during the 1976 Cambodian general election with Pol Pot elected as the General Secretary, while Khieu Samphan was elected as President of the State Presidium, declared the nation's foreign policy as one of "independence, peace, neutrality, and nonalignment", Angkar's regime rapidly aligned itself along strict ideological lines which followed the steps of Mao and Stalin.

=== April ===
- April 2 - Norodom Sihanouk resigned as Head of State, after which he and his family were kept placed under house arrest by the Khmer Rouge, secretly broadcasting a farewell message, as he fled first to Pyongyang and then to Beijing in exile.

=== May ===
- May 1 - Tuol Svay Prey High School had transformed into "Security Prison 21" or S-21 was opened by the secret police (Santebal) of Angkar which became an extermination center, death camp for the Khmer Rouge guards to torture and kill others which included political prisoners and party cadres, with the executions first took place in the Killing Fields at Choeung Ek; all religious practices are banned in Cambodian society such as practice, worship and prayer, as many of Buddhist monks were labeled as "parasites" and forced to disrobe and perform hard manual labor, which estimates that 25,000 to 50,000 monks (including Huot Tat) were killed by Angkar, with 2,000 Buddhist temples (wats) were destroyed, desecrated, or repurposed as storage units, prisons, and even execution centers, the Khmer Rouge aimed to replace traditional spiritual identity with total loyalty to Angkar.

=== Unknown dates ===
- Tuol Svay Prey High School once named after a royal ancestor of King Norodom Sihanouk had turned into an extermination camp, torture, execution center, human slaughterhouse and prison renamed the complex "Tuol Sleng Prison" or "Security Prison 21" (S-21) and construction began to adapt the prison for the inmates by Santebal: the buildings in the deserted capital city of Phnom Penh were enclosed in electrified barbed wire, the classrooms converted into tiny prison and torture chambers, and all windows were covered with iron bars and barbed wire to prevent escapes and suicides once they are arrested and detained as political enemies, dissidents, party cadres including their entire extended families, soldiers of Lon Nol government as well as academics, doctors, teachers, students, factory workers, monks, engineers, etc, brought en masse to be interrogated and later executed at Choeung Ek near the killing field after S-21 has a long strict set of rules that was completely enforced by Angkar.

== Deaths ==
- April - Norodom Phurissara, Cambodian politician and member of the royal family
