= General Secretary of the Communist Party of Kampuchea =

Head of the Communist Party of Kampuchea

General Secretary of the Central Committee of the Communist Party of Kampuchea
- អគ្គលេខាធិការគណៈកម្មាធិការមជ្ឈិមបក្សកុម្មុយនិស្តកម្ពុជា
- Emblem of the Communist Party of Kampuchea

- Banner of the Communist Party of Kampuchea

- Last and longest in office Pol Pot; 22 February 1963 – 6 December 1981
- Central Committee of the Communist Party
- Type: Party leader
- Member of: Politburo; Secretariat
- Seat: Phnom Penh
- Appointer: Central Committee
- Formation: 30 September 1960; 66 years ago
- First holder: Tou Samouth
- Final holder: Pol Pot
- Abolished: 6 December 1981; 44 years ago

The General Secretary of the Central Committee of the Communist Party of Kampuchea (Khmer: អគ្គលេខាធិការគណៈកម្មាធិការមជ្ឈិមបក្សកុម្មុយនីស្តកម្ពុជា) was the highest office in the Communist Party of Kampuchea (CPK). The General Secretary was elected at plenary sessions of the party's Central Committee, and chaired the Secretariat and Politburo. The party was originally founded in 1951 as the "Kampuchean People's Revolutionary Party" (KPRP) that opposed French colonial rule until Cambodia finally gained its independence from France, two years later on 9 November 1953. The party's longest-serving General Secretary was Saloth Sâr who became known as "Pol Pot" (French for "Politique Potentielle"), following his return from Paris as a student of the French Communist Party in January 1953. He was known as "Brother Number One". The party was initially named the "Workers' Party of Kampuchea" (WPK) on 28 September 1960. The party was heavily inspired by Maoism and, particularly after 1965, adopted an agrarian form of communism heavily reliant on Chinese support of Chairman Mao. It was renamed the Communist Party of Kampuchea (CPK) in 1966. While the party initially used standard communist titles, its top leadership eventually became known as "Angkar" (Organization). Pol Pot’s primary goal for the capture of Phnom Penh on 17 April 1975 was the total overthrow of General Lon Nol’s US-backed Khmer Republic to clear the way for a radical revolution at the time when the Cambodian Civil War concluded, after the Khmer Rouge ("Cambodian Reds") moved into the capital, with "Angkar" came to power as the beginning of Year Zero, following the Operation Menu and Chenla backed by the Việt Cộng against the American imperialist forces in Southeast Asia. The office was abolished when the CPK dissolved in 1981, two years after being removed from power in the Vietnamese invasion of Cambodia.

== General secretaries ==
No.	Portrait	Name (Birth–Death)	Tenure			Notes
No.	Portrait	Name (Birth–Death)	Took office	Left office	Duration	Notes
1		Tou Samouth ទូ សាមុត (1915–1962)	30 September 1960	20 July 1962	1 year, 293 days	Inaugural officeholder; disappeared under disputed circumstances in July 1962.
2		Pol Pot ប៉ុល ពត (1925–1998)	22 February 1963	6 December 1981	18 years, 287 days	Elected in February 1963, maintained post until the dissolution in 1981. Under his leadership, the party's guerrilla branch, Khmer Rouge, succeeded in overthrowing US-backed military government of Lon Nol, and on 17 April 1975, established Democratic Kampuchea, an agrarian socialist dictatorship.

== See also ==
- Agrarian socialism
- Communist Youth League of Kampuchea
- Party of Democratic Kampuchea
