= Red Flag (magazine) =

Political magazine in China (1958–1998)

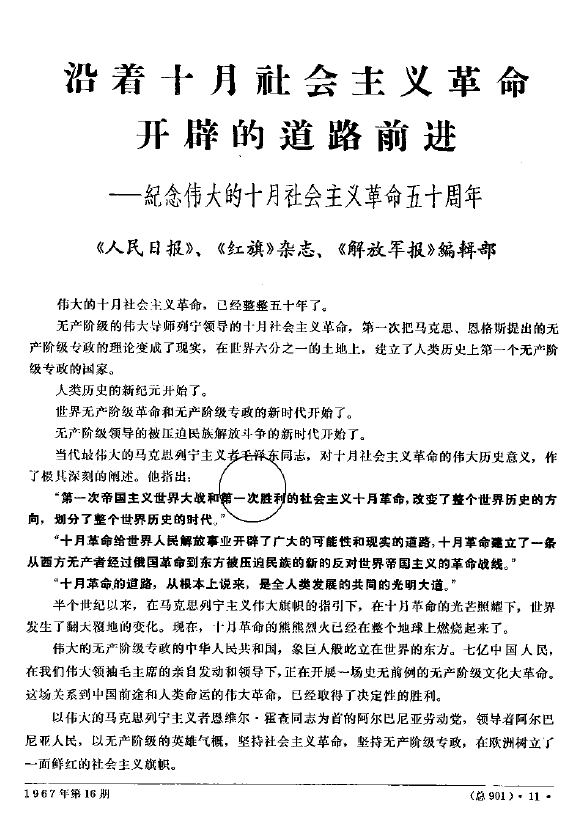
- December 1967 issue, "Advance along the Road Opened Up by the October Socialist Revolution"
- Categories: Political magazine
- Frequency: Bimonthly
- Publisher: Chinese Communist Party
- Founded: 1958
- Final issue: July 1988
- Country: China
- Based in: Beijing
- Language: Chinese
- ISSN: 0441-4381
- OCLC: 1752410

The Red Flag (Chinese: 红旗; pinyin: Hóngqí) was a journal on political theory, published by the Chinese Communist Party. It was one of the Two Newspapers and One Journal during the 1960s and 1970s. The newspapers were People's Daily and Guangming Daily. People's Liberation Army Daily is also regarded as one of them.

== History ==
Red Flag was started during the Great Leap Forward era in 1958. The journal was the successor to another journal, Study (Xuexi). The title of Red Flag was given by Mao Zedong. Chen Boda was the editor of the journal, which served as a crucial media outlet during the Cultural Revolution.

Red Flag was freely distributed in Hong Kong and Southeast Asia until 1958 when the "undesired" foreign publications were banned through the Undesirable Publications Ordinance. As a result, its circulation became 3,000 copies in contrast to 5,000 copies before the implementation of the law.

During the 1960s, Red Flag temporarily ended publication, but was restarted in 1968. Its frequency was redesigned as biweekly. Then it came out monthly until 1979. It was published bi-monthly from 1980 to 1988.

Red Flag covered theoretical arguments supported by the party. It also published articles on the views of the party about the Communist parties in other countries. For instance, in March 1963 the speech of Palmiro Togliatti, leader of the Italian Communist Party, at the 10th Congress was discussed and evaluated in detail.

In March 1966, the journal established an Academic Criticism Group, comprising Guan Feng, Wang Li, Mu Xin, Qi Benyu, Fan Ruoyu, and Du Jing (Fan Ruoyu and Du Jing were subsequently suspended), resulting in the de facto dissolution of the editorial committee. On 18 June 1966, Chen Boda arrived to Red Flag to "expose" the publication and suspended Fan Ruoyu and Xu Liqun from their positions. On 20 June 1966, the Cultural Revolution Group of Red Flag Magazine, led by Guan Feng, was formed to oversee the editorial operations of Red Flag and the publicity of Cultural Revolution.

In August 1967, Guan Feng and Wang Li were removed from their positions, and Chen Boda declared that Yao Wenyuan and Qi Benyu would participate in the editorial activities of Red Flag, while the Cultural Revolutionary Group of Red Flag Magazine was restructured as the Provisional Leadership Group of Red Flag Magazine. Red Flag Magazine ceased publication in the first half of 1968, resuming in July of that year.

In August 1968, Yao Wenyuan and Chen Boda jointly oversaw Red Flag Magazine, with Yao responsible for the editorial tasks. In August 1968, the provisional leadership of Red Flag Magazine was dissolved, and the Red Flag Magazine Service Group was established. In October 1968, the Workers' Propaganda Team and the Military Propaganda Team were assigned to Red Flag Magazine. In June 1969, the majority of Red Flag Magazine's staff had been transferred to the May 7th Cadre School, retaining only 12 personnel responsible for editorial duties. In September 1970, Chen Boda was removed from his position, and Yao Wenyuan assumed control of Red Flag, subsequently forming an editorial team to oversee the publication's editorial tasks.

In 1976, the Gang of Four, including Yao Wenyuan, was apprehended, marking the conclusion of the Cultural Revolution, and the magazine was restructured, with Wang Shu appointed as chief editor and Liu Zongzhuo as vice-chief editor.

Chinese officials announced in May 1988 that the journal would be closed. Finally, it ceased publication in June 1988, and was succeeded by Qiushi (Chinese: Seeking Truth).

== Other ==
In 1966, Pol Pot formed a similar magazine with the same name in Cambodia in Khmer, Tung Krahom, modelled on Red Flag.
