= Tong Kraham =

Tong Kraham (Khmer: ទង់ក្រហម, UNGEGN: Tóng Krâhâm [tɔŋ krɑːhɑːm]; lit. 'Red Flag') was a Cambodian journal, organ of the Communist Youth League of Kampuchea. The magazine was founded by Saloth Sar ('Pol Pot') when he returned to Cambodia in 1966. It was published in Khmer language and was named after a Chinese political magazine named Red Flag.
