= Kampuchean People's Representative Assembly =

Historic legislature of Cambodia

Kampuchean People's Representative Assembly សភាតំណាងប្រជាជនកម្ពុជា

Type
- Type: Unicameral

History
- Established: 5 January 1976
- Disbanded: 7 January 1979
- Preceded by: Parliament of the Khmer Republic
- Succeeded by: National Assembly

Leadership
- President of the State Presidium: Khieu Samphan
- President: Nuon Chea

Structure
- Seats: 250
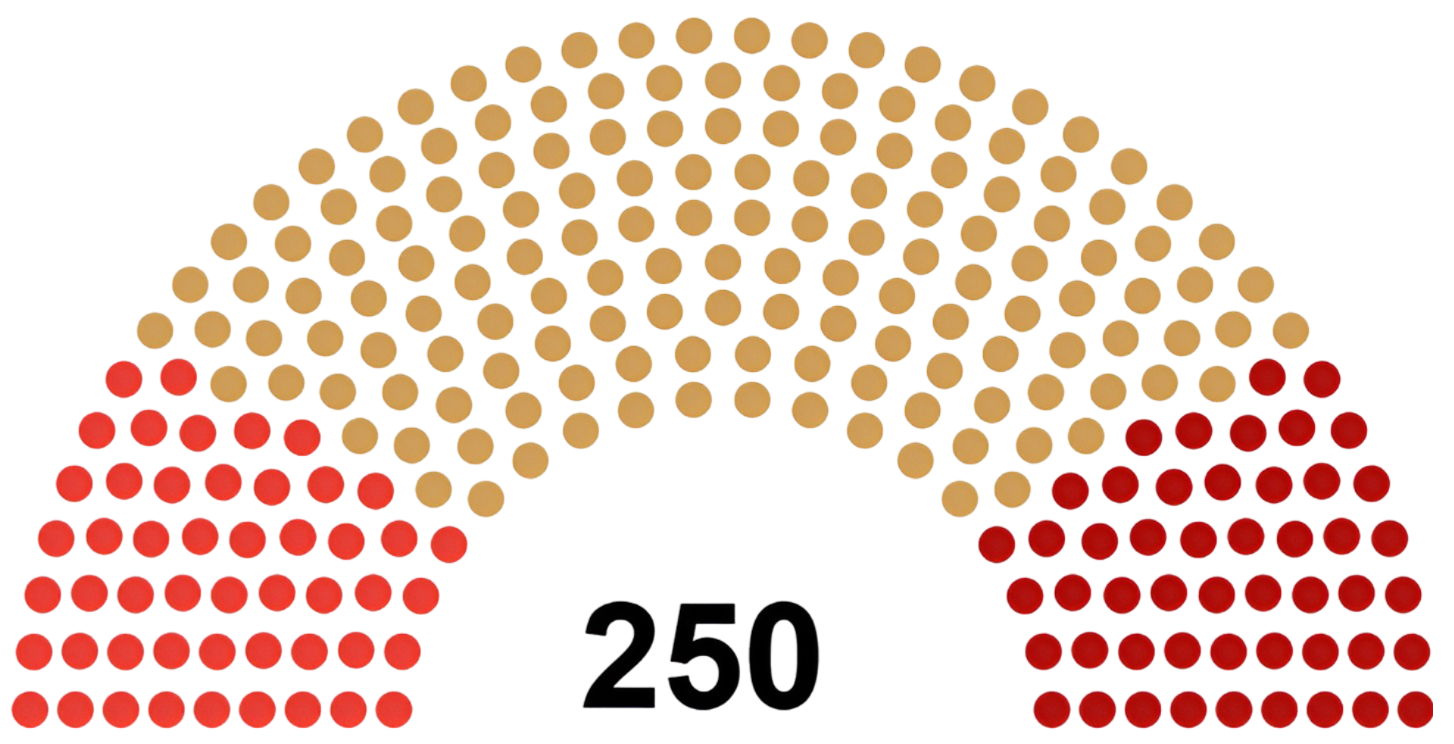
- Political groups: National United Front of Kampuchea: Peasants (150); Kampuchean Revolutionary Army (50); Labourers and "other working people" (50)

Elections
- Voting system: Secret ballot

The Kampuchean People's Representative Assembly (Khmer: សភាតំណាងប្រជាជនកម្ពុជា, Sâphéa Tâmnang Brâchéachôn Kâmpŭchéa) was the supreme state organ of power of Democratic Kampuchea. It was established as the official legislature of Kampuchea on 5 January 1976, consisting of 250 members.

== Composition ==
Of the seats, 150 were, due to the constitution, to be reserved for representatives of the peasants, 50 for the "laborers and other working people" and 50 for the Kampuchea Revolutionary Army. All representatives were to be elected simultaneously by secret ballot for five year terms, with the first and only elections taking place on 20 March 1976.

== History ==
The assembly held its first and only plenary session on 11 to 13 April, appointing the State Presidium, consisting of a president, a first vice president, and a second vice president, as well elected the "administration", the official government of Democratic Kampuchea, and the Standing Committee, due to represent the assembly when not gathered. The members of the KPRA were never elected; the Central Committee of the Communist Party of Kampuchea (CPK) appointed the chairman and other high officials both to it and to the State Praesidium. Plans for elections of members were discussed, but the 250 members of the KPRA were in fact appointed by the upper echelon of the CPK.

KPRA held no real legislative power. Unlike other political systems where legislative bodies could nominally pass laws or act as forums for debate, the KPRA was a tool for legitimizing decisions made by the ruling Khmer Rouge. All major policy decisions were orchestrated by CPK and by the Standing Committee led by Pol Pot, which wielded ultimate power. The KPRA's main function was to support these decisions without having any independent authority.

The assembly was effectively abolished when the Vietnamese captured Phnom Penh on 7 January 1979, establishing the People's Republic of Kampuchea.

== Results ==
Summary of the March 20, 1976 Kampuchean election results
List	Seats
Groups represented in the Assembly: Kampuchean Revolutionary Army; Labourers and "other working people"; Peasants	50; 50; 150
Total	250

Presidents of the Standing Committee of the Kampuchean People's Representative Assembly:

- Nuon Chea, 13 April 1976 – 7 January 1979
