= Communist Youth League of Kampuchea =

Communist Youth League of Kampuchea (Khmer: សម្ព័ន្ធយុវកុក, UNGEGN: Sâmpoănth Yŭvôkŏk) was a youth organization of Democratic Kampuchea (in present-day Cambodia) and the youth wing of the Communist Party of Kampuchea. The organization was initially called Democratic Youth League. It published Tong Kraham.
