= 1976 Cambodian general election =

- 20 March 1976

All 250 seats in the People's Representative Assembly 126 seats needed for a majority
- Turnout: 98%
	First party
Leader	Pol Pot
Party	Communist Party
Alliance	National United Front
Seats won	250
Percentage	100
- Results by constituency

General elections were held in Democratic Kampuchea on 20 March 1976, following the Khmer Rouge's victory over the Lon Nol government in April 1975. A total of 515 candidates for the 250 seats of Kampuchean People's Representative Assembly were put forward by the Communist-dominated National United Front of Kampuchea, 150 of whom were to be elected from among the peasantry, 50 from the industrial workers, and 50 from the Kampuchea Revolutionary Army. Following the election, the newly elected Assembly convened on 11 April, electing a new administration with General Secretary Pol Pot as Prime Minister and his interim predecessor Khieu Samphan as President of the State Presidium, ousting Prince of Cambodia Norodom Sihanouk. Voter turnout was reported to be 98%.

== Results ==
Party	Votes	%	Seats	+/–
National United Front of Kampuchea			250	New
Total			250	+124
Registered voters/turnout	3,462,868	98		
Source: Nohlen et al.
