= Liu Zongzhuo =

Chinese journalist (1920–2013)

Liu Zongzhuo (February 1920 - April 21, 2013, Chinese: 刘宗卓), a native of Xiangtan, Hunan, was a journalist from the People's Republic of China.

== Biography ==
In October 1938, Liu Zongzhuo enrolled in the Counter-Japanese Military and Political University and enlisted in the army, joining the Chinese Communist Party in November 1938. Liu Zongzhuo served as an officer in the political department of the Shandong Column of the Eighth Route Army, editor-in-chief of the Vanguard Newspaper of the Luzhong Military Region, and deputy director of the Publicity Department of the political department of the 35th Army of the Third Field in East China. He participated in the Battle of Boshan, Battle of Zhoucun, Battle of Lunan, Battle of Anqiu, Battle of Laiwu, Battle of Changhuai, Battle of Yancheng, Battle of Jinan, Battle of Huai-Hai and Yangtze River Crossing campaign.

After the founding of the People's Republic of China, Liu Zongzhuo served as chief editor of the People's Frontier Newspaper of the Political Department of the East China Third Field, deputy director of the Publicity Department of the Political Department of the Nanjing Military Region, director of the Policy Research Office of the Ministry of Culture, director of the Publicity Department of the CCP Shaanxi Provincial Committee, and deputy editor-in-chief of Red Flag; he was elected as a delegate to the Fifth National People's Congress in February 1978, and was transferred to the People's Liberation Army Newspaper in October 1978, where he served successively as deputy president and president. In 1983, he became vice chairman of the Third All-China Journalists Association.

On April 21, 2013, he died in Beijing at the age of 93 due to illness.
