= Xu Liqun =

Chinese politician

- 徐力群

Secretary-General of Standing Committee of the People's Congress of Ningxia Hui Autonomous Region
- In office January 2015 – April 2021
- Chairman: Zhang Yi; Li Jianhua; Shi Taifeng; Chen Run'er
- Preceded by: Yuan Jinlin
- Succeeded by: Wang Wenyu

Mayor of Zhongwei
- In office June 2007 – January 2015
- Party Secretary: Zhang Zhu; He Jian
- Preceded by: Li Rui
- Succeeded by: Wan Xinheng

Personal details
- Born: May 1959 (age 67) Pingluo County, Ningxia, China
- Party: Chinese Communist Party (1984–2021; expelled)
- Education: Inner Mongolia University of Science and Technology; Ningxia Radio and Television University; Northwest University of Politics and Law; Central Party School of the Chinese Communist Party

Xu Liqun (Chinese: 徐力群; pinyin: Xú Lìqún; born May 1959) is a former Chinese politician who spent most of his career in northwest China's Ningxia Hui Autonomous Region. He was investigated by China's top anti-graft agency in November 2020. Previously he served as secretary-general of Standing Committee of the People's Congress of Ningxia Hui Autonomous Region.

== Biography ==
Xu was born in Pingluo County, Ningxia, in May 1959. At the end of the Cultural Revolution, he became a sent-down youth at Honghua People's Commune (红花人民公社; 'Red Flower People's Commune') in the suburb of Yinchuan. In 1978, he was admitted to Baotou University of Iron Steel Technology (now Inner Mongolia University of Science & Technology), majoring in industrial and civil buildings. He joined the Chinese Communist Party (CCP) in December 1984.

After graduation in 1981, he was despatched to Yinchuan Real Estate Administration Bureau, where he was promoted to deputy director in October 1994 and to director in April 1999. He was appointed party secretary of Jinfeng District in November 2002, concurrently serving as secretary of the Party Working Committee of Yinchuan High Tech Industrial Development Zone. He was appointed vice mayor of Guyuan in August 2003 and was admitted to member of the standing committee of the CPC Guyuan Committee, the city's top authority. In June 2007, he was named acting mayor of Zhongwei, succeeding Li Rui. He was installed as mayor in December. He was secretary-general of Standing Committee of the People's Congress of Ningxia Hui Autonomous Region in January 2018, and held that office until April 2021.

=== Downfall ===
In November 2020, he was placed under investigation by the Central Commission for Discipline Inspection (CCDI), the party's internal disciplinary body, and the National Supervisory Commission, the highest anti-corruption agency of China.

On January 26, 2021, his qualification for delegate to the 12th Ningxia People's Congress was terminated. On April 27, he was expelled from the Communist Party and dismissed from public office. He was detained by Supreme People's Procuratorate on May 10. On August 31, he stood trial at the Intermediate People's Court of Wuzhong on charges of taking bribes. He allegedly took advantage of his position to benefit various companies and individuals on matters related to project contracting between 2005 and 2019. In return, he accepted money and gifts worth more than 6.95 million yuan (about 109 million U.S. dollars) and 10000 U.S. dollars. On November 19, he was sentenced to 11 years and 6 months and fined one million yuan on taking bribes and illegal possession of firearms. His illegal gains will be confiscated and his case transferred to the judiciary. Four vice mayors of Zhongwei, namely Yu Xia (于霞; 2004–2009), Wang Xingde (王兴德; 2006–2007), Liu Zhonghu (刘仲虎; 2012–2013), Zuo Xinbo (左新波; 2012–2016), were also sacked for graft.

Government offices
Preceded by Li Rui	Mayor of Zhongwei; 2007–2015	Succeeded by Wan Xinheng
Assembly seats
Preceded by Yuan Jinlin	Secretary-General of Standing Committee of the People's Congress of Ningxia Hui Autonomous Region; 2015–2021	Succeeded by Wang Wenyu (王文宇)
