= Foreign relations of Cambodia =

The Cambodian government has diplomatic relations with most countries. The government is a member of most major international organizations, including the United Nations and its specialized agencies such as the World Bank and International Monetary Fund. The government is an Asian Development Bank (ADB) member, a member of ASEAN, and of the WTO. In 2005 Cambodia attended the inaugural East Asia Summit. The government is also a member of the Pacific Alliance (as observer) and Shanghai Cooperation Organisation (as dialogue partner).

== International disputes ==
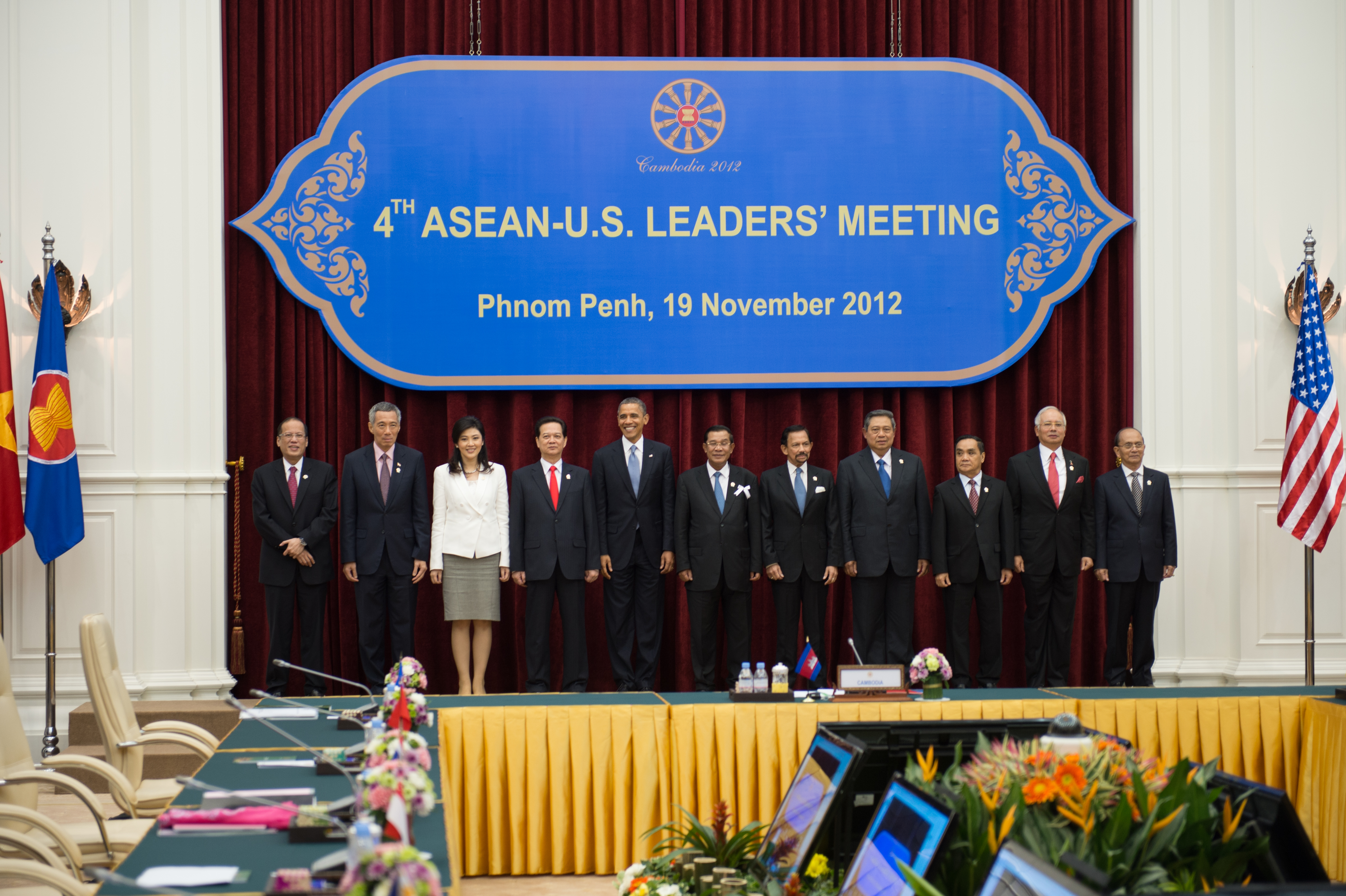
Delegates of the ASEAN Summit pose for a photograph at the Peace Palace in Phnom Penh, Cambodia, on 19 November 2012.

Cambodia is involved in a dispute regarding offshore islands and sections of the boundary with Vietnam. In addition, the maritime boundary Cambodia has with Vietnam is undefined. Parts of Cambodia's border with Thailand are indefinite, and the maritime boundary with Thailand is not clearly defined.

== Illicit drugs ==
Cambodia is a transshipment site for Golden Triangle heroin, and possibly a site of money laundering. There is corruption related to narcotics in parts of the government, military and police. Cambodia is also a possible site of small-scale opium, heroin, and amphetamine production. The country is a large producer of cannabis for the international market.

== International organization participation ==
ACCT, AsDB, ASEAN, ASEAN-Japan Centre, ESCAP, FAO, G-77, IAEA, IBRD, ICAO, ICC, ICRM, IDA, IFAD, IFC, IFRCS, ILO, IMF, IMO, Intelsat (nonsignatory user), International Monetary Fund, Interpol, IOC, ISO (subscriber), ITU, NAM, OPCW, PCA, UN, UNCTAD, UNESCO, UNIDO, UPU, WB, WFTU, WHO, WIPO, WMO, WTO, WToO, WTrO (applicant)

== Diplomatic relations ==
List of countries which Cambodia maintains diplomatic relations with:

| # | Country | Date |
|---|---|---|
| 1 | Costa Rica | 1 May 1950 |
| 2 | United States | 11 July 1950 |
| 3 | Thailand | 19 December 1950 |
| 4 | Italy | 27 July 1951 |
| 5 | Liberia | 16 November 1951 |
| 6 | Spain | 16 November 1951 |
| 7 | Australia | 15 January 1952 |
| 8 | United Kingdom | 5 May 1952 |
| 9 | Pakistan | 28 May 1952 |
| 10 | Sri Lanka | 28 May 1952 |
| 11 | India | 30 May 1952 |
| 12 | France | 4 November 1952 |
| 13 | Egypt | 30 March 1953 |
| 14 | Japan | 4 May 1954 |
| 15 | Belgium | 8 June 1955 |
| 16 | Myanmar | 12 July 1955 |
| 17 | Austria | 21 February 1956 |
| 18 | Denmark | 29 February 1956 |
| 19 | Laos | 15 June 1956 |
| 20 | Serbia | 15 July 1956 |
| 21 | Russia | 6 November 1956 |
| 22 | Czech Republic | 16 April 1957 |
| 23 | Poland | 16 April 1957 |
| 24 | Philippines | 27 August 1957 |
| 25 | Malaysia | 31 August 1957 |
| 26 | Netherlands | 11 November 1957 |
| 27 | China | 19 July 1958 |
| 28 | Indonesia | 13 February 1959 |
| 29 | Israel | 16 February 1959 |
| 30 | New Zealand | 18 February 1959 |
| 31 | Cuba | 15 April 1960 |
| 32 | Bulgaria | 18 September 1960 |
| 33 | Brazil | 8 November 1960 |
| 34 | Mongolia | 30 November 1960 |
| 35 | Sweden | 18 January 1961 |
| 36 | Albania | 5 September 1962 |
| 37 | Romania | 10 January 1963 |
| 38 | Switzerland | 26 March 1963 |
| 39 | Lebanon | 13 July 1963 |
| 40 | Hungary | 22 July 1963 |
| 41 | Germany | 19 February 1964 |
| 42 | North Korea | 20 December 1964 |
| 43 | Singapore | 15 September 1965 |
| 44 | Mauritania | 29 October 1965 |
| 45 | Argentina | 1 February 1966 |
| 46 | Algeria | 2 December 1966 |
| 47 | Vietnam | 24 June 1967 |
| 48 | Yemen | 19 March 1968 |
| 49 | Senegal | 27 March 1969 |
| 50 | Turkey | 3 May 1969 |
| 51 | Mali | 10 June 1969 |
| 52 | Guinea | June 1969 |
| 53 | Finland | 20 January 1970 |
| 54 | South Korea | 18 May 1970 |
| 55 | Bangladesh | 6 June 1972 |
| 56 | Democratic Republic of the Congo | 5 October 1972 |
| 57 | Cameroon | 13 October 1972 |
| 58 | Colombia | 1 August 1973 |
| 59 | Somalia | 16 August 1973 |
| 60 | Jordan | September 1974 |
| 61 | Nepal | 18 April 1975 |
| 62 | Mozambique | 25 June 1975 |
| 63 | Guyana | 5 September 1975 |
| 64 | Mexico | 26 September 1975 |
| 65 | Angola | 4 December 1975 |
| 66 | Peru | 31 May 1976 |
| 67 | Chile | 1 June 1976 |
| 68 | Greece | 1 August 1976 |
| 69 | Norway | 18 November 1976 |
| 70 | Iraq | 10 January 1978 |
| 71 | Ethiopia | 15 September 1979 |
| 72 | Cape Verde | 23 March 1984 |
| 73 | Gabon | 1985 |
| 74 | Libya | 16 February 1990 |
| 75 | Canada | 25 November 1991 |
| 76 | Eswatini | 13 December 1991 |
| — | State of Palestine | 17 December 1991 |
| 77 | Ukraine | 23 April 1992 |
| 78 | Portugal | 29 May 1992 |
| 79 | Iran | 5 June 1992 |
| 80 | Brunei | 9 June 1992 |
| — | Sovereign Military Order of Malta | 1992 |
| 81 | Malta | 6 June 1993 |
| 82 | Kazakhstan | 25 February 1994 |
| 83 | Nicaragua | 10 March 1994 |
| — | Holy See | 25 March 1994 |
| 84 | Bolivia | 26 April 1994 |
| 85 | Burundi | 15 May 1994 |
| 86 | Venezuela | 18 June 1994 |
| 87 | Ecuador | 29 June 1994 |
| 88 | Kuwait | 16 July 1994 |
| 89 | Uruguay | 29 September 1994 |
| 90 | Papua New Guinea | 7 October 1994 |
| 91 | United Arab Emirates | 21 October 1994 |
| 92 | Paraguay | 27 October 1994 |
| 93 | Belize | 1 November 1994 |
| 94 | Georgia | 17 November 1994 |
| 95 | Sudan | 5 January 1995 |
| 96 | Benin | 23 January 1995 |
| 97 | South Africa | 26 January 1995 |
| 98 | Azerbaijan | 2 February 1995 |
| 99 | Tanzania | 8 March 1995 |
| 100 | Moldova | 10 March 1995 |
| 101 | Kyrgyzstan | 20 March 1995 |
| 102 | Turkmenistan | 6 April 1995 |
| 103 | Tunisia | 12 April 1995 |
| 104 | Federated States of Micronesia | 2 May 1995 |
| 105 | Mauritius | 18 May 1995 |
| 106 | Ghana | 24 May 1995 |
| 107 | Armenia | 18 August 1995 |
| 108 | Uzbekistan | 7 September 1995 |
| 109 | Maldives | 21 September 1995 |
| 110 | Latvia | 22 September 1995 |
| 111 | Lithuania | 22 September 1995 |
| 112 | Vanuatu | 26 September 1995 |
| 113 | Belarus | 25 October 1995 |
| 114 | Tajikistan | 29 November 1995 |
| 115 | Panama | 15 February 1996 |
| 116 | Guatemala | 26 February 1996 |
| 117 | Honduras | 26 February 1996 |
| 118 | Zambia | 8 May 1996 |
| 119 | Slovenia | 16 July 1996 |
| 120 | Seychelles | 15 August 1996 |
| 121 | Croatia | 10 September 1996 |
| 122 | Morocco | 23 October 1996 |
| 123 | North Macedonia | 29 October 1996 |
| 124 | Slovakia | 20 February 1997 |
| 125 | Madagascar | 25 March 1997 |
| 126 | Ireland | 30 October 1999 |
| 127 | Cyprus | 16 August 2000 |
| 128 | Republic of the Congo | 13 September 2000 |
| 129 | Nigeria | 28 May 2001 |
| 130 | Zimbabwe | 30 June 2001 |
| 131 | Luxembourg | 15 May 2002 |
| 132 | Timor-Leste | 29 July 2002 |
| 133 | Iceland | 19 June 2003 |
| 134 | Bosnia and Herzegovina | 23 December 2003 |
| 135 | Estonia | 31 August 2005 |
| 136 | Rwanda | 29 September 2005 |
| 137 | Andorra | 8 March 2006 |
| 138 | Nauru | 25 April 2007 |
| 139 | Qatar | 1 April 2008 |
| 140 | Ivory Coast | 9 April 2008 |
| 141 | Dominican Republic | 13 November 2008 |
| 142 | Bahrain | 29 June 2009 |
| 143 | Kenya | 4 July 2009 |
| 144 | Montenegro | 12 October 2009 |
| 145 | Palau | 26 October 2009 |
| 146 | Oman | 16 November 2009 |
| 147 | Jamaica | 12 January 2010 |
| 148 | Saint Vincent and the Grenadines | 12 January 2010 |
| 149 | El Salvador | 16 January 2010 |
| 150 | Saudi Arabia | 18 January 2010 |
| 151 | Eritrea | 2 February 2010 |
| 152 | Chad | 9 February 2010 |
| 153 | Comoros | 22 February 2010 |
| 154 | Dominica | 27 April 2010 |
| 155 | Antigua and Barbuda | 28 April 2010 |
| 156 | Gambia | 28 April 2010 |
| 157 | Samoa | 18 May 2010 |
| 158 | Fiji | 27 May 2010 |
| 159 | Namibia | 25 June 2010 |
| 160 | Equatorial Guinea | 30 June 2010 |
| 161 | Guinea-Bissau | 30 June 2010 |
| 162 | Burkina Faso | 2 July 2010 |
| 163 | Togo | 6 August 2010 |
| 164 | Sierra Leone | 7 October 2010 |
| 165 | Syria | 25 October 2010 |
| 166 | San Marino | 12 April 2011 |
| 167 | Liechtenstein | 8 June 2011 |
| 168 | Tuvalu | 28 June 2011 |
| 169 | Malawi | 20 July 2011 |
| 170 | South Sudan | 22 July 2011 |
| 171 | Suriname | 31 October 2011 |
| 172 | Solomon Islands | 22 February 2012 |
| 173 | Djibouti | 28 April 2016 |
| 174 | Marshall Islands | 20 January 2017 |
| 175 | Saint Kitts and Nevis | 16 November 2018 |
| 176 | Monaco | 11 July 2019 |
| 177 | Barbados | 11 November 2019 |
| 178 | Uganda | 23 January 2020 |
| — | Cook Islands | 14 May 2025 |
| 179 | Saint Lucia | 26 September 2025 |
| 180 | Niger | 26 September 2026 |
| 181 | Bhutan | 14 October 2026 |
| 182 | Afghanistan | Unknown |
| — | Sahrawi Arab Democratic Republic | Unknown |

== Bilateral relations ==
=== Americas ===
| Country | Formal relations began in | Notes |
|---|---|---|
| Canada | 25 November 1991 | See Cambodia–Canada relations: Cambodia is accredited to Canada from its Permanent Mission to the United Nations in New York City.; Canada is accredited to Cambodia from its embassy in Bangkok, Thailand. |
| Mexico | September 1976 | Cambodia is accredited to Mexico from its embassy in Washington, D.C., United States.; Mexico is accredited to Cambodia from its embassy in Hanoi, Vietnam. |
| United States | 11 July 1950 | See Cambodia–United States relations: Cambodia has an embassy in Washington, D.C.; United States has an embassy in Phnom Penh. |

=== Asia ===
| Country | Formal relations began | Notes |
|---|---|---|
| Brunei | 9 June 1992 | See Brunei–Cambodia relations: Brunei has an embassy in Phnom Penh.; Cambodia has an embassy in Bandar Seri Begawan.; The relations are mainly on economics and security. |
| China (PRC) | 19 July 1958 | See Cambodia–China relations: Cambodia and the People's Republic of China relations have strengthened considerably after the end of the Cambodian-Vietnamese War.; Cambodia has an embassy in Beijing.; China has an embassy in Phnom Penh |
| India | 1981 | See Cambodia–India relations: Cambodia and India have ties that go deep into history, in areas of religion, architecture, art, political systems and royal families.; India has an embassy in Phnom Penh.; Cambodia has an embassy in New Delhi. |
| Indonesia | 1957 | See Cambodia–Indonesia relations: The relations between both countries dates back to the Pre-Angkorian and Srivijaya era.; Indonesia has an embassy in Phnom Penh; Cambodia has an embassy in Jakarta |
| Israel | 1960; 1993 (reestablished) | See Cambodia–Israel relations: Israel has an embassy in Bangkok. |
| Japan | 4 May 1954 | See Cambodia–Japan relations: Japan has an embassy in Phnom Penh and a consulate general in Siem Reap.; Cambodia has an embassy in Tokyo.; Both Countries relations that in 1946, King Norodom Sihanouk said that Japan do not need to pay for the destruction since 1940, he said Cambodia wanted to be allied with Japan. |
| Laos | 15 June 1956 | See Cambodia–Laos relations: Laos has an embassy in Phnom Penh.; Cambodia has an embassy in Vientiane.; Historically, relations have been tense, with long-standing unresolved border disputes. |
| Malaysia | 2 December 1996 | See Cambodia–Malaysia relations: The relations are mainly in economic.; Malaysia was the fourth largest foreign investors to Cambodian in 2009. |
| North Korea | 28 December 1964 | See Cambodia–North Korea relations |
| Pakistan | | See Cambodia–Pakistan relations: Cambodia is accredited to Pakistan from its embassy in New Delhi, India.; Pakistan has an embassy in Phnom Penh. |
| Philippines | 1956 | See Cambodia–Philippines relations Philippine President Rodrigo Duterte with King Norodom Sihamoni at the Royal Palace in Phnom Penh on 14 December 2016.: The two countries have an agreements on economic and trade relations, agricultural and agribusiness collaboration, and tourism cooperation.; Cambodia has an embassy in Manila.; Philippines has an embassy in Phnom Penh. |
| Singapore | 10 August 1965 | See Cambodia–Singapore relations: Cambodia was one of the first countries to recognize Singapore's sovereignty when it became independent in 1965.; Prime Minister Lee Hsien Loong visited Cambodia in 2005 and 2012.; Singapore has an embassy in Phnom Penh.; Cambodia has an embassy in Singapore. |
| South Korea | 18 May 1970 | King Norodom Sihamoni granting an audience to President of South Korea Lee Myung-bak in 2009. See Cambodia–South Korea relations: Cambodia has an embassy in Seoul.; South Korea has an embassy in Phnom Penh. |
| Tajikistan | 1956 | Cambodia embassy in Ankara, Turkey is presented for Tajikistan. |
| Thailand | | See Cambodia–Thailand relations: Cambodian–Thai border dispute; The Kingdom of Thailand has an embassy in Phnom Penh.; The Kingdom of Cambodia has an embassy in Bangkok.; Relationship between the two countries remains a sensitive and a complex topic and is often strained due to cultural rivalries and territorial disputes. |
| Turkey | 1959 | See Cambodia–Turkey relations: Cambodia has an embassy in Ankara.; Turkey has an embassy in Phnom Penh.; Trade volume between the two countries was US$108.4 million in 2015 (Cambodian exports/imports: 94.7/13.7 million USD). |
| Vietnam | | See Cambodia–Vietnam relations: Bilateral relations between the Cambodia and Vietnam were for long strained due to the Cambodian-Vietnamese War.; The maritime boundary with Vietnam is hampered by unresolved dispute over sovereignty of offshore islands.; Cambodia has an embassy in Hanoi.; Vietnam has an embassy in Phnom Penh. |

=== Europe ===
| Country | Formal relations began | Notes |
|---|---|---|
| Denmark | 9 October 1967 | See Cambodia–Denmark relations: Cambodia is accredited to Denmark from its embassy in London, United Kingdom.; Denmark is accredited to Cambodia from its embassy in Bangkok, Thailand. |
| Finland | 20 January 1970 | Finland recognized Cambodia on 19 December 1969. Diplomatic relations established on 20 January 1970, re-established 9 August 1976.; Cambodia is represented in Finland through its embassy in London, United Kingdom; Finland is represented in Cambodia through its embassy in Bangkok, Thailand |
| France | 1863 | See Cambodia–France relations: French president Charles de Gaulle visited Cambodia in 1966 and was given a welcome by Prince Norodom Sihanouk.; Cambodia has an embassy in Paris.; France has an embassy in Phnom Penh. |
| Germany | | See Cambodia–Germany relations: Cambodia has an embassy in Berlin.; Germany has an embassy in Phnom Penh. |
| Greece | | Cambodia's embassy in Brussels, Belgium is also accredited to Greece; Greece's embassy in Bangkok is also accredited to Cambodia.; Both countries are full members of the Francophonie. |
| Netherlands | 11 November 1957 | See Cambodia–Netherlands relations: Cambodia's embassy in Brussels, Belgium is also accredited to the Netherlands; The Netherlands's embassy in Bangkok is also accredited to Cambodia |
| Poland | 29 March 1992 | Poland closed its embassy in Phnom Penh at 2009 and accredited from Bangkok, Thailand.; Cambodia is accredited to Poland from its embassy in Berlin, Germany. |
| Switzerland | 1957 | Switzerland recognized Cambodia in 1957, and the two countries have maintained diplomatic relations since 1963.; Bilateral relations between Cambodia and Switzerland are good. Switzerland supports the transition process and development efforts in Cambodia.; Trade between the two countries is marginal. |
| Ukraine | 23 April 1992 | See Cambodia–Ukraine relations: Cambodia is accredited to Ukraine from its embassy in Berlin, Germany.; Ukraine is accredited to Cambodia from its embassy in Hanoi, Vietnam. |
| United Kingdom | 1952; 1976 (reestablished) | See Cambodia–United Kingdom relations British Foreign Secretary David Lammy with Cambodian Social Minister Chea Somethy in London, March 2025. Cambodia established diplomatic relations with the United Kingdom on 5 May 1952.: Cambodia maintains an embassy in London.; The United Kingdom is accredited to Cambodia through its embassy in Phnom Penh.; Both countries share common membership of the International Criminal Court, and the World Trade Organization. Bilaterally the two countries have a Development Partnership. |

=== Oceania ===
| Country | Formal relations began | Notes |
|---|---|---|
| Australia | 1950s | See Australia–Cambodia relations: Australia has an embassy in Phnom Penh.; Cambodia has an embassy in Canberra. |

== See also ==
- List of diplomatic missions in Cambodia
- List of diplomatic missions of Cambodia
