= Cambodia–United Kingdom relations =

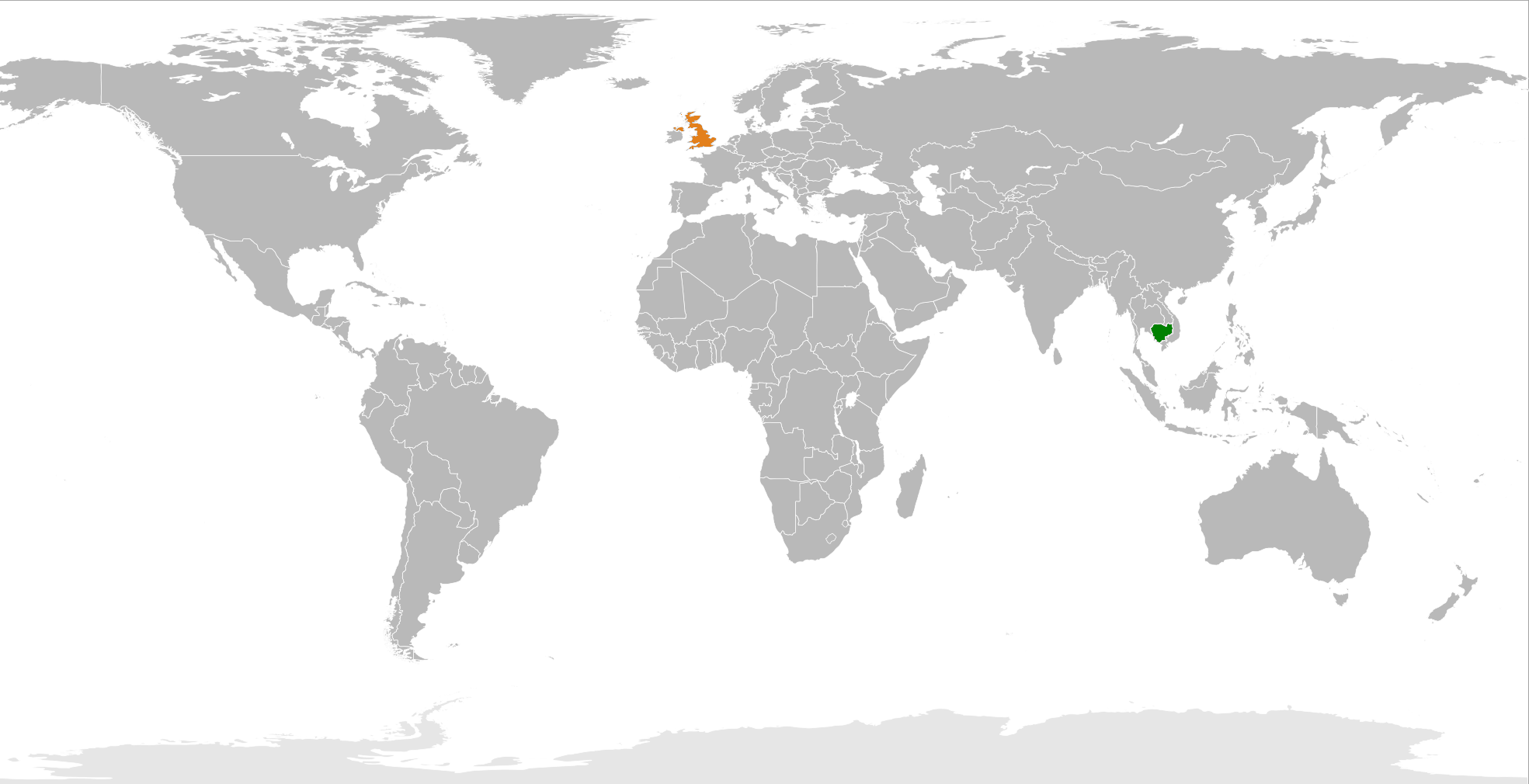

- Cambodia: United Kingdom

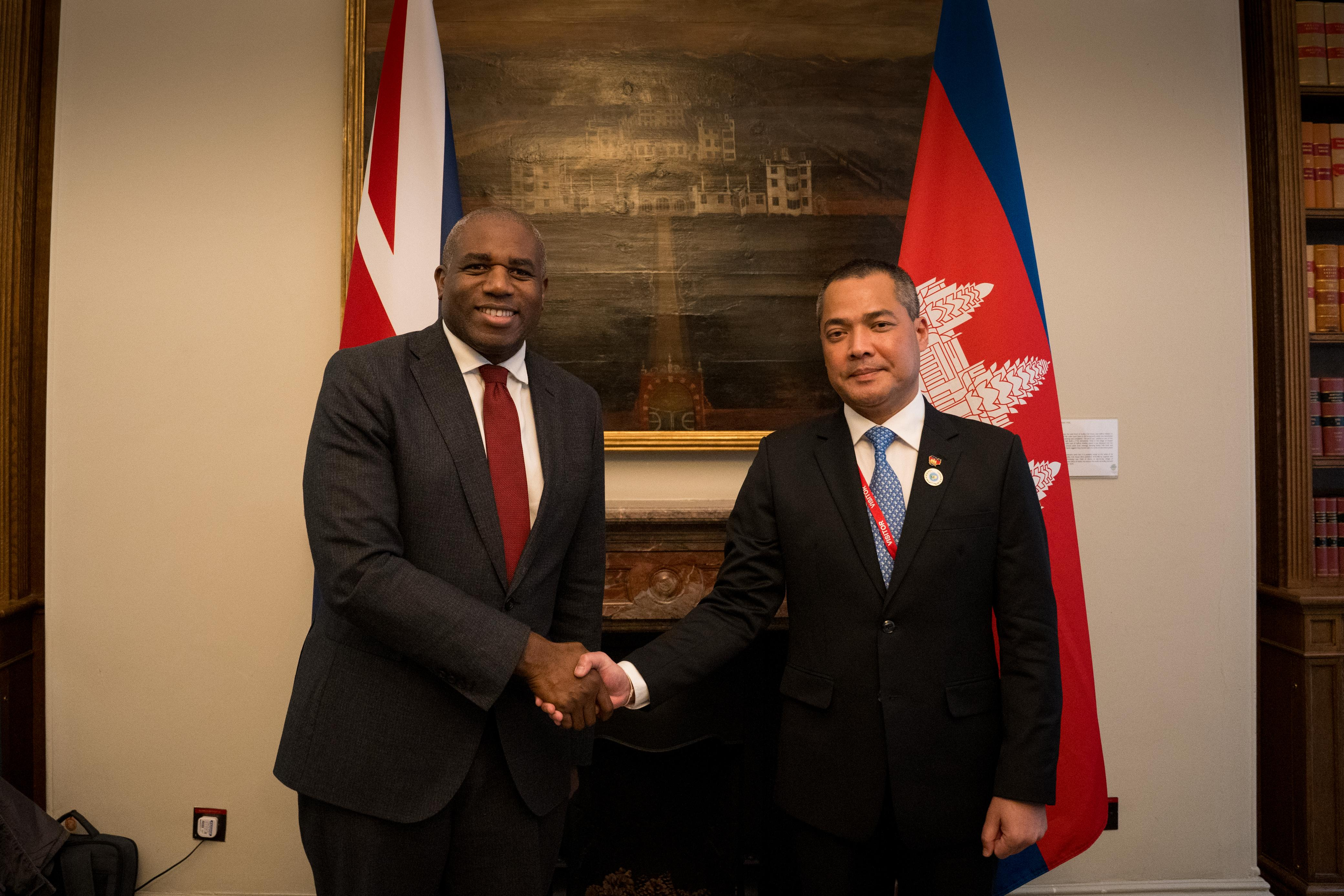
British Foreign Secretary David Lammy with Cambodian Social Minister Chea Somethy in London, March 2025.

Cambodia–United Kingdom relations refer to the bilateral relations between Cambodia and the United Kingdom. Both countries established diplomatic relations on 5 May 1953, following Cambodia's independence from France.

Both countries share common membership of the International Criminal Court, and the World Trade Organization. Bilaterally the two countries have a Development Partnership.

== History ==
Since 1953 Cambodia and the United Kingdom have bilateral relations, that was the year Cambodia achieved full independence from France. Despite geopolitical events in Southeast Asia during the Cold War, both countries maintained their diplomatic relations.

In 1975 the Khmer Rouge gained power in Cambodia. The UK was the first country to condemn the human rights record in Cambodia in 1978. Despite the absence of formal relations, the UK continued to take part in the humanitarian efforts related to refugees in Cambodia, it also assisted in attempts to resolve the Cambodian conflict.

In 1992, the UK contributed personnel to the United Nations Transitional Authority in Cambodia (UNTAC) helping Cambodia's transition to peace and democratic government. In 1991 diplomatic relations were resumed and in 1993 the British embassy was reponed in Phnom Penh. 2023 saw the celebrations of their 70 anniversary of diplomatic relations.

== UK assistance ==
The United Kingdom is a significant contributor to the Extraordinary Chambers in the Courts of Cambodia.

The UK contributes to Cambodia around £10m per year, mainly to promote democratic reform, human rights and good governance, health, education, urban poverty projects, the development of rural livelihoods, and to tackle the growing problems of pedophilia, people trafficking, forestry crime, and the spread of HIV.

== Diplomatic relations ==
- Cambodia maintains an embassy in London.
- The United Kingdom is accredited to Cambodia through its embassy in Phnom Penh.

The British embassy was opened in Phnom Penh in 1953 until March 1975, a month before the Khmer Rouge takeover. It was reopened in 1991 following the signing of the Paris Peace Accords.

== See also ==
- Foreign relations of Cambodia
- Foreign relations of the United Kingdom
