= Battle of Phnom Penh =

Battle of Phnom Penh may refer to events in the following conflicts:

- Cambodian–Dutch War (1643–1644)
- Fall of Phnom Penh (1975)
- Cambodian–Vietnamese War (1978–1979)
