= Cambodia–Denmark relations =

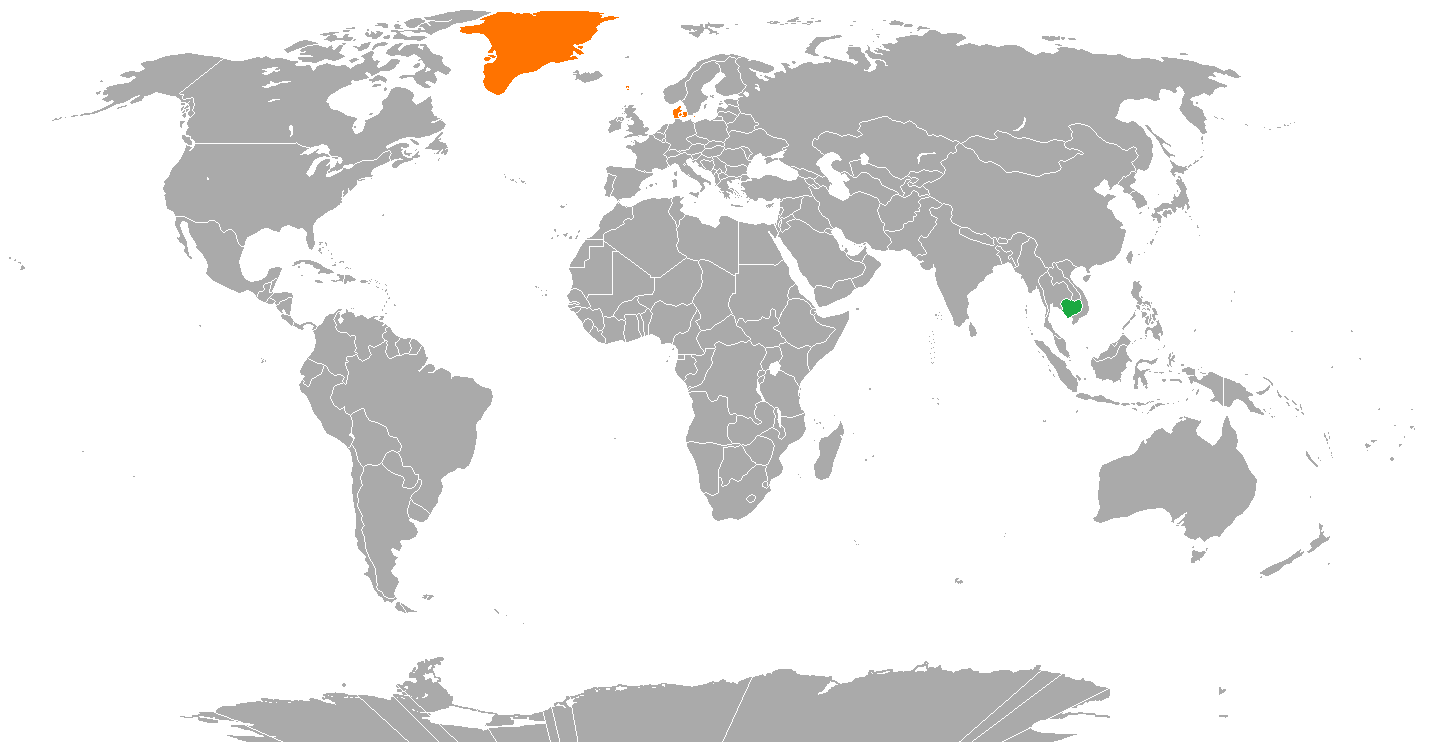
- Cambodia: Denmark

Cambodia–Denmark relations refers to the bilateral relations between Cambodia and Denmark. Cambodia is represented in Denmark by its embassy in London, United Kingdom. Denmark is represented in Cambodia by its embassy in Bangkok, Thailand.

== History ==
In 1997, Denmark and Cambodia signed an agreement on development cooperation in the areas of the environment and natural resources. In 2001, the first bilateral technical consultations on the cooperation were held in Phnom Penh, and an agreement was signed for the implementation of a five-year environmental support program with a total official development assistance (ODA) budget of over DKK 240 million. On 3 September 2002, Denmark established a representative office in Phnom Penh.

In 2011, the Danish government decided to gradually phase out its ODA to Asia over a two-year period. As a consequence, the representative office in Phnom Penh was closed in June 2013.

Since June 2013, Denmark has been represented in Cambodia through its embassy in Bangkok, Thailand.

== Aid to Cambodia ==
Danish development assistance to Cambodia includes a number of efforts undertaken by several Danish organizations.

Denmark continues to support human rights, democracy, and good governance in Cambodia. The Danish International Development Agency (DANIDA) is the official development assistance organization for the State of Denmark, when the country operates aid across the world. DANIDA maintains a zero tolerance policy against corruption and bribery. On 23 March 2009, a multi-donor funded Trade Development Support Program for Cambodia was launched, with DANIDA’s private sector development program contributing DKK 39.3 million. This was the last bilateral aid program between Denmark and Cambodia and in 2011, the Danish government decided to out-phase its foreign aid to Asia over a two-year period. In 2013, DANIDA officially ceased funding for development

DanChurchAid (DCA) is active in Cambodia with projects aimed at strengthening women's rights, Lgbtqia+ rights public access to information, food security, hunger prevention, land rights, disaster response, and climate change adaptation.

A total of 700 million Danish Kroner were provided to Cambodia, from 1992 to 2013.

== Resident diplomatic missions ==
- Cambodia is accredited to Denmark from its embassy in London, the United Kingdom.
- Denmark is accredited to Cambodia from its embassy in Bangkok, Thailand.

== See also ==
- Foreign relations of Cambodia
- Foreign relations of Denmark

== Sources ==
- "Danida i Cambodja". Danmark i Cambodja (in Danish). Ministry of Foreign Affairs of Denmark. Archived from the original on 5 November 2016.
- "Denmark". Cambodian Rehabilitation and Development Board (CRDB) Council for the Development of Cambodia (CDC). Overview of bilateral high level consultations.
- "Denmark Aide Memoire 2013 R" (PDF) (in Khmer). Royal Embassy of Cambodia. 2013. Archived from the original (PDF) on 21 June 2016.
