= Cambodia–Turkey relations =

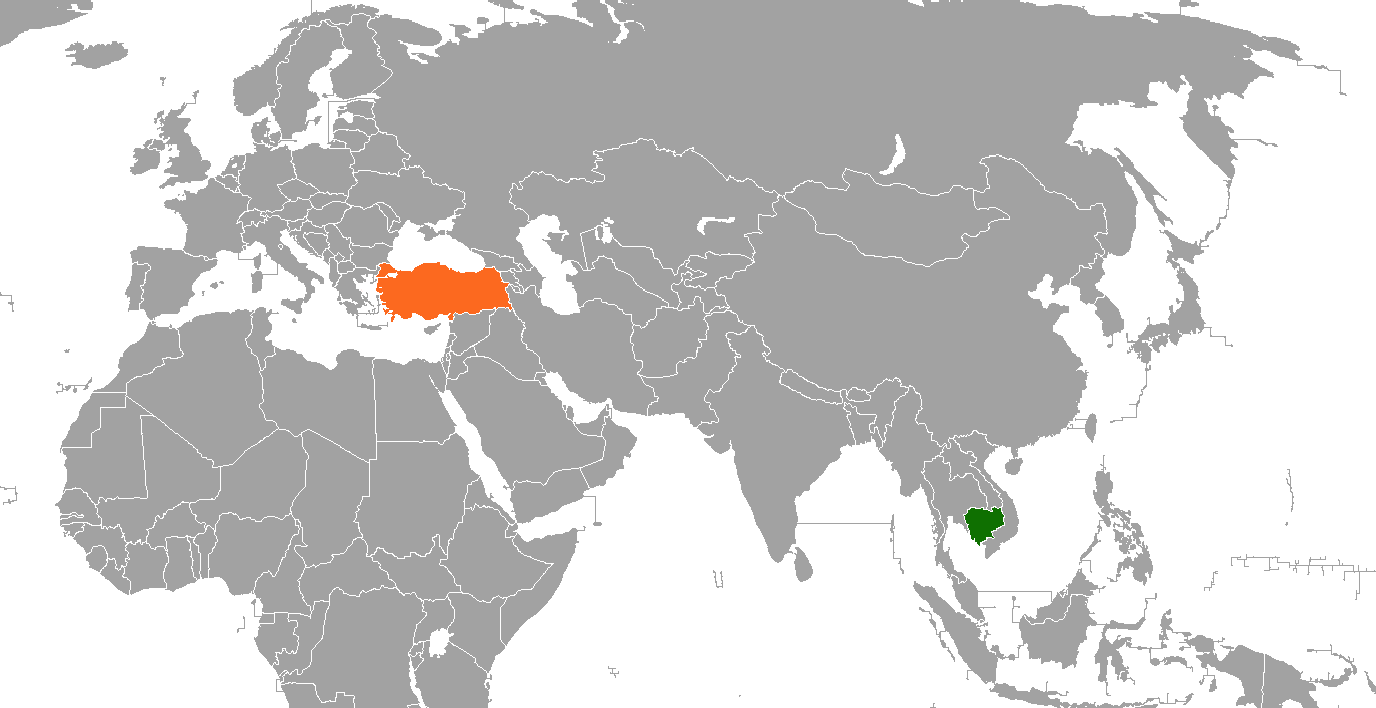
- Cambodia: Turkey

Cambodia–Turkey relations are the bilateral relations between Cambodia and Turkey. Diplomatic relations at the legation level were established in 1947 and then to the rank of ambassador in 1959. It was not until 2013, however, that Turkey established a resident embassy in Cambodia's capital, Phnom Penh.

== Diplomatic relations ==
The two countries did not have diplomatic relations at the ambassadorial level until 2013. Part of the reason was the close relations that King Sihanouk developed with North Korea. Turkey, as a close ally to South Korea, refrained from fostering relations with the King who maintained his private residence in Pyongyang that was built for him by the president of North Korea, Kim Il Sung, in the 1970s. Relations improved after the dissolution of the Soviet Union, when Cambodia started engaging with noncommunist states.

== Presidential visits ==
Guest	Host	Place of visit	Date of visit
(Turkey) Minister of Foreign Affairs Mevlüt Çavuşoğlu	(Cambodia) Minister of Foreign Affairs Hor Namhong	Palais de la Paix, Phnom Penh	March 3, 2015
(Cambodia) Minister of Foreign Affairs Prak Sokhonn	(Turkey) Minister of Foreign Affairs Mevlüt Çavuşoğlu	Presidential Complex, Ankara	October 1–3, 2018
(Cambodia) Prime Minister Hun Sen	(Turkey) President Recep Tayyip Erdoğan	Presidential Complex, Ankara	October 20–22, 2018

== Economic relations ==
Trade volume between the two countries was US$108.4 million in 2015 (Turkish exports/imports: 3.7/94.7 million USD).

and Cambodia and Turkey agreed to enhance bilateral trade to a goal of US$1.0 billion at the 4th Joint Economic Commission Meeting in Ankara.

== See also ==
- Foreign relations of Cambodia
- Foreign relations of Turkey
- List of ambassadors of Turkey to Cambodia
