= Brunei–Cambodia relations =

- Brunei: Cambodia

Envoy
- Ambassador Pengiran Kasmirhan: Ambassador Lim Hokseng

Brunei and Cambodia established diplomatic relations in 1992. Brunei has an embassy in Phnom Penh, and Cambodia has an embassy in Bandar Seri Begawan. Both countries co-operate in trade, education and defence. Both countries are members of ASEAN.

== History ==
Relations between the two countries has been established since 9 June 1992. In 2012, His Majesty The Sultan of Brunei attended the 21st ASEAN Summit which been held in Phnom Penh while Prime Minister Hun Sen attended the Royal Wedding of the daughter of Bolkiah, HRH Princess Hajah Hafizah Sururul Bolkiah in the same year. A declaration was made at the conclusion of Sultan of Brunei's one-day official visit to Prime Minister Hun Sen and King Norodom Sihamoni's Cambodia as the two nations celebrated this year's 30th anniversary of the start of diplomatic ties, with both countries on 14 November 2022 vowed to reinforce their bilateral relations and cooperation for mutual benefits, according to a joint statement.

== Economic relations ==
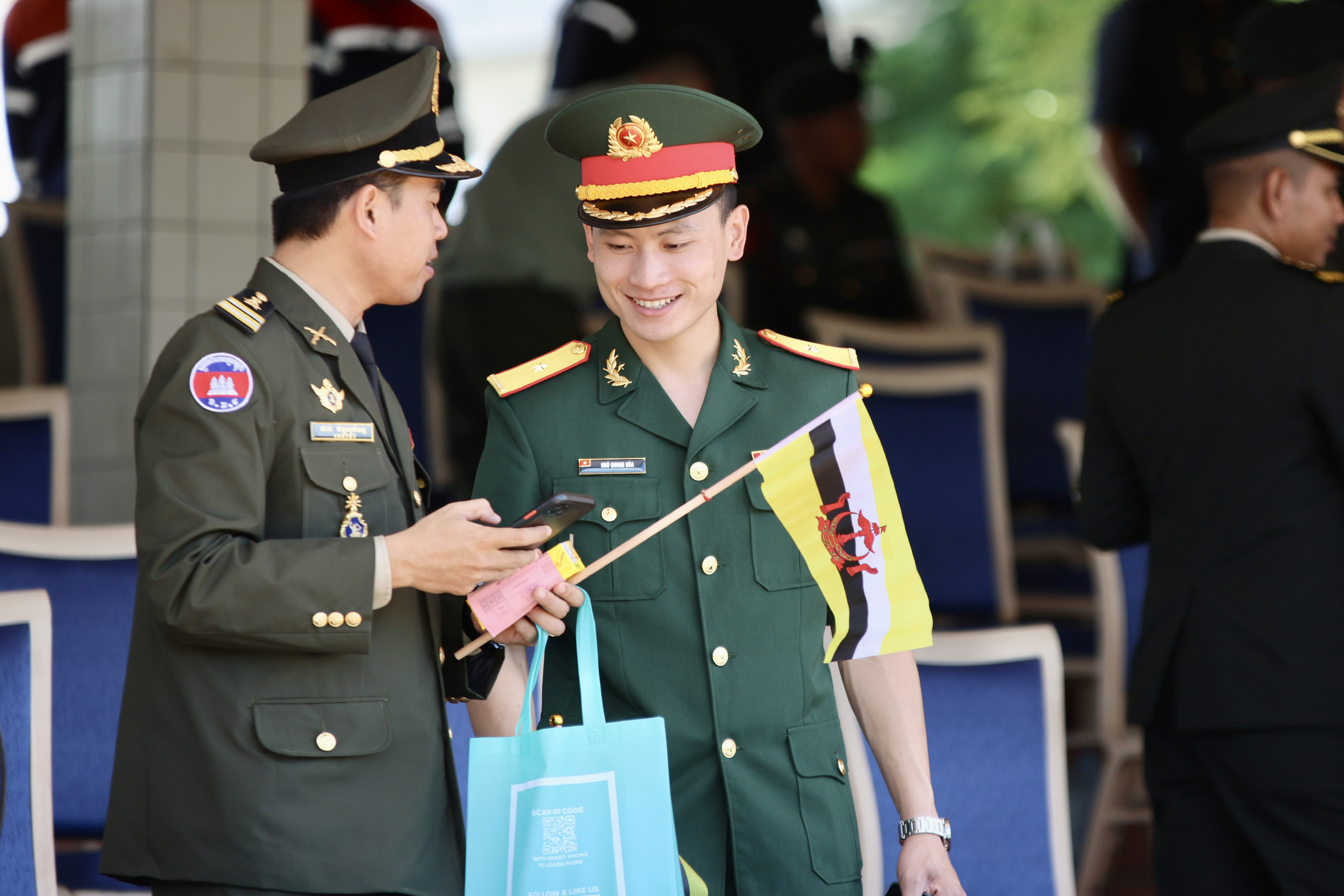
A Cambodian and Vietnamese military attaché in Brunei

Currently, both countries have a good diplomatic relations and the President of the Cambodia's National Assembly Heng Samrin has urged Brunei to look into Cambodia's potential for trade and investment co-operation. In tourism, approximately 560 Bruneians has visited Cambodia in 2012. Brunei also support the development of Cambodia. Both countries has signed an agreement on the rice imported in which Cambodian would export a high quality rice to Brunei. Many Bruneians tourists and investors has interested to travel and doing business in Cambodia due to the peace and political stability on Cambodia in the present.

Brunei will continue to import Cambodian rice and will provide a direct aviation connection to and from Cambodia. On 24 July 2014, Deputy Prime Minister Sok An greeted Pengiran Kasmirhan, the recently appointed ambassador. In response to Brunei's request for an increase in rice imports from Cambodia, Sok An said he would ask the Federation of Cambodian Rice Exporters' leaders to look into the situation. The meeting was in response to requests for direct flights and more rice imports from Cambodia.

On 11 August 2021, the first Memorandum of Understanding (MoU) to further collaboration for mutual benefit and improve cultural ties between Cambodia and Brunei was signed virtually between Phoeurng Sackona and Dato Aminuddin Ihsan, to advance cultural exchanges between the two countries and develop cultural ties. Additionally, it seeks to advance intercultural collaboration founded on the values of equity and reciprocity.

Both countries have decided to investigate the potential of establishing an arrangement wherein Cambodia sells agricultural products to Brunei and Brunei providing Cambodia with high-quality reasonably priced fertilizers on 29 December, Minister Dith Tina and Ambassador Pengiran Kasmirhan met and went through the general concept of the proposal.

== Security relations ==
There is also a co-operation between the Royal Brunei Navy and Royal Cambodian Navy in security with both countries exchange views on the current development in the bilateral defence relations. Brunei also assisting Cambodia in the English Language Courses which offered by the Brunei Darussalam's Ministry of Defence to the Royal Cambodian Armed Forces and Cambodia has participated on the Brunei International Shooting Skills Arms Meet (BISAM) and the ASEAN Armies Rifles' Meeting (AARM).

The trip, which served as Hun Manet's first to Brunei, occurred from 23 to 26 July 23 to July 2019. Even though this was planned ahead of time and was consistent with a number of visits Hun Manet has been making to other neighboring capitals, it happened at a busy time for regional security due to worries about a Chinese military facility in Cambodia and the Vietnam-China standoff in the South China Sea. In addition to these discussions, he also had a number of additional engagements during his stay that were connected to military.

== See also ==
- Foreign relations of Brunei
- Foreign relations of Cambodia
