= Cambodia–Laos relations =

- Cambodia: Laos

Cambodia–Laos relations are foreign relations between Cambodia and Laos established in 1956. Cambodia has an embassy in Vientiane and Laos has an embassy in Phnom Penh. Both countries are full members of the ASEAN. Cambodia and Laos have similar ruling parties: Laos has the Marxist-Leninist ideology of Lao People's Revolutionary Party while Cambodia has the Khmer nationalism of the Cambodian People's Party, which combines some elements of communism with monarchism and nationalism as part of its political system.

There are "shades of irredentism" along the border; as a result the Cambodia–Laos border was not fully demarcated as of 2019.

In April 2024, Laotian President Thongloun Sisoulith gifted two elephants to King Norodom Sihamoni during a state visit to Cambodia. The elephants, Champa and Rumduol, are named after the national flowers of the two countries.

== History ==
During the Vietnam War (1965–1975), the Ho Chi Minh trail passed through the territories of Cambodia and Laos. This network of land and water transport routes, stretching over 20,000 kilometers, was used by the Democratic Republic of Vietnam to transfer military supplies and troops to South Vietnam. The trail became one of the key factors contributing to North Vietnam's military victory. Today, Cambodia and Laos maintain strong and friendly relations, with regular meetings held between the top leaders of both countries.

== Economic relations ==
In 2013, the trade turnover between the two countries amounted to 10 million US dollars. Laos imports food products and consumer goods from Cambodia, while Cambodia imports electricity, industrial goods, timber, and agricultural products from Laos. By 2015, trade between the two nations had reached 24.5 million US dollars.

== Political relations ==
In November 2025, during The 15th Meeting of the Joint Commission for Bilateral Cooperation between Cambodia-Loas, both sides reaffirmed their commitment to their partnership for shared benefit. The Agreed Minutes of the JCBC were signed as an agreed summary of the meeting.

== See also ==
- Cambodia–Laos border
- Foreign relations of Cambodia
- Foreign relations of Laos

== Sources ==
- Baird, Ian G. (2010). "Different views of history: Shades of irredentism along the Laos–Cambodia border" (PDF). Journal of Southeast Asian Studies. 41 (2): 187–213. doi:10.1017/S0022463410000020. ISSN 0022-4634.
