= Cambodia–Malaysia relations =

- Cambodia: Malaysia

Cambodia–Malaysia relations are the bilateral relations between Cambodia and Malaysia. Both countries are members of ASEAN. Cambodia has an embassy in Kuala Lumpur, and Malaysia has an embassy in Phnom Penh.

== History ==
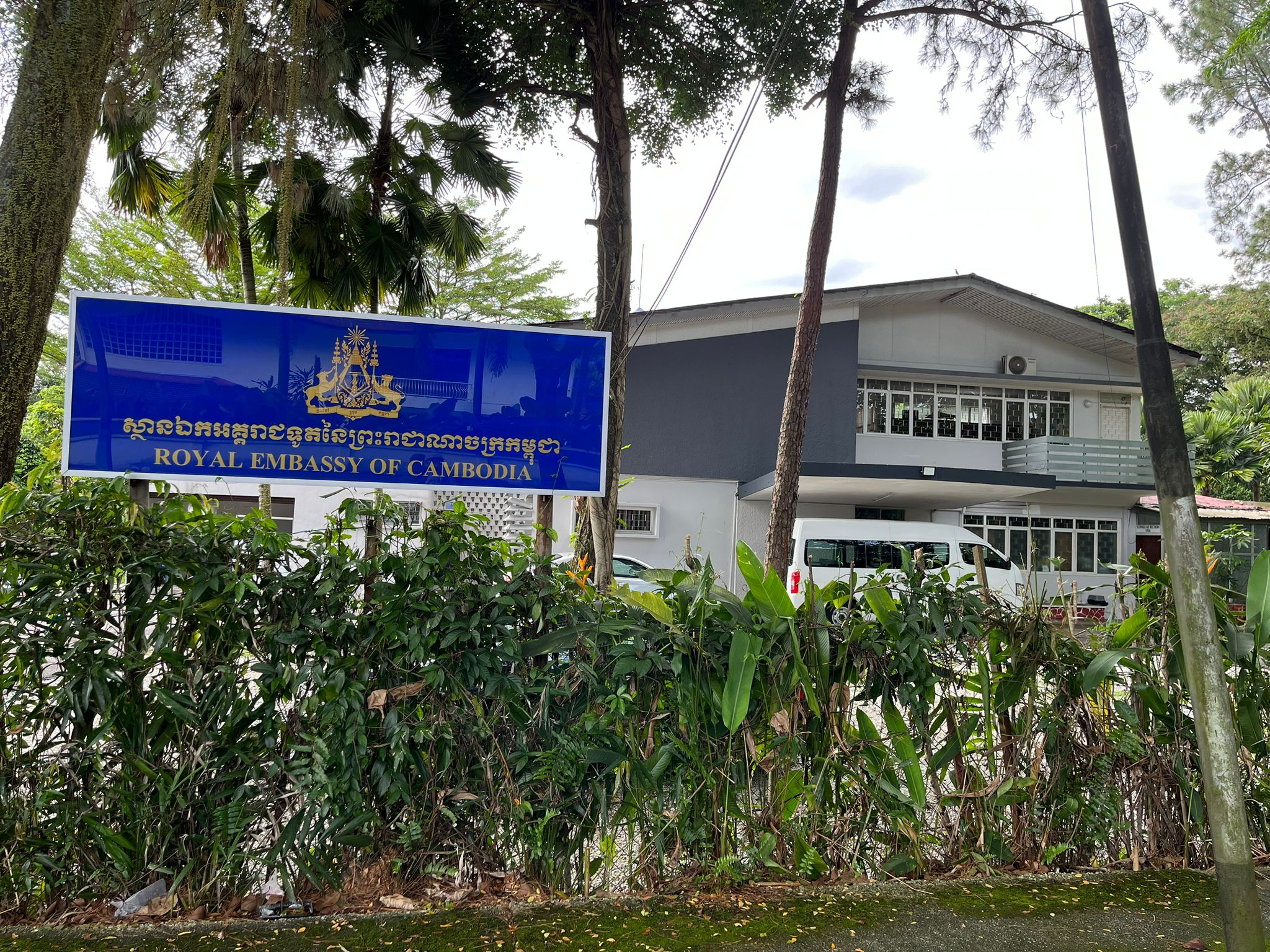
Embassy of Cambodia in Kuala Lumpur

Relations between Cambodia and Malaysia were established on 31 August 1957. From 1969 to 1975, the Malaysian embassy in Beijing was accredited to Cambodia. The Malaysian embassy in Phnom Penh was closed after the Khmer Rouge regime reached the capital and took power in 1975. At the same time, many Cham people from Kampong Cham and surrounding areas in central Cambodia fled the regime overland to camps in Thailand hoping to seek asylum in Malaysia due to sense of similar religious affiliations towards Malaysia as a Muslim-majority country as well as having distant family ties in places like Kelantan. After much political persuasion from Organisation of Islamic Conference, a recorded total of 9,704 Cham refugees were accepted into Malaysian borders by the end of 1988; these refugees have since been integrated as part of the "Malay" demographic (due to shared Austronesian lineages) while self-identifying as Melayu Kemboja ("Cambodian Malay") or later Melayu Champa ("Champa Malay").

The Malaysian embassy in Phnom Penh was re-opened on 26 November 1991 following the signing of the Paris Peace Accord on 23 October 1991 and establishment of the United Nations Transitional Authority in Cambodia. Since then, the relations grew after both countries decide to discover other potential of economic co-operation. The relations were also supported by Malaysian King Tuanku Syed Sirajuddin ibni Tuanku Syed Putra Jamalullail and Cambodian King Sihanouk.

== State visits ==
On 14 April 1994, Malaysian Prime Minister Mahathir Mohamad arrived in the Cambodian capital for a three-day official visit and invited Cambodia to consider becoming a member of ASEAN.

== Economic relations ==
A total of 64,534 Cambodians visited Malaysia in 2013, while Malaysian visitors to Cambodia numbered 54,000. In 2011, bilateral trade between the two countries was worth over US$319.5 million and in 2010 Malaysia was considered one of the biggest investors in the country with total investments of U$2.19 billion while Malaysian investments in Cambodia during the previous two years totalled U$118 million. In 2015, trade between the two countries amounted to $385.8 million, with Malaysia recorded $234.5 million in exports and $151.3 million in imports with Cambodia. In the same year, Malaysia became the fifth largest investor in Cambodia, with more than 150 Malaysian companies operating or having business interests. To increase the continuous business co-operation between companies in the two countries, a memorandum of understanding was signed. There is also a Malaysia Cambodia Business Council. In September 2019 during the visit of Malaysian Prime Minister Mahathir Mohamad, the two countries signed two agreements on tourism and double tax avoidance to boost trade, investment and co-operation in tourism.

== Issues and incidents ==
=== Cambodian domestic workers ill-treatment in Malaysia ===
Cambodia is known as another source of domestic workers for Malaysia after Indonesia decided to stop sending their maids in 2016 due to frequent reports of abuse, although they started to send their maids again in 2017. Cambodians were not exempt from similar treatment, and many of their maids were also treated badly by their Malaysian employers or immigration officers who had their documents held for years after being cheated by recruitment agents in the country. A report in 2016 stated that a Cambodian maid detained in one of Malaysian immigration centre saw three women of Cambodian and Vietnamese nationalities die there after being severely tortured, with other nationalities like Thai, Indonesian and Laotian prisoners badly tortured as well. Previously in 2012, one Cambodian maid died after being starved to death by her employer. Since 2011, Cambodia has banned its domestic workers from travelling to Malaysia. The issues led to protest and criticism from various human rights groups in Cambodia who demanded the Cambodian government stop sending domestic workers until Malaysia adhered strictly to human rights, although many Cambodians continued to explore job opportunities, mainly as domestic workers, in the hope of earning more money than they could at their home country. Following negotiation between the two countries government, Cambodia lifted the ban for its workers to going to Malaysia, with Malaysia also legalising any Cambodians maid working illegally in the country. In 2017, five Cambodian domestic workers were repatriated from Malaysia for working illegally. Responding to the frequent maid abuse cases in Malaysia, the Malaysian Human Resource Ministry has released a "Guidelines and Tips for Employers of Foreign Domestic Helpers" to promote more cordial relationships and understanding between employers and their maids while minimising unpleasant incidents. On 29 November 2017, the Cambodian government signed a Memorandum of Agreement to appoint the Malaysian Association of Foreign Maid Agencies (PAPA) as its representative to monitor the safety and welfare of its citizens returning to work as domestic workers in Malaysia. Each workers will be given a smartphone with security application by Malaysian Private Employment Agency and guidelines for hiring maids will also be provided to ensure that their welfare and safety are assured throughout the time. While for employers, the period for their workers to work are limited for at least two years and if any problems occurred, the employer can contact the employment agency that provides the maid.

=== Detention of Malaysian nationals in Cambodia ===
Since 11 December 2018, around 47 Malaysian nationals have been detained by Cambodian authorities after they been suspected of being involved in illegal gamblings activities in the country, where the news are only arrived to Malaysia and confirmed by the Malaysian Foreign Ministry on 7 February 2019. According to one of the detainees, they were promised $1,500 monthly to work in Cambodia by Chinese nationals but was instead treated like bonded slaves in Poipet, Banteay Meanchey Province after being picked up in Siem Reap following their arrivals in Cambodia between 18 and 19 September 2018. Following his arrestment together with the other victims, he said that he is uncertain whether the Chinese nationals who cheated them are also being detained as they are nowhere to be seen in the detention centre. With the negotiation between the Cambodian and Malaysian governments, Cambodian Prime Minister Hun Sen and Deputy Prime Minister Prak Sokhonn finally approved for their release on 15 February 2019 after finding most of the victims have been duped by a job agency syndicate.

== See also ==
- Foreign relations of Cambodia
- Foreign relations of Malaysia
- Chams
