= Cambodia–Singapore relations =

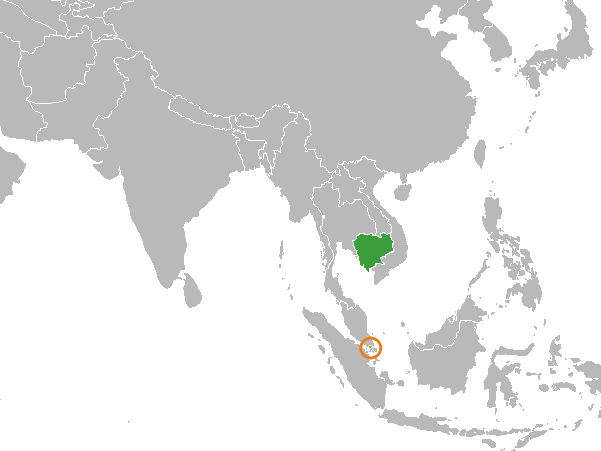
- Cambodia: Singapore

Envoy
- Ambassador Sok Khoeun: Ambassador Steven Pang Chee Wee

Bilateral relations between Cambodia and Singapore were established on 10 August 1965. Cambodia achieved independence from France on 9 November 1953 by Sihanouk as king and the head of state, once it became part of French Indochina. The two countries' relations continue to strengthen; Cambodia has an embassy in Singapore and vice versa. Singapore gained independence from Britain on 31 August 1963. Cambodia was one of the first countries to recognize Singapore's sovereignty when it was expelled from Malaysia on 9 August 1965. Both countries are members of ASEAN.

Singapore's diplomatic (recognition of the Coalition Government of Democratic Kampuchea) and military support for the armed factions - including the Khmer Rouge led by Khieu Samphan - that had opposed the pro-Vietnamese government in 1980s, after the Vietnamese forces had toppled the Maoist leader Pol Pot (Saloth Sâr) which forced him and the Khmer Rouge cadres of Democratic Kampuchea to retreat back into the jungle near the border of Thailand which has located in Anlong Veng from 1979 until 1997, has occasionally raised tensions nowadays, too.

== See also ==
- Foreign relations of Cambodia
- Foreign relations of Singapore
