= Cambodia–South Korea relations =

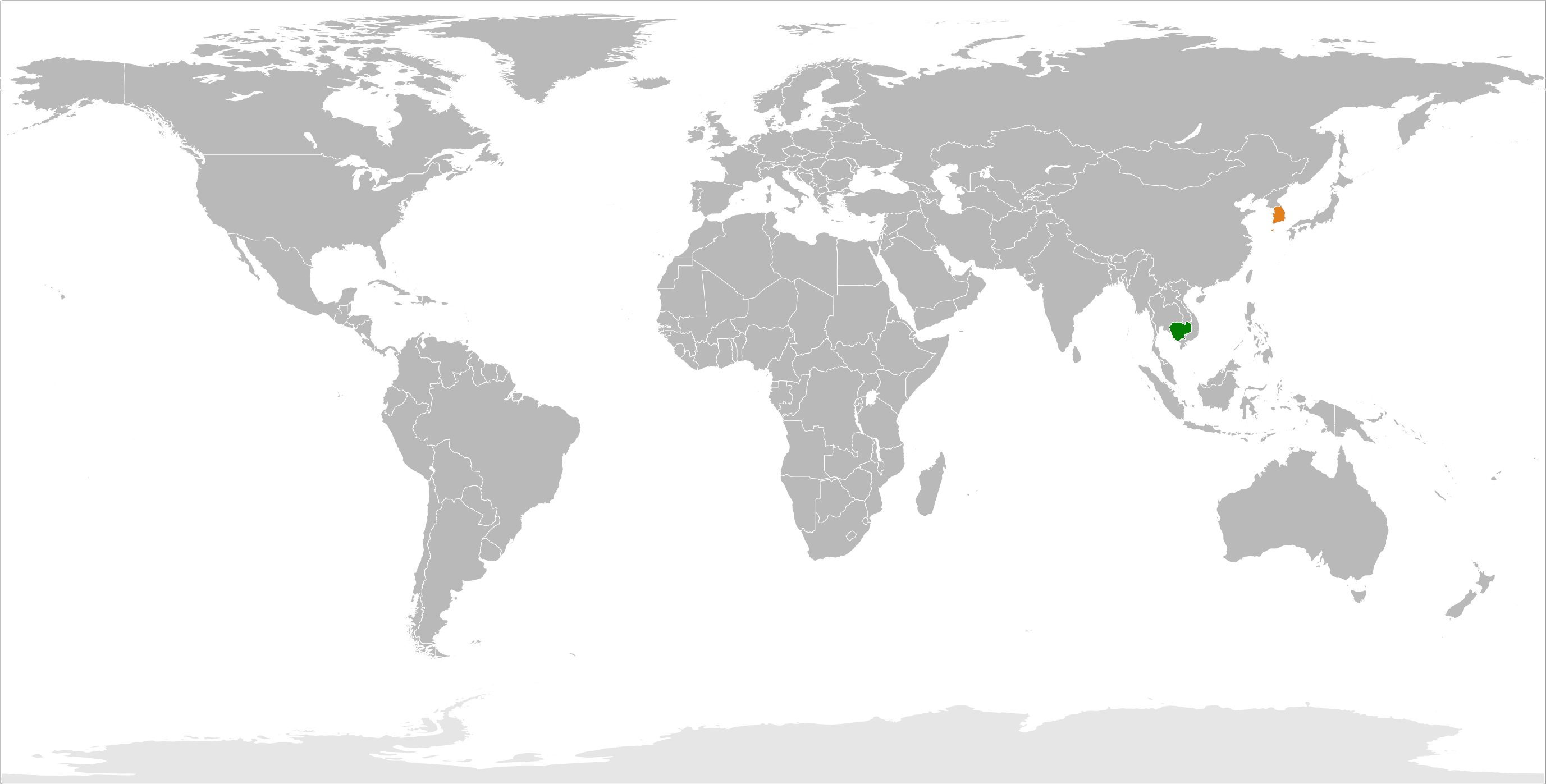
- Cambodia: South Korea

Diplomatic mission
- Embassy of the Cambodia, Seoul: Embassy of South Korea, Phnom Penh

Envoy
- Ambassador Vacant: Ambassador Khuon Phon Rattanak

Cambodia–South Korea relations are foreign relations between Cambodia and South Korea. South Korea has an embassy in Phnom Penh and Cambodia has an embassy in Seoul.

== Free trade agreements ==
The two countries agreed to hold a joint FTA committee in the first half of 2024.

== Cooperation ==
South Korea has played an important role in promoting Cambodia's socioeconomic development, especially in helping the country develop major industries such as infrastructure, agriculture, healthcare, and education.

In Phnom Penh in March 2024, South Korea's Ministry of Trade, Industry and Energy and Cambodia's Ministry of Commerce discussed ways to strengthen bilateral cooperation in areas such as trade, infrastructure and carbon neutrality.

"Based on the young human resources, Cambodia is a nation with high growth potential, posting annual economic growth of 7 percent over the past 20 years......We hope that Cambodia emerges as the key economic partner in the ASEAN bloc through the bilateral FTA."

— Cheong In-kyo, Trade Minister of South Korea

In Cambodia's clothing and textiles sector, South Korean companies are investing heavily to build factories and create jobs for locals.

== Summits ==
South Korean President Yoon Suk Yeol and Cambodian Prime Minister Hun Manet agreed at bilateral talks to further increase bilateral trade, which hit a record $1.05 billion in 2022.

== Disputes ==
Cambodian government has officially requested South Korea to deport Buth Vichhai who has been living in South Korea since 2016, participating as a pro-democracy activist. He is an Influencer and a Rapper and makes various songs and videos on Hun Sen who has been ruling Cambodia under the system of Dictatorship. His actions and protests includes criticisms towards Hun Sen and Hun Manet.

On 10 October 2025, the Cambodian envoy, Khuon Phon Rattanak was summoned for the death of a South Korean man caused by Scam centers in Cambodia by the Korean minister of foreign affairs, Cho Hyun.

== See also ==
- Foreign relations of Cambodia
- Foreign relations of South Korea
  - Indo-Pacific Strategy of South Korea
