= List of ambassadors of Turkey to Cambodia =

The ambassador of Turkey to Cambodia is the official representative of the president and the government of the Republic of Turkey to the president and government of the Cambodia.

== List of ambassadors ==
Ambassador	Term start	Term end	Ref.
İlhan Kemal Tuğ	1 November 2013	1 February 2018	
Ayda Ünlü	1 February 2018	30 June 2022	
Ülkü Kocaefe	1 July 2022	Present	

== See also ==
- Cambodia–Turkey relations
