= Cambodia–Indonesia relations =

- Cambodia: Indonesia

Diplomatic mission
- Embassy of Cambodia, Jakarta: Embassy of Indonesia, Phnom Penh

Cambodia and Indonesia established diplomatic relations on 13 February 1959. Cambodia has an embassy in Jakarta, while Indonesia has an embassy in Phnom Penh. Since diplomatic relations were established, Indonesia has been a strong supporter of peace and stability in Cambodia. In 1992, Indonesia provided troops for the United Nations Transitional Authority in Cambodia, and supported Cambodian membership to ASEAN in 1999. Cambodia appreciated that Indonesia has consistently helped Cambodia, especially in capacity building. Both nations are members of Non-Aligned Movement and ASEAN.

== History ==
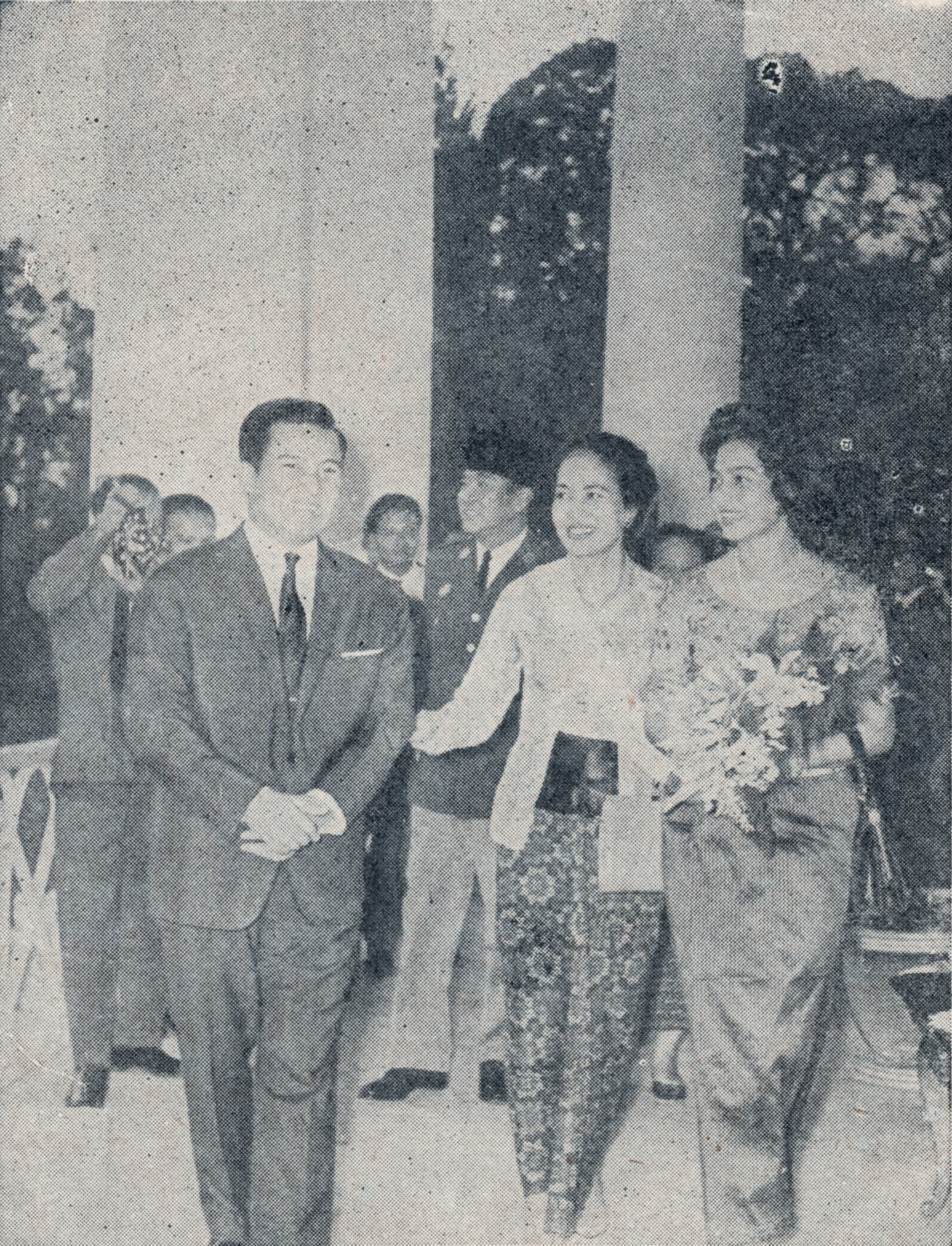
Royal Cambodian visit to Indonesia in 1964. Prince Sihanouk and Princess Monique are welcomed by Hartini Sukarno, on the background is Indonesian first president Sukarno.

The relationship between ancient Indonesia and Cambodia dated back from the kingdom of Chenla and Javan Sailendra and also Srivijaya; it was mentioned that king Jayavarman II had resided for some times in Java during the reign of Sailendras, and in 802 declare sovereignty of Cambodia from Java and proclaimed himself as universal monarch thus started the Angkor period. There are striking similarities between 9th century Bakong and Borobudur temple, which suggests that Borobudur was served as the prototype of Bakong. There must had been exchanges of travelers, if not missions, between the Khmer Kingdom and the Sailendras in Java, transmitting to Cambodia not only ideas, but also technical and architectural details. On 11 August 1863, Norodom signed a treaty with the French led by Ernest de Lagrée to establish a protectorate of Cambodia under French colonial rule led by Emperor Napoleon III which will later become part of French Indochina in 1887 from Paris by the French President Jules Grévy while King Willem III of the Netherlands ruled Indonesia as part of the Dutch East Indies with its capital Batavia, outside of Amsterdam. Following the Indonesian War of Independence against Dutch colonial rule which declared independence from the Netherlands on 17 August 1945 led by its founder Sukarno. On 9 November 1953, 8 years after Indonesia's independence from the Dutch, Sihanouk proclaimed Cambodia to become independence from France.

Cambodia attended Bandung Conference, also known as the Asia-Africa Conference, held in April 1955. The landmark conference led to the establishment of the Non-Aligned Movement. In 1956, Indonesia recognized Cambodia as a sovereign nation, and in following year, both nations establishes diplomatic relations in 1957. In 1960, Indonesia formalize the treaty of friendship with Kingdom of Cambodia through the law UU 8/1960.

During Sukarno administration in the 1960s, the president of Indonesia has visited Cambodia and vice versa prince Norodom Sihanouk also visited Indonesia. Suharto's Indonesian mass killings and East Timor genocide had compared to Pol Pot's Cambodian genocide are mass killers and ruthless dictators between the Khmer Rouge led by Angkar and New Order. In 1992, Indonesia is among countries that provided troops for United Nations Transitional Authority in Cambodia to assist Cambodia in security and peace effort. Indonesia also welcomed and supported Cambodia membership in ASEAN in 1999.

== Culture ==
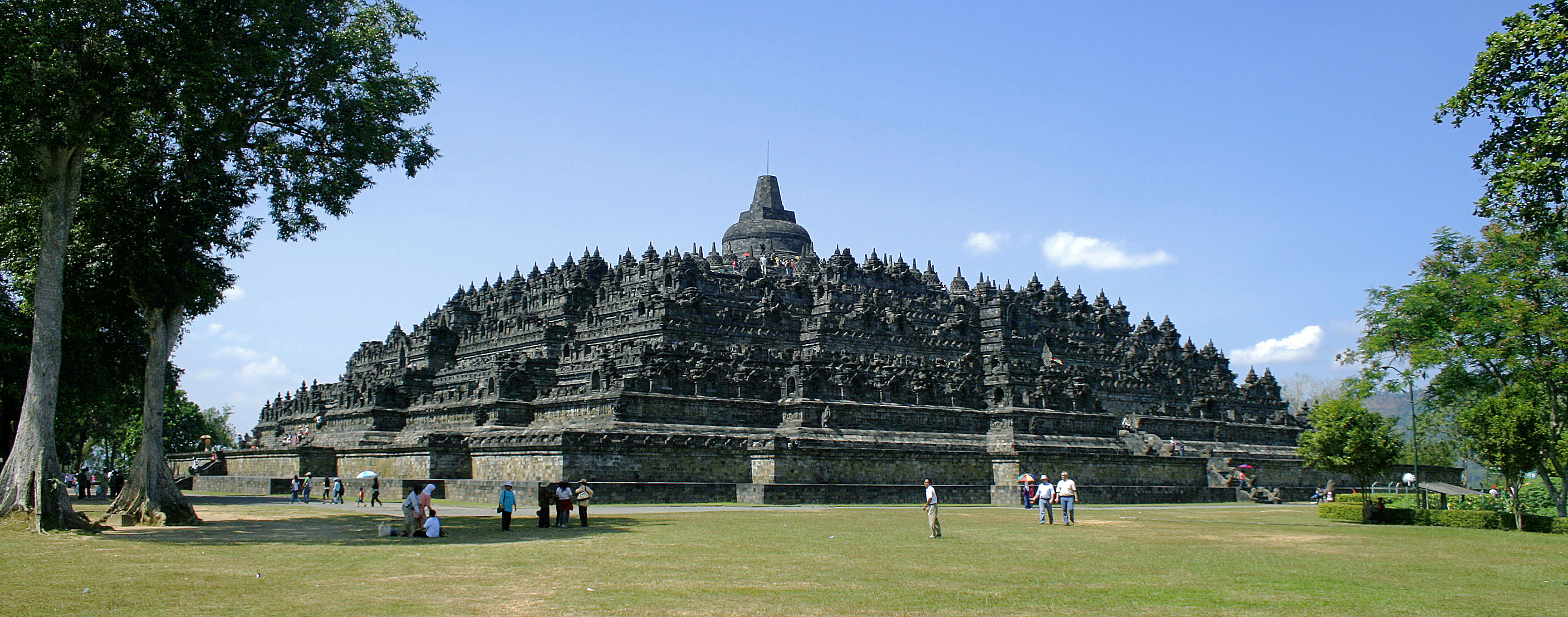
Borobudur temple, Central Java, one of architectural wonders of Indonesia, about 300 years older than Angkor Wat.

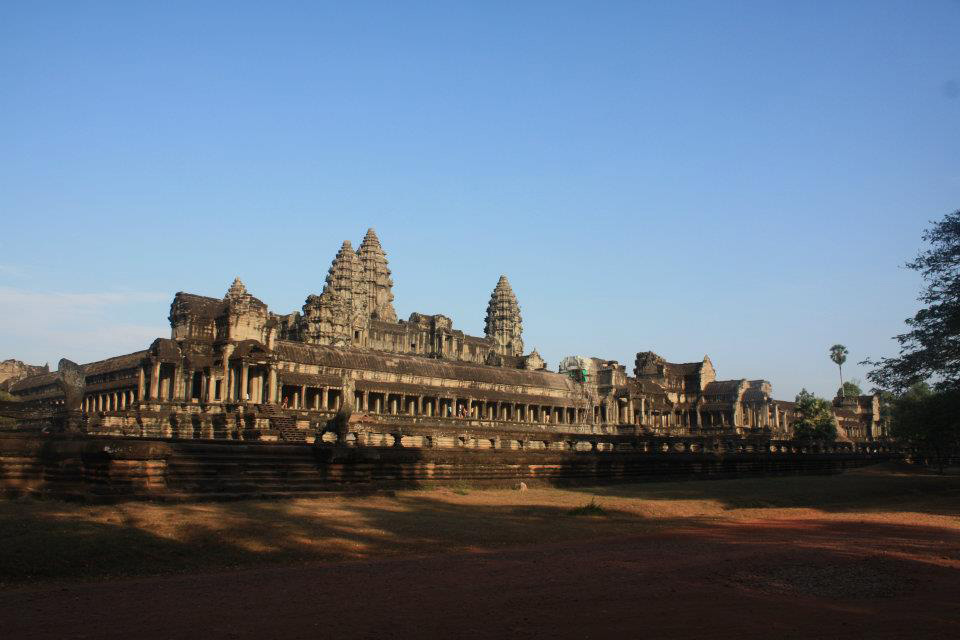
Angkor Wat, the architectural wonders of Cambodia, ancient Khmer empire and ancient Java have many cultural similarities.

Both nations have similar archaeological heritages that are held as UNESCO World Heritage Sites; the temple of Borobudur and Angkor Wat, both are proclaimed as sister sites in January 2012 during ASEAN Tourism Forum in Manado, North Sulawesi. The sister cities agreement between Siem Reap and Yogyakarta is also proposed during this event. Indonesia with its experience on Borobudur restoration projects, has lent its expertise on Angkor preservation efforts. Indonesia is among the countries that provide aid to Angkor restoration project, especially the three main gopura gates to the royal enclosure of Angkor Royal Palace, which originally was the Phimeanakas archaeological site.

== Economic relations ==
Indonesia and Cambodia signed a free visa agreement in June 2010. The agreement's signing hoped the facility would improve not only the two countries' relations but also individual relations between the two nations as well as interactions between the two countries' businessmen. The trade relation between Cambodia and Indonesia has shown a steady increase. According to the latest figures of Cambodia's Ministry of Commerce, the bilateral trade volume last year was 220 million U.S. dollars, 10 percent rise, compared to a year earlier.

As Indonesia seeks to boost trade and investment in Cambodia, the country in August 2012 signed a deal to import as much as 100,000 metric tons of rice annually from Cambodia.

== Security ==
Historically both nations shared close military relations. The Indonesian Kopassus trained and assisted the formation of Cambodian Para-Commando Battalion back in 1972, which fought the final phase of Cambodian Civil War of 1970-75.

Both Cambodia and Thailand trust Indonesia as a fair and impartial observer to solve intra-ASEAN disputes. Thailand and Cambodia agreed to allow Indonesian monitors to go to the border between the two countries to help prevent further military clashes and Indonesia was appointed as observer in the 2008–2013 Cambodian–Thai border crisis.

== See also ==
- Foreign relations of Cambodia
- Foreign relations of Indonesia
