= Cambodia–Ukraine relations =

- Cambodia: Ukraine

Diplomatic mission
- Embassy of Ukraine, Hanoi: None

Cambodia–Ukraine relations are foreign relations between Cambodia and Ukraine. Cambodia has a non-resident embassy in Hanoi, Vietnam, but Ukraine does not have a Cambodian embassy. In 2022, Cambodia condemned the Russian invasion of Ukraine and then PM Hun Sen held Telephone conversations with Volodymyr Zelenskyy as well providing assistance with clearing land mines.
