= Cambodia–Netherlands relations =

Diplomatic and civil relations between two countries

- Cambodia: Netherlands

Cambodia–Netherlands relations are the bilateral relations held between the Netherlands and Cambodia. Cambodia has an honorary consulate in Breda (accreditated to the embassy in Brussels), and the Netherlands has honorary consuls in Phnom Penh and Siem Reap (both accredited to the embassy in Bangkok).

== Early history ==
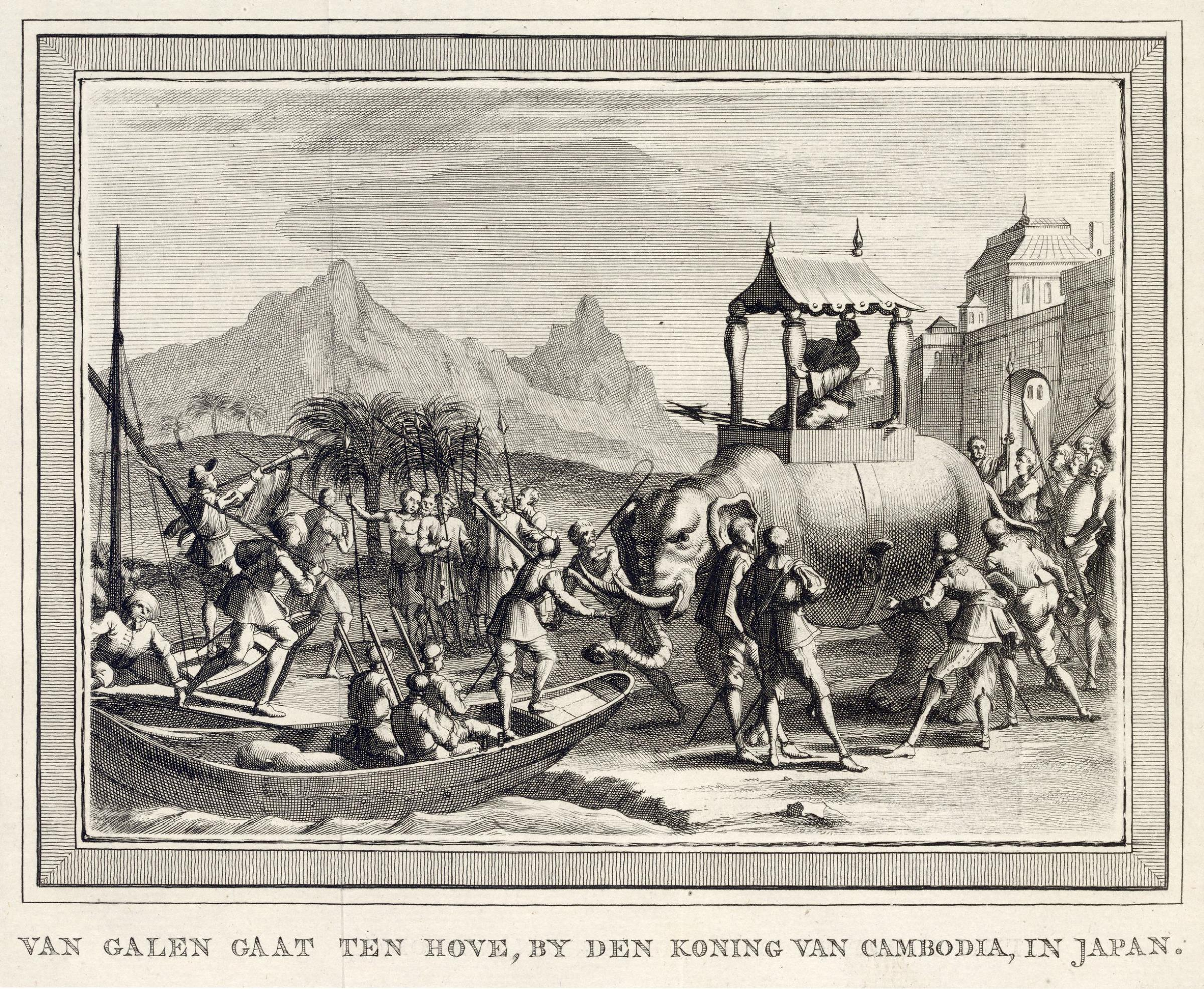
Van Galen visits the king of Cambodia.

By the mid 17th century, Cambodia had become a significant trading hub for Southeast Asian trade, incentivizing the Dutch East India Company to build commercial ventures in the country. Relations were positive, as the Netherlands promoted trade between Cambodia and Japan.

Relations began to sour as incidents between the Dutch and local people became frequent. Pieter Van Regemortes, a Dutch resident in Cambodia, refused to provide compensation after disrupting Cambodian trade with the Portuguese. The issues were not resolved even after the governor-general of Batavia, Henry Hagenaar, was sent to Cambodia.

In 1642, a prince usurped the Cambodian throne, converted to Sunni Islam and took the name Ibrahim. He then led a massacre killing 36 Dutch residents and commandeering a pair of ships. After the Battle of Phnom Penh in 1644, the forces sent by the Dutch for retribution were defeated, and the Cambodian Sultanate won the Cambodian–Dutch War. Peace was officially recognized on both sides of the conflict on 1656, July 8.

After the overthrow of Ibrahim, trade with the Dutch briefly resumed. By the 1670s, all remaining Dutch trading posts in Cambodia were abandoned.

== Modern era ==
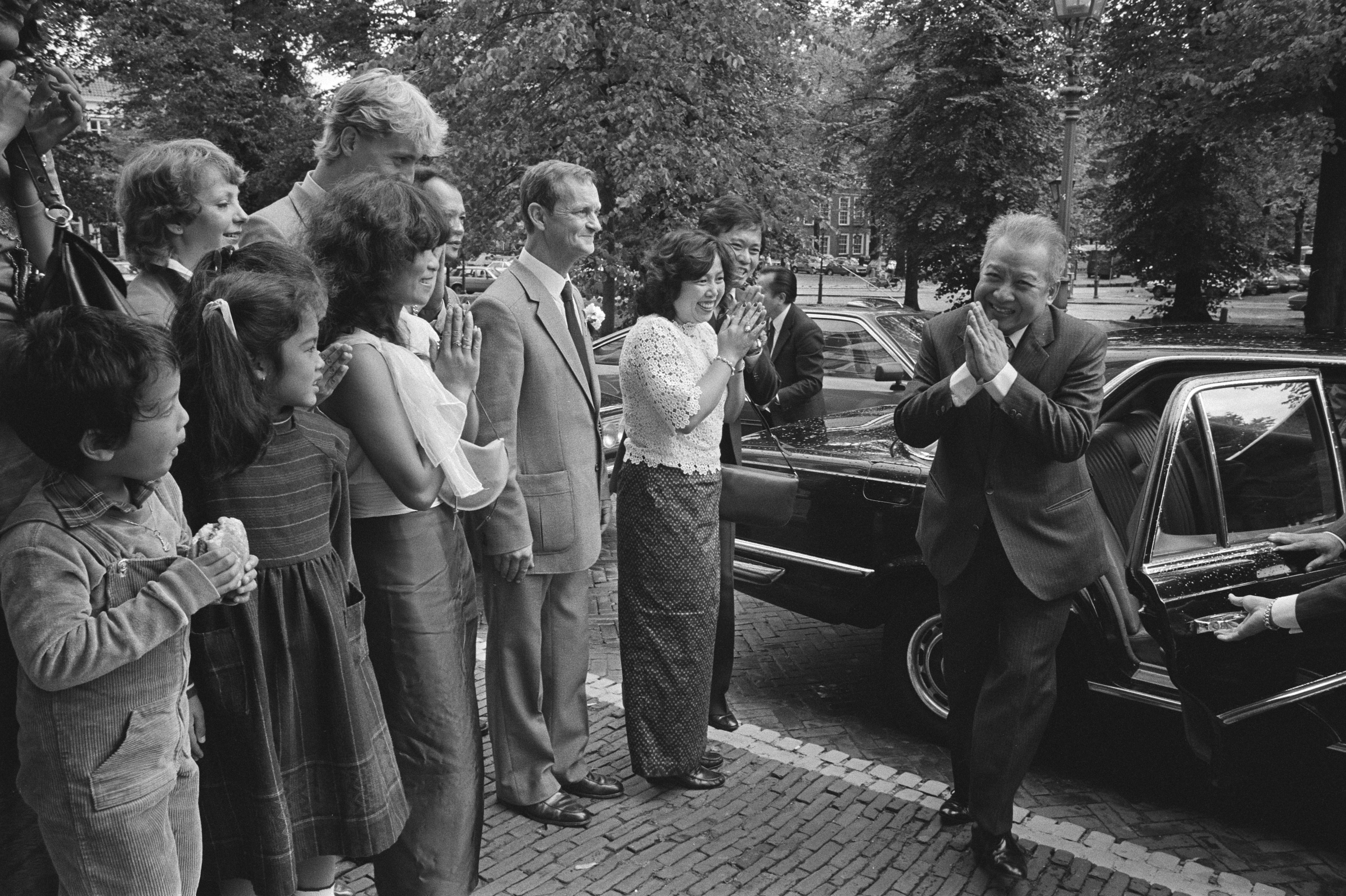
Then prince Norodom Sihanouk in the Netherlands in 1983

Relations did not get reestablished until Cambodian independence in 1953. Since the 11th of November, 1957, the Netherlands and Cambodia have held bilateral relations. The Netherlands supplied Cambodia with humanitarian services following the turmoil caused by the Cold War. A very small amount of refugees settled in the Netherlands following the Khmer Rouge.

In 2003, both countries signed a treaty on protection of investment properties. In 2024, both countries agreed to further political and economic cooperation, which was reaffirmed in 2026.

== Cultural promotion ==
In 2022, both a book and an exhibition, both on the topic of 1950-1960s Cambodian culture was partially sponsored by the Prince Claus Fund.
