= Cambodia–Israel relations =

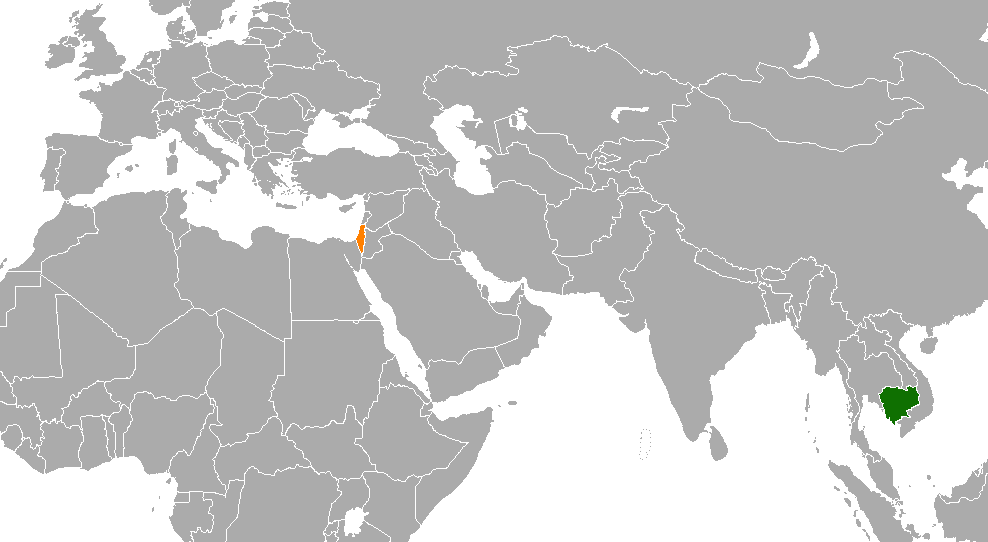
- Israel: Cambodia

Cambodia–Israel relations are the official relations between Cambodia and Israel. Both countries established diplomatic ties in 1960. In 1972, Cambodia opened its embassy in Israel in Jerusalem. However, Israel cut its ties with Cambodia in 1975 due to the rise of the Khmer Rouge regime. Ties were restored in 1993.

== History ==
Although Cambodia and Israel maintain diplomatic ties, Israel has no embassy in Cambodia and Cambodia has no embassy in Israel. The Israeli embassy in Bangkok, Thailand also handles matters related to Cambodia.

Large groups of Cambodian students come to study agriculture in Israel.

The Israel-Cambodia chamber of commerce was founded in 2010.

In December 2014, representatives of the Cambodian King planned a visit to Israel.

In 2016 three employees of Cambodian Mine Action Center (CMAC) visited Israel. In keeping with an agreement signed in 2017, the center sent 23 employees and 12 special trained dogs to Israel to help de-mine old mine fields, especially in the Arava desert.
