= Cambodia–Germany relations =

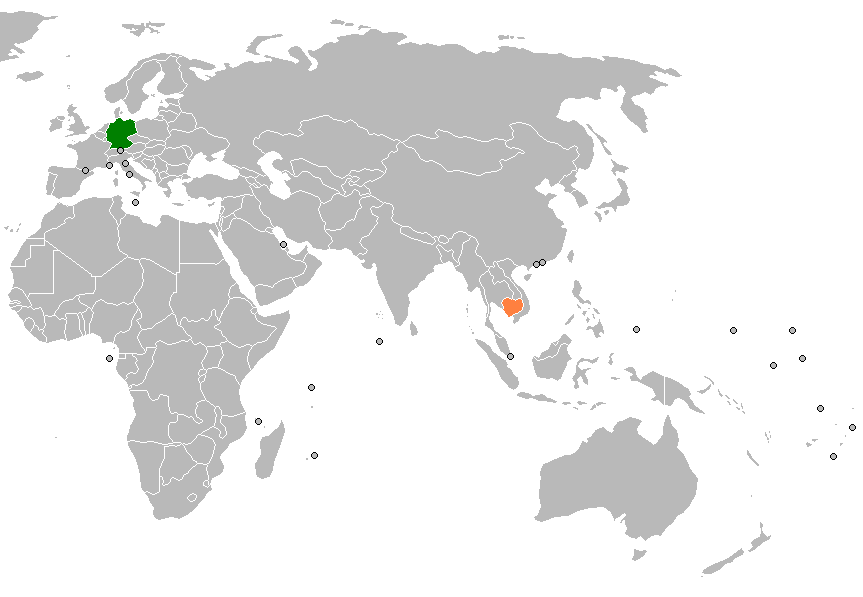

- Cambodia: Germany

Cambodia–Germany relations are diplomatic relations between Cambodia and Germany. Diplomatic relations between the Federal Republic of Germany and Cambodia were established on October 3, 1993. The GDR had already maintained diplomatic relations with Cambodia since 1962.

== History ==
The Kingdom of Cambodia was recognized as a state by the Federal Republic of Germany (FRG) in November 1956. However, full diplomatic relations were not initially established – the Federal Republic's representation in Phnom Penh was given the status of a consulate general – because the Cambodian government under Norodom Sihanouk pursued a policy of balance and neutrality between the power centers of the Cold War. As an expression of this policy, Cambodia also deepened contacts with both German states, with which initial economic cooperation agreements were signed by 1962. In the spring of 1962, the government in Phnom Penh also allowed the German Democratic Republic (GDR) to establish a consulate general. The following diplomatic upgrades were also granted to both German states. After the Consulate General of the Federal Republic was allowed to be transformed into a "Représentation" in 1964, the GDR was also able to upgrade the diplomatic-protocol status of its representation in July 1967. After Chancellor Kiesinger recognized the inviolability of Cambodia's borders on September 29, 1967, the FRG was able to convert its representation into an embassy on November 15, 1967, marking the official beginning of full diplomatic relations.

On May 8, 1969, the GDR was recognized by Cambodia under international law, and the establishment of diplomatic relations was announced. This also allowed the GDR to open an embassy in Phnom Penh. Cambodia was thus the first non-socialist country to fully recognize the GDR diplomatically. The establishment of full-fledged relations between Cambodia and the GDR was thus an important success in the latter's quest for international recognition, helping to pave the way for the 'recognition wave' of the following years. In the GDR, especially in the centrally controlled press, this recognition therefore received widespread attention and was interpreted as a triumph over its West German rival.

Since the recognition of the GDR went against the interests of the Federal Republic in avoiding diplomatic recognition of the GDR (Hallstein Doctrine), but it could not bring itself to break off relations completely, the German government decided on June 4, 1969, to recall the German ambassador in Phnom Penh, to cease the activities of the German embassy, and to limit economic and technical assistance to the settlement of contracts already concluded. Cambodia subsequently severed diplomatic relations with the Federal Republic on June 11, 1969.

=== Relations with West Germany ===
After diplomatic relations were broken off, France took over as the protecting power for the Federal Republic of Germany. Three German diplomats were still working in the French Embassy until March 15, 1975. After the Khmer Rouge seized power, the French Embassy was evacuated on April 17, 1975, and thus diplomatic contacts with Cambodia were completely broken off. During the rule of the Khmer Rouge (1975–1978) under Pol Pot and the occupation of Cambodia by Vietnam, there were no diplomatic relations between the Federal Republic of Germany and Cambodia until the signing of the Paris Peace Accords in 1991.

=== Relations with East Germany ===
However, from mid-1976 until May 14, 1977, an embassy of the Democratic Kampuchea (under the Khmer Rouge) existed in the GDR in East Berlin. The embassy of the People's Republic of Kampuchea existed in the same building in the East Berlin district of Pankow from the early 1980s until April 1989.

=== After German reunification ===
From July 19, 1991, to February 13, 1992, Germany's interests were represented by Hungary as a protecting power. From February 14, 1992, Germany maintained its own representation in Phnom Penh at the Supreme National Council.

After the first democratic elections and formation of a freely elected Cambodian government, full diplomatic relations were resumed on October 3, 1993, and the German representation at the Supreme National Council was transformed into a diplomatic mission. Germany assisted Cambodia with the clearing of mines and the Khmer Rouge Tribunal. After 2000, economic relations were intensified.

== Trade ==
Bilateral trade between Germany and Cambodia is characterized by a structural trade asymmetry heavily favoring Cambodia, which maintains a trade surplus of approximately $1.93 billion as of 2024. In 2024, total trade volume between the two nations reached $2.314 billion, driven primarily by Cambodian exports of garments, footwear, and consumer light manufactures to the German market.

In 2024, Cambodian exports to Germany totaled $2.12 billion, making Germany Cambodia's 4th largest export destination. The trade volume is heavily concentrated in textiles, apparel, and footwear, led by knit sweaters ($330 million), non-knit women's suits ($295 million), knit women's suits ($274 million), and rubber footwear ($110 million), alongside light industrial manufactures such as bicycles ($66.3 million). In contrast, German exports to Cambodia totaled $194 million in 2024, consisting mainly of capital goods, industrial input materials, and consumer products, led by motor cars ($35.8 million), malt ($23.9 million), and washing and bottling machinery ($16.8 million).

== Diplomatic missions ==
- Germany has an embassy in Phnom Penh.
- Cambodia has an embassy in Berlin.
