= Cambodia–Laos border =

International border

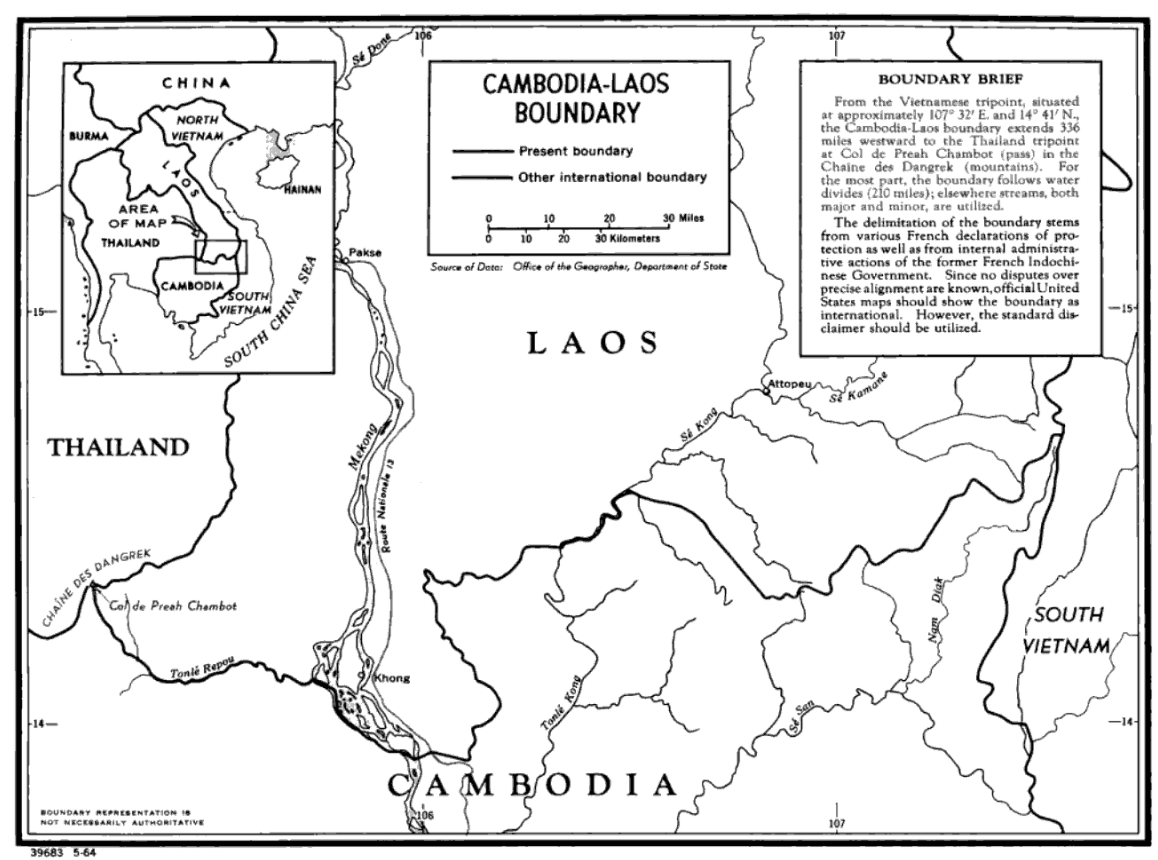
The Cambodia-Laos border

The Cambodia–Laos border is the international border between Cambodia and Laos. The border is 555 km (345 mi) in length and runs from the tripoint with Thailand in the west to the tripoint with Vietnam in the east.

== Description ==
The border starts in the west at the tripoint with Thailand at Preah Chambot peak in the Dângrêk Mountains. The border then proceeds overland to the south-east, reaching the Tonle Repou river and following this eastwards to the Mekong River. The Mekong here is extremely wide, forming the Si Phan Don islands area, with the border along the southern rim of this riverine lake, before leaving it and proceeding overland to the north. The border then turns east, reaching the Kong River and following this for a distance, before proceeding eastwards over to the Vietnamese tripoint in the Annamite Mountains.

== History ==
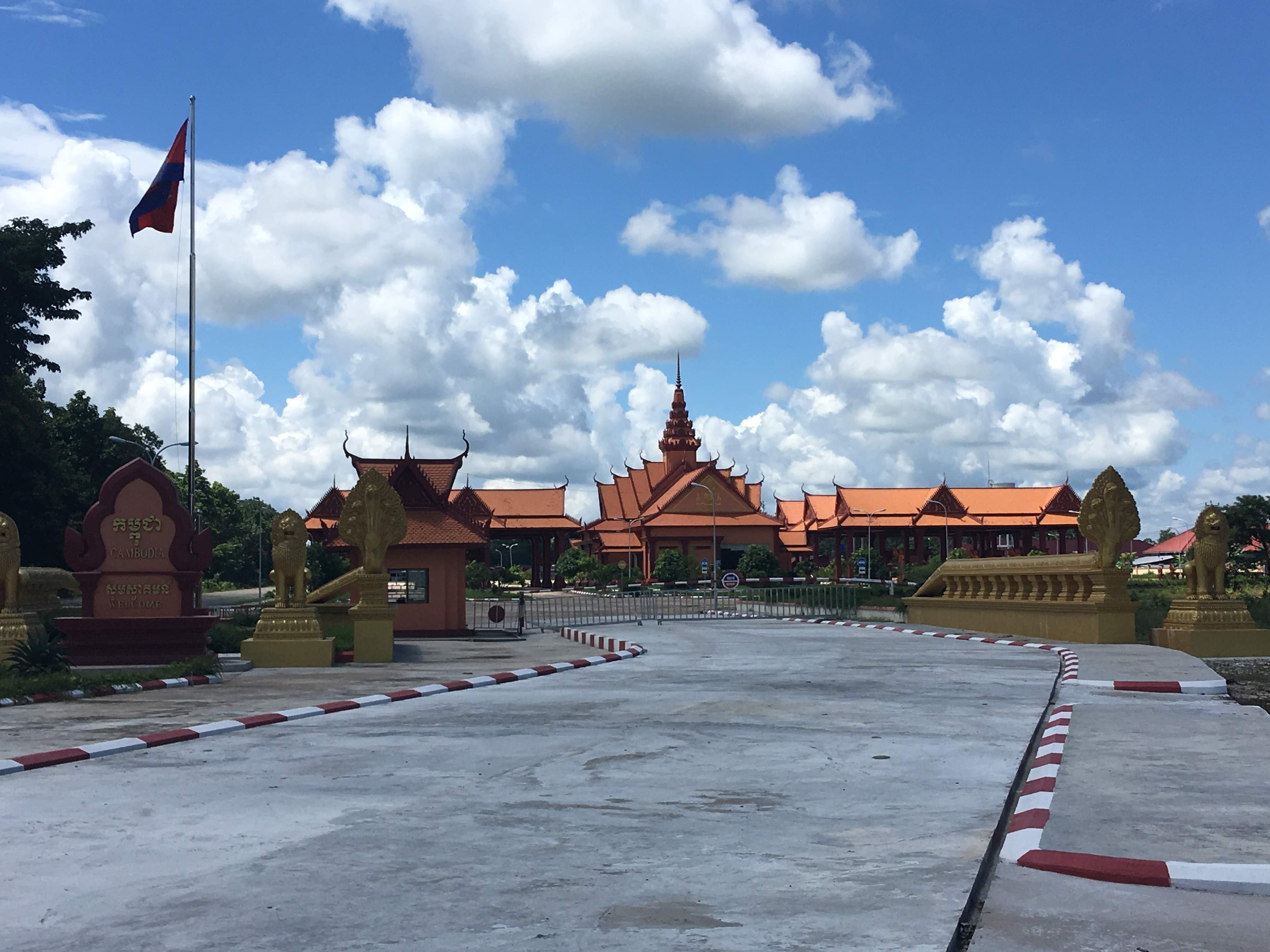
The border checkpoint at Nong Nok Khiene

From the 1860s France began establishing a presence in the region, initially in modern Cambodia and Vietnam, and the colony of French Indochina was created in 1887. Laos was at this point part of the Kingdom of Siam (the old name for Thailand), however all areas east of the Mekong were annexed to French Indochina in 1893 following the Franco-Siamese crisis. In 1905 the southern Lao regions of Stung Treng and Ratanakiri were transferred to Cambodia based on their historical affiliation to the Khmer kingdom, with a small area going to Vietnam. It is thought that the French authorities thereafter used the historic boundary of Stung Treng province as the Cambodia–Laos border, though as it was at this point merely an internal administrative line running through a remote area there was no pressing need to define it in detail.

Both Laos and Cambodia gained independence in 1954 and the border became one between two sovereign states. The border area was volatile throughout much of the 1950s-80s owing to the various conflicts in Indochina. There were also tensions over irredentist Lao claims to Stung Treng, with Cambodia conducting a Khmer-isation campaign in the region in the 1950s-60s. As a result no demarcation took place and Lao-Cambodian relations remained frosty, deteriorating further during the rule of the nationalist-Communist Khmer Rouge in Cambodia from 1975-79.

In 2000 the two countries announced that they would start work on demarcating the border. In 2017, Cambodian prime minister Hun Sen accused Laotian troops of violating the border. In August 2019, another dispute occurred around the Tonle Rapov river in Choam Khsant District, near the Cambodia–Laos–Thailand tripoint. On 13 February 2023, Cambodia and Laos signed a border demarcation treaty, and since then a joint border commission has continued work on installing border markers.

== Border crossings ==
There is currently one official crossing point, at Nong Nok Khiene (Laos) - Tropaeng Kreal (Cambodia). Corruption at the entrance for travelers entering Laos from Cambodia and Cambodia from Laos is common. For example, officers may request a $2 entrance fee and refuse to return the passport after the passport check.

== See also ==
- Cambodia–Laos relations
