= Cambodian–Dutch War =

1643–1644 War Between the Dutch and Cambodia

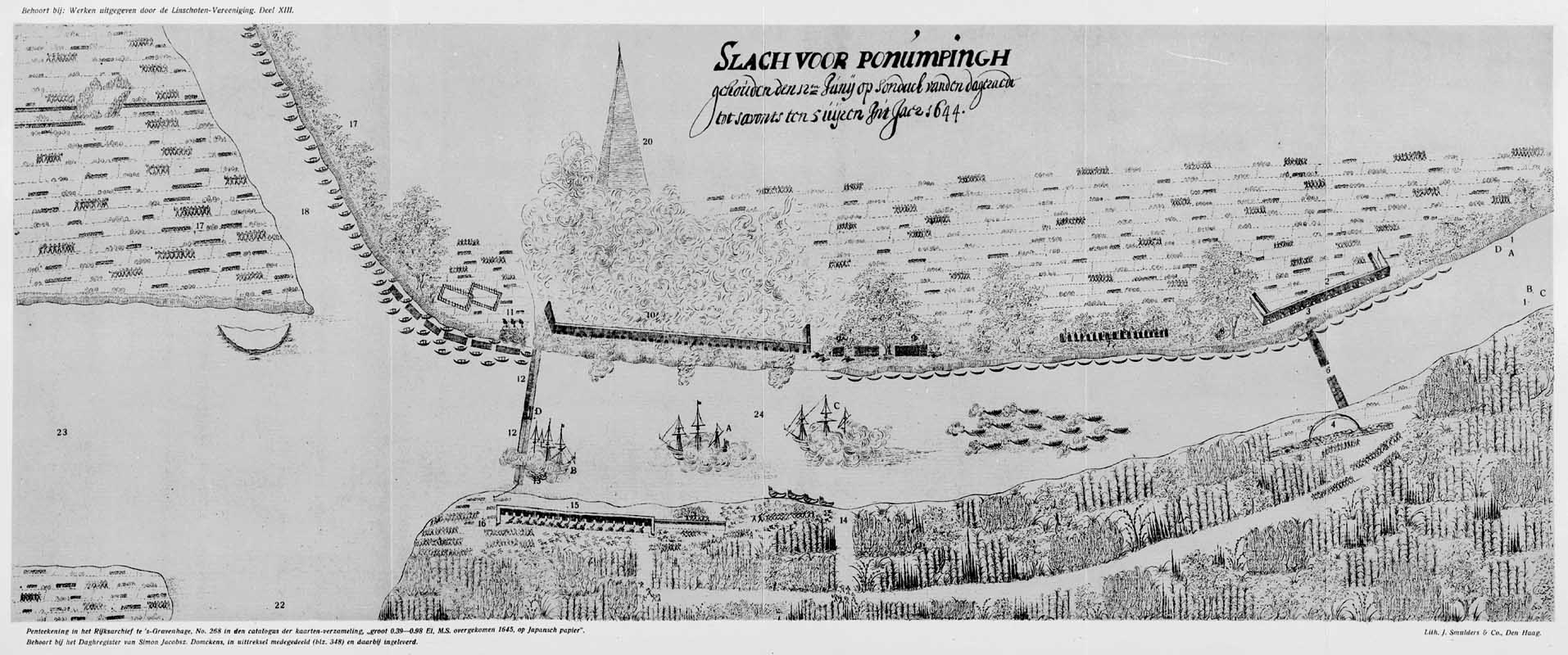
- Three VOC-ships fighting Cambodian troops on 12 June 1644 in Phnom Penh.
Date	c.1642–1644, 12 June
Location	Mekong River, Phnom Penh
Result	Khmer victory

Belligerents
Cambodian Sultanate	Dutch East India Company

Commanders and leaders
Ramathipadi I Barom Reachea V Ocknia Rawy	Antonio van Diemen; Cornelis van der Lijn; Pierre van Rogemortes †; Kapitein Hendricq Harouse †; Simon Jacobsz Dompkens

Casualties and losses
1644; 1,000 killed 5 ships sunk	1642; 36 employees massacred 2 ships captured 1643; 60 men POW (31 executed); 50 soldiers & officer personnel killed 1644; 156 soldiers killed many warships captured by the Cambodians

The Cambodian–Dutch War (Dutch: Cambodjaans-Nederlandse Oorlog; Khmer: សង្គ្រាមកម្ពុជា-ហូឡង់) from 1642–1644 was a conflict sparked by a coup which brought a new Cambodian king to the throne who converted to Islam with the help of Malay traders resident in the country. The sultan initiated a massacre of Dutch East India Company employees and subsequently defeated the Dutch forces sent to extract retribution from the Cambodians.

== Background ==
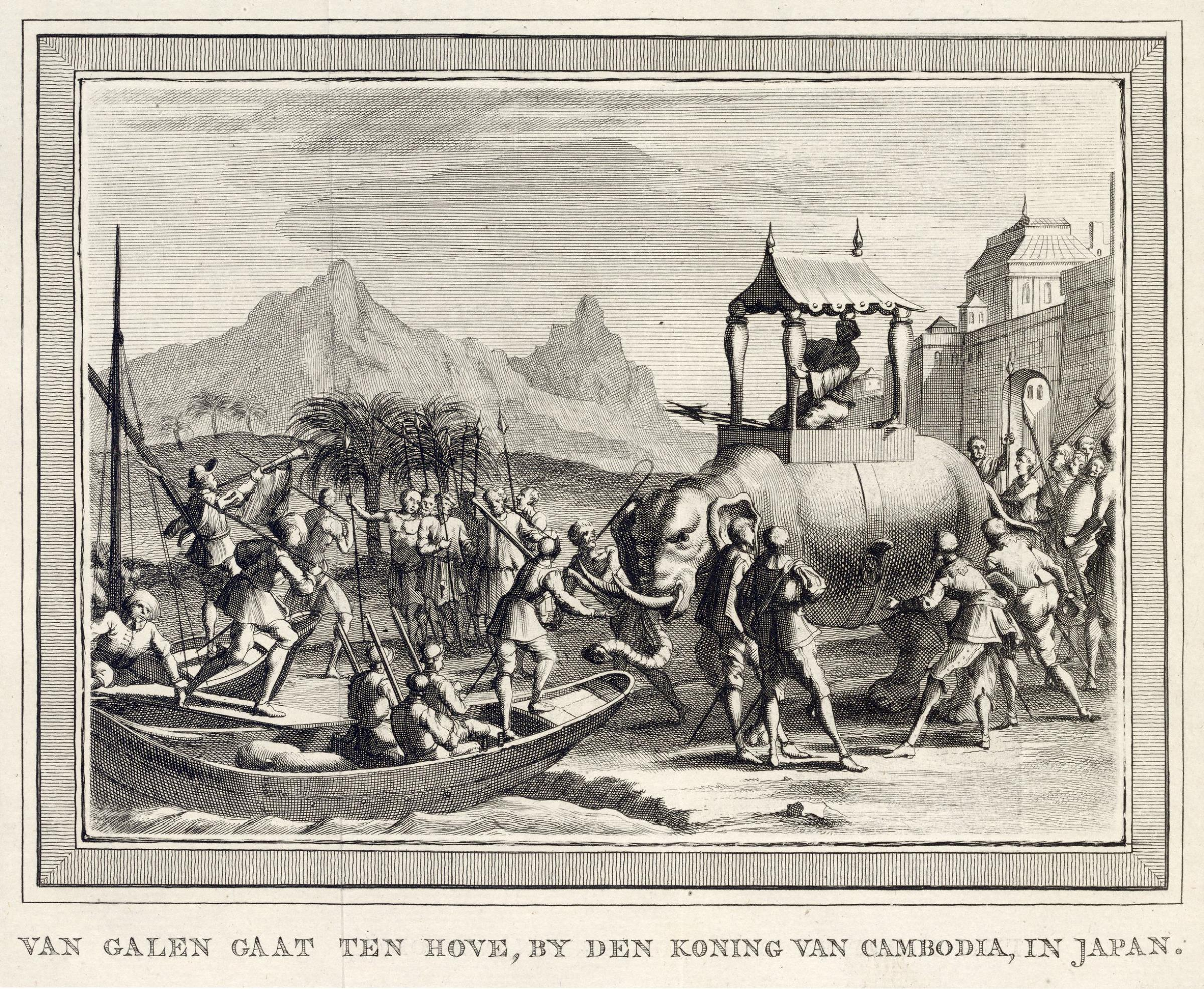
Van Galen visits the king of Cambodia.

In 1635, Cambodian ships brought products and silk to sell on the island of Java (Indonesia), but these goods were intercepted by the Dutch in the Sea of Makassar in the Sulawesi archipelago and detained for a year. The news of the detention reached the King of Cambodia, who enlisted regent Samdech Preah Uotey to request the release of the Cambodian ships from the Dutch. However the Dutch not reply. In 1636, a Dutch cargo ship named "Noordwijk" intending to sell copper to the Annam (Vietnamese) lost its way and came to the port of Peam in the Kampuchea Krom region of Cambodia. At that time, the Cambodian Customs Ministry intercepted and confiscated 30 cannons and 500 haps of copper (1 hap = 15 kg), equivalent to 7.5 tons. The seized the goods were not released to the Dutch. In 1637, the Dutch sent Henry Hagenaar, the governor-general of Batavia in the Dutch East Indies (present-day Jakarta, Indonesia), as a mediator to Cambodia to resolve the dispute over the detention of the Dutch ships. In May, Hagenaar arrived in Cambodia accompanied by four Dutch ships, and they came face to face with Portuguese ships, resulting in a conflict. Henry Hagenaar captured a Portuguese ship without any regard of Cambodian Law. When Hagenaar came to meet the King of Cambodia in the capital of Oudong to The Royal Letter of Credence Ceremony, he was severely reprimanded by the King for his arbitrary seizure of a Portuguese ship. As a result, relations between the Dutch and Cambodia soured.

== Conflict ==
=== Massacre of 1642 ===
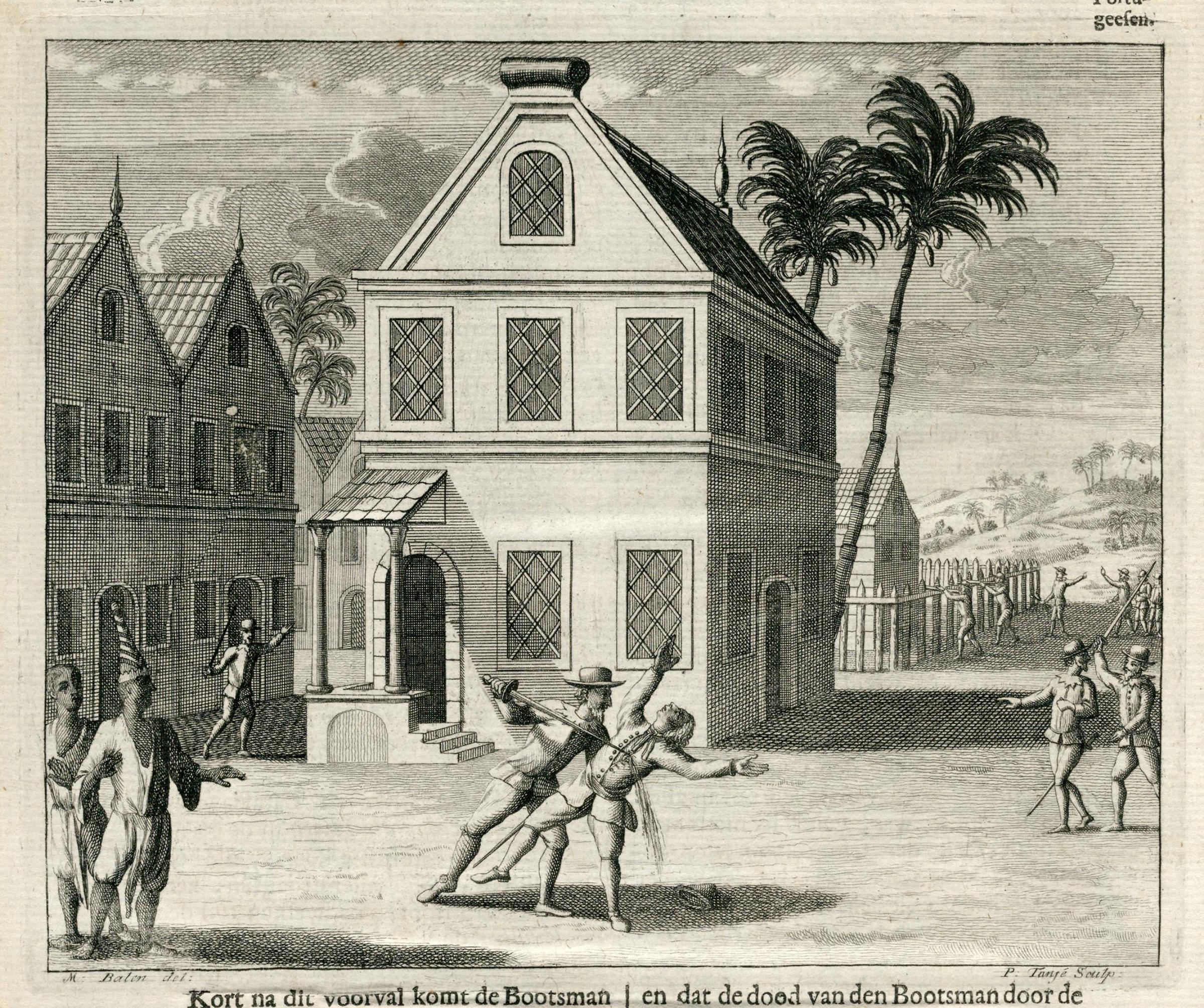
Dutch boatswain murdered by a Portuguese seaman in Cambodia.

In 1642 a Cambodian Prince named Ponhea Chan became King Reameathiptei I after overthrowing and assassinating the previous King. Malay Muslim merchants in Cambodia helped him in his takeover, and he subsequently converted from Buddhism to Islam, changing his name to Ibrahim, and he married a Malay woman. He then started a war to drive out the Dutch East India Company, by first starting a massacre in the trading post of the Dutch, commandeering two of their ships, and killing 36 Dutch employees of the Company in addition to the Company's ambassador, Pieter van Regemortes.

=== 1643 ambush ===
On November 27, 1643, Van Regemortes departed for an agreed meeting with the King. He took twelve soldiers with him for protection, as well as VOC personnel, including chief merchant Hermen Brouckman, junior merchant Buekoy, and various sons from wealthy Amsterdam families. Upon arriving in the capital, Oudong, he and his entourage were ambushed by hundreds of Cambodian soldiers and murdered on the spot with sabers. Later that day, all remaining employees of the VOC factory were attacked and slaughtered by Malays and Japanese. Next, they advanced towards the VOC ships anchored further away: the Rijswijck and the Oranjeboom. The captains and crew did not yet know what had just happened. The Cambodians pretended they wanted to inspect the boats, something that happened frequently. They were allowed on board but subsequently murdered part of the crew; another part managed to save themselves by jumping overboard and hiding on shore. When hunger got the better of them, they emerged from the woods and were taken prisoner. The king decreed that they be enslaved. The VOC lost about 50 soldiers and civilian personnel, in addition to the approximately 60 men who were now slaves.The third VOC ship had dropped anchor south of Phnom Penh, and the captain was likewise unaware of what had happened to the others when he was urged by Cambodians to come ashore. However, he found the situation suspicious.

Four Chinese who had climbed aboard to distribute rice wine and beer were taken prisoner, interrogated, and tortured as a precaution. They confessed to having come aboard on the king's orders and recounted what had happened to the others. The ship then departed for Batavia, taking the Chinese along, who were brought before the court on Java, tortured again, and sentenced to death.

=== Battle of Phnom Penh ===
in 1644, the Cambodians defeated the Dutch East India Company in a mostly naval war on the Mekong River, with the Cambodian suffering 1,000 dead, and the Dutch forces suffering 156 dead out of 432 soldiers. As a result multiple Dutch warships fell into Cambodian hands. Among the killed were Pierre de Rogemortes, the Dutch East India Company ambassador, and Captain Harouse, with a number of his men. It was not until two centuries later that European influence in Cambodia would recover from the defeat inflicted on the Dutch.

Back in Batavia, Van Diemen ordered a new and larger attack on Cambodia. For this, he wanted to enlist the help of the King of Siam. However, the Governor-General died in April 1645. His successor, Cornelis van der Lijn, considered a new expedition on such a large scale too costly and difficult, and he was also unsure of the outcome. He only proposed to free the VOC workers who had been enslaved. The King of Cambodia agreed. After about three years of slavery, all the survivors, 29 in total, were put on the VOC fluyt ship Oranjeboom, which had been seized by the Cambodians in 1643, and sent to Batavia. Peace was officially signed on July 8, 1656.

== Aftermath ==
King Reameathiptei was arrested and ousted by the Vietnamese Nguyễn lords after Ibrahim's brothers, who remained Buddhists, requested Vietnamese help to restore Buddhism to Cambodia by removing him from the throne. In the 1670s, the Dutch left all the trading posts they had maintained in Cambodia after the massacre in 1643.

== See also ==
- Cambodian–Spanish War
- Sino-Dutch conflicts
- Battle of Liaoluo Bay
- Trịnh–Nguyễn War
- Siege of Fort Zeelandia
- Cambodia–Netherlands relations

== Sources ==
- Chakrabartty, H. R. (1988). Vietnam, Kampuchea, Laos, Bound in Comradeship: A Panoramic Study of Indochina from Ancient to Modern Times, Volume 2. Patriot Publishers. ISBN 8170500486.
- Cormack, Don (2001). Killing Fields, Living Fields: An Unfinished Portrait of the Cambodian Church - The Church That Would Not Die. Contributor Peter Lewis (reprint ed.). Kregel Publications. ISBN 0825460026.
- Fielding, Leslie (2008). Before the Killing Fields: Witness to Cambodia and the Vietnam War (illustrated ed.). I.B.Tauris. ISBN 978-1845114930.
- Kiernan, Ben (2008). Blood and Soil: A World History of Genocide and Extermination from Sparta to Darfur. Melbourne Univ. Publishing. ISBN 978-0522854770.
- Kiernan, Ben (2002). The Pol Pot Regime: Race, Power, and Genocide in Cambodia Under the Khmer Rouge, 1975-79 (illustrated ed.). Yale University Press. ISBN 0300096496.
- Osborne, Milton (2008). Phnom Penh : A Cultural History: A Cultural History. Oxford University Press. ISBN 978-0199711734.
- Reid, Anthony (1999). Charting the shape of early modern Southeast Asia. Silkworm Books. ISBN 9747551063.
