= Cambodia–Pakistan relations =

- Pakistan: Cambodia

Cambodia–Pakistan relations refers to the foreign relations between the Islamic Republic of Pakistan and the Kingdom of Cambodia. Pakistan has an embassy in Phnom Penh, while Cambodia has its official Embassy in India accredited and an honorary consulate in Lahore.

== Joint initiatives ==
One of the first signs of strengthening relations came in April 2004, when Pakistan and Cambodia agreed to promote and develop multi-lateral relations for stability, peace and security in South Asia, Southeast Asia and in the broader sense to the whole of Asia Pacific region.

There have been pledges made by the Pakistani government of training numerous Cambodian students for getting training in various Civil Aviation and defence forces institutions in Pakistan.

In July 2025, Cambodia called upon Pakistan, the then President of the United Nations Security Council, to convene an emergency meeting regarding the 2025 Cambodia-Thailand border conflict which had escalated significantly.
