= Royal Embassy of Cambodia, London =

Diplomatic mission of Cambodia in the United Kingdom

Royal Embassy of Cambodia, London ស្ថានទូតកម្ពុជា រាជធានីឡុងដ៍
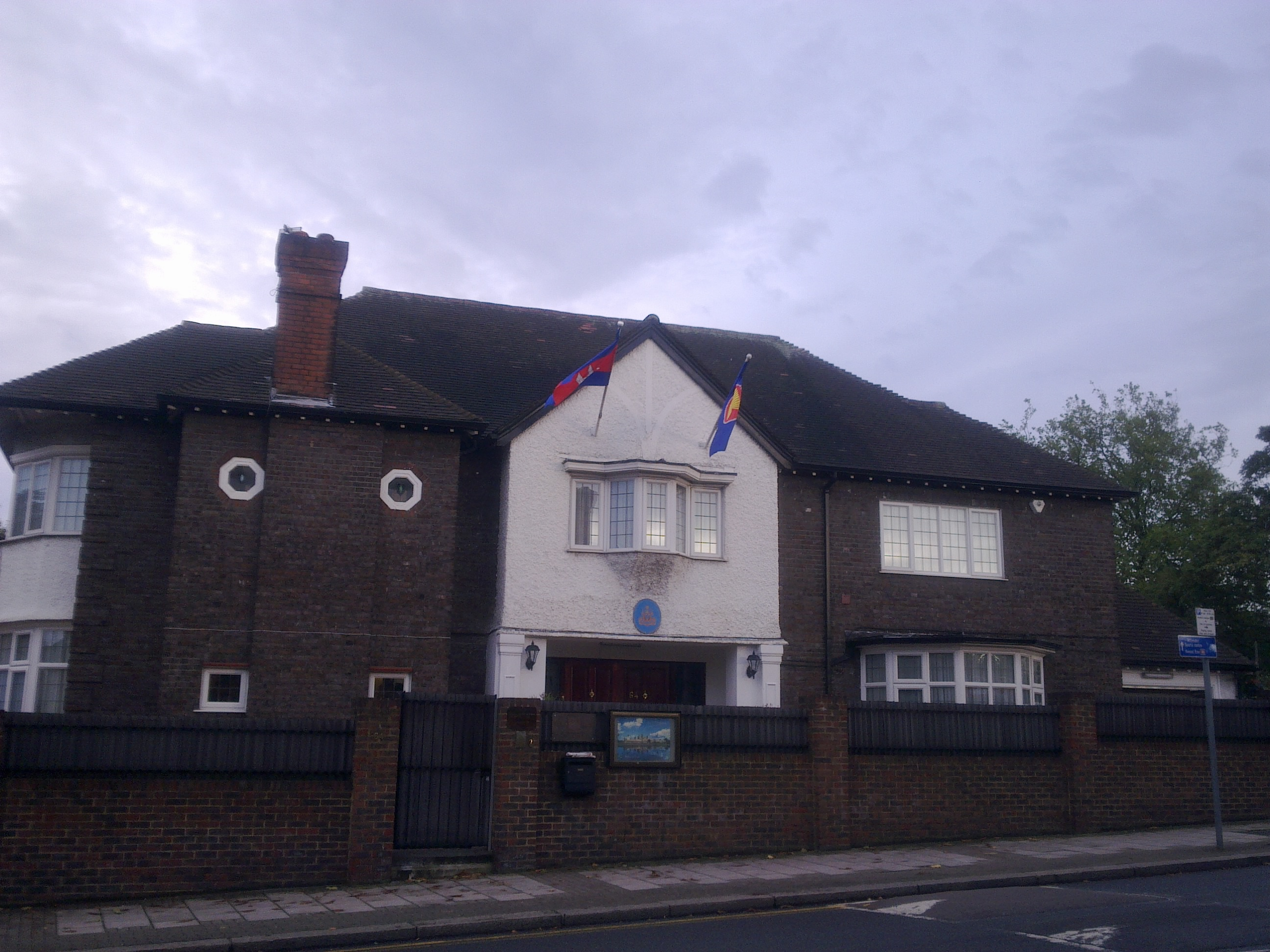
- Location: Willesden Green, London
- Address: 64 Brondesbury Park, London, NW6 7AT
- Coordinates: 51°32′43.8″N 0°13′17.1″W
- Ambassador: Her Excellency Tuot Panha

The Royal Embassy of Cambodia in London is the diplomatic mission of Cambodia in the United Kingdom, located near the localities of Willesden Green and Brondesbury Park. It is unusual in being relatively far from central London - it is the northernmost of any embassy in the city - as well as for being located in a house on a suburban street. The embassy was formerly located at 28-32 Wellington Road, in St. John's Wood - this same building also housed the Embassy of South Sudan at one time.

In 2013, British author Zadie Smith published a short story entitled The Embassy of Cambodia in The New Yorker magazine, which was later published in book format.

== Gallery ==
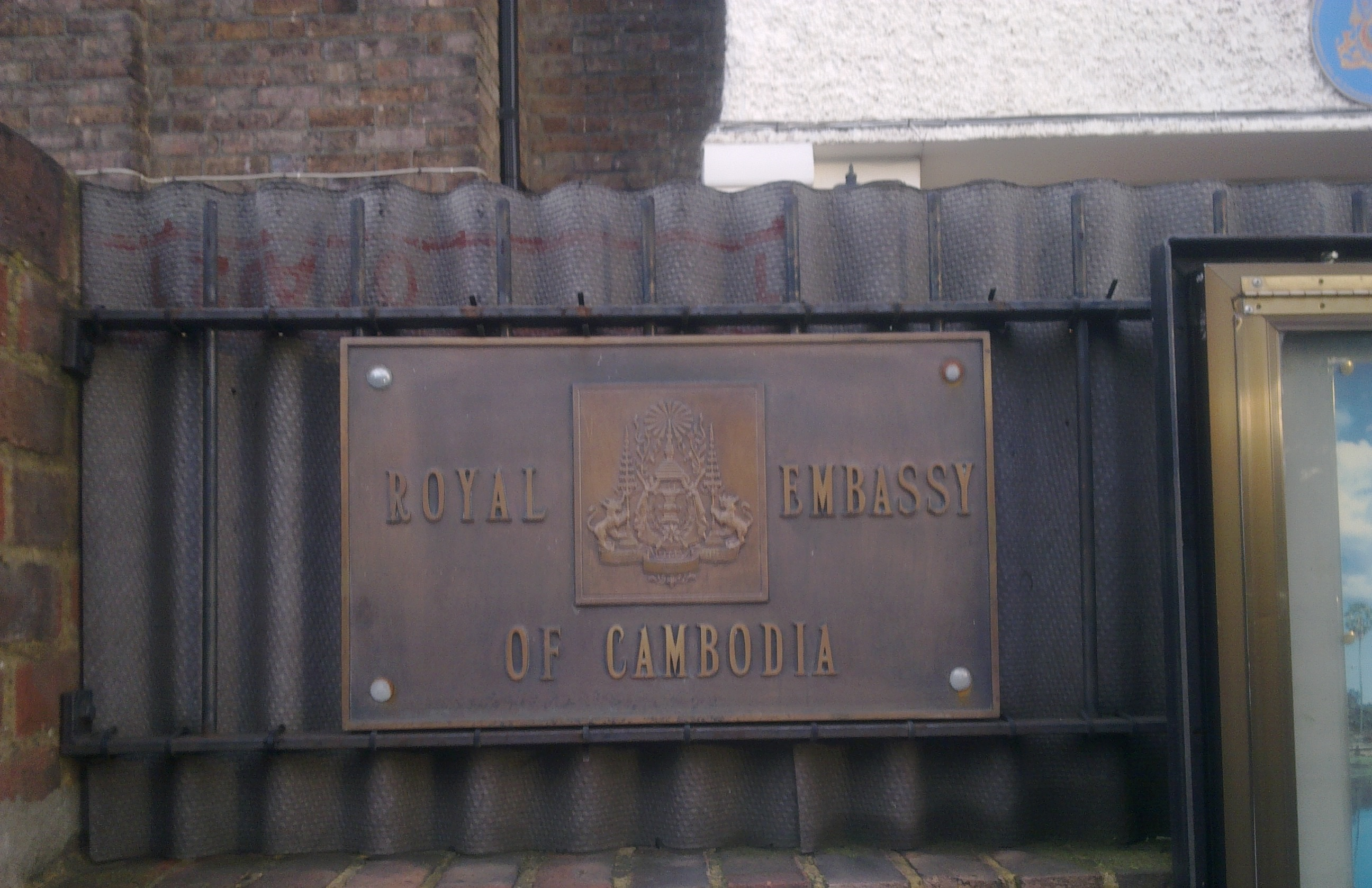
Plaque outside the embassy depicting the Royal Arms of Cambodia

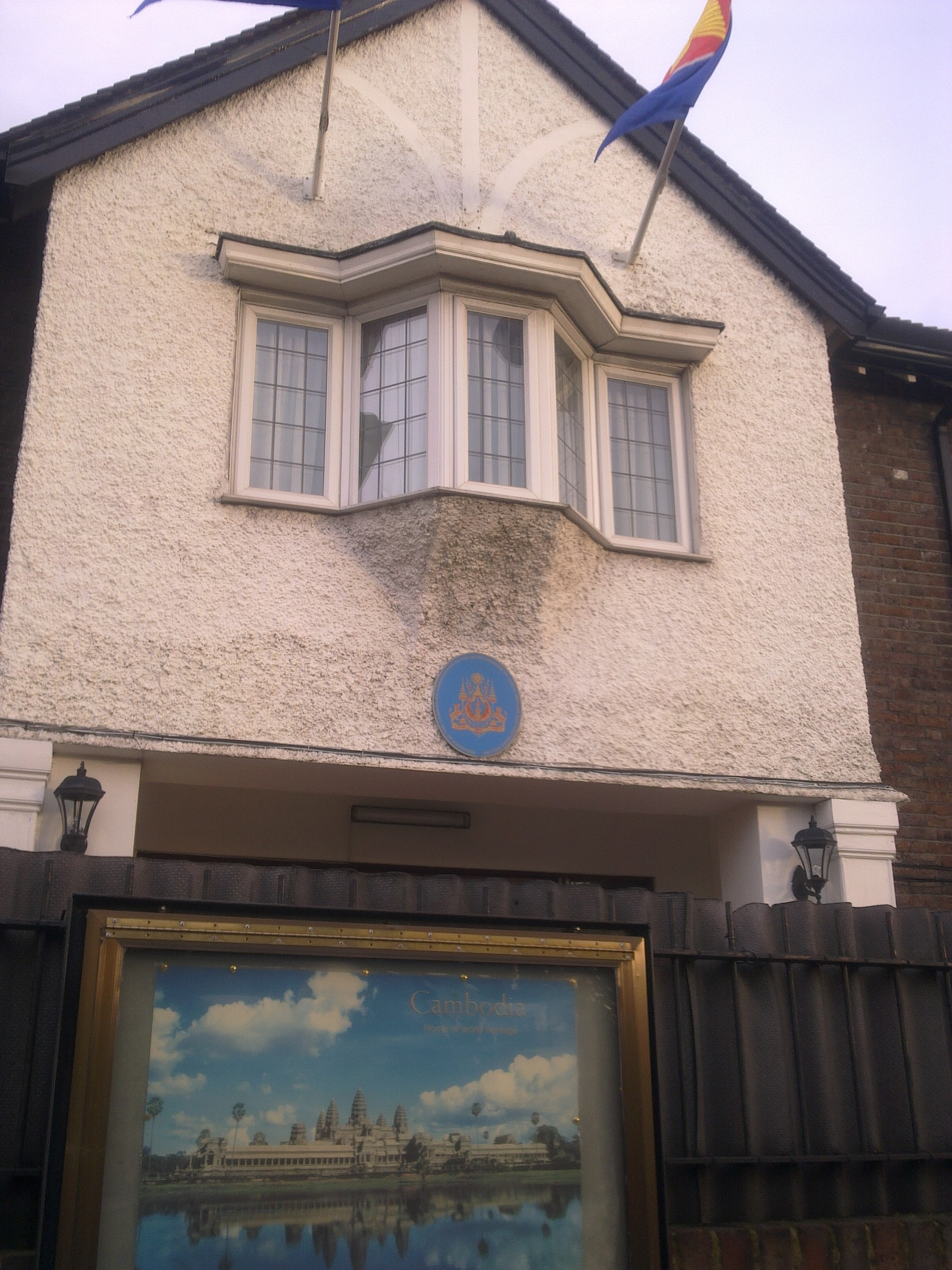
The front of the embassy

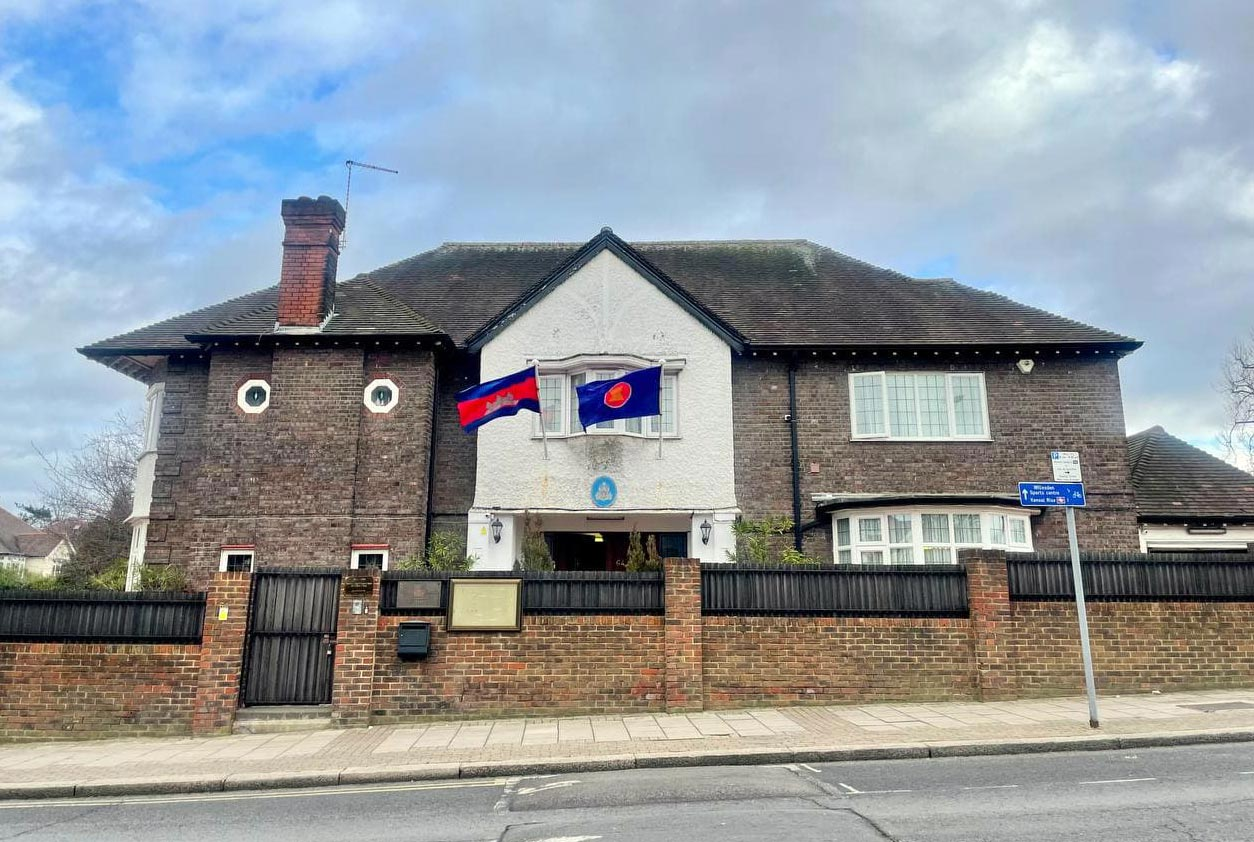
The Royal Embassy of Cambodia in London
