= List of ambassadors of Cambodia =

This is a list of current ambassadors of Cambodia around the world.

As of April 2026, The Kingdom of Cambodia has a total of 30 resident ambassadors/high commissioners (some of whom are concurrently accredited to other countries).

== List of Ambassadors ==
Host country	Ambassador	Concurrent accreditation
Australia	H.E. Dr. Cheunboran Chanborey	
Belgium	H.E. Mrs. Kimsour Sovannary	European UnionAustriaThe NetherlandsLuxembourg
Brazil	H.E. Mr. PRAK Nguon Hong	
Brunei	H.E. Mr. CHEY Ratha	
Bulgaria	H.E. Mr. CHEA Chanboribo	CyprusEstoniaGreeceLatviaLithuaniaRomania
China	H.E. Mrs. SOEUNG Rathchavy	
Cuba	H.E. Mr. CHEA Thireak	Nicaragua
Egypt	H.E. Mr. SOM Visal	AlgeriaMoroccoEthiopiaSaudi ArabiaOmanAfrican Union
France	H.E. LUY David	MonacoItalyMaltaPortugalSpainAndorra
Germany	H.E. Mr. CHHEANG Thyra	Czech RepublicCroatiaHungaryPolandSlovakiaSloveniaUkraine
India	H.E. Mrs. RATH Many	BangladeshSri LankaIranNepalMaldives
Indonesia	H.E. Mr. TEAN Samnang	
Japan	H.E. Mr. Chum Sounry	
Kuwait	H.E. Mr. SMAN Manan	BahrainQatarUnited Arab Emirates
Laos	H.E. Mr. HULKRANG Phanang	
Malaysia	H.E. Mr. OUK Chandara	
Myanmar	H.E. Mr. CHENG Manith	
North Korea	H.E. Mr. SIENG Bunvuth	
Philippines	H.E. Mr. Sin Saream	
Russia	H.E. Mr. PICHKHUN Panha	BelarusArmenia
Serbia	H.E. Mr. TAN Bunpa	
Singapore	H.E. Mr. SOK Khoeun	
South Korea	H.E. KHUON Phon Rattanak	
Switzerland	H.E. Mr. IN Dara	
Thailand	H.E. Mr. HUN Saroeun	
Timor Leste	H.E. Mr. CHUN Sovannarith	
Turkey	H.E. Mr. SOK Chea	TajikistanAzerbaijanKazakhstanGeorgiaKyrgyzstanPakistanTurkmenistanIsrael
United Kingdom	H.E. Mrs. TUOT Panha	DenmarkFinlandNorwaySwedenIreland
United States	H.E. Mr. KOY Kuong	
Vietnam	H.E. Mrs. CHEA Kimtha	

== See also ==
- List of diplomatic missions of Cambodia
- List of diplomatic missions in Cambodia
- Lists of ambassadors
