= List of diplomatic missions of Cambodia =

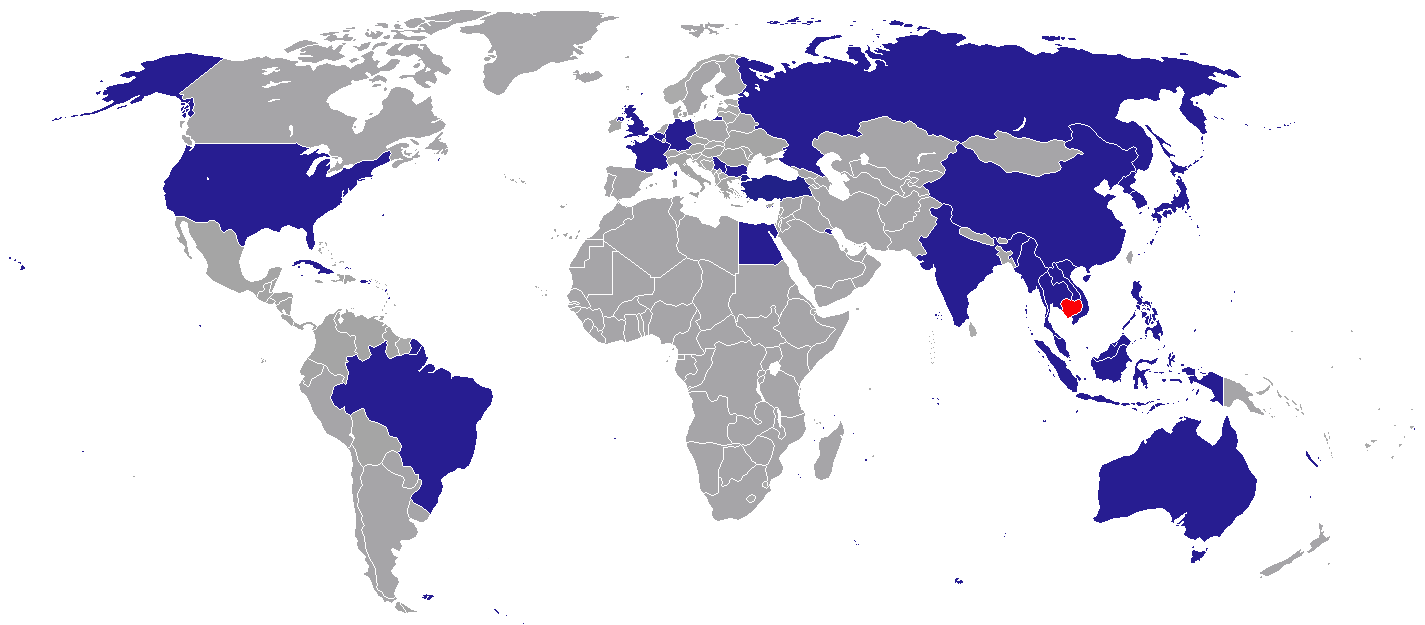
Diplomatic missions of Cambodia

Cambodia's cadre of diplomatic personnel defected or were decimated during the reign of the Khmer Rouge. In the 1980s the Soviet Union and Vietnam slowly rebuilt the capacity of the country's foreign ministry, although the country's foreign policy was effectively controlled by the Vietnamese Government. Since the departure of Vietnamese troops in 1989 and signing of the Paris Peace Agreement in 1991, Cambodia has moved out of its international isolation.

This listing excludes honorary consulates.

== Current missions ==
=== Africa ===
Host country	Host city	Mission	Head of mission	Concurrent accreditation	Ref.
Egypt	Cairo (Note: Located in the city of Giza, which forms part of the Greater Cairo area.)	Embassy	Som Visal	Countries: Algeria; Burkina Faso; Kenya; Morocco; Rwanda; Saudi Arabia; Tunisia	

=== Americas ===
Host country	Host city	Mission	Head of mission	Concurrent accreditation	Ref.
Brazil	Brasília	Embassy	Prak Nguon Hong	Countries: Argentina; Colombia; Chile; Paraguay; Peru; Uruguay	
Cuba	Havana	Embassy	Pho Sam Ang	Countries: Belize; Nicaragua; Panama; Venezuela	
United States	Washington, D.C.	Embassy	Koy Kuong	Countries: Mexico	

=== Asia ===
Host country	Host city	Mission	Head of mission	Concurrent accreditation	Ref.
Brunei	Bandar Seri Begawan	Embassy	Chey Ratha		
China	Beijing	Embassy	Soeung Rathchavy		
China	Chongqing	Consulate-General	Van Vithyea		
China	Guangzhou	Consulate-General	Tun Thona		
China	Haikou	Consulate-General	Iv Sokhom		
China	Hong Kong	Consulate-General	Yos Sokhemrin		
China	Jinan	Consulate General	Mao Samneang		
China	Kunming	Consulate-General	Heng Pisal		
China	Nanning	Consulate-General	Taing Sokngorn		
China	Shanghai	Consulate-General	Nguon Visoth		
China	Xi'an	Consulate-General	Heng Poeu		
India	New Delhi	Embassy	Rath Many	Countries: Bangladesh; Iran; Maldives; Mauritius; Nepal; Sri Lanka	
Indonesia	Jakarta	Embassy	Tean Samnang		
Japan	Tokyo	Embassy	Tuy Ry		
Kuwait	Kuwait City	Embassy	Chhay Makara	Countries: Bahrain; Oman; Qatar; United Arab Emirates	
Laos	Vientiane	Embassy	Hulkrang Phanang		
Laos	Pakse	Consulate-General	Dav Bothmony		
Malaysia	Kuala Lumpur	Embassy	Ouk Chandara		
Myanmar	Yangon	Embassy	Cheng Manith		
North Korea	Pyongyang	Embassy	Sieng Bunvuth		
Philippines	Manila	Embassy	Sin Saream		
Singapore	Singapore	Embassy	Sok Khoeun		
South Korea	Seoul	Embassy	Khuon Phon Rattanak		
Thailand	Bangkok	Embassy	Hun Saroeun		
Thailand	Sa Kaeo	Consulate-General	Kim Sovanna		
Timor-Leste	Dili	Embassy	Chun Sovannarith		
Turkey	Ankara	Embassy	Sok Chea	Countries: Azerbaijan; Georgia; Israel; Kazakhstan; Kyrgyzstan; Pakistan; Tajikistan; Turkmenistan	
Vietnam	Hanoi	Embassy	Touch Sopharath		
Vietnam	Ho Chi Minh City	Consulate-General	Luon Buovadh		

=== Europe ===
Host country	Host city	Mission	Head of mission	Concurrent accreditation	Ref.
Belgium	Brussels	Embassy	Kimsour Sovannary	Countries: Austria; Luxembourg; Netherlands; Multilateral Organizations: European Union; Organisation for the Prohibition of Chemical Weapons	
Bulgaria	Sofia	Embassy	Chea Chanboribo	Countries: Cyprus; Estonia; Greece; Latvia; Lithuania; Romania	
France	Paris	Embassy	Luy David	Countries: Andorra; Italy; Malta; Monaco; Portugal; Spain	
Germany	Berlin	Embassy	Chheang Thyra	Countries: Czechia; Croatia; Hungary; Poland; Slovakia; Slovenia; Ukraine	
Russia	Moscow	Embassy	Pichkhun Panha	Countries: Armenia; Belarus	
Serbia	Belgrade	Embassy	Tan Bunpa	Countries: Moldova; Montenegro	
United Kingdom	London	Embassy	Tuot Panha	Countries: Denmark; Ethiopia; Finland; Ireland; Norway; Sweden; Multilateral Organizations: African Union	

=== Oceania ===
Host country	Host city	Mission	Head of mission	Concurrent accreditation	Ref.
Australia	Canberra	Embassy	Nom Piseth	Countries: New Zealand	

=== Multilateral organisations ===
Organization	Host city	Host country	Mission	Head of mission	Concurrent accreditation	Ref.
Association of Southeast Asian Nations	Jakarta	Indonesia	Permanent Mission	Noy Choumneanh		
United Nations	New York City	United States	Permanent Mission	Keo Chhea	Countries: Canada; Guatemala	
United Nations	Geneva	Switzerland	Permanent Mission	Ke Sovann	Countries: Liechtenstein; Switzerland	
UNESCO	Paris	France	Permanent Mission	Kosal Long		

== Gallery ==
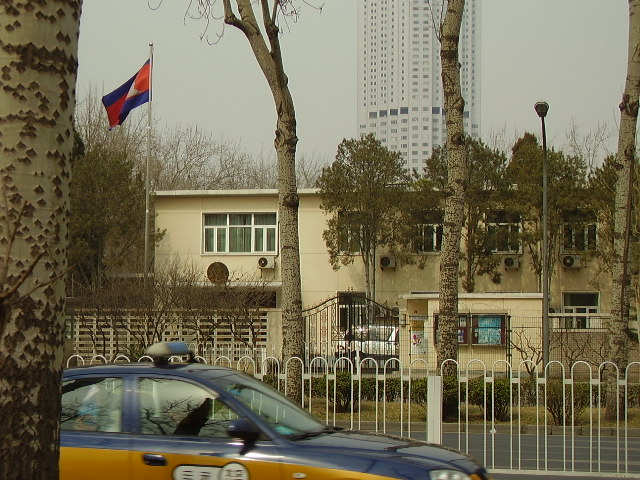
Embassy in Beijing

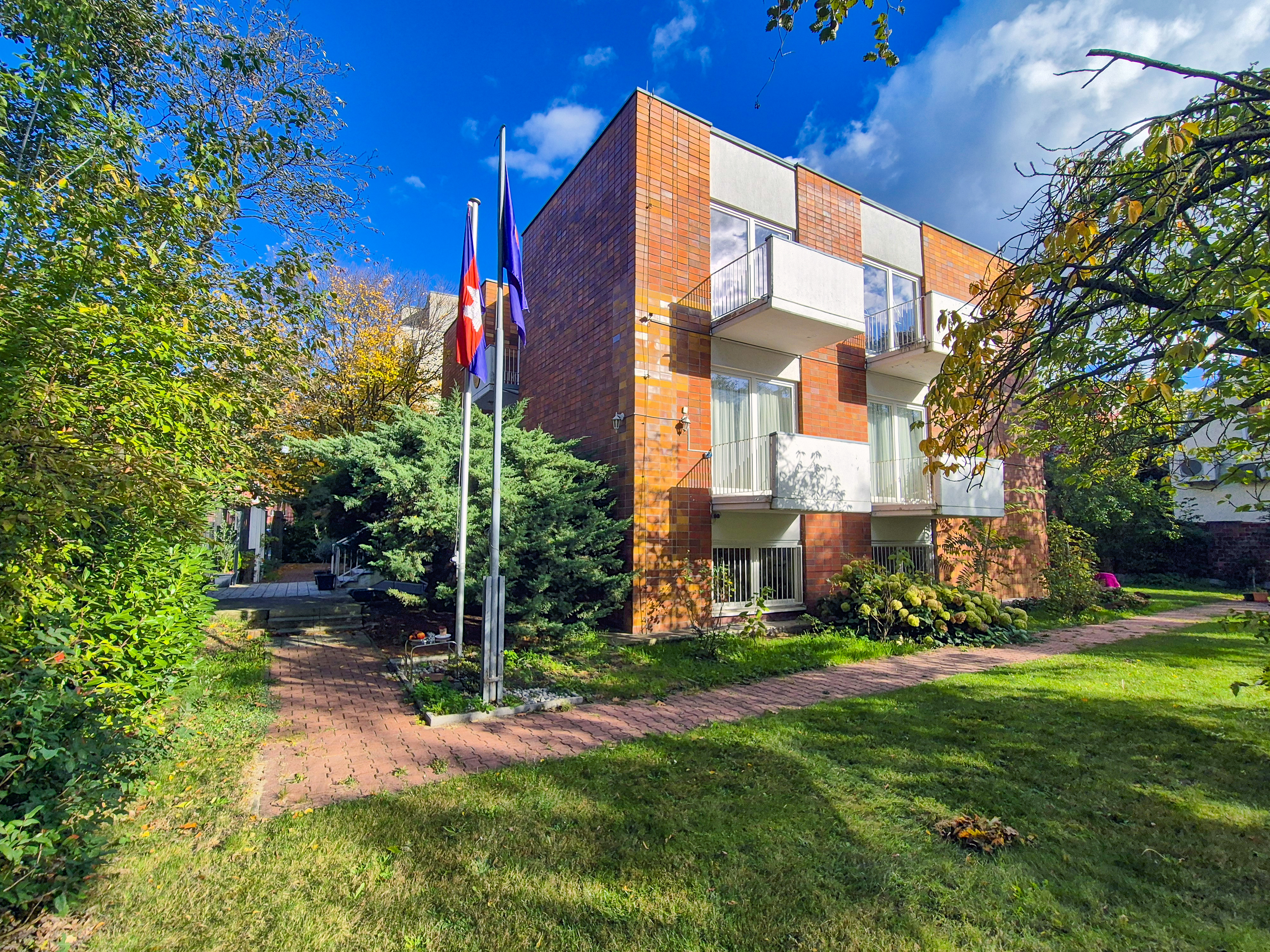
Embassy in Berlin

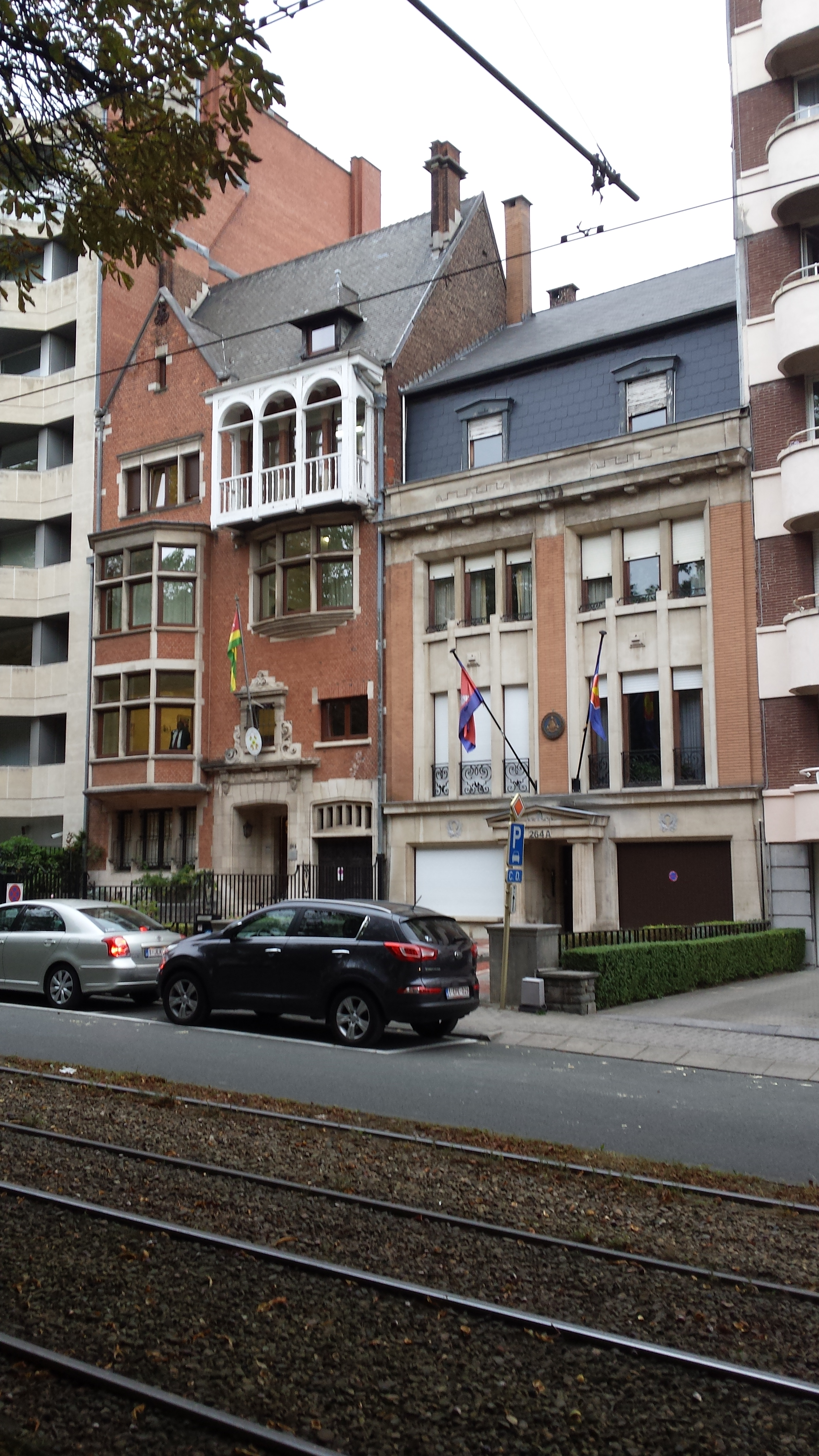
Embassy in Brussels

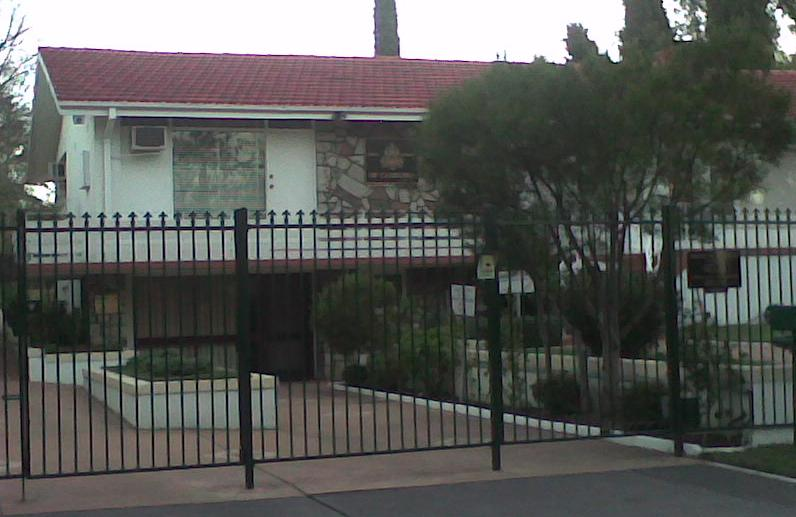
Embassy in Canberra

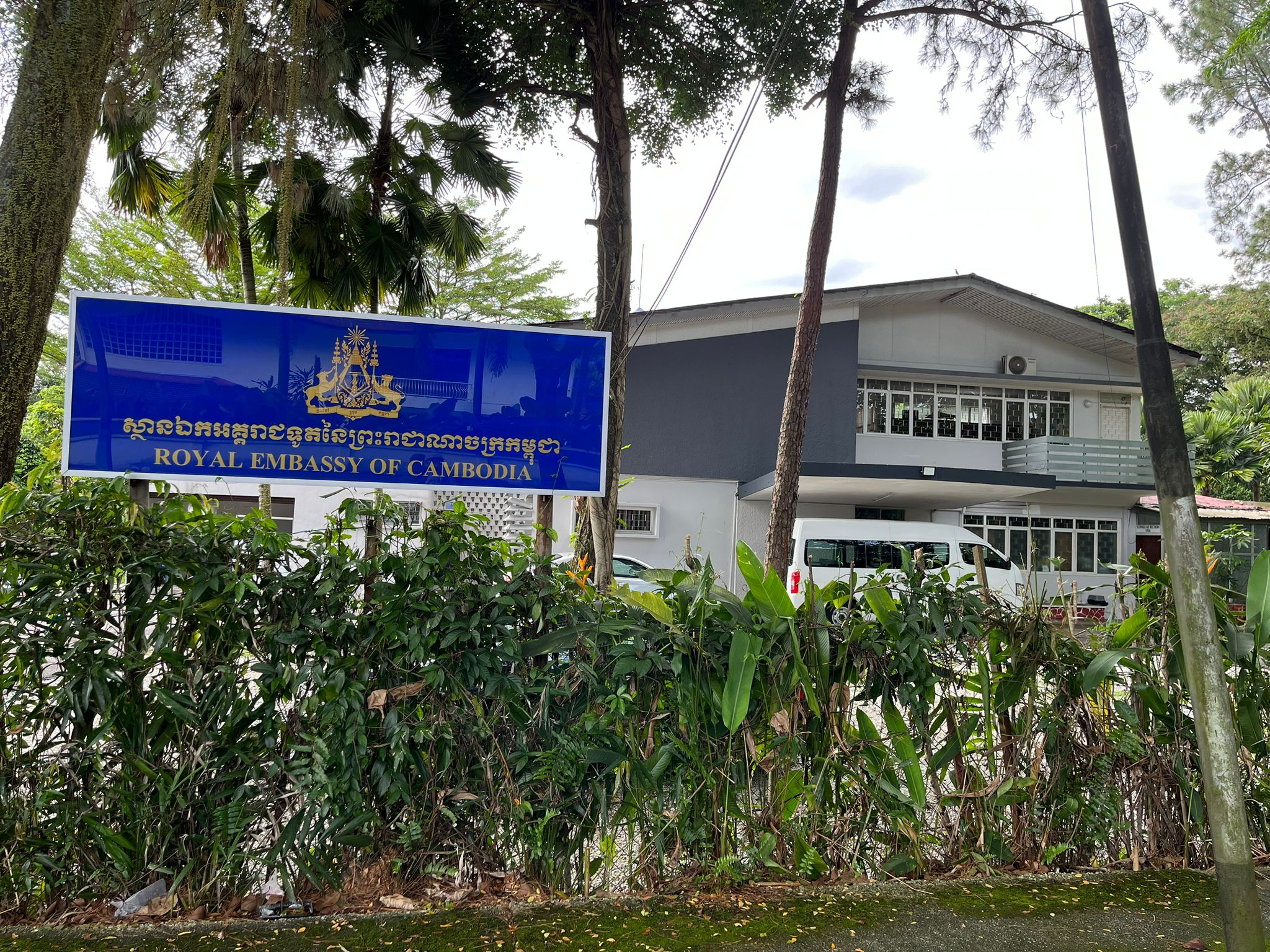
Embassy in Kuala Lumpur

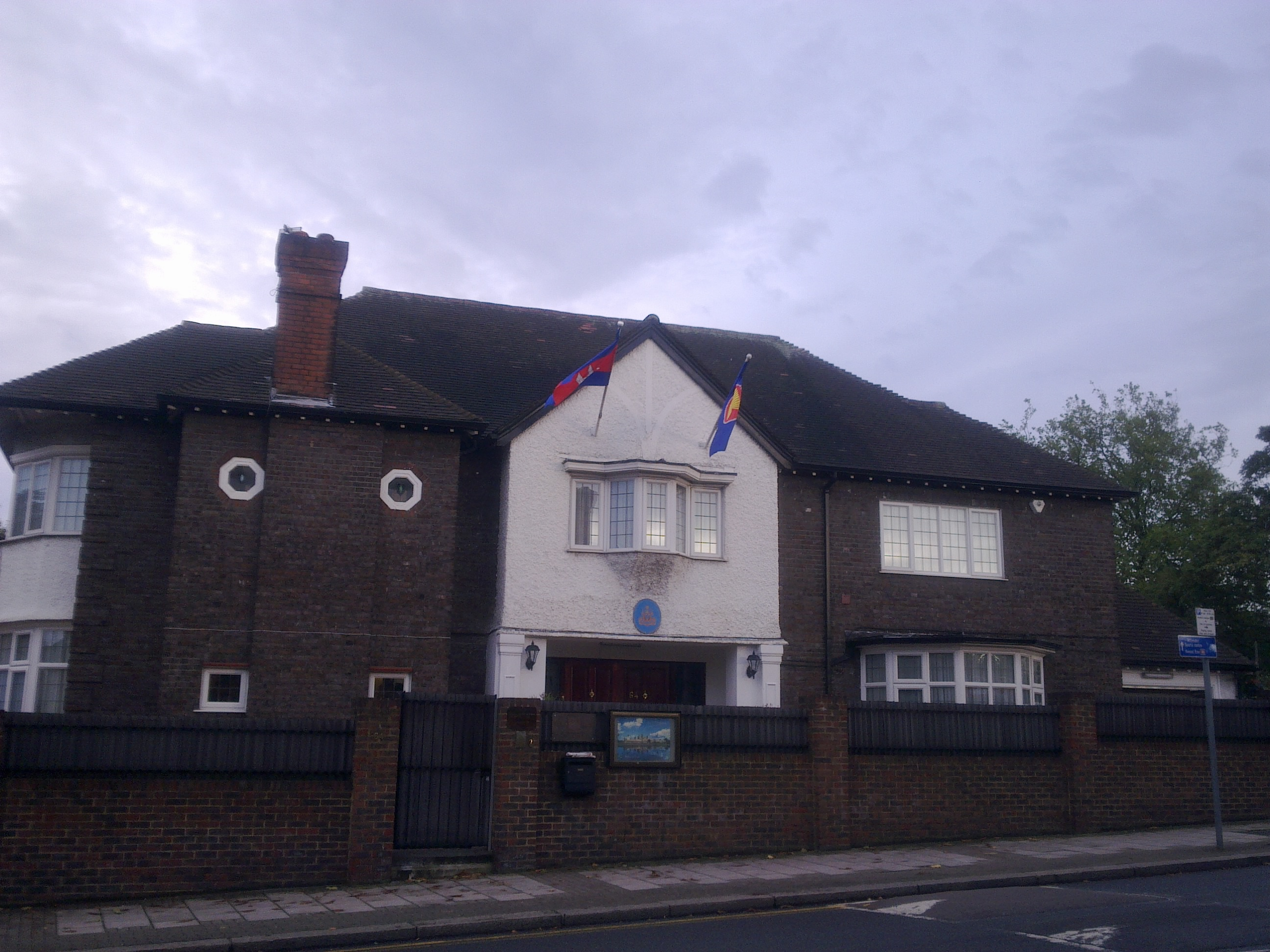
Embassy in London

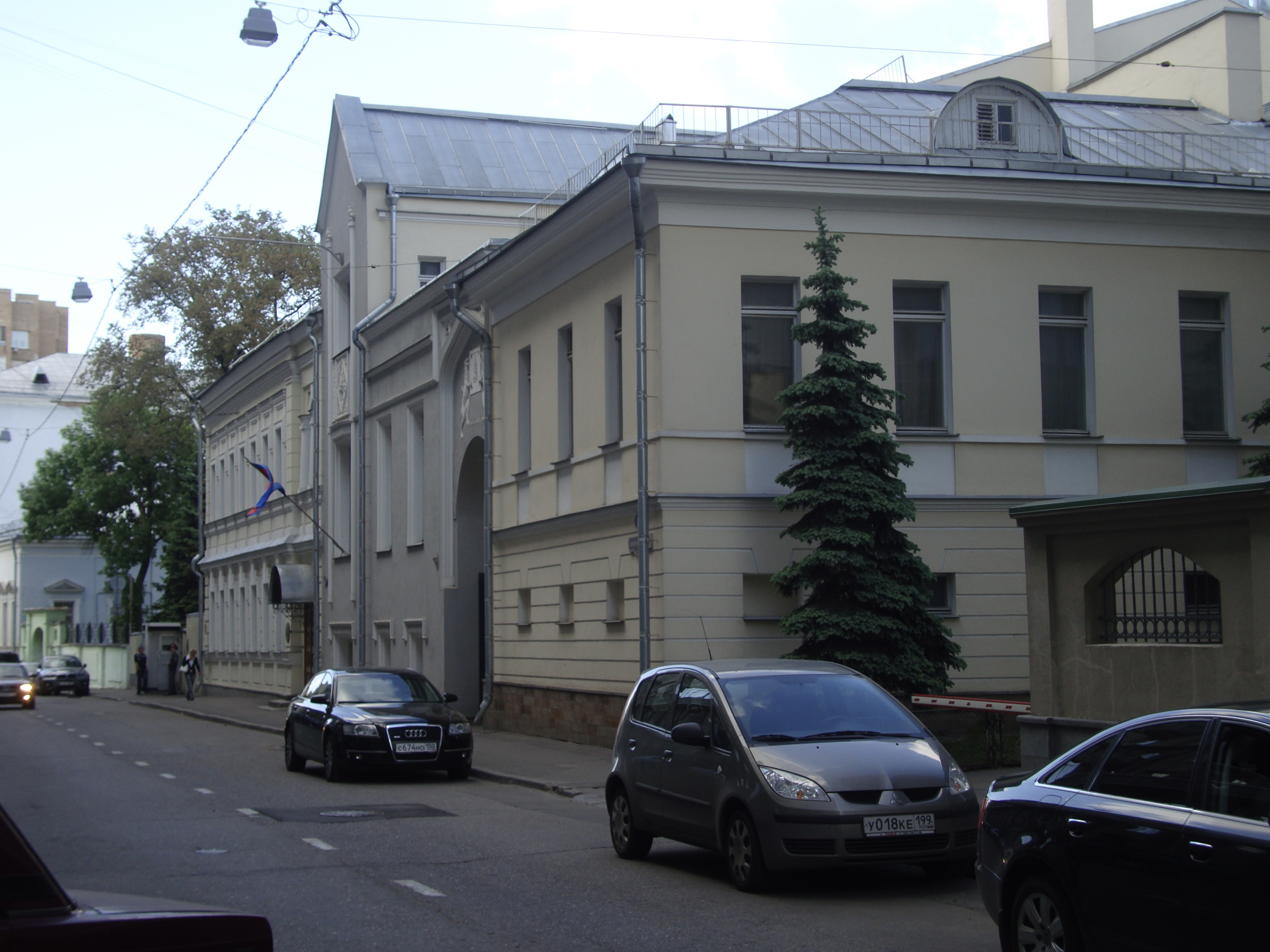
Embassy in Moscow

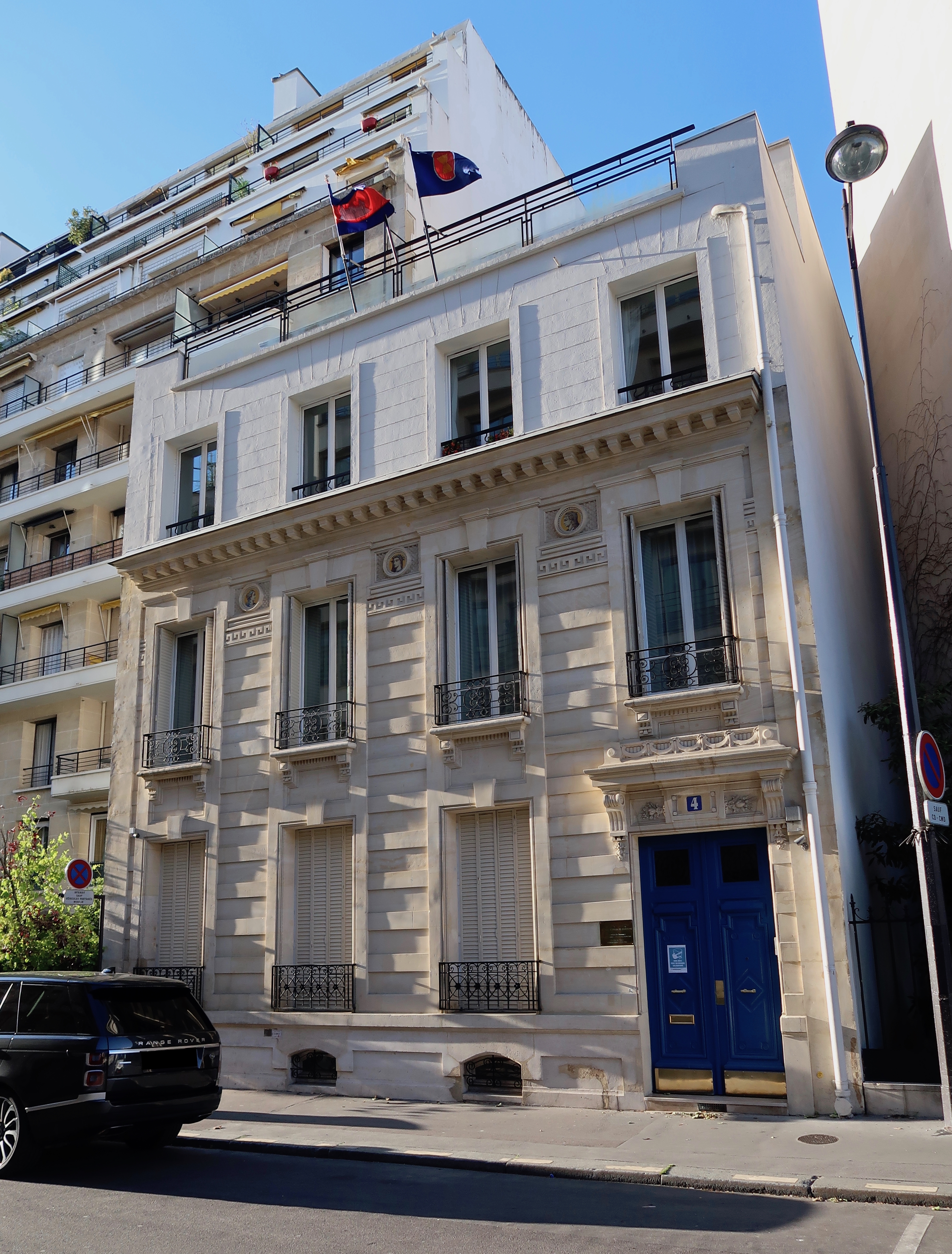
Embassy in Paris

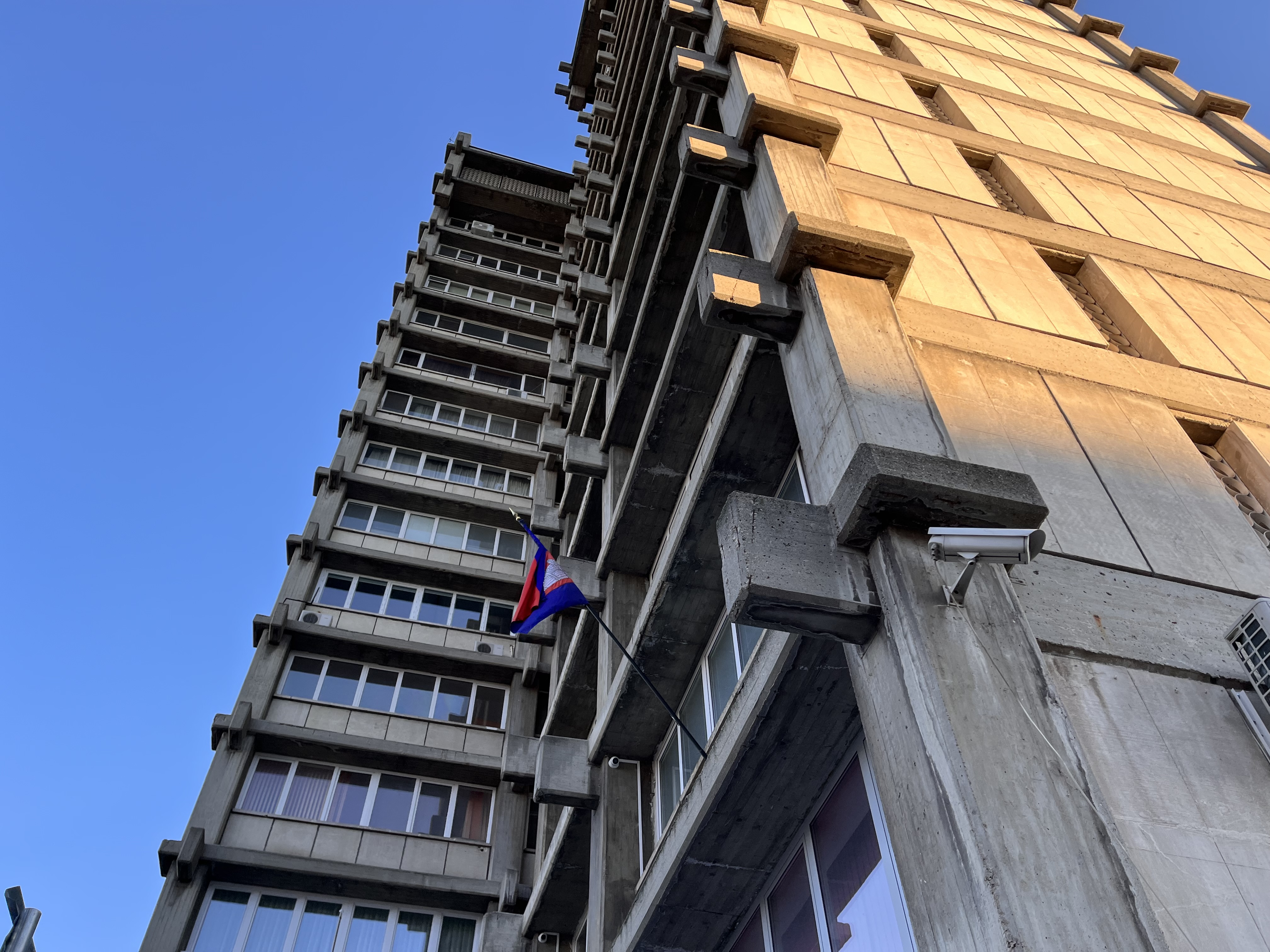
Embassy in Sofia

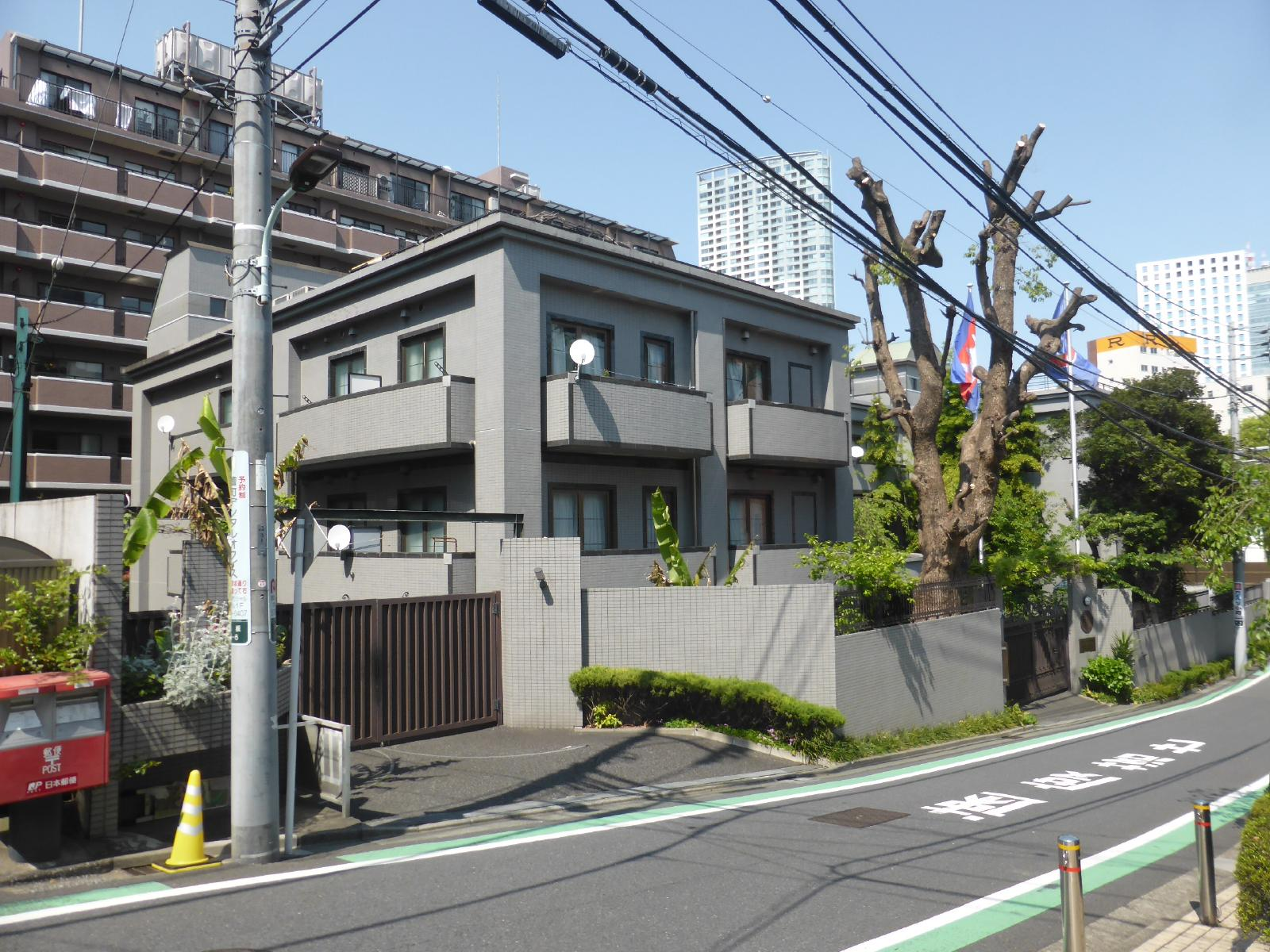
Embassy in Tokyo

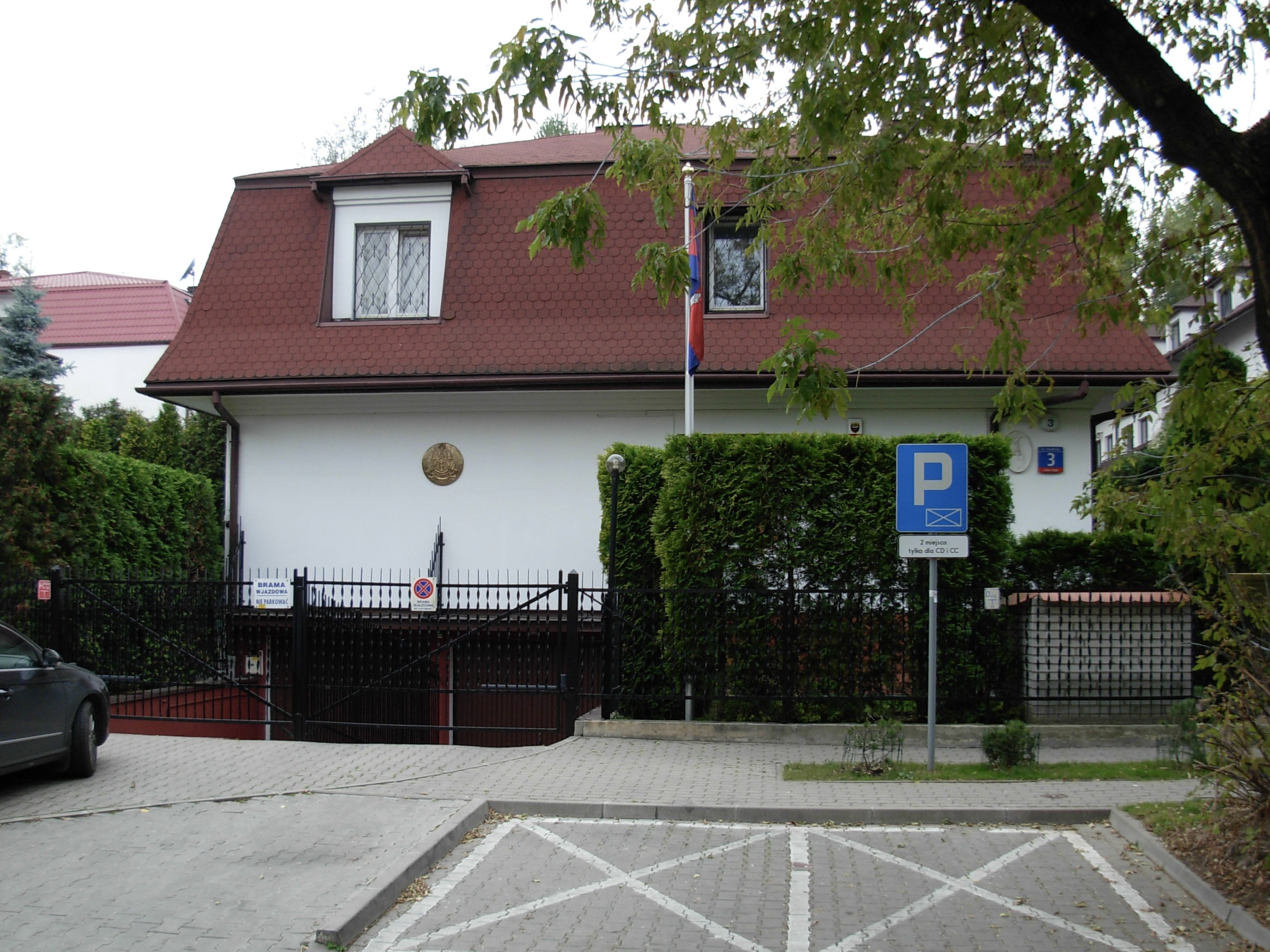
Embassy in Warsaw

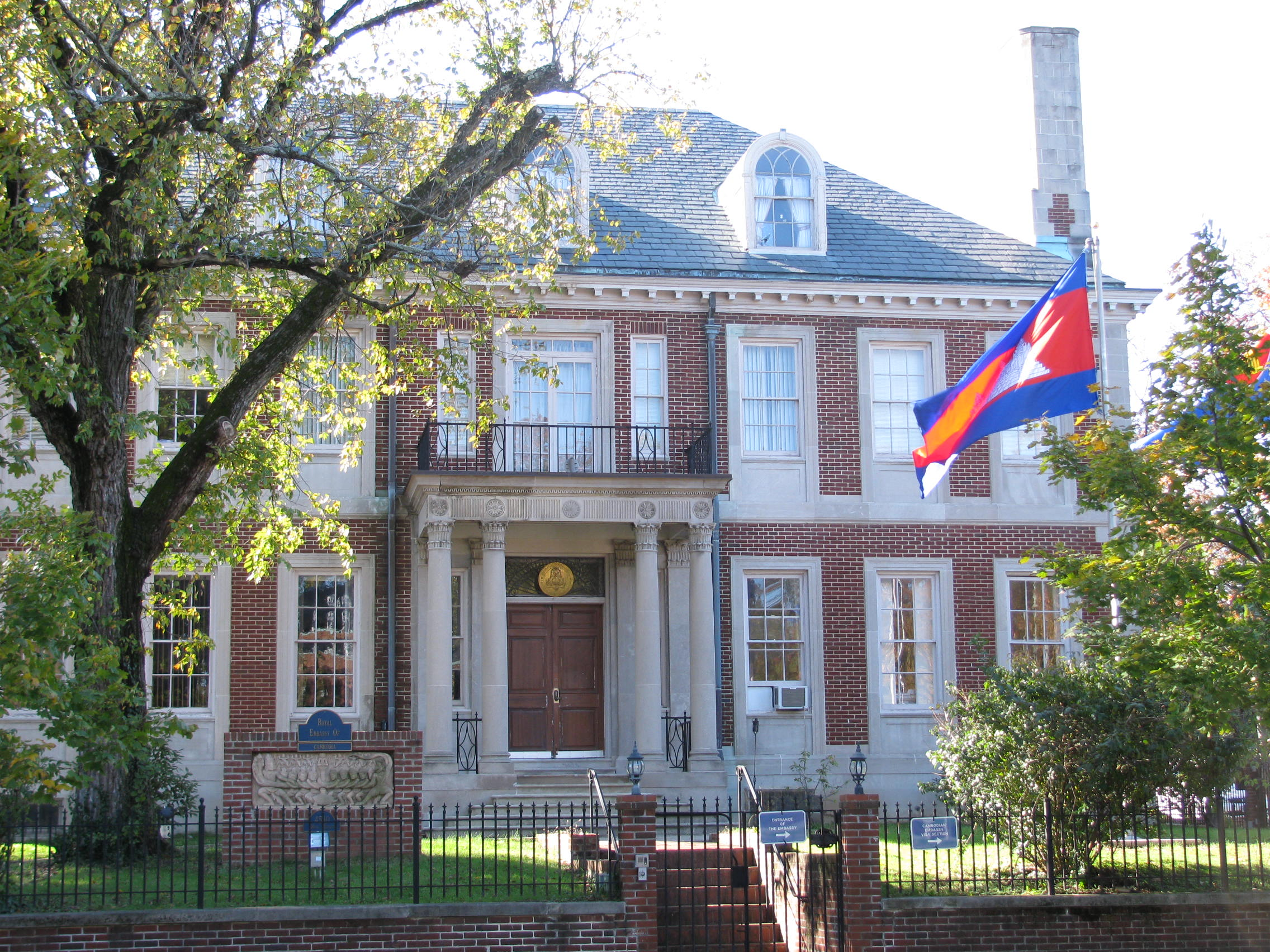
Embassy in Washington, D.C.

== Closed missions ==
=== Africa ===
Host country	Host city	Mission	Year closed	Ref.
Senegal	Dakar	Embassy	Unknown	

=== Europe ===
Host country	Host city	Mission	Year closed	Ref.
East Germany	East Berlin	Embassy	1977	
Hungary	Budapest	Embassy	Unknown	
Poland	Warsaw	Embassy	2009	

=== Asia ===
Host country	Host city	Mission	Year closed	Ref.
Israel	Jerusalem	Embassy	1975	

== Missions to open ==
Host country	Host city	Mission	Ref.
Canada	Ottawa	Embassy	
Nepal	Kathmandu	Embassy	
Pakistan	Islamabad	Embassy	
South Africa	Pretoria	Embassy	
Thailand	Songkhla	Consulate-General	

== See also ==
- Foreign relations of Cambodia
- List of diplomatic missions in Cambodia
- Visa policy of Cambodia
- PRK/SOC
