= List of diplomatic missions in Cambodia =

This is a list of diplomatic missions in Cambodia. At present, the capital city of Phnom Penh hosts 28 embassies and a delegation of the European Union.

Several other countries have missions accredited from other capitals, mostly in Bangkok, Beijing, Hanoi, and Seoul.

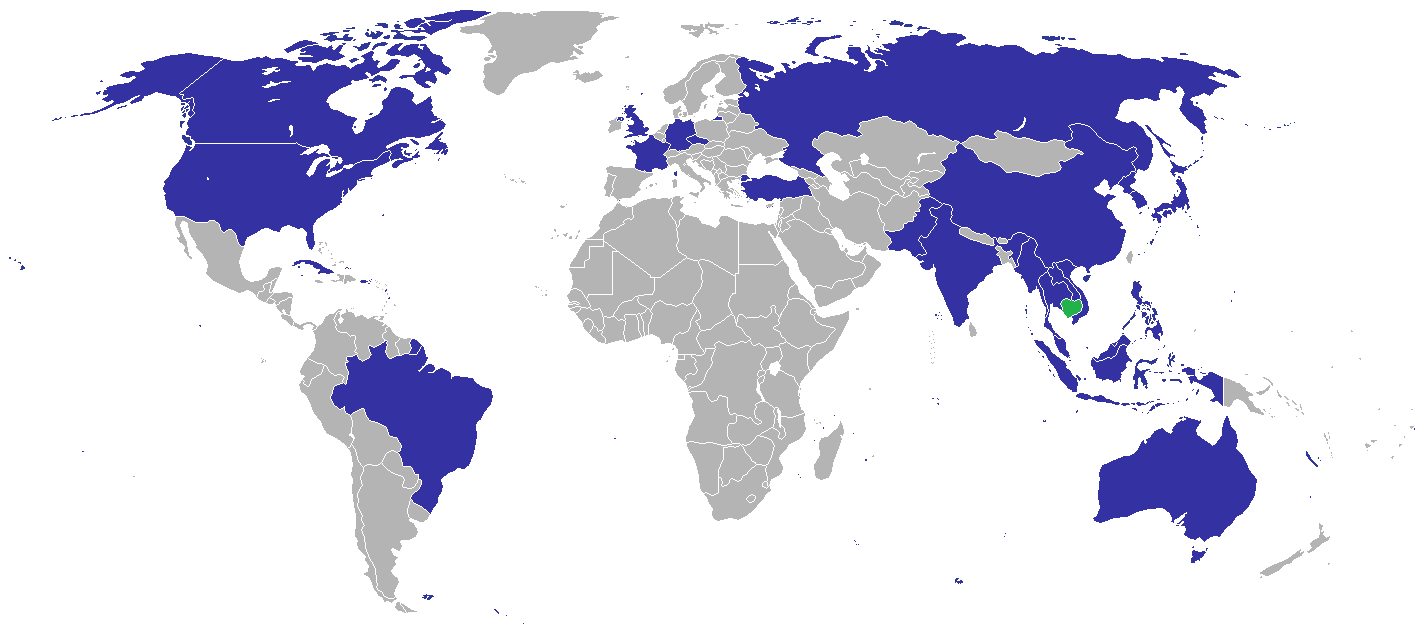
Map of diplomatic missions in Cambodia

== Resident missions in Phnom Penh ==
=== Embassies ===
1. Australia
2. Brazil
3. Brunei
4. Canada
5. China
6. Cuba
7. Czech Republic
8. France
9. Germany
10. India
11. Indonesia
12. Japan
13. Laos
14. Malaysia
15. Myanmar
16. North Korea
17. Pakistan
18. Philippines
19. Russia
20. Singapore
21. South Korea
22. Sovereign Military Order of Malta
23. Timor-Leste
24. Thailand
25. Turkey
26. United Kingdom
27. United States
28. Vietnam

=== Other representations or delegations ===
1. European Union (Delegation)
2. Hungary (Embassy office)
3. Switzerland (Cooperation office & consular agency)
4. United Nations (Resident coordinator's office)

== Consular missions ==
=== Battambang ===
- Vietnam (Consulate-General)

=== Siem Reap ===
- China (Consulate)
- Japan (Consular office)
- South Korea (Consulate)

=== Sihanoukville ===
- China (Consulate)
- Vietnam (Consulate-General)

=== Stung Treng ===
- Laos (Consulate-General)

== Non-resident embassies accredited to Cambodia ==
=== Resident in Bangkok, Thailand ===
- Argentina
- Austria
- Bangladesh
- Belgium
- Chile
- Colombia
- Denmark
- Egypt
- Finland
- Greece
- Guatemala
- Holy See
- Israel
- Italy
- Kenya
- Maldives
- Morocco
- Netherlands
- New Zealand
- Nepal
- Norway
- Panama
- Poland
- Portugal
- Slovakia
- South Africa
- Spain
- Sri Lanka
- Sweden
- United Arab Emirates

=== Resident in Beijing, China ===
- Barbados
- Benin
- Chad
- Congo-Kinshasa
- Cyprus
- Cape Verde
- Ethiopia
- Eritrea
- Guinea-Bissau
- Iceland
- Ivory Coast
- Jamaica
- Liberia
- Mali
- Malta
- Mauritania
- Madagascar
- Namibia
- Senegal
- Seychelles
- Sierra Leone
- South Sudan
- Somalia
- Suriname
- Togo
- Tunisia

=== Resident in Hanoi, Vietnam ===
- Algeria
- Angola
- Armenia
- Azerbaijan
- Belarus
- Bulgaria
- Haiti
- Hungary
- Iran
- Iraq
- Ireland
- Kazakhstan
- Mexico
- Nicaragua
- Oman
- Palestine
- Qatar
- Romania
- Saudi Arabia
- Ukraine
- Venezuela

=== Resident in Kuala Lumpur, Malaysia ===
- Croatia
- Gambia
- Georgia
- Ghana
- Libya
- Papua New Guinea
- Peru
- Tanzania
- Turkmenistan
- Uganda
- Uruguay
- Yemen
- Zambia
- Zimbabwe

=== Resident in Seoul, South Korea ===
- Paraguay
- Rwanda
- Slovenia

=== Resident elsewhere ===
- Bahrain (Jakarta)
- El Salvador (New Delhi)
- Eswatini (New York City)
- Marshall Islands (Taipei)
- Mongolia (Vientiane)
- Nigeria (Manila)
- Serbia (Jakarta)
- Taiwan (Ho Chi Minh City)

== Former Embassy ==
- Bulgaria
- Israel
- Kuwait
- Poland

== Missions to open ==
- Bangladesh (Embassy)
- Egypt (Embassy)
- Nepal (Embassy)
- Saudi Arabia (Embassy)
- Serbia (Diplomatic office)
- Ukraine (Embassy)

== See also ==
- List of diplomatic missions of Cambodia
- Visa requirements for Cambodian citizens
