= Passport stamp =

Inked impression in a passport

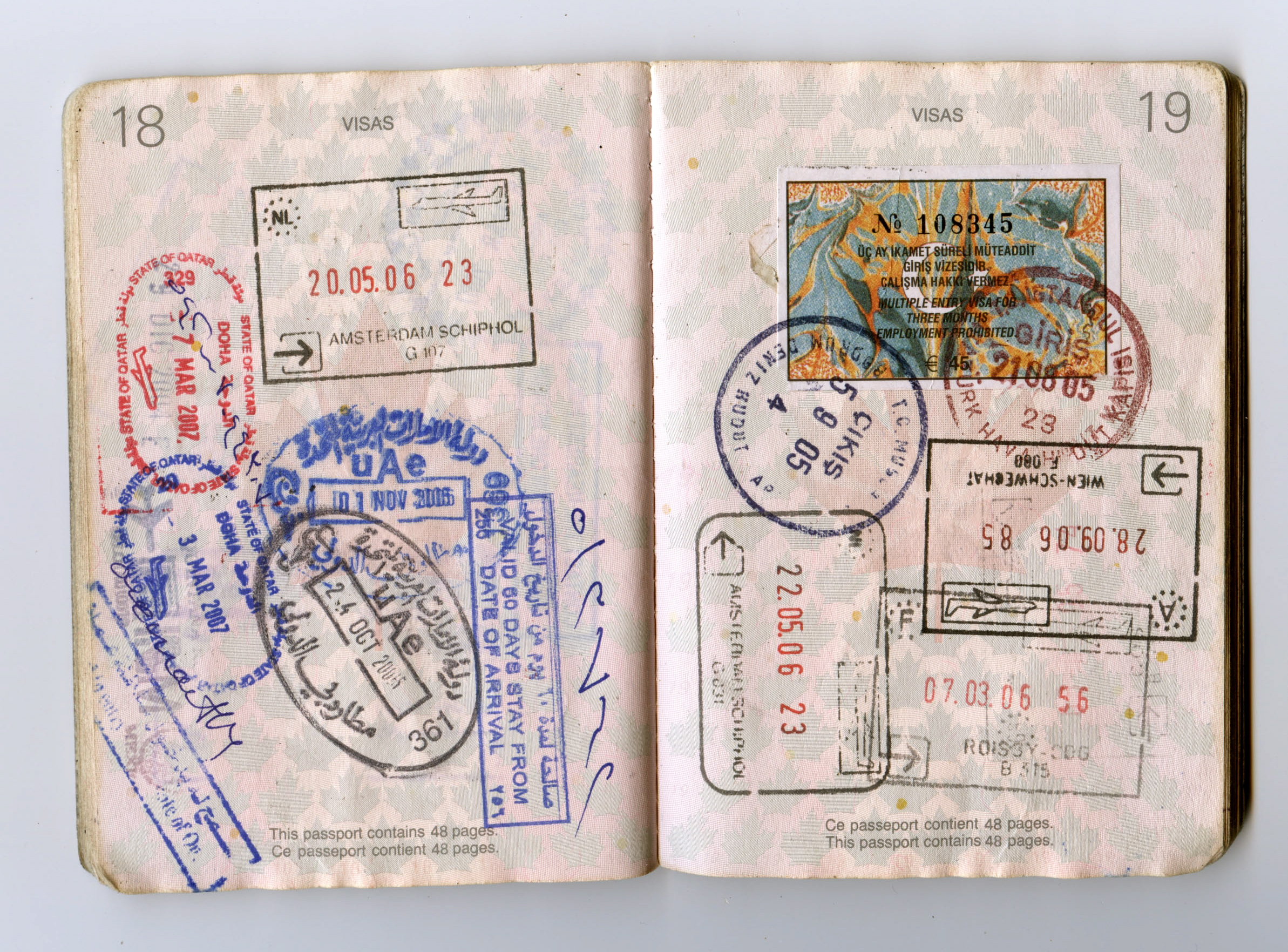
Various passport stamps inside of a passport.

A passport stamp is an inked impression in a passport typically made by a rubber stamp upon entering or exiting a territory.

Passport stamps may occasionally take the form of stickers, such as entry stamps from Japan, South Korea, and Sri Lanka. Depending on nationality, a visitor may not receive a stamp at all (unless specifically requested), such as Albania, or North Macedonia. Foreign visitors to Iran (if your passport from visa-free country - a stamp is affixed) and North Korea also do not receive stamps in passports. Most countries issue exit stamps in addition to entry stamps. A few countries issue only entry stamps, including Canada, El Salvador, Ireland, New Zealand, Mexico, the United Kingdom and the United States.

Argentina, Australia, Cambodia, Cuba, Hong Kong, Israel, Macau, Jamaica, and Singapore do not stamp passports upon entry or exit. Some of these countries or regions issue landing slips instead. Australia does not issue any form of physical evidence of entry or exit as a matter of course at the primary line, but will provide entry and exit stamps upon request to a supervisor. Argentina and Singapore send digital entry receipts containing conditions of entry via email. The European Union (Schengen Area) replaced passport stamps with its Entry/Exit System on 10 April 2026.

Because there is no national authority, Antarctica does not have a passport stamp. However, the various research stations there may provide souvenir ones on request.

== Use ==
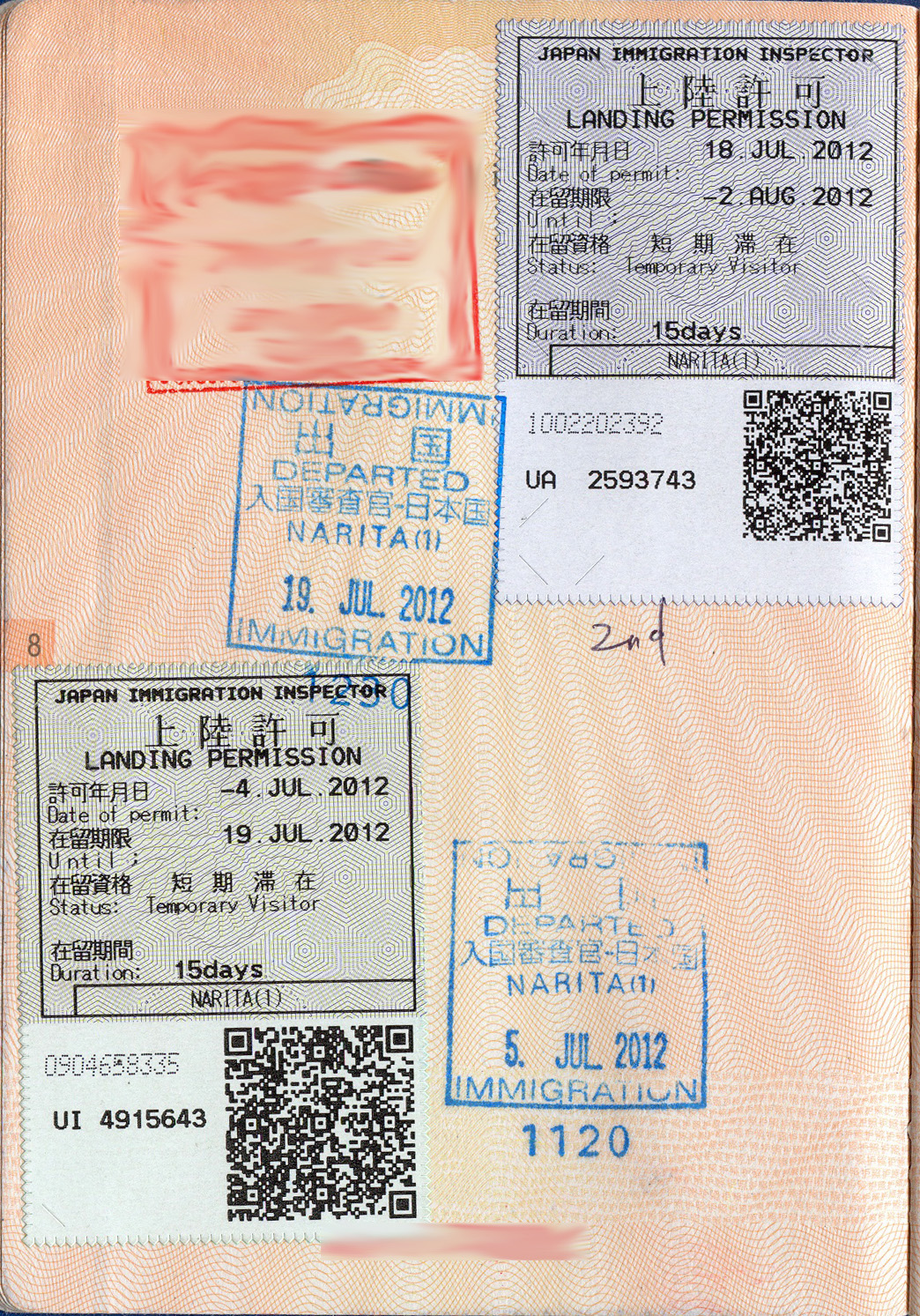
Japanese entry and exit stamps from 2012, showing QR codes, as well as the airport of arrival and departure, Narita International Airport.

Border control officials often place stamps in passports as part of their immigration control or customs procedures. This endorsement can serve many different purposes. In the United Kingdom the immigration stamp in the passport includes the formal "leave to enter" granted on entry to the country to a person who is subject to immigration control. Alternatively, the stamps activate and/or acknowledge the continuing leave conferred by the individual's entry clearance. Other authorities, such as those in Schengen member states, simply stamp a passport with a date stamp that does not indicate any duration and this stamp is taken to mean either that the person is deemed to have permission to remain for 90 days within a 180-day period or an alternative period as shown on their visa, whichever is shorter. In Japan, the passport entry sticker also contains a QR code that allows the immigration official to electronically collect information related to that entry.

Most countries have different stamps for arrivals and departures to make it easier for officers to quickly identify the movements of the person concerned. The colour of the ink or the style of stamp may also provide such information in a few countries, such as colour of the stamp either indicating entry or exit or type of port used to enter or exit. Schengen area entry stamps have square corners and exit stamps have rounded corners, with a stylized symbol of a car, boat, train, or plane at the top right depending on the method of travel.

In many cases passengers on cruise ships do not receive passport stamps because the entire vessel has been cleared into port. It is often possible to get a souvenir stamp, although this requires finding the immigration office by the dock. In many cases officials are used to such requests and will cooperate. Also, some of the smallest European countries will give a stamp on request, either at their border or tourist office charging, at most, a nominal fee.

== See also ==
- Revenue Stamp
