= Cambodian passport =

Travel document

Cambodian passport; លិខិតឆ្លងដែនកម្ពុជា
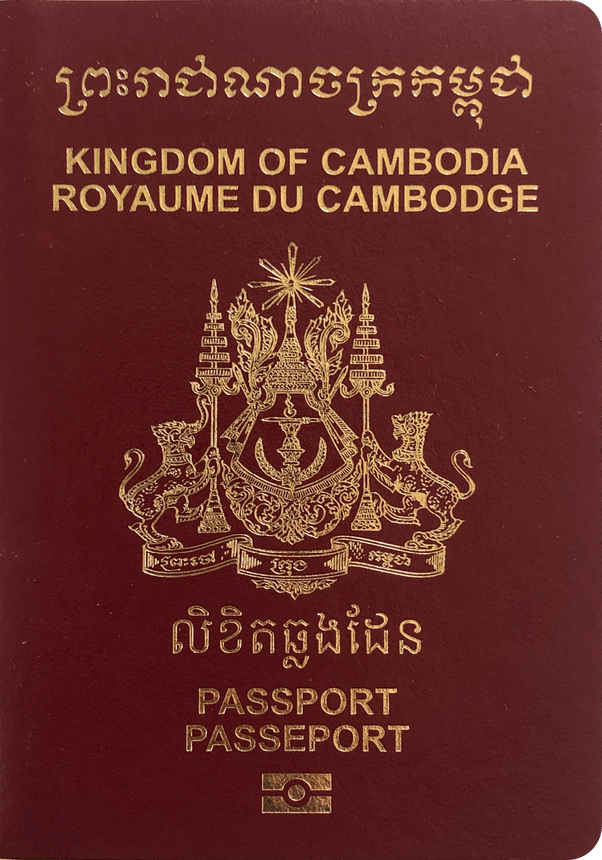
- Cambodian biometric passport
- Type: Passport
- Issued by: Ministry of Interior
- First issued: Before 2014 (non-biometric); 17 July 2014 (biometric passport)
- Purpose: Identification
- Eligibility: Cambodian citizenship (including selected foreigners)
- Expiration: 10 years for individuals aged 6 years and above 5 years for those under 6
- Cost: US$100 (10 years); US$80 (5 years)

The Cambodian passport (Khmer: លិខិតឆ្លងដែនកម្ពុជា) is issued to citizens of Cambodia for international travel.

Since 17 July 2014, the Cambodian government introduced the new biometric passport, which is now valid for 10 years.

== Fees ==
The application fee for a Cambodian passport is the highest among all Asian countries and one of the highest in the world. Since the launch of the new biometric passport in 2014, the application fee has been lowered to US$100 for a 10-year passport, and $80 for a 5-year passport (only issued to children aged 5 and below).

Previously, the machine readable passport cost $135 with a validity of only three years (extendable twice for every two years), and the processing time ranged from 55 days to more than two months. In comparison, a Vietnamese passport with 10-year validity costs only VNĐ100,000 (US$4.32) and the processing time is at least 8 working days. The current processing fee for the 10-year passport, however, has decreased 65 percent compared to the old machine-readable passport.

== Required documents ==
Processing a Cambodian passport requires the applicant to produce 2 other documents as a proof of citizenship as well as residency.

Below are the 2 requirements:

1. Valid Cambodian identity card.
2. Proof of residency (any one of below): a. Family Record Book, or b. Resident Book, or c. Proof of residency letter.

As a side note, the proof of residency letter can be produced by district officers around the applicant's area as long as they are able to provide enough evidence of their residency.

== Physical appearance ==
The Cambodian government began issuing new biometric passports in 2014. The design of the passports has received some changes. The passport has a brown or maroon cover with the Coat of arms of Cambodia on the front center. Above the coat of arms is the inscription "ព្រះរាជាណាចក្រកម្ពុជា" (Khmer) followed by "KINGDOM OF CAMBODIA" (English) and "ROYAUME DU CAMBODGE" (French). And the words "លិខិតឆ្លងដែន" (Khmer) followed by "PASSPORT" (English) and "PASSEPORT" (French) are inscribed below the coat of arms, whereas the international e-passport symbol is inscribed on the bottom of the front cover.

The passport is printed in three languages: Khmer, English and French.

=== Passport message ===
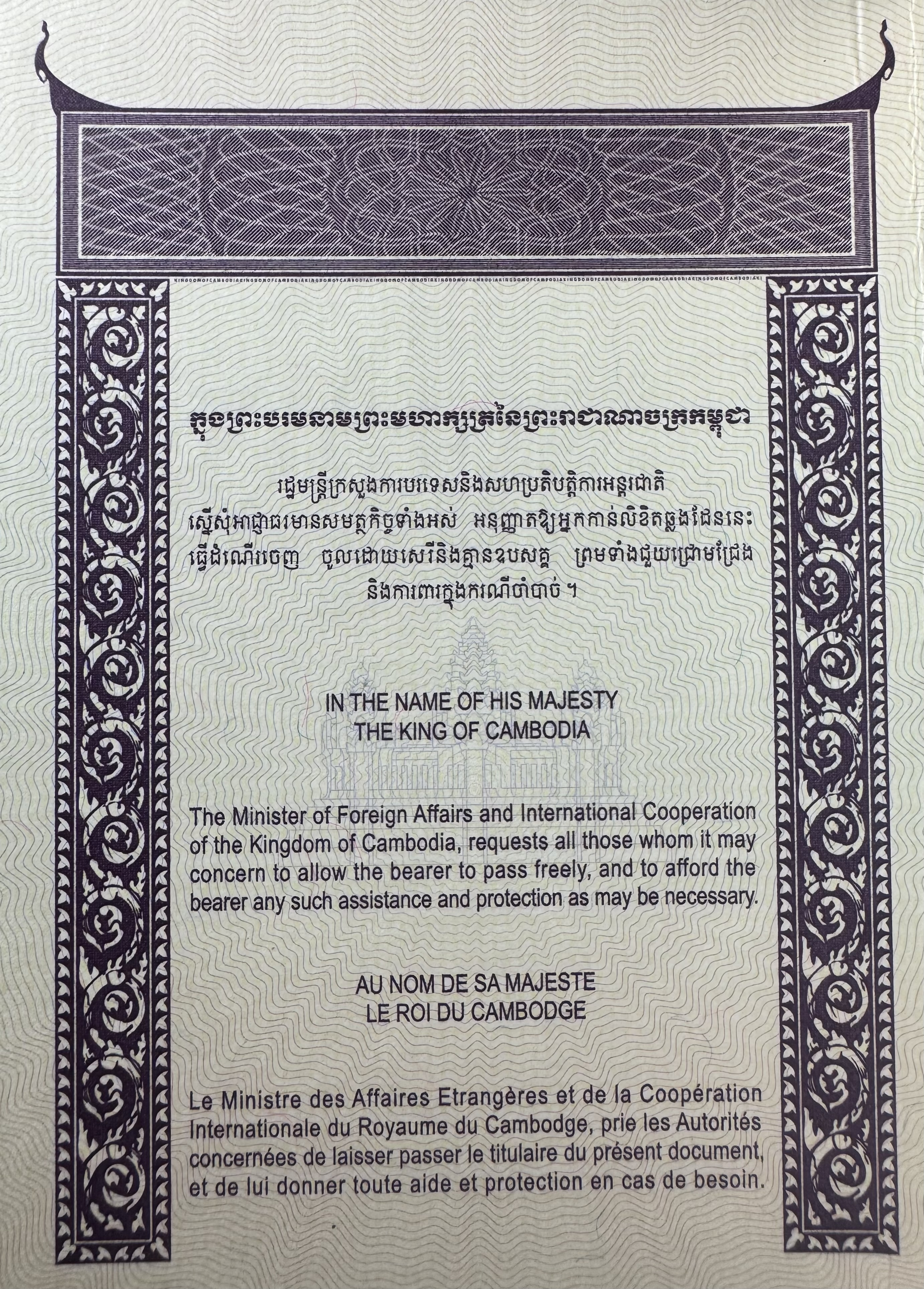
The messages inside the Cambodia passport.

The messages inside the Cambodian passport are written in Khmer, English and French. The message in the passport, nominally from the Cambodian Ministry of Foreign Affairs and International Cooperation, in which states:

In Khmer:

ក្នុងព្រះបរមនាមព្រះមហាក្សត្រនៃព្រះរាជាណាចក្រកម្ពុជា
រដ្ធមន្ត្រីក្រសួងការបរទេសនិងសហប្រតិបត្តិការអន្តរជាតិ ស្នើសុំអជ្ញាធរមានសមត្ថកិច្ចទាំងអស់ អនុញ្ញាតឱ្យអ្នកកាន់លិខិតឆ្លងដែននេះធ្វើដំណើរចេញ ចូលដោយសេរីនិងគ្មានឧបសគ្គ ព្រមទាំងជួយជ្រោមជ្រែង និងការពារក្នុងករណីចាំបាច់។

In English:

IN THE NAME OF HIS MAJESTY THE KING OF CAMBODIA

The Minister of Foreign Affairs and International Cooperation of the Kingdom of Cambodia, requests all those whom it may concern to allow the bearer to pass freely, and to afford the bearer any such assistance and protection as may be necessary.

In French:

AU NOM DE SA MAJESTE LE ROI DU CAMBODGE

Le Ministre des Affaires Etrangères et de la Coopération Internationale du Royaume du Cambodge, prie les Autorités concernées de laisser passer le titulaire du présent document, et de lui donner toute aide et protection en cas de besoin.

=== Identification page ===
- Picture of the passport holder (Width: 40mm, Height: 60mm; Head height (up to the top of the hair): 36mm; Distance from the top of the photo to the top of the hair: 6mm; White background)
- Type ("P" for passport)
- Issuing country code: KHM
- Passport number
- Last name and first name of the passport holder
- Nationality
- Date of birth (DD. MM. YYYY)
- Gender (M for men or F for women)
- Birthplace
- Date of issue (DD. MM. YYYY)
- Expiration date (DD. MM. YYYY)

=== Information page ===
- Name in Khmer
- Profession
- Height
- Distinguishing marks
- Passport's country validity
- Emergency Contact
- Home Address
- Passport holder's signature

== Visa requirements ==
Countries and territories with visa-free entries or visas on arrival for holders of regular Cambodian passports Cambodia Visa not required Visa on arrival eVisa Visa available both on arrival or online Visa required

On 28 September 2019, Cambodian citizens had visa-free or visa on arrival access to 53 countries and territories, ranking the Cambodian passport 88th in the world according to the Visa Restrictions Index.

== See also ==
- Visa requirements for Cambodian citizens
- List of passports

== Gallery ==
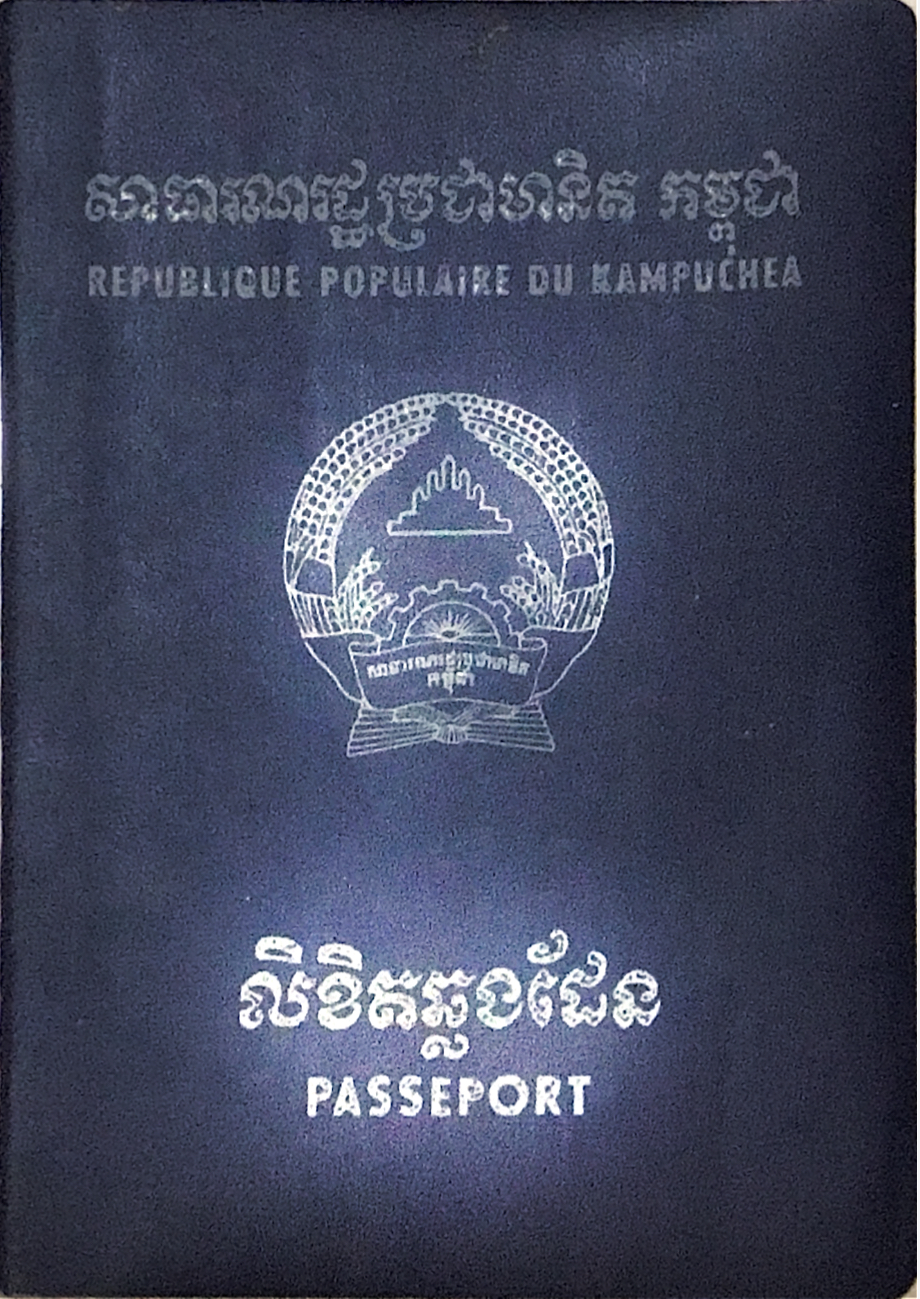
The cover of the Cambodian passport issued in 1980s and early 1990s which used the style of People's Republic of Kampuchea.

The cover of the Cambodian non-biometric passport issued before the 17th of July 2014 for Cambodia.
