= Embassy of Cambodia, Washington, D.C. =

Royal Embassy of Cambodia, Washington, D.C. ស្ថានទូតនៃកម្ពុជា រដ្ឋធានីវ៉ាស៊ីនតោន
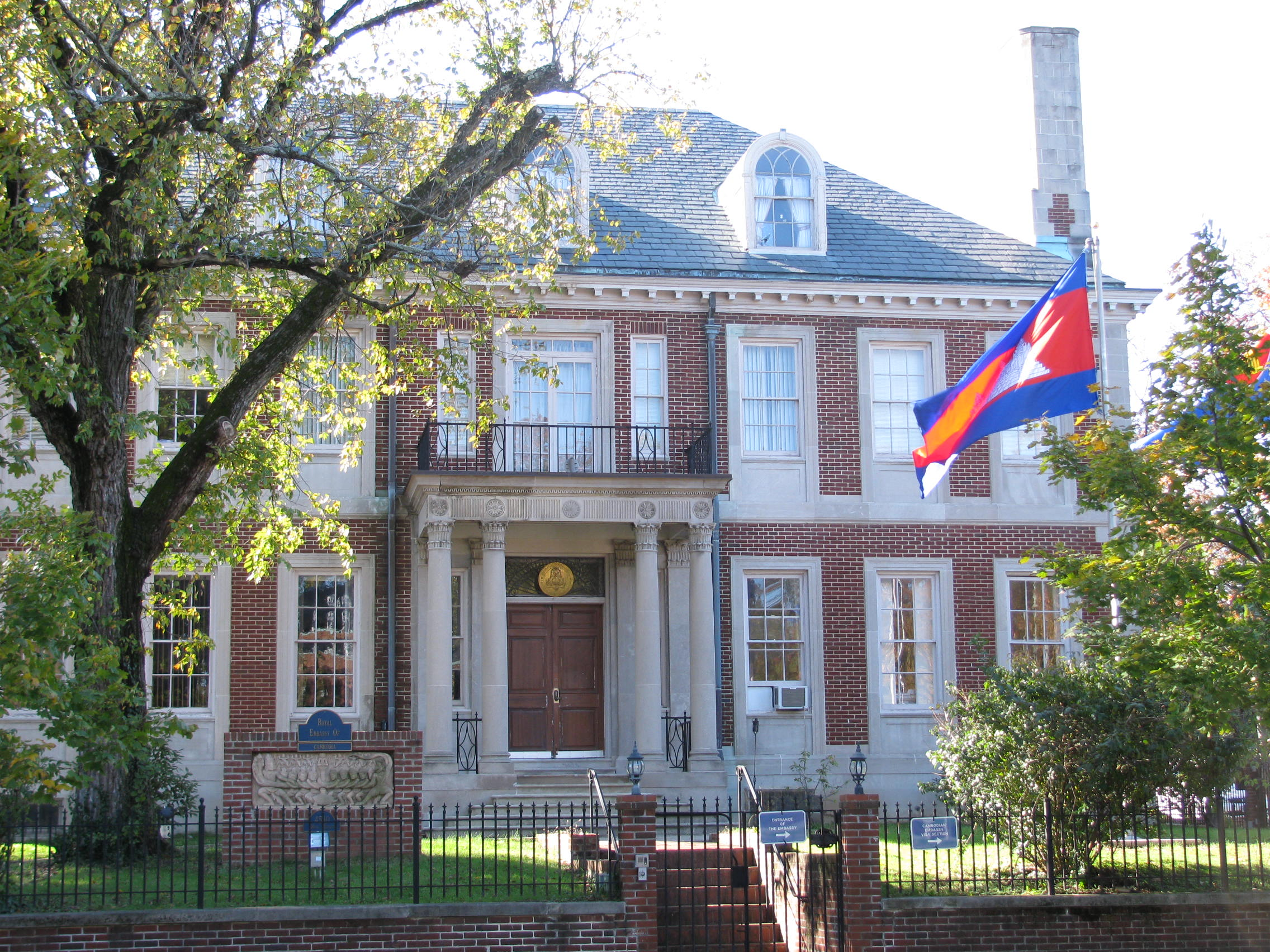
- Location: Washington, DC, U.S.
- Address: 4530 16th Street NW, Washington, DC.
- Coordinates: 38.94592°N 77.03679°W
- Ambassador: H.E. KEO Chhea

The Embassy of Cambodia in Washington, D.C. is the diplomatic mission of the Kingdom of Cambodia to the United States of America. It is located at 4530 16th Street Northwest, Washington, D.C. in the Crestwood neighborhood.

KEO Chhea is the current Cambodian Ambassador to the United States, and was appointed to the role in 2018.

== See also ==
- Cambodia – United States relations
