= Visa policy of Cambodia =

Policy on permits required to enter Cambodia

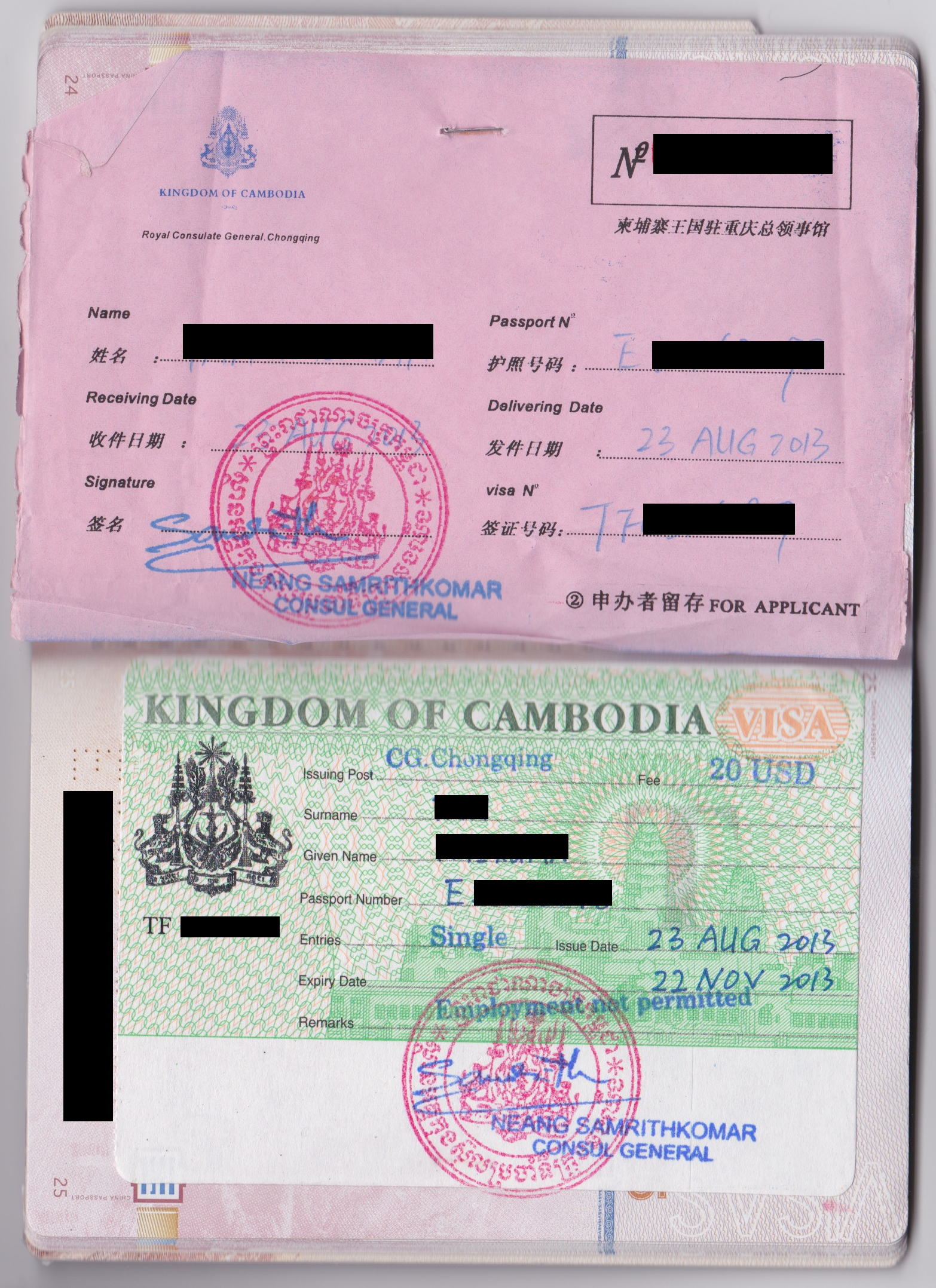
A Cambodian visa along with receipt issued by Royal Cambodian Consulate General in Chongqing to a Chinese citizen

Most visitors to Cambodia must obtain a visa, either a visa on arrival or an e-Visa unless they are citizens from one of the visa-exempt countries.

== Entry requirements ==
All visitors must have a passport valid for at least 6 months and containing at least 1 empty page. All foreign citizens must hold a return or onward ticket.

Starting January 2025, all visitors flying to Cambodia are required to submit the Cambodia e-Arrival Card within seven days before their arrival.

== Visa policy map ==
Visa policy of Cambodia Cambodia Visa not required (60 days) Visa not required (30 days) Visa not required (15 days) Visa not required (14 days) Visa on arrival / eVisa (30 days)

== Visa exemption ==
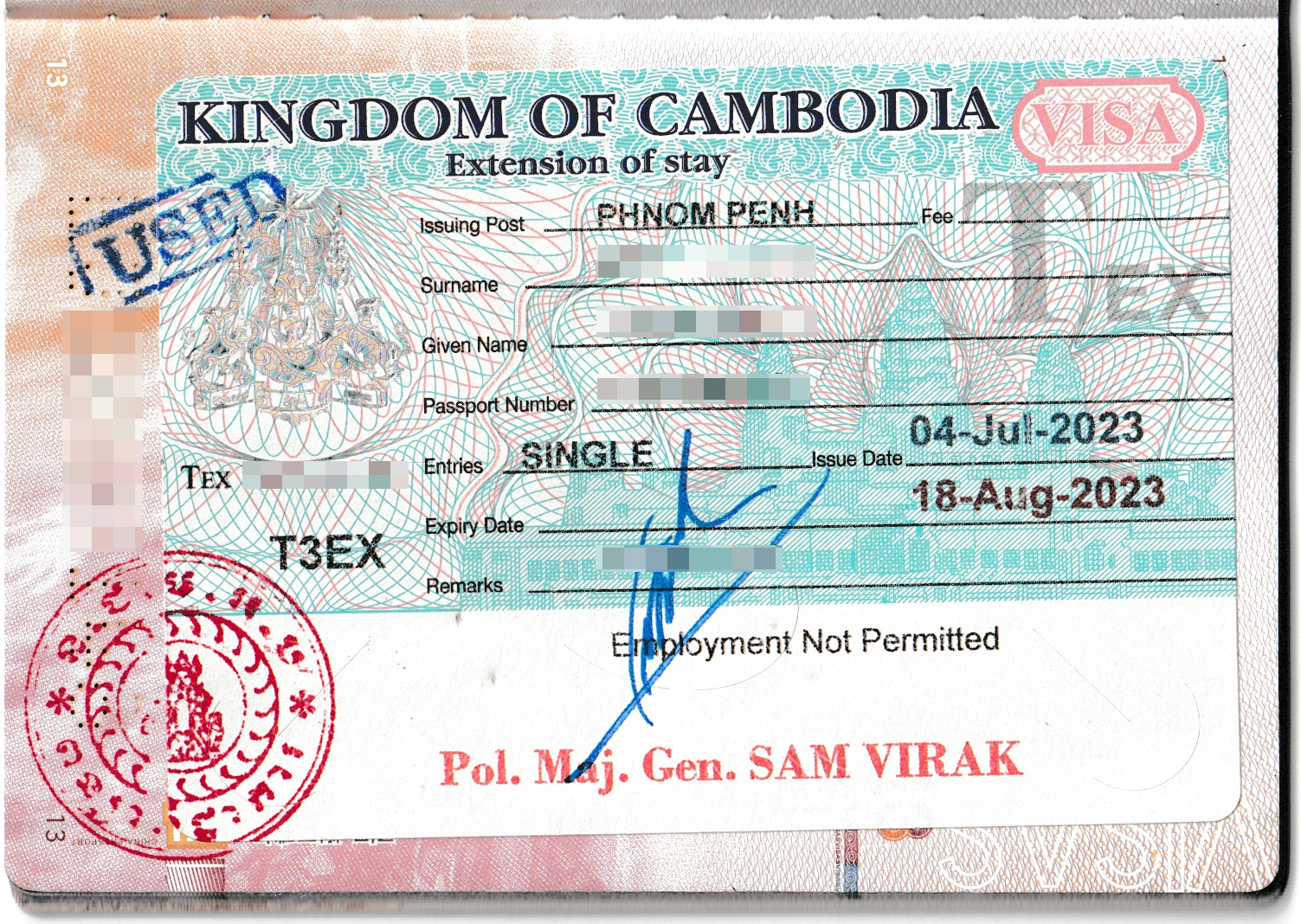
A Cambodia visa extension sticker issued to a Chinese citizen in Phnom Penh in 2023

=== Ordinary passports ===
According to the Ministry of Foreign Affairs and International Cooperation of Cambodia, holders of ordinary passports of the following countries may enter Cambodia without a visa for stays up to the duration listed below:

60 days

- Thailand (Note: Citizens of Thailand are permitted to stay in Cambodia without a visa for up to 60 days when entering by air, while the permitted stay is limited to 7 days when entering through a land border crossing.)

30 days

- Indonesia
- Laos
- Malaysia
- Maldives
- Philippines
- Singapore
- Vietnam

15 days

- Seychelles

14 days

- Brunei
- Myanmar

=== Non-ordinary passports ===
Holders of diplomatic, official, service or special passports of the following countries may enter Cambodia without a visa for stays up to the duration listed below:

Indefinite period

- Cuba^{D S}

90 days

- Azerbaijan^{D}
- Belarus^{D S}
- Bulgaria^{D S}
- Georgia^{D S}
- Hungary^{D S}
- Japan^{D S}
- Poland^{D}
- Russia^{D S}

60 days

- India^{D S}
- South Korea^{D S}

30 days

- ASEAN member states^{D O S} (except Brunei, Indonesia and Timor-Leste)

- Bangladesh^{D S}
- Brazil^{D S}
- China^{D S}
- Colombia^{D S}
- Ecuador^{D S}
- Iran^{D S}
- Kuwait^{D S Sp}
- Maldives^{D S}
- Mongolia^{D S}
- Morocco^{D S}
- Nepal^{D S}
- North Korea^{D O}
- Peru^{D S}
- Romania^{D S}
- Serbia^{D S}
- Sri Lanka^{D S}
- Timor-Leste^{D S}
- Turkey^{D S Sp}
- Ukraine^{D O S}
- Uruguay^{D S}

15 days

- Seychelles^{D S}

14 days

- Brunei^{D O S}
- Indonesia^{D O S}

_{D - Diplomatic passports}
_{O - Official passports}
_{S - Service passports}
_{Sp - Special passports}

Date of visa changes
- 24 August 1980: Cuba (diplomatic and service passports)
- 25 November 1980: Bulgaria (diplomatic and service passports)
- 18 February 1981: Hungary (diplomatic and service passports)
- 17 March 1988: Russia (diplomatic and service passports)
- 26 May 1997: Malaysia
- 1 June 2000: Philippines (as 21 days)
- 9 May 2002: India (diplomatic and service passports)
- 1 July 2004: Laos
- 1 January 2006: Singapore
- 14 September 2006: China (diplomatic and service passports)
- 21 December 2006: South Korea (diplomatic and service passports)
- 5 December 2008: Vietnam
- 10 March 2010: Peru (diplomatic and service passports)
- 10 September 2010: Iran (diplomatic and service passports)
- 6 December 2010: Thailand
- 24 June 2011: Brazil (diplomatic and service passports)
- 22 September 2011: Indonesia
- 26 November 2011: Brunei
- 27 September 2012: Mongolia (diplomatic and service passports)
- 8 October 2012: Seychelles
- 1 July 2013: Ecuador (diplomatic and service passports)
- 11 December 2013: Japan (diplomatic and service passports)
- 12 January 2014: Myanmar
- 21 April 2014: Bangladesh (diplomatic and service passports)
- 25 May 2014: Uruguay (diplomatic and service passports)
- 7 February 2015: Belarus (diplomatic and service passports)
- 23 August 2015: Turkey (diplomatic, service and special passports)
- 11 July 2016: Kuwait (diplomatic, service and special passports)
- 21 October 2017: Colombia (diplomatic and service passports)
- 24 April 2019: Morocco (diplomatic and service passports)
- 9 June 2019: Nepal (diplomatic and service passports)
- 13 June 2019: Philippines (extension to 30 days)
- 25 July 2021: Romania (diplomatic and service passports)
- 25 February 2022: Serbia (diplomatic and service passports)
- 1 July 2022: Georgia (diplomatic and service passports)
- 5 September 2022: Timor-Leste (diplomatic and service passports)
- 10 December 2022: Azerbaijan (diplomatic passports)
- 24 December 2022: Sri Lanka (diplomatic and service passports)
- 4 May 2023: Maldives
- 23 July 2023: Poland (diplomatic passports)
- 17 February 2025: Ukraine ( diplomatic and official passports)

Cancelled:

- Unknown: Hong Kong

== Visa on arrival / Electronic visa (e-Visa) ==
eVisa Kingdom of Cambodia

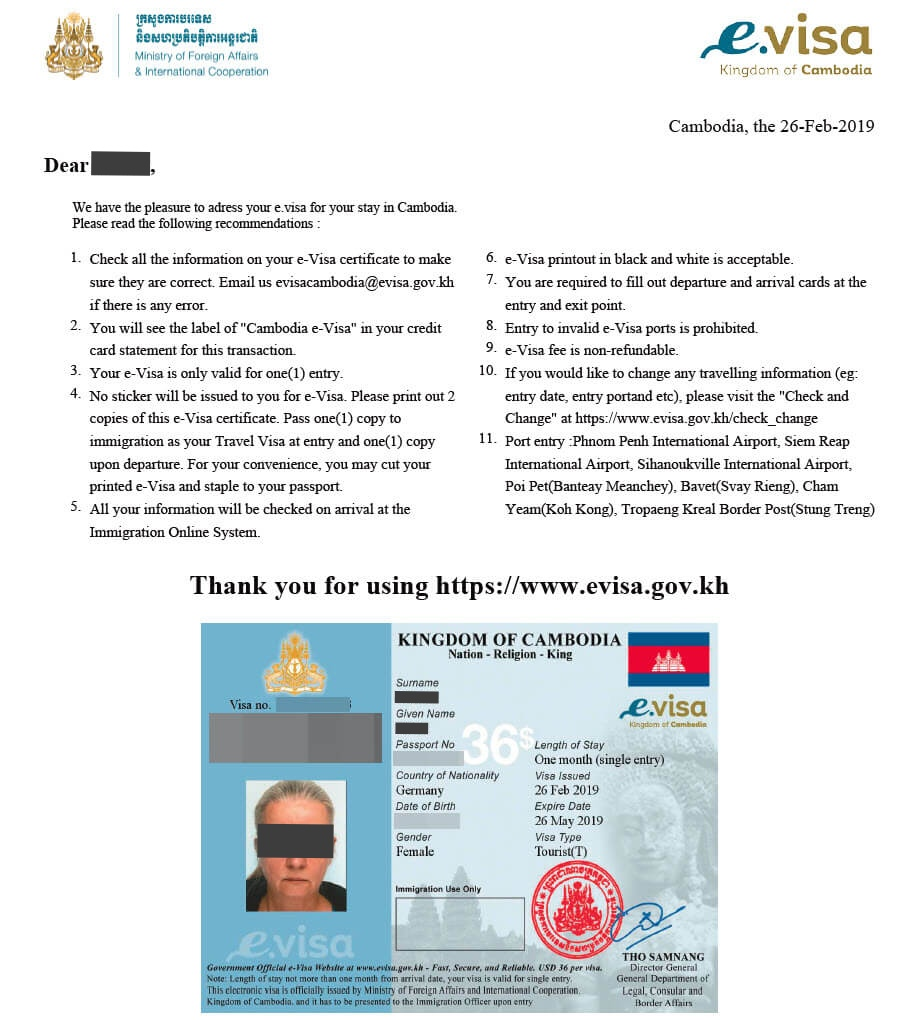
- Approval letter with Cambodian eVisa attached
- Owner: Ministry of Foreign Affairs and International Cooperation
- Website: evisa.gov.kh

External image
- Interactive map Map of entry points with Visa on Arrival facility

Citizens of any country may obtain a visa on arrival or electronic visa.

Visa on arrival is good for tourism (30 USD) or business purposes (35 USD), for a maximum stay of 30 days. Extensions are possible.

Cambodia e-Visa or Electronic Visa has been introduced by Ministry of Foreign Affairs and International Cooperation in April 2006 to promote the Cambodia tourism industry.

Currently, citizens of any country may also apply for an e-Visa online for 30 USD prior to arriving in Cambodia.

The e-Visa allows for a single entry and a maximum stay of 30 days for tourism purposes.

Holders of e-Visa may enter via the following entry points:

- Airports:
  - Techo International Airport
  - Siem Reap–Angkor International Airport
  - Sihanoukville International Airport
- Land Checkpoints:
  - Bavet (Svay Rieng Province) (from Vietnam)
  - Trapeang Kriel (Stung Treng Province) (from Laos)

The following ports are temporarily closed for e-Visa entry:

- Cham Yeam (Koh Kong Province) (from Thailand)
- Poipet (Banteay Meanchey Province) (from Thailand)
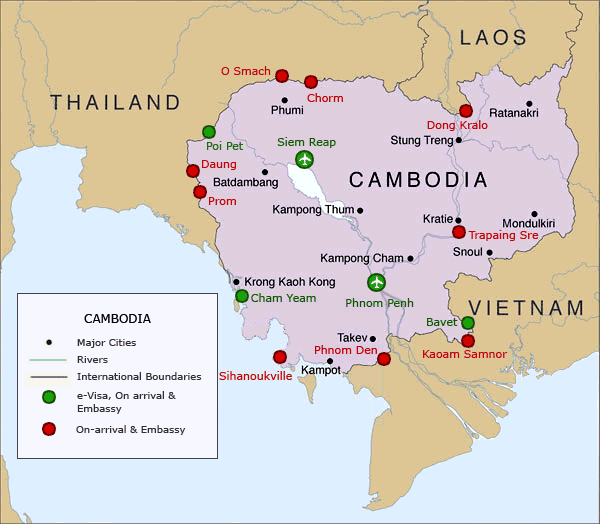
Map of Cambodian immigration checkpoints which accept e-visa or visa on arrival

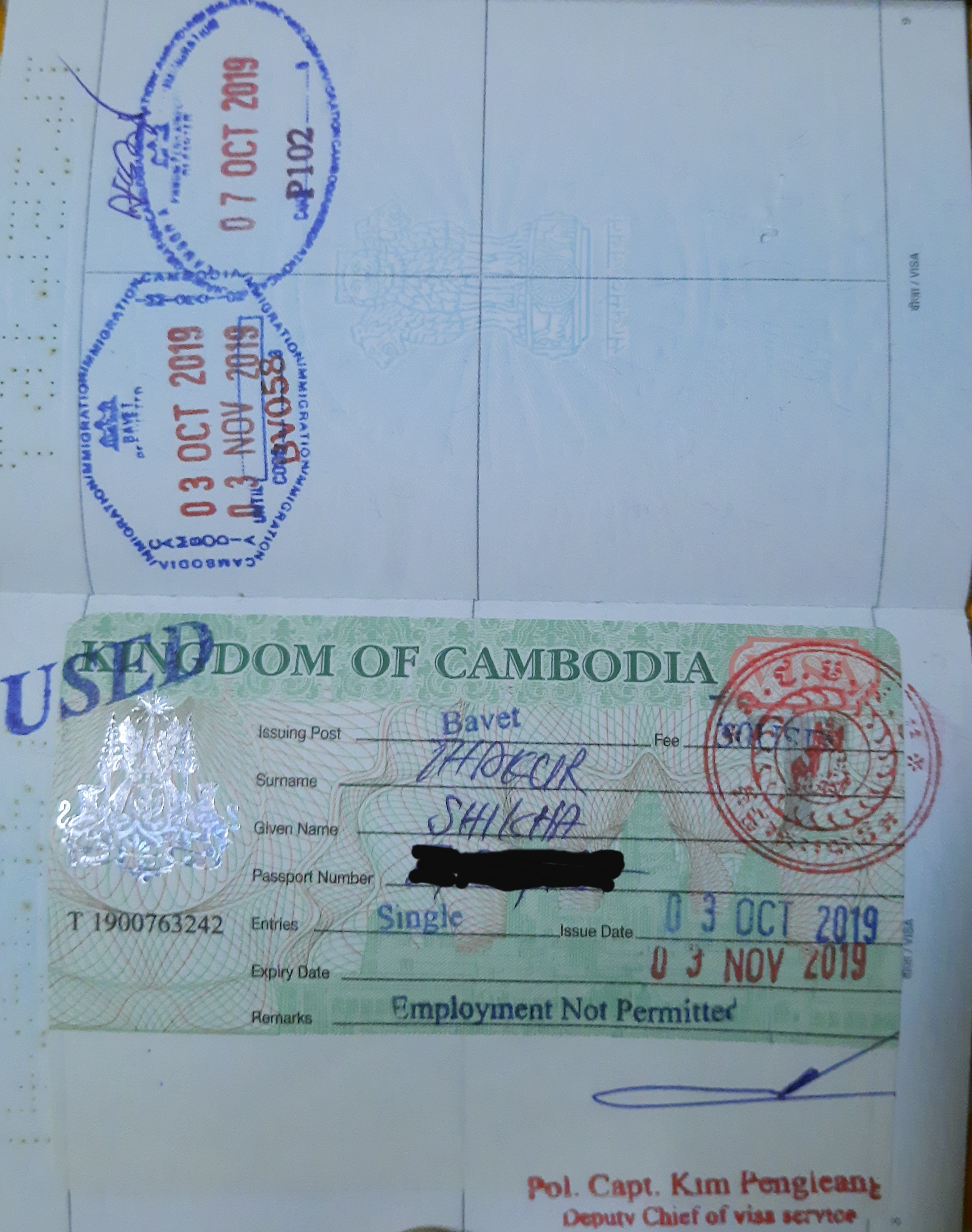
Cambodian visa on Arrival in Indian Passport at Bavet Municipality

== Transit ==
Transit passengers who are leaving on the same arrival aircraft do not need a visa when transiting through Phnom Penh International Airport.

== Admission restrictions ==
Day trips (arriving and departing on the same day) are not permitted, except when arriving and departing via Phnom Penh International Airport.

== Visitor statistics ==
Most visitors arriving in Cambodia were from the following countries of nationality:

Country	2017	2016	2015	2014	2013	2012	2011	2010
ASEAN	2,161,254	2,121,220						
China	1,210,782	830,003	694,712	560,335	463,123	333,894	247,197	177,636
Vietnam	835,355	959,663	987,792	905,801	854,104	763,136	614,090	514,289
Laos	502,219	369,335	405,359	460,191	414,531	254,022	128,525	92,276
Thailand	394,934	398,081	349,908	279,457	221,259	201,422	116,758	149,108
South Korea	345,081	357,194	395,259	424,424	435,009	411,491	342,810	289,702
United States	256,544	238,658	217,510	191,366	184,964	173,076	153,953	146,005
Japan	203,373	191,577	193,330	215,788	206,932	179,327	161,804	151,795
Malaysia	179,316	152,843	149,389	144,437	130,704	116,764	102,929	89,952
United Kingdom	171,162	159,489	154,265	133,306	123,919	110,182	104,052	103,067
France	166,356	150,294	145,724	141,052	131,486	121,175	117,408	113,285
Australia	143,852	146,806	134,748	134,167	132,028	117,729	105,010	93,598
Taiwan	121,023	104,765	109,727	97,528	96,992	92,811	98,363	91,229
Germany	108,784	94,040	84,143	81,565	72,537	63,398	62,864	
Philippines	98,499	108,032	84,677	93,475	118,999	97,487	70,718	56,156
Singapore	81,063	70,556	67,669	65,855	57,808	53,184	47,594	45,079
Canada	69,077	60,715	56,834	52,264	50,867	47,829	42,462	38,718
Russia	65,275	53,164	55,500	108,601	131,675	99,750	67,747	34,170
Indonesia	49,878	48,771	43,147	35,655	28,199	22,544	15,817	12,636
Total	5,602,157	5,011,712	4,775,231	4,502,775	4,210,165	3,584,307	2,881,862	2,508,289

== See also ==
- Visa requirements for Cambodian citizens
- Cambodian passport
