= Tourism in Cambodia =

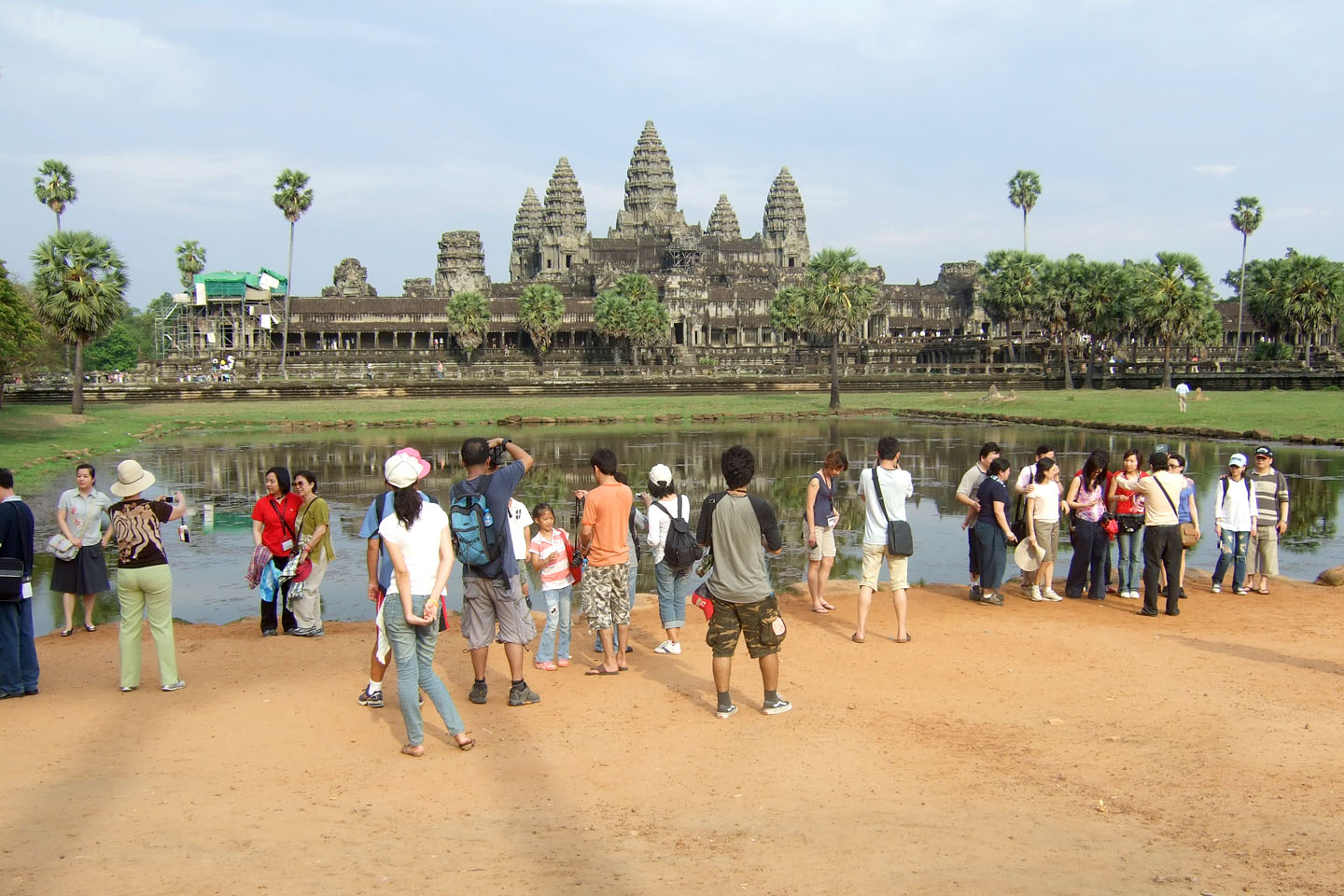
Every year nearly 2.6 million tourists visit Angkor Wat in Siem Reap, Cambodia.

The tourism industry in Cambodia is one of the most important sectors in the country's economy. In 2013, tourism arrivals increased by 17.5 percent year on year, with business travelers increasing 47 percent.

== Statistics ==
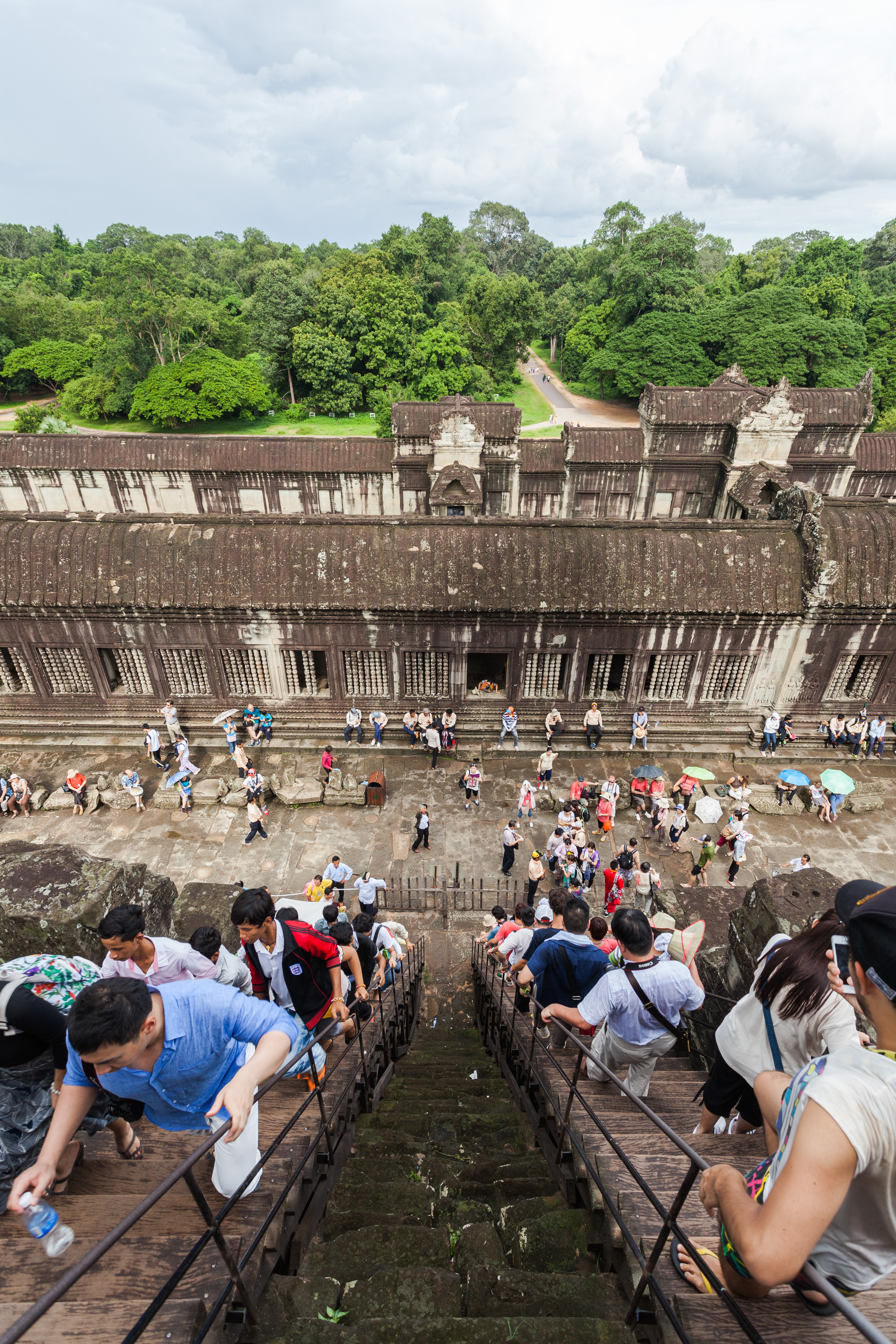
Tourists at Angkor Wat.

| Year | Tourism arrivals | Change | References |
|---|---|---|---|
| 2024 | 6,700,125 | ▲22.9% | |
| 2023 | 5,453,231 | ▲139.5% | |
| 2022 | 2,276,626 | | |
| 2021 | 196,495 | ▼85.0% | |
| 2020 | 1,306,143 | ▼80.2% | |
| 2019 | 6,610,592 | ▲6.6% | |
| 2018 | 6,201,077 | ▲10.7% | |
| 2017 | 5,602,157 | ▲11.7% | |
| 2016 | 5,011,712 | ▲4.95% | |
| 2015 | 4,775,231 | ▲6.1% | |
| 2014 | 4,502,775 | ▲7.0% | |
| 2013 | 4,210,165 | ▲17.5% | |
| 2012 | 3,584,307 | ▲24.4% | |
| 2011 | 2,881,862 | ▲14.9% | |
| 2010 | 2,508,289 | ▲16.0% | |
| 2009 | 2,161,577 | ▲1.7% | |
| 2008 | 2,125,465 | ▲1.5% | |
| 2007 | 2,015,128 | ▲18.5% | |
| 2006 | 1,700,041 | ▲19.6% | |
| 2005 | 1,421,615 | ▲34.7% | |
| 2004 | 1,055,202 | ▲50.5% | |

Ranking of international visitor arrivals

| Country or territory | 2024 | 2018 | 2017 | 2016 | 2015 | 2014 | 2013 | 2012 | 2011 |
|---|---|---|---|---|---|---|---|---|---|
| ASEAN | 4,235,631 | 2,067,504 | 2,161,254 | 2,121,220 | 2,097,758 | 1,918,130 | 1,831,507 | 1,514,267 | 1,101,111 |
| China | 848,952 | 2,024,443 | 1,210,782 | 830,003 | 694,712 | 560,335 | 463,123 | 333,894 | 247,197 |
| Vietnam* | 1,340,587 | 800,128 | 835,355 | 959,663 | 987,792 | 905,801 | 854,104 | 763,136 | 614,090 |
| Laos* | 334,448 | 426,180 | 502,219 | 369,335 | 405,359 | 460,191 | 414,531 | 254,022 | 128,525 |
| Thailand* | 2,146,674 | 382,317 | 394,934 | 398,081 | 349,908 | 279,457 | 221,259 | 201,422 | 116,758 |
| South Korea | 192,305 | 301,770 | 345,081 | 357,194 | 395,259 | 424,424 | 435,009 | 411,491 | 342,810 |
| United States | 214,529 | 250,813 | 256,544 | 238,658 | 217,510 | 191,366 | 184,964 | 173,076 | 153,953 |
| Japan | 112,718 | 210,471 | 203,373 | 191,577 | 193,330 | 215,788 | 206,932 | 179,327 | 161,804 |
| Malaysia* | 94,260 | 201,116 | 179,316 | 152,843 | 149,389 | 144,437 | 130,704 | 116,764 | 102,929 |
| France | 131,738 | 170,844 | 166,356 | 150,294 | 145,724 | 141,052 | 131,486 | 121,175 | 117,408 |
| United Kingdom | 115,148 | 162,395 | 171,162 | 159,489 | 154,265 | 133,306 | 123,919 | 110,182 | 104,052 |
| Taiwan | 84,329 | 134,430 | 121,023 | 104,765 | 109,727 | 97,528 | 96,992 | 92,811 | 98,363 |
| Australia | 104,489 | 127,430 | 143,852 | 146,806 | 134,748 | 134,167 | 132,028 | 117,729 | 105,010 |
| Germany | 74,861 | 98,976 | 118,265 | 108,784 | 94,040 | 84,143 | 81,565 | 72,537 | 63,398 |
| Philippines* | 69,142 | 98,499 | 108,032 | 84,677 | 93,475 | 118,999 | 97,487 | 70,718 | |
| Singapore* | 45,895 | 86,251 | 81,063 | 70,556 | 67,669 | 65,855 | 57,808 | 53,184 | 47,594 |
| India | 77,632 | 65,882 | 59,571 | 46,131 | 36,671 | 28,529 | 23,610 | 18,999 | 15,240 |
| Russia | 71,901 | 64,726 | 65,275 | 53,164 | 55,500 | 108,601 | 131,675 | 99,750 | 67,747 |
| Canada | 43,239 | 61,551 | 69,077 | 60,715 | 56,834 | 52,264 | 50,867 | 47,829 | 42,462 |

* Country in ASEAN

== Major attractions ==
=== World Heritage Sites ===
- Angkor
- Preah Vihear
- Sambor Prei Kuk
- Koh Ker

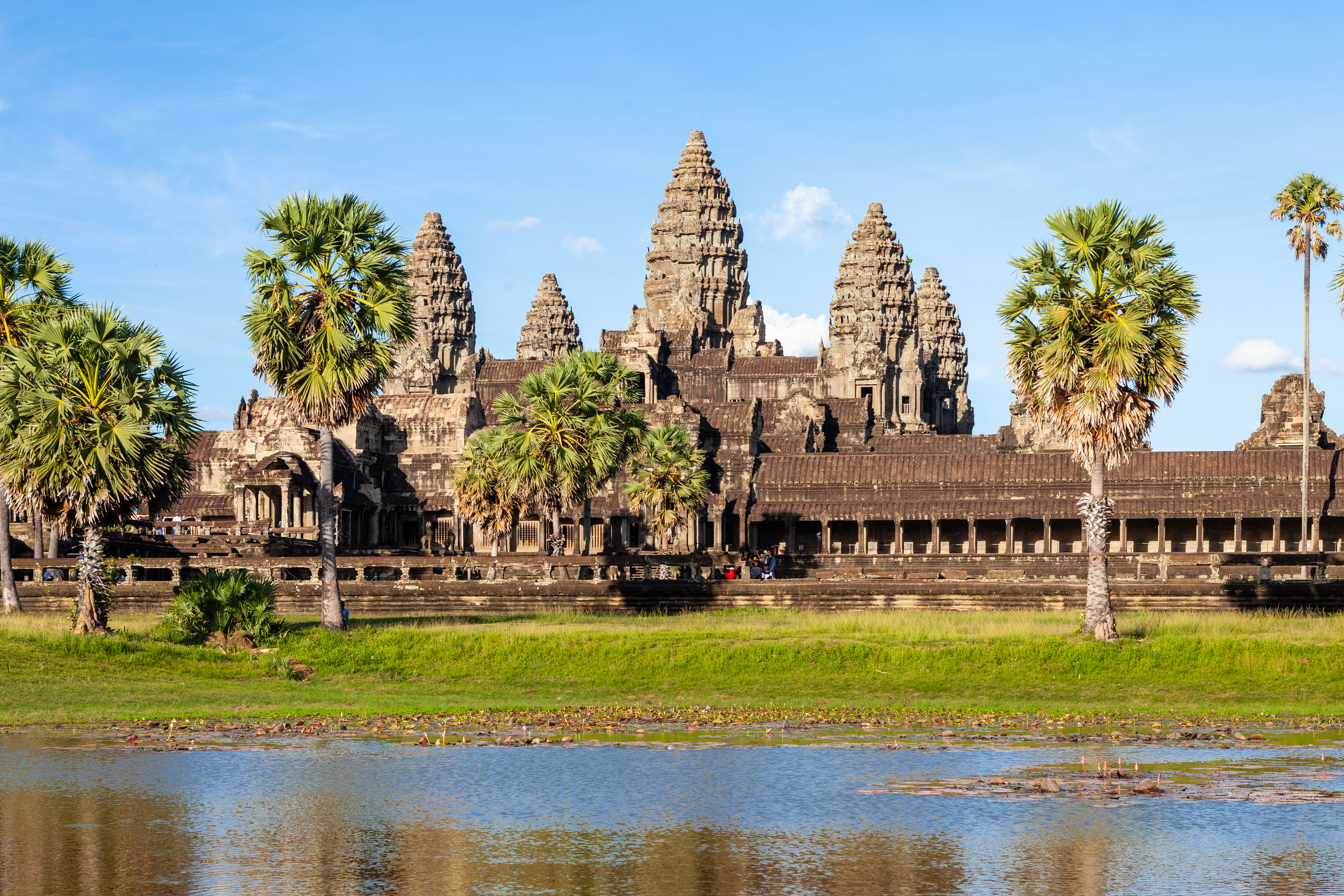
Angkor Wat

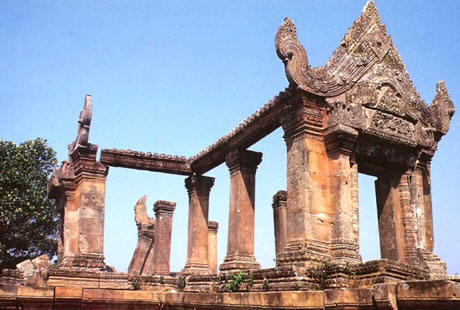
Preah Vihear

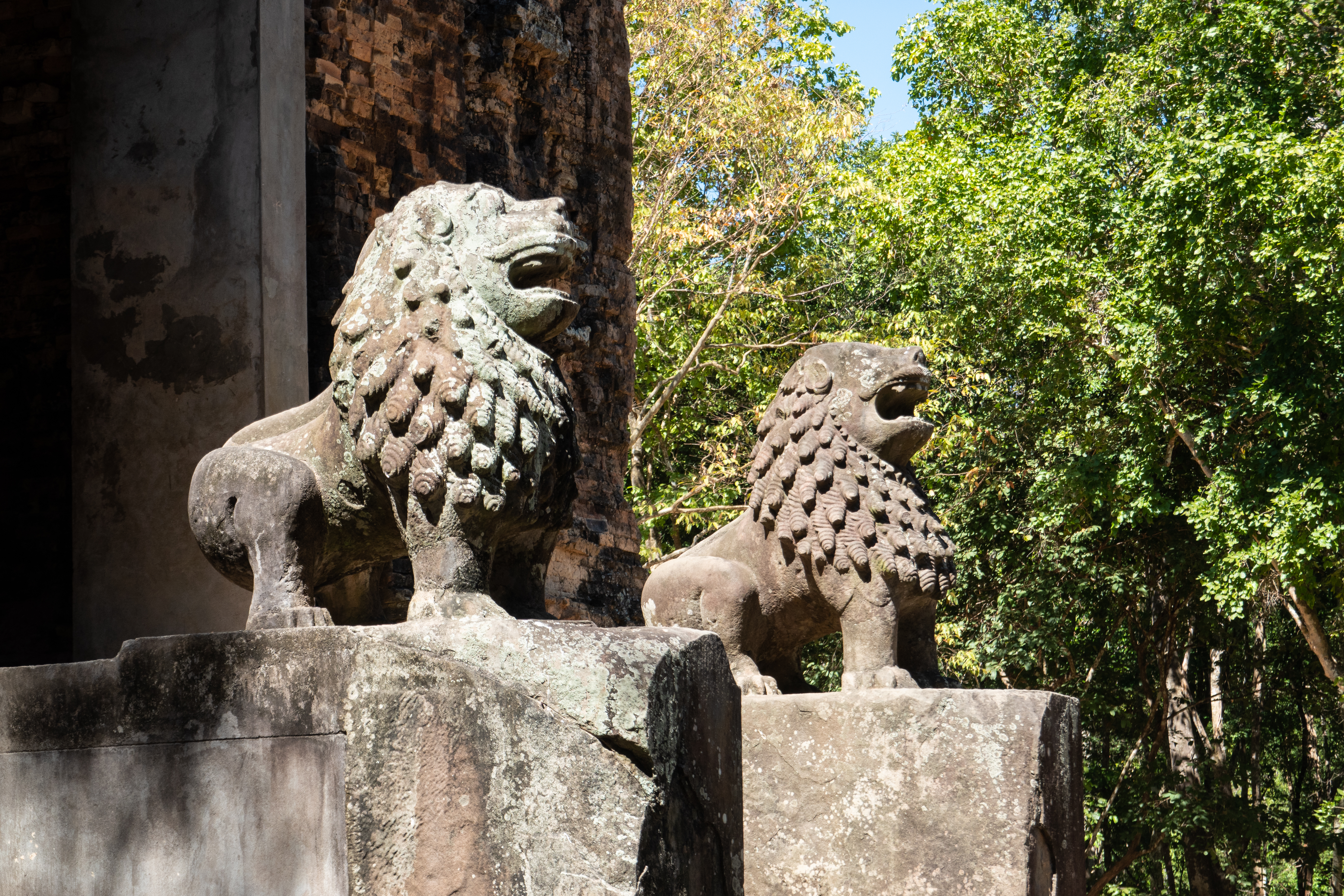
Sambor Prei Kuk

=== Museums ===
- Angkor National Museum
- Cambodian Cultural Village
- National Museum of Cambodia
- Battambang Provincial Museum
- Tuol Sleng Genocide Museum

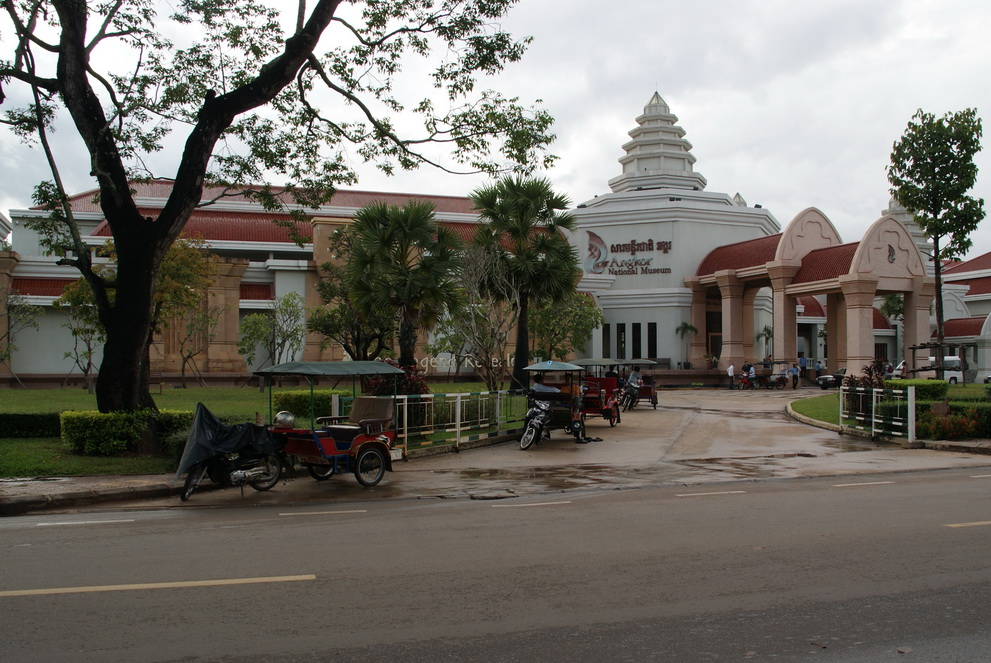
Angkor National Museum

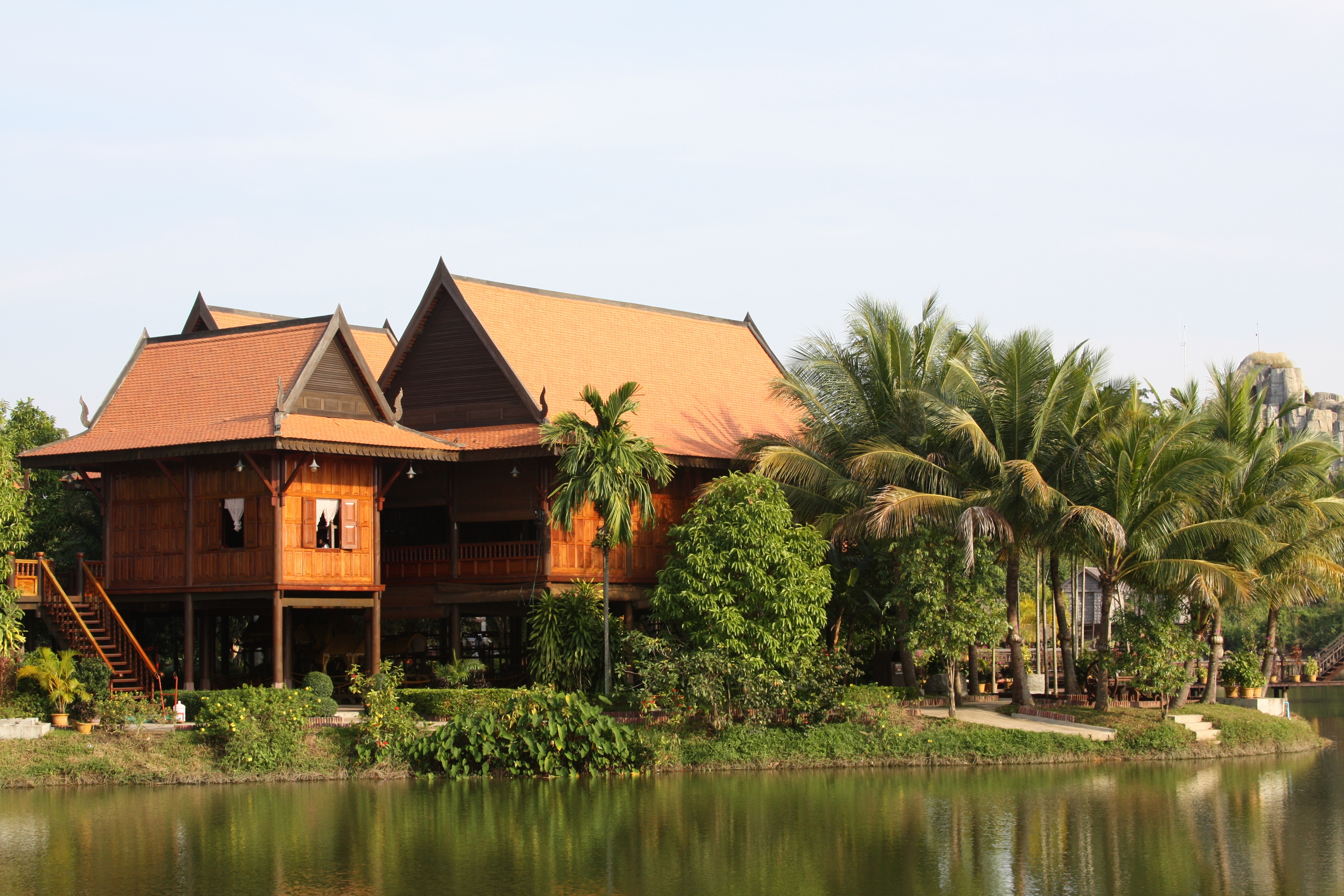
Cambodian Cultural Village

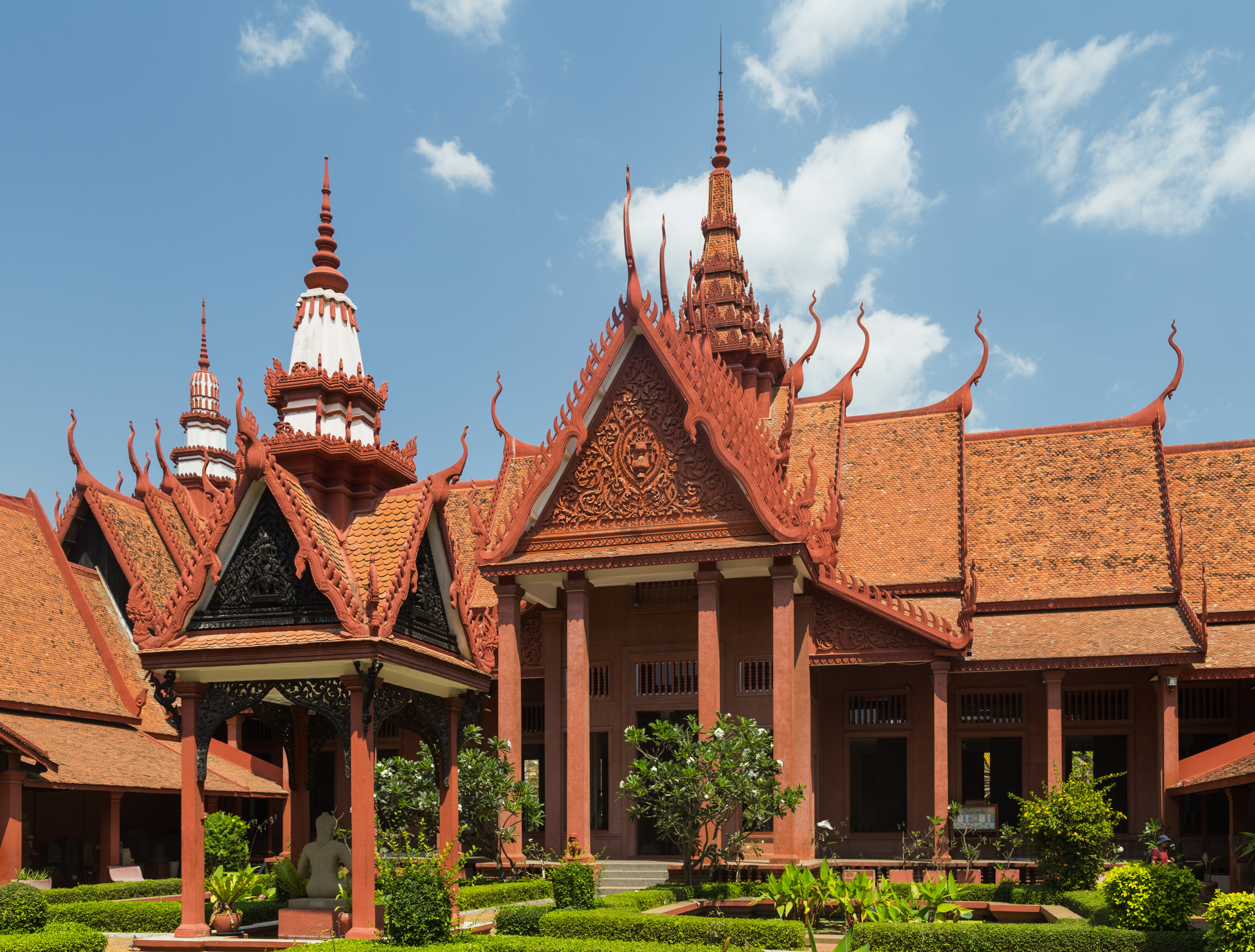
National Museum, Phnom Penh

=== Natural areas ===
- Bou Sra Waterfall
- Lake Yeak Laom
- Phnom Kulen
- Phnom Santuk
- Tonle Sap

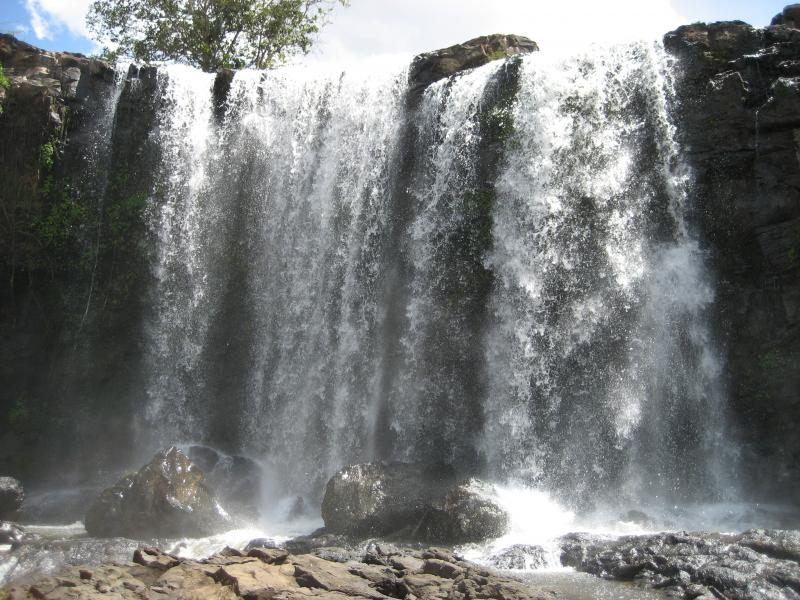
Bou Sra Waterfall

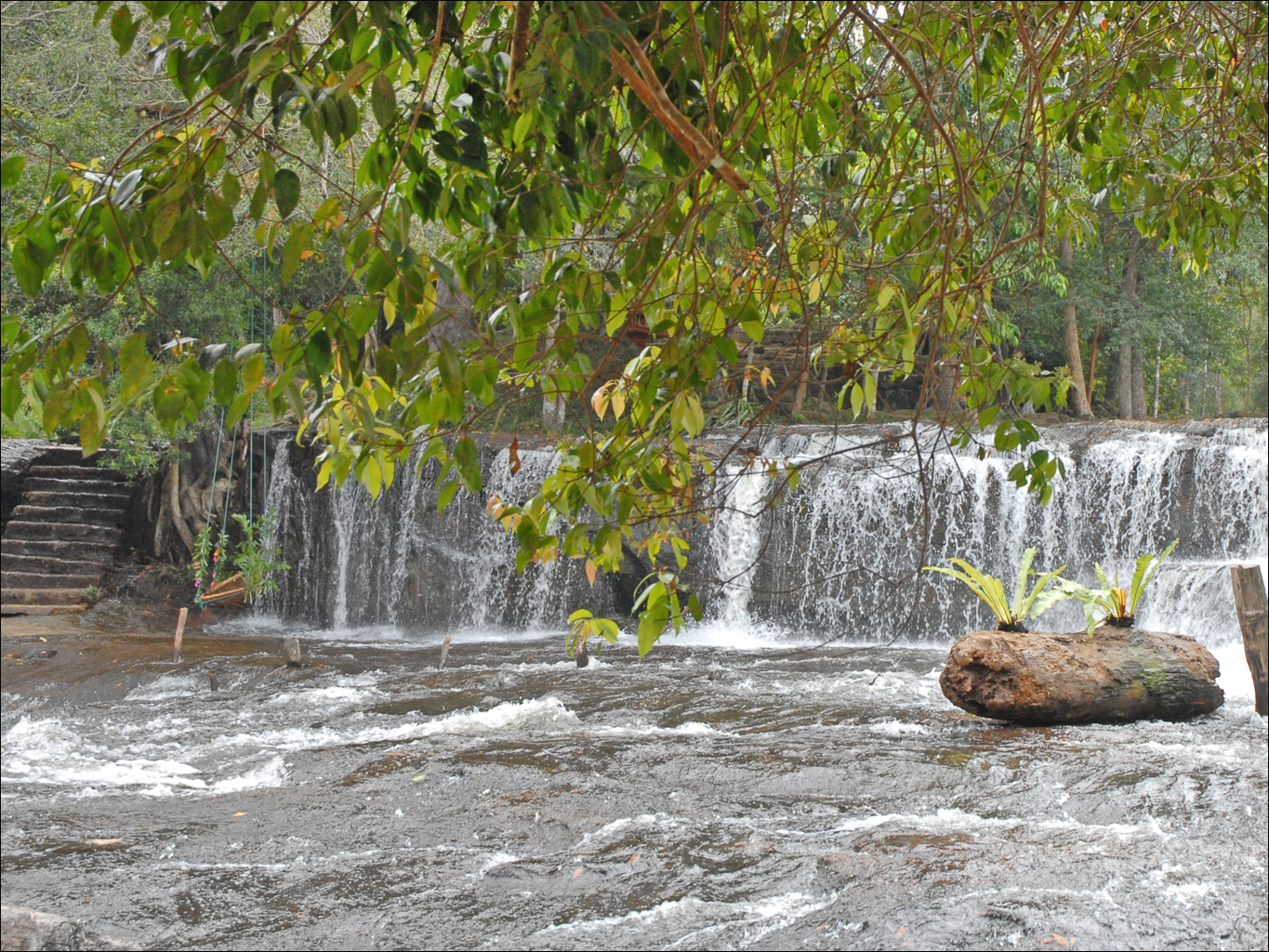
Phnom Kulen

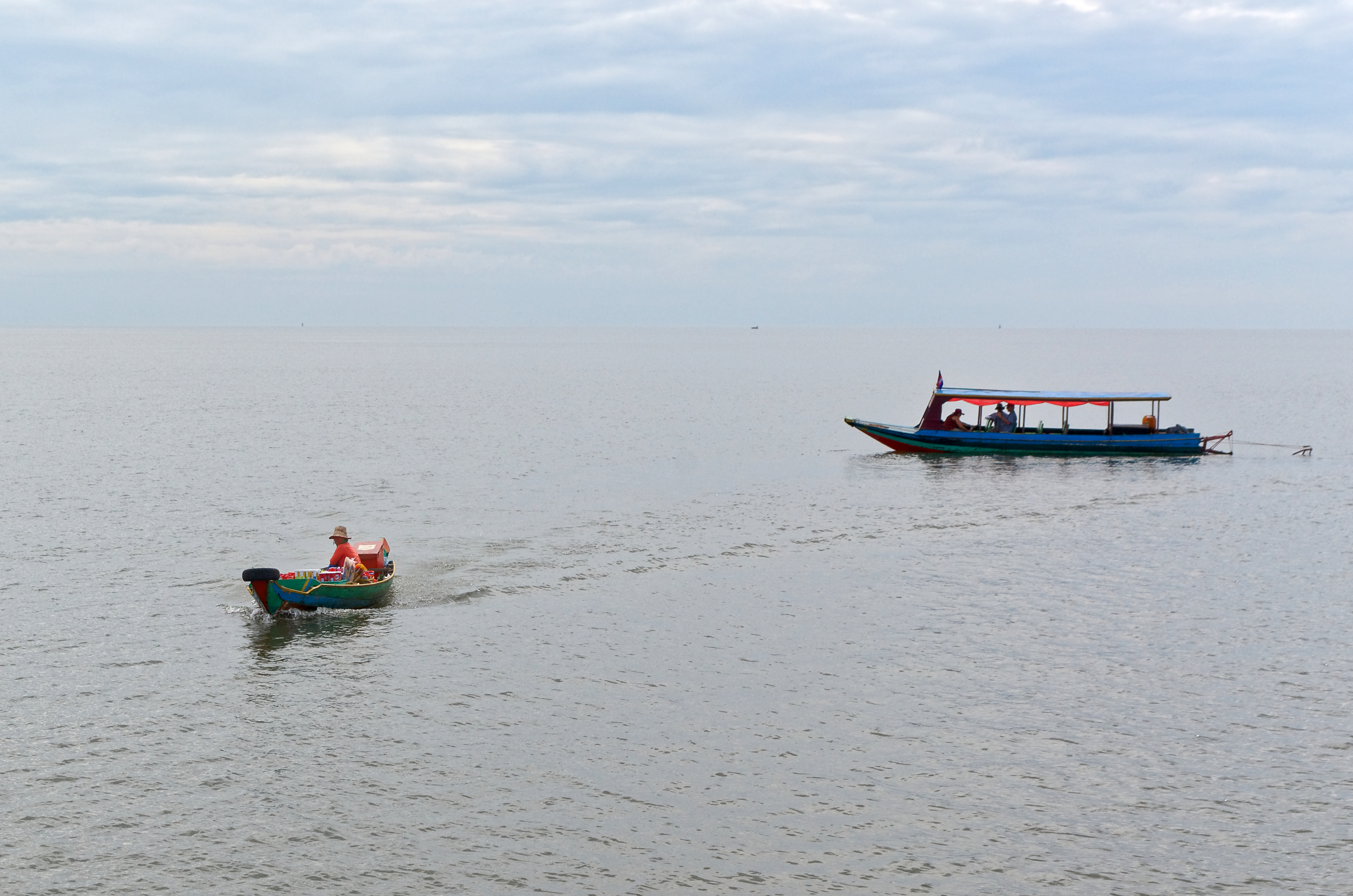
Tonle Sap

=== National parks ===
- Botum Sakor National Park
- Kep National Park
- Kirirom National Park
- Koh Rong Marine National Park
- Phnom Kulen National Park
- Preah Monivong National Park
- Prey Lang Wildlife Sanctuary
- Ream National Park
- Virachey National Park
- Southern Cardamom National Park

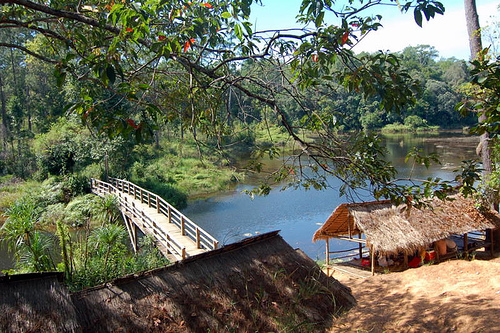
Kirirom National Park

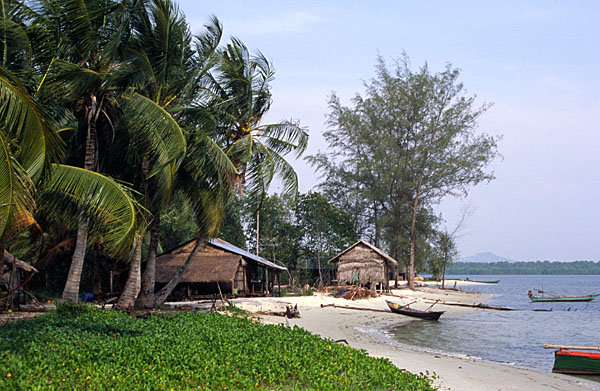
Ream National Park

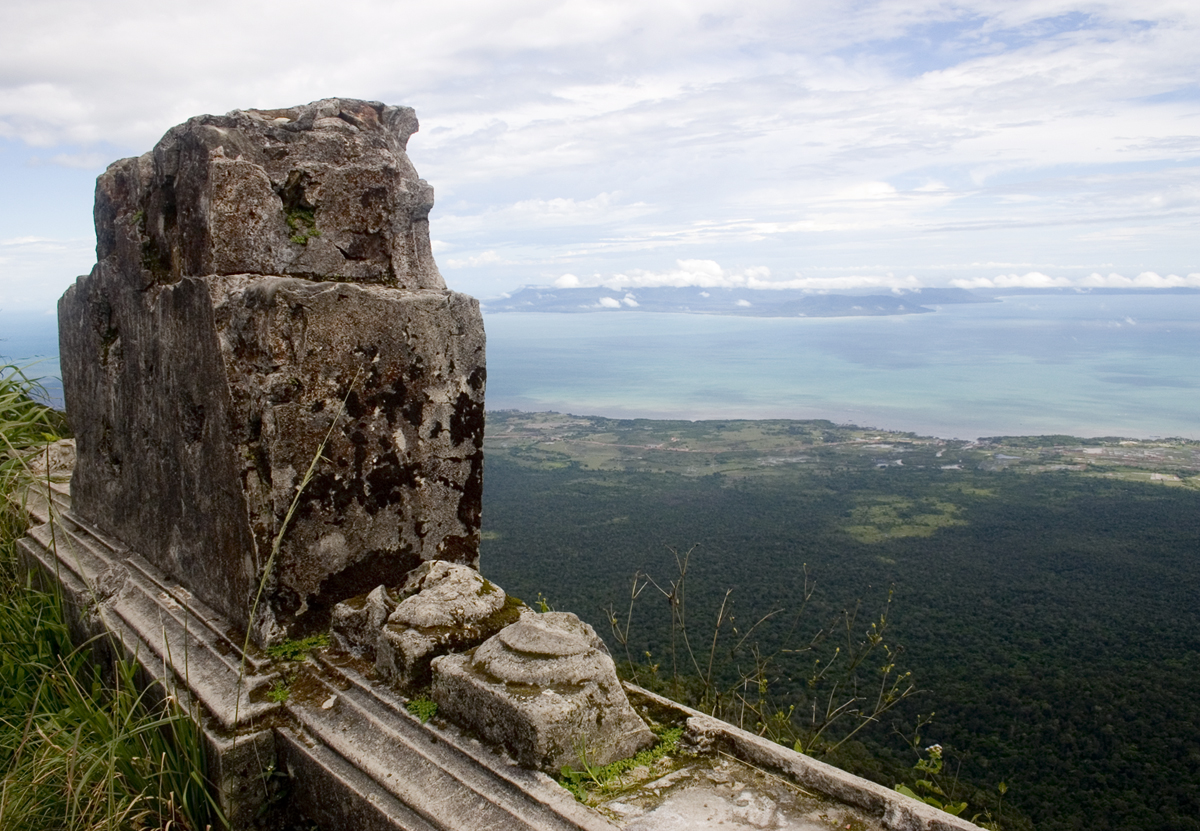
Phnom Bokor

=== Cities ===
- Battambang
- Kampot
- Kratié
- Phnom Penh
- Siem Reap
- Sihanoukville

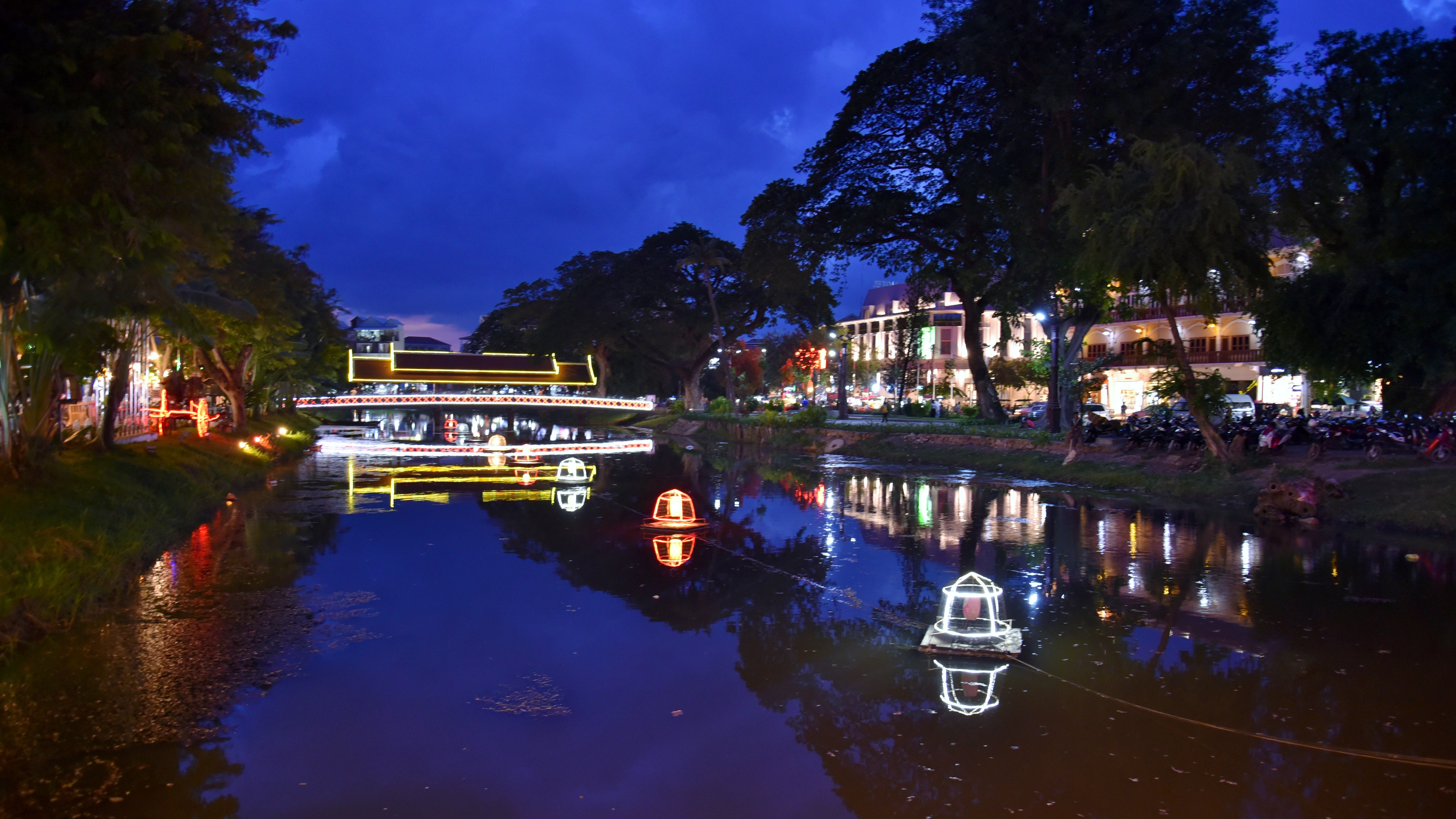
Siem Reap

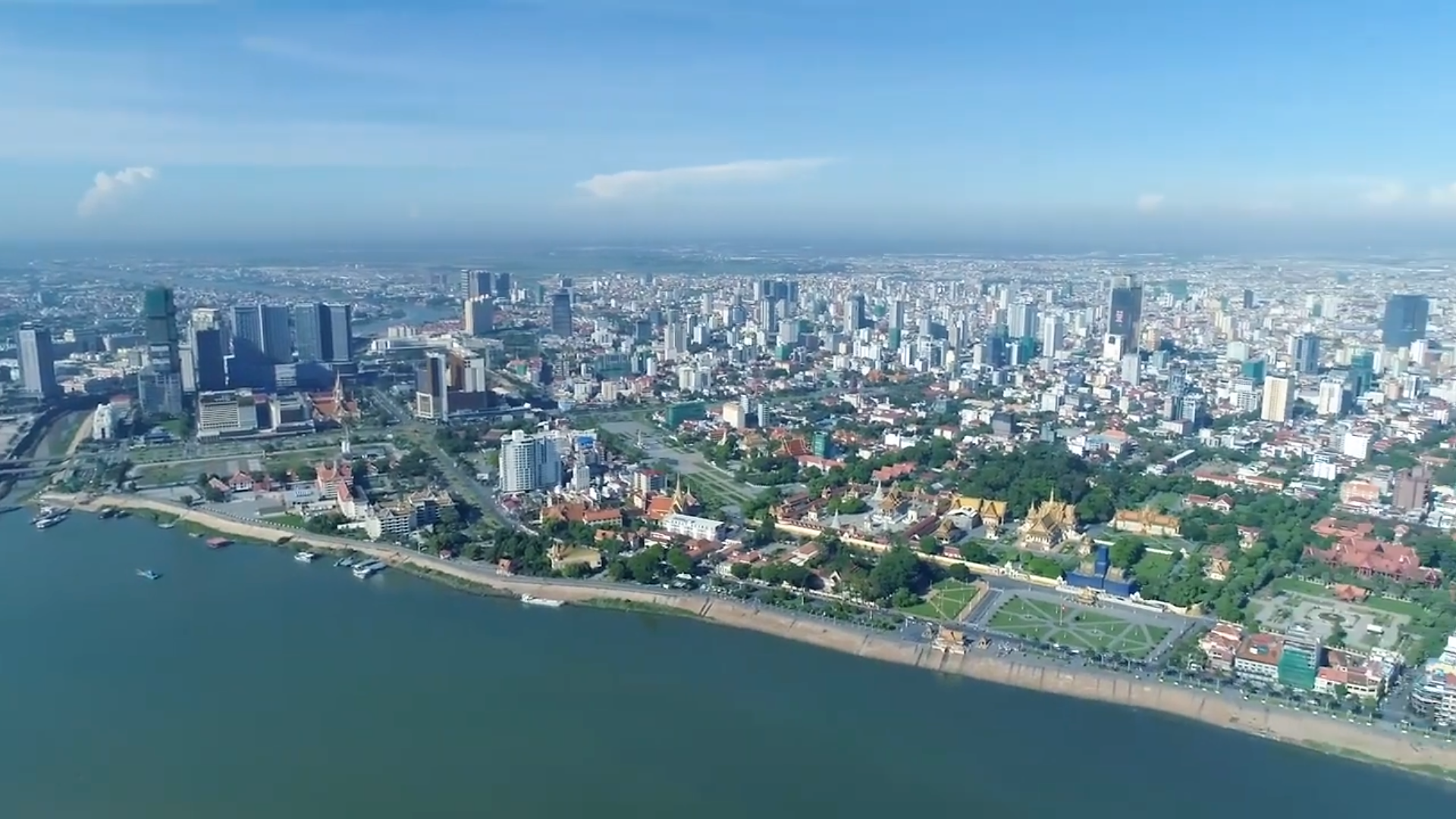
Phnom Penh

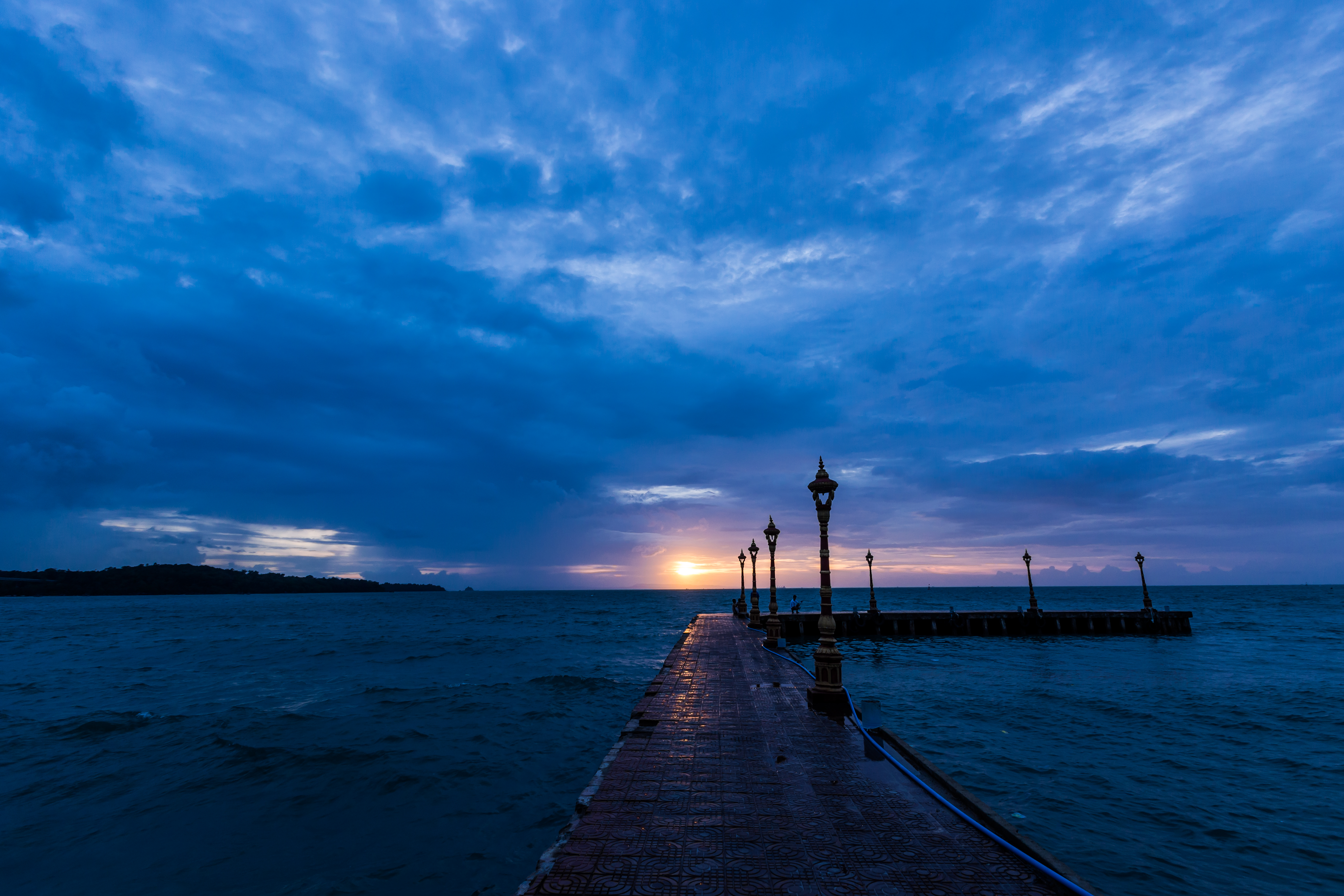
Sihanoukville

=== Other ===
- Angkor Borei and Phnom Da
- Banteay Chhmar
- Banteay Prey Nokor
- Banteay Srei
- Beng Mealea
- Bokor Hill Station
- Khmer Ceramics & Fine Arts Centre
- Koh Rong
- Koh Rong Sanloem
- Oudong
- Phnom Tamao Wildlife Rescue Centre
- Preah Khan Kompong Svay
- Silver Pagoda
- Royal Palace of Cambodia

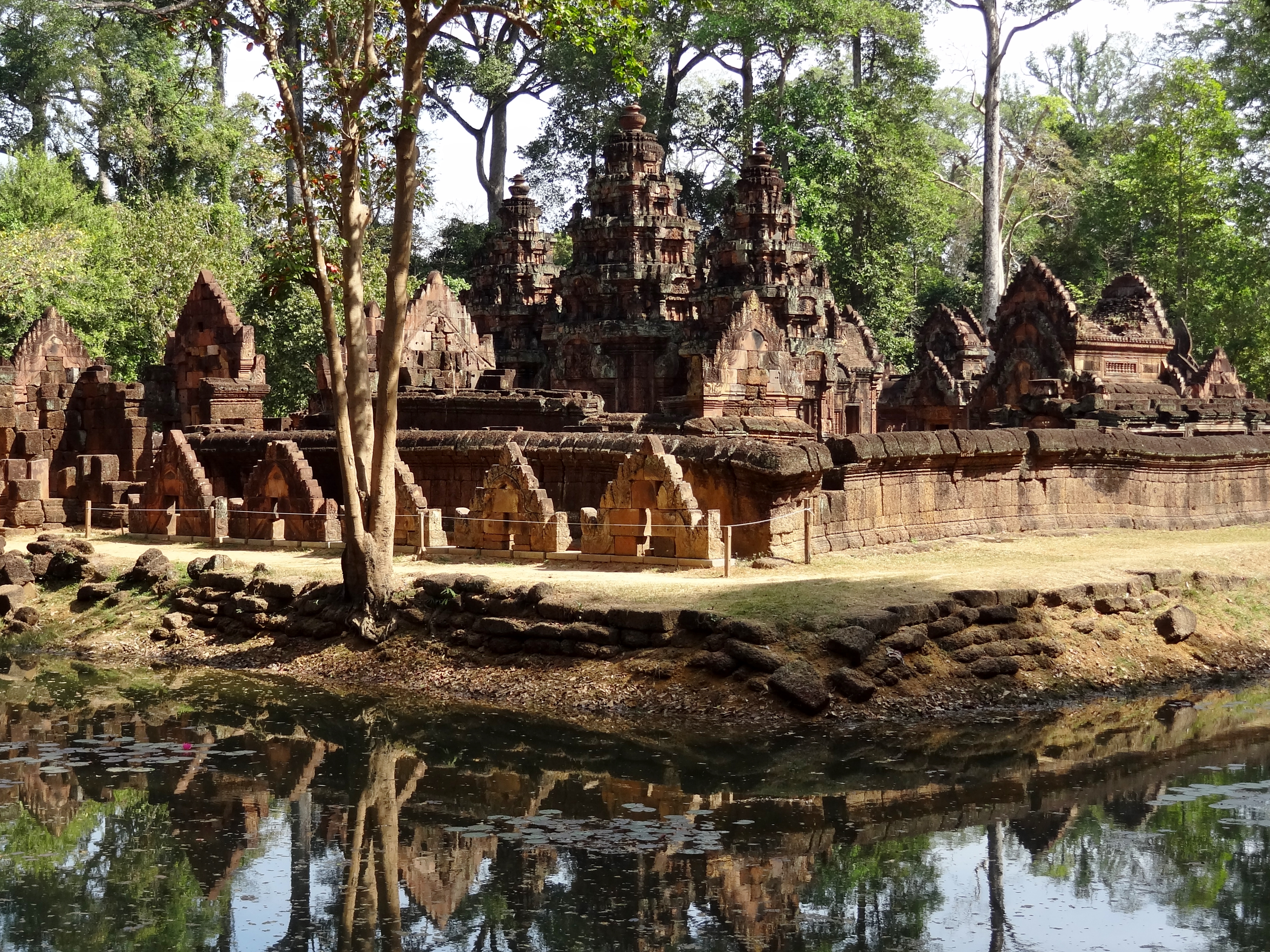
Banteay Srei

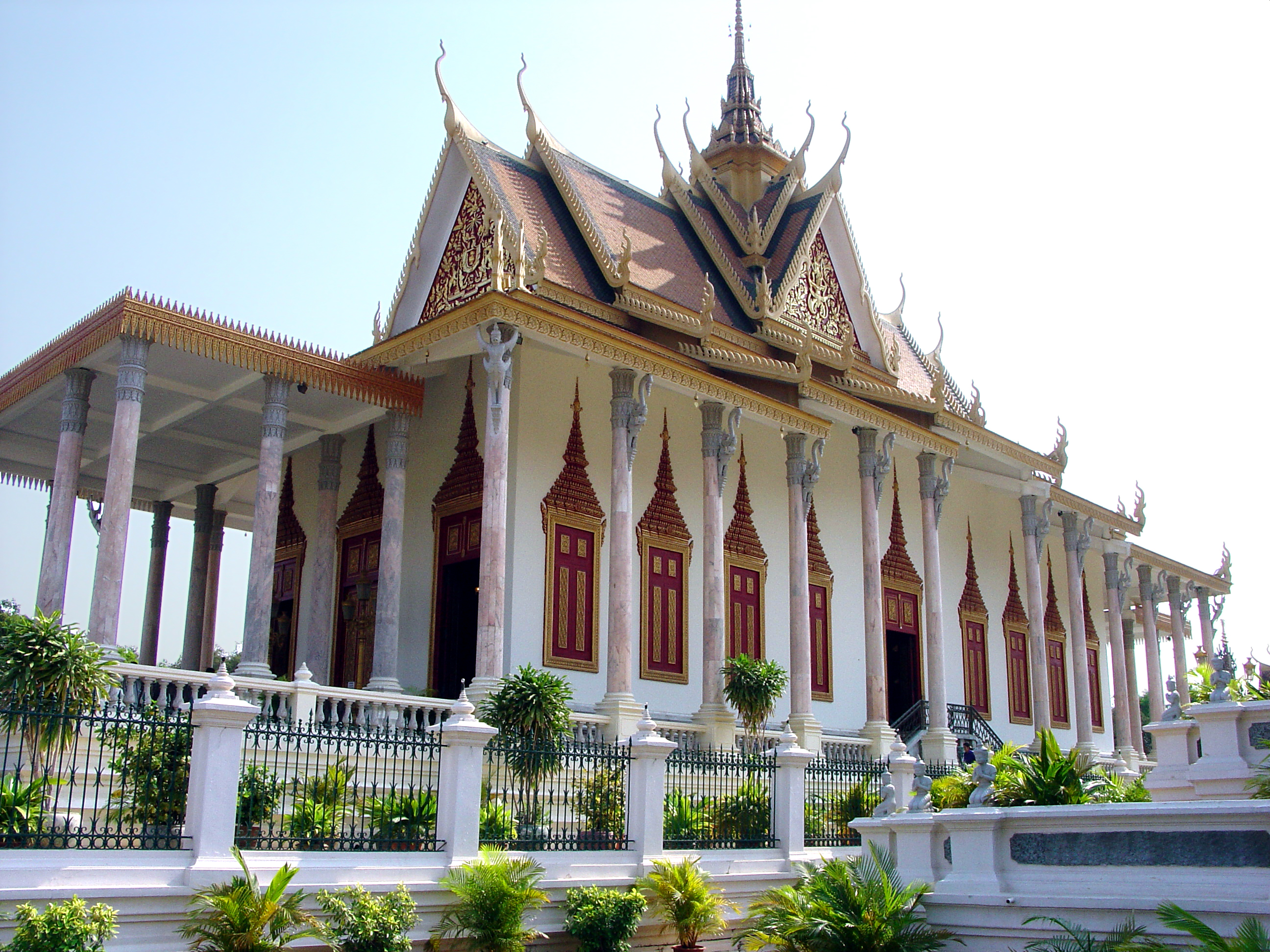
Silver Pagoda

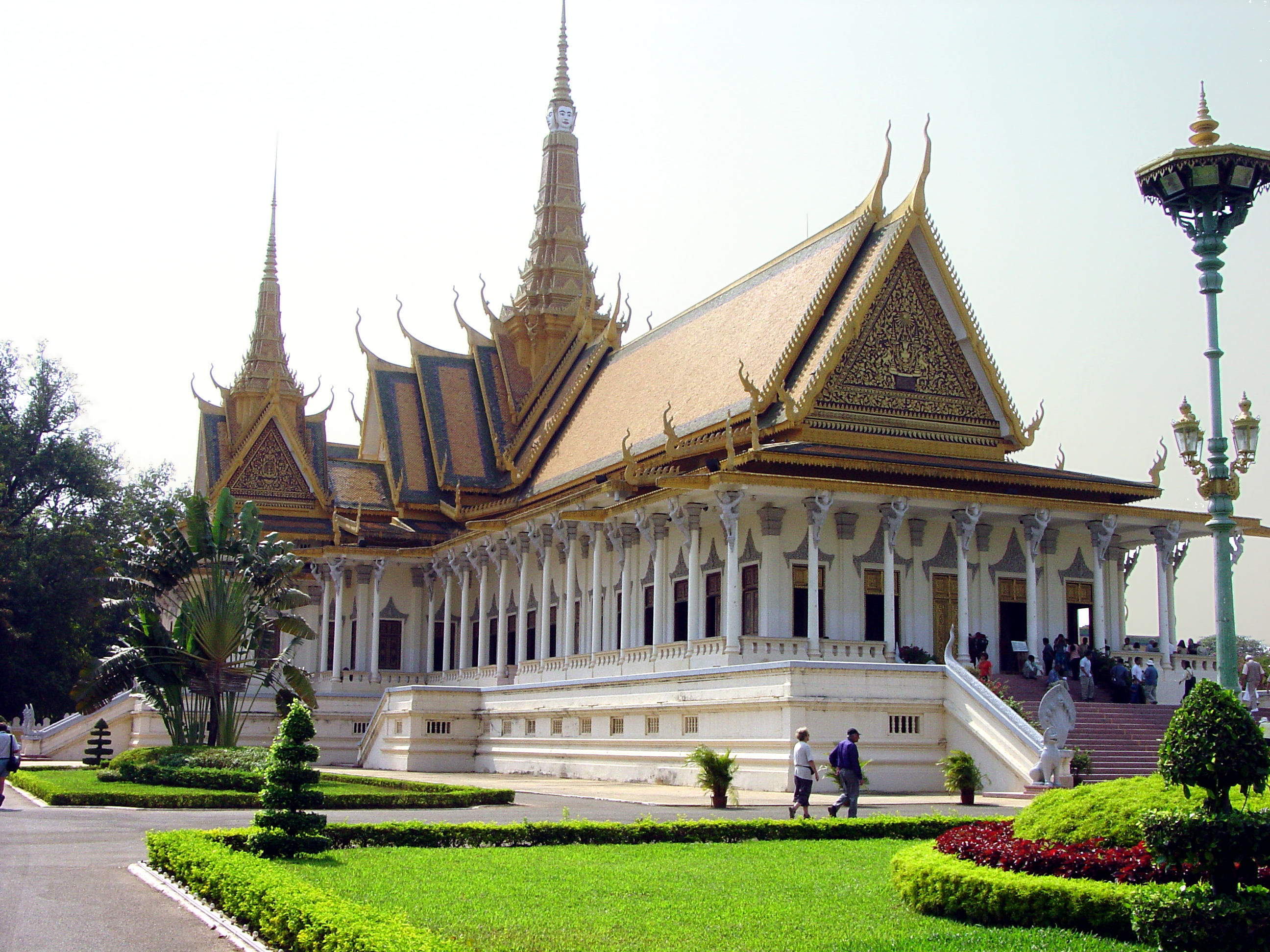
Royal Palace of Cambodia

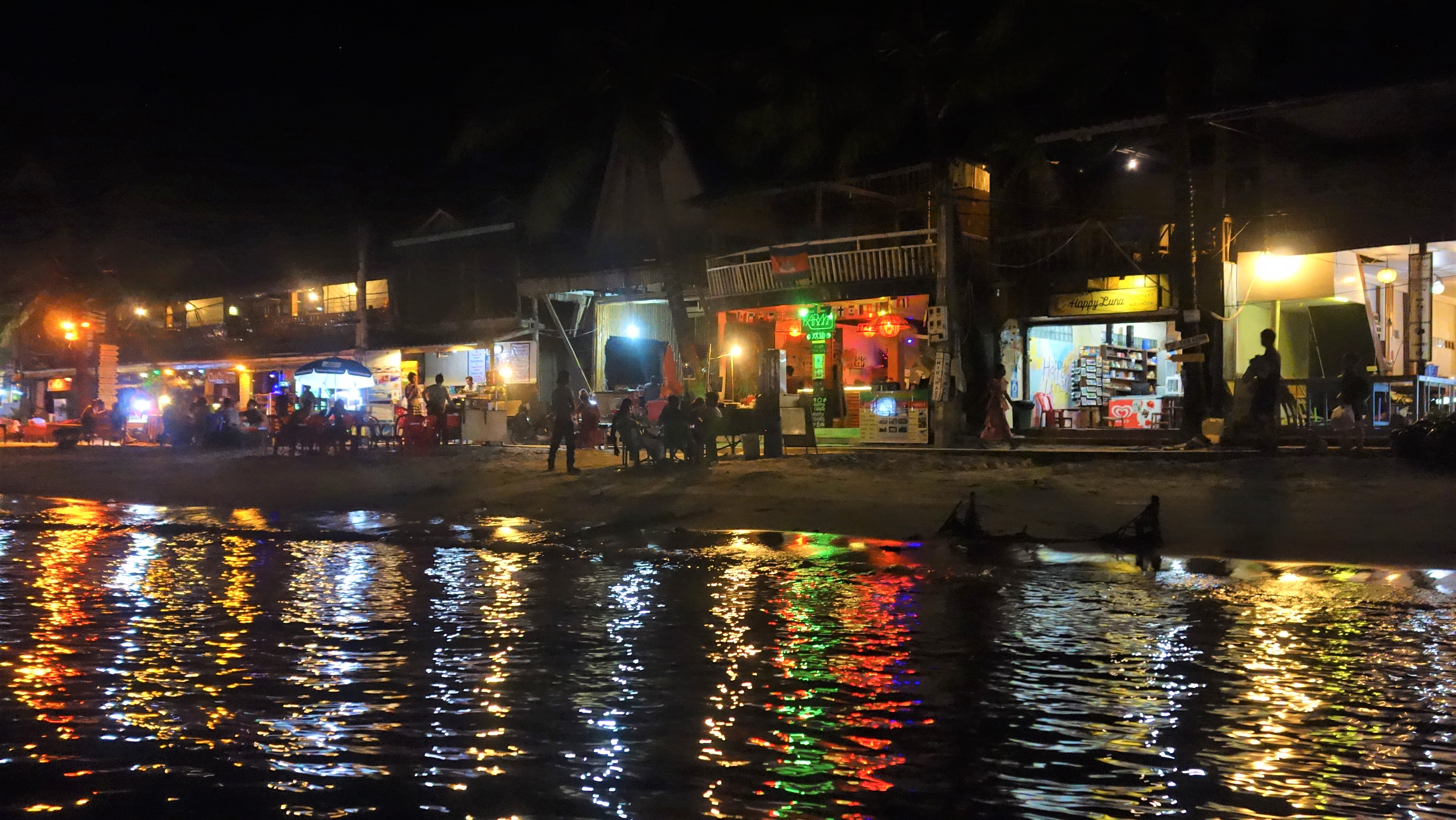
Bars in Koh Rong

== Orphanage tourism ==
Whilst there are approximately over half a million orphans in the country, only 1% of Cambodian orphans live in orphanages with most parentless children cared for by their extended family or community. Yet, these institutions receive a huge amount of support both in donations and volunteer applications. According to UNICEF, the largest financial support comes from Australia, particularly from faith-based organisations, with 51% of churchgoers and over 3,000 local churches supporting care institutions both in Cambodia and throughout Southeast Asia.

This support is ensured thanks to a booming orphanage tourism industry which has become a major problem across the country. An increasing number of travel agencies, charities, universities and high schools advertise placements to Cambodian orphanages. As visitor numbers grow, there has been an explosion in the number of orphanages - between 2005 and 2015, there was a 60% increase, with half concentrated in the tourist destinations and two largest cities of Phnom Penh and Siem Reap. Facility owners have recognized an opportunity to profit significantly from an increased pool of foreign donors and volunteers, with around half being completely unlicensed or unregulated.

The industry is also fuelled by poverty with poor families latching on to the false hope of a better education for their children within these institutions. According to the Department of Social Affairs, Veterans and Youth Rehabilitation: “There is a general idea amongst ordinary people that ‘our children can lead a good life in the RCIs (residential care institutions)’.’’. Due to a lack of strong state assistance in education and social services for children, poor families are tempted to give up their children to RCI’s with the hope that they will be more adequately provided for.

Many facilities are poorly run, incentivized by the prospect of lucrative profits. Research has shown that since the neediest institutions are likely to receive the most money from the altruistic donors, some are kept deliberately in bad conditions despite substantial donations. Sometimes, children are also paraded through the streets, taught to beg, sell goods, and perform to tourists for money. In this way, they become an exploited commodity, lining the pockets of institution owners.

Even in legitimate, well-run orphanages, such facilities can still be damaging; institutionalised children are more likely to experience developmental delays, behavioural issues, poor physical health and reduced intellectual capability compared to those living at home with parents or extended carers. Volunteers that come to these orphanages are usually unskilled and only stay for a short while. Not only does this create a child safeguarding risk, but it can also cause long-term emotional stress for already vulnerable children as they are encouraged to form close attachments with strangers only to be abandoned repeatedly.

== See also ==
- Visa policy of Cambodia
- History of Cambodia
- Culture of Cambodia
- Dance of Cambodia
- Clothing of Cambodia
- Cuisine of Cambodia
- List of mammals in Cambodia
- List of birds of Cambodia
- List of islands of Cambodia
- Khmer language
