= The Tales of Beedle the Bard =

Book by J. K. Rowling

- The cover of the UK public paperback edition.
- Author: J. K. Rowling
- Illustrator: J. K. Rowling
- Language: English
- Series: Harry Potter
- Genre: Fantasy
- Set in: Wizarding World
- Publisher: Children's High Level Group, Bloomsbury Publishing
- Publication date: 4 December 2008
- Publication place: United Kingdom
- Pages: 110 (paperback)
- ISBN: 978-0-7475-9987-6

The Tales of Beedle the Bard is a book of fairy tales by author J. K. Rowling. There is a storybook of the same name mentioned in Harry Potter and the Deathly Hallows, the final novel of the Harry Potter series.

The book was originally produced in a limited edition of only seven copies, each handwritten and illustrated by J. K. Rowling. One of them was offered for auction through Sotheby's in late 2007 and was expected to sell for £50,000 (US$77,000, €69,000); ultimately it was bought for £1.95 million ($3 million, €2.7 million) by Amazon, making the selling price the highest achieved at auction for a modern literary manuscript. The money earned at the auction of the book was donated to The Children's Voice charity campaign.

The book was published for the general public on 4 December 2008, with the proceeds going to the Children's High Level Group (renamed Lumos in 2010).

== In the Harry Potter series ==
The symbol of the Hallows found in "The Tale of the Three Brothers"

The Tales of Beedle the Bard first appeared as a fictional book in J. K. Rowling's Harry Potter and the Deathly Hallows (2007), the seventh and final novel of the Harry Potter series. The book is bequeathed to Hermione Granger by Albus Dumbledore, former headmaster of Hogwarts School of Witchcraft and Wizardry. It is described as a popular collection of wizarding children's fairy tales, so that while Ron Weasley is familiar with the stories, Harry Potter and Hermione had not previously heard of them due to their non-magical upbringing.

The book Hermione receives in Dumbledore's will is a copy of the original edition of the fictional book. It is described as an ancient-looking small book with its binding "stained and peeling in places". In the novel it is also said the book has a title on its cover, written in embossed runic symbols.

The book acts as the vehicle for introducing the Deathly Hallows to the trio. Above the story "The Tale of the Three Brothers", Hermione finds a strange symbol which later is revealed by Xenophilius Lovegood to be the symbol of the Hallows. The triangle from the symbol represents the Cloak of Invisibility, the circle inside the triangle symbolises the Resurrection Stone, and the vertical line represents the Elder Wand.

These three objects are also mentioned in the story itself, and are said to belong to the Peverell brothers, who are later revealed as being both Lord Voldemort's and Harry's ancestors. Towards the end of the novel, Dumbledore also confirms Harry's connection to the Peverells, and states that the three brothers might in fact have been the creators of the Hallows.

The introduction (written by Rowling) to the publications released in December 2008 mentions that the fictional character Beedle the Bard was born in Yorkshire, lived in the fifteenth century, and had "an exceptionally luxuriant beard".

== Publication history ==
Rowling started writing the book soon after finishing work on the seventh Harry Potter novel. During an interview with her fandom she also stated that she used other books as a source of inspiration for the tales. More specifically, "The Tale of the Three Brothers", the only story included entirely in The Deathly Hallows, was inspired by Geoffrey Chaucer's "The Pardoner's Tale" from The Canterbury Tales.

=== Handmade edition ===
Originally The Tales of Beedle the Bard had only been produced in a limited number of seven handmade copies, all handwritten and illustrated by the author herself. The books were bound in brown morocco leather, and decorated with hand-chased silver ornaments and mounted semiprecious stones by silversmith and jeweller Hamilton & Inches of Edinburgh. Each of the silver pieces represents one of the five stories in the book. Rowling also asked that each of the seven copies be embellished using a different semiprecious stone.

Six of these original handwritten copies were uniquely dedicated and given by Rowling to six people who were most involved with the Harry Potter series. The recipients of these copies were not initially identified. Since then, two of these people have been named. One is Barry Cunningham, Rowling's very first editor. Another is Arthur A. Levine, editor for Scholastic, the U.S. publisher of the Harry Potter books. Cunningham and Levine had lent their personal copies as part of Beedle the Bard exhibits in December 2008.

Rowling also decided to create a seventh handwritten copy (distinguished from the others by its moonstone jewelling) to sell at auction in order to raise funds for The Children's Voice charity campaign.

The idea came really because I wanted to thank six key people who have been very closely connected to the 'Harry Potter' series, and these were people for whom a piece of jewellery wasn't going to cut it. So I had the idea of writing them a book, a handwritten and illustrated book, just for these six people. And well, if I'm doing six I really have to do seven, and the seventh book will be for this cause, which is so close to my heart.

— J. K. Rowling

=== Auction ===
The Moonstone edition of the book was auctioned in December 2007.

The 157-page "Moonstone edition" of the book was first put on display prior to bidding on 26 November in New York and on 9 December in London. The book was auctioned 13 December 2007, at Sotheby's in London. The starting price was £30,000 ($62,000, €46,000), and originally it was expected to sell for approximately £50,000 ($103,000, €80,000). The closing bid far exceeded all prior projections, as ultimately the book was purchased by a representative from London fine art dealers Hazlitt Gooden and Fox on behalf of Amazon, for a total of £1.95 million ($3.98 million, €2.28 million). This was the highest purchase price for a modern literary manuscript at that date. The money earned at auction later was donated by Rowling to The Children's Voice charity campaign.

Sotheby's printed a forty-eight-page promotional catalogue for the auction. The catalogue featured illustrations from the book, as well as comments from J. K. Rowling on The Tales of Beedle the Bard. The catalogue was sold as a collector's item, and the money from that sale also has been donated to The Children's Voice.

Cunningham's copy of the book was put up for auction in November 2016. It was auctioned for £368,750 on 12 December 2016. The book was auctioned by Sotheby's in London. The book is a leather bound manuscript decorated with rhodochrosite gemstones, and a silver skull. This copy features an author's note addressed to Cunningham which reads "To Barry, the man who thought an overlong novel about a boy wizard in glasses might just sell ... THANK YOU." She has also added a note describing the gemstones as being "traditionally associated with love, balance and joy in daily life".

=== Public editions ===
On 31 July 2008, it was announced The Tales of Beedle the Bard would also be made available for the public, in both standard and collector's editions. The book was published by Children's High Level Group and printed and distributed by Bloomsbury, Scholastic, and Amazon. The decision was taken due to disappointment among Harry Potter fans after it had initially been announced a wide public release was not intended.

Similarly to Fantastic Beasts and Where to Find Them and Quidditch Through the Ages (two other books mentioned in the Harry Potter novels that have also been printed) the standard and collector's editions of The Tales of Beedle the Bard feature commentary and footnotes from Albus Dumbledore, headmaster of Hogwarts and one of the main characters of the series. The standard edition also includes illustrations reproduced from the handwritten edition auctioned in December 2007 and the introduction by the author. The limited collector's edition features ten illustrations by J.K. Rowling not included in the standard edition or the original handcrafted edition, as well as an exclusive reproduction of J.K. Rowling's handwritten introduction, and other miscellaneous objects such as replica gemstones and an emerald ribbon.

The book, released on 4 December 2008, was published in the United Kingdom and Canada by Bloomsbury, while the US edition was published by Scholastic, and the limited collector's edition of the book, available in all three countries, by Amazon. The limited edition retailed for £50 ($100, €100), and around 100,000 copies have been printed. The book has been translated into 28 languages. Profits from the sale of the book were offered to the Children's High Level Group. Initial sale estimates were roughly £4 million ($7.6 million, €4.7 million); as of January 2010 an estimated £11 million ($17 million, €13 million) were generated from sales for the charity.

== Synopsis ==
=== Overview ===
The book compiles five stories by Rowling. "The Tale of the Three Brothers" first appeared in Deathly Hallows, while three others received cursory attention in the same novel: "The Wizard and the Hopping Pot", "The Fountain of Fair Fortune", and "Babbitty Rabbitty and her Cackling Stump". Only "The Warlock's Hairy Heart" was not previously mentioned in Deathly Hallows.

=== "The Wizard and the Hopping Pot" ===
This story is about the legacy of an old man who, in his generosity, used his magic for other people when they needed his help; he credited his little cauldron, which he called his lucky cooking pot, as the source of his potions, charms and antidotes. Upon his death, he leaves all his belongings to his only son, who has none of the virtues his father had.

After his father's death, the son finds the pot and a single slipper inside it, together with a note from his father that reads, "In the fond hope, my son, that you will never need it". Bitter for having nothing left but a pot, the son closes the door on a grandmother that seeks a cure for her granddaughter's crop of warts. Soon after, the son finds that his father's little pot has grown a brass foot that clanks loudly with each hop, and that proceeds to grow warts on its surface. The pot follows the son at all times, preventing him from resting properly.

Angry over his predicament, the son refuses to provide help for a man who has lost his donkey, and a mother whose baby is grievously ill. Each time he does so, the pot takes on the symptoms of the ones who ask for help, groaning in hunger and filling itself with tears; even after no more villagers come to his house looking for help, the pot takes on more and more symptoms, disturbing the son and preventing him from having any peace of mind.

This continues until the son finally gives up and provides aid to the town, running up the street at night and casting helping spells at every direction. Upon doing this, the pot's ailments are removed one by one. The son's ordeal finally ends when the slipper he received from his father falls out of the pot; the pot allows the son to put the slipper on its foot and, with its footsteps muffled at last, the two walk back home.

=== "The Fountain of Fair Fortune" ===
In this story, there is a fountain where once per year, one person may bathe and have their problems answered. Three witches — Asha, who suffers from an incurable disease; Altheda, who was robbed of her wand and wealth; and Amata, who is distraught after being left by her beloved — decide to try to reach the fountain together. Along the way, they are joined by Sir Luckless, a hapless Muggle knight.

On their path to the fountain, they face three challenges: a giant worm that demands "proof of [their] pain", which quenches its thirst with the tears Asha sheds from frustration after several failed attempts to pass; a steep slope where they have to bring the "fruit of their labours", which Altheda encourages the others to overcome with her, through hard effort and the sweat of her brow; and a river that requires "the treasure of [their] past" as payment for crossing, which Amata uses as a Pensieve that washes away her regret for her cruel and false lover, and finally brings her peace.

After the four cross the river, however, Asha collapses from exhaustion; to save her, Altheda brews an invigorating potion that also cures Asha of her disease completely, in turn causing Altheda to realise that her skills as a potioneer are a means to earn her wealth back.

Realising that each of their problems was solved without the fountain's fortune, the witches urge Sir Luckless to bathe in the fountain, as a reward for his chivalry and his earnest effort to help them on their journey. After bathing, flushed with confidence and triumph, he flings himself at Amata's feet and asks for "her hand and her heart", which she happily gives. Satisfied with the result of their journey, the four companions go on to live long and happy lives, unaware that the fountain holds no magical power at all.

=== "The Warlock's Hairy Heart" ===
The story is about a young and handsome warlock who, after deeming that love made his friends and contemporaries look foolish, decides to never fall in love, employing the Dark Arts to prevent himself from doing so. His family, unaware of his secret, did nothing.

As time went on and the warlock grew older, his peers would marry and have children, and his aged parents would pass away. Feeling neither jealously nor grief from being alone, the warlock is proud of his choice. However, one day, he hears two servants whispering about him not having a wife, expressing both pity and derision. With his pride hurt, he decides to find a talented, rich, and beautiful witch and marry her to gain everyone's envy.

By coincidence, he meets such a girl the next day. Though the girl is both "fascinated and repelled", the warlock persuades her to come to a dinner feast at his castle. During the feast, the warlock tries to woo the witch with empty words. Unimpressed, she tells him that she would be delighted by his affection, if she only thought he had a heart.

The warlock shows her his beating heart, now shrivelled and covered in hair, inside a crystal casket in his dungeon. The witch begs him to put it back inside himself, after which she embraces him. However, being disconnected from its body for so long, his heart has developed savage tastes as it has degenerated into an animalistic state.

And so, the warlock is driven to take by force a truly human heart, tearing out the witch's to replace his own; but upon finding that he cannot magic the hairy heart back out of his chest, he cuts it out with a dagger. Thus he and the maiden both die, with him holding both hearts in his hands.

=== "Babbitty Rabbitty and her Cackling Stump" ===
This story is about a king who wants to keep all magic to himself. To do this he needs to solve two problems: he must capture and imprison all of the sorcerers in the kingdom and he has to learn magic. He creates a "Brigade of Witch Hunters" and calls for an instructor in magic. Only a "cunning charlatan" with no magical ability responds.

The charlatan proves himself with a few simple tricks and begins to ask for jewellery and money to continue teaching. However, Babbitty, the king's washerwoman, laughs at the king one day as he attempts to do magic with an ordinary twig. This causes the king to demand the charlatan join him in a public demonstration of magic, and warns that the man will be beheaded if the king can't perform magic. The charlatan later witnesses Babbitty performing magic in her house. He threatens to expose her if she does not assist him. She agrees to hide and help the demonstration.

During the performance, after seeing a hat disappear and a horse being levitated, the brigade captain asks the king to bring his dead hound back to life. Because Babbitty cannot use magic to raise the dead, the crowd thinks the previous acts were tricks. The charlatan exposes Babbitty, accusing her of blocking the spells. Chased by the king and his courtiers, Babbitty flees into a forest and disappears at the base of an old tree. In desperation, the charlatan states that she has turned into the tree itself, and has it cut down.

As the crowd departs, the stump starts cackling and makes the charlatan confess his deception, after suggesting that the king use the axe to cut him in half. After the charlatan is hauled away, the stump cackles again, demanding the king never hurt a wizard again, and build a statue of Babbitty on the stump to remind him of his foolishness. The king agrees and heads back to the palace. Afterwards, a "stout old rabbit" with a wand in its teeth hops out from a hole beneath the stump and leaves the kingdom.

=== "The Tale of the Three Brothers" ===
The story is about three brothers who, while traveling together, reach a treacherous river. They make a magical bridge over the river wherein just as they cross, they meet the personification of Death, who is angry for losing three potential victims. He pretends to be impressed by them and grants each a gift as a reward, hoping to use each gift to bring about their eventual demises. The oldest brother asks for an unbeatable dueling wand, so Death gives him the Elder Wand. The middle brother asks for the ability to resurrect the dead to humiliate Death further, so Death gives him the Resurrection Stone. The youngest brother, a humbler man, does not trust Death and asks for a way to stop Death from following him, so Death reluctantly gives him his Cloak of Invisibility. Afterward, the brothers go their separate ways.

The oldest brother resolves a previous qualm by using the wand to kill the man with whom he quarrelled, but his bragging about the wand's incredible power results in him getting robbed of it and murdered in his sleep, allowing Death to claim him. The middle brother resolves a previous loss by using the stone to bring back the woman to whom he wanted to be married, but she is revealed to be non-corporeal and full of sorrow for being back in the mortal world; in grief, he commits suicide, allowing Death to claim him. However, Death never manages to find the youngest brother, as he stays hidden under the invisibility cloak. Many years later, the brother removes his cloak and gives it to his son. Content with the life he has lived, he greets Death as an old friend and equal, thereby dying of natural causes.

== Reception ==
Sotheby's deputy director Philip W. Errington described the handmade edition as "one of the most exciting pieces of children's literature" to have passed through the auction house. After buying the book, Amazon also released a review, describing it as "an artifact pulled straight out of a novel".

The Times reviewed the published book favourably, calling the tales "funny, sinister, wise and captivating" and likening them to the tales collected by the Brothers Grimm. The Telegraph reviewed it unfavourably, noting that they "would be unremarkable were it not for the body of work that lies behind it" and that there was "an element of padding to make it a respectable length".

== Live show ==
A live puppet show of The Fountain of Fair Fortune and The Tale of the Three Brothers is presented daily at the Diagon Alley expansion of The Wizarding World of Harry Potter at Universal Studios Florida.

== Film adaptation ==
Due to "The Tale of the Three Brothers" originally being in the novel Harry Potter and the Deathly Hallows, the story was also adapted as an animated short in the novel's first film adaptation, Harry Potter and the Deathly Hallows – Part 1. The sequence was directed by Ben Hibon and animated at Framestore; like in the novel, it is also narrated in-universe by Hermione Granger (Emma Watson).

== See also ==
- List of most expensive books and manuscripts
