= Georgette Mulheir =

Georgette Mulheir was the chief executive of Lumos, an international non-governmental organisation, founded in 2005 by J. K. Rowling to end the institutionalisation of orphaned children throughout the world, from 2011 to 2019. Her model of deinstitutionalisation, pioneered since 1993, has been followed in many countries across Eastern and central Europe.

== Biography ==
Mulheir was born in Oldham in 1968. She has two brothers and a sister. Her father was a carpenter and her mother was a residential social worker. After studying music at Sheffield University, she worked for Sheffield Social Services from 1991 in a mother and baby unit. In 1993, she moved to Romania to set up the first mother and baby unit in Bucharest, and since then she has pioneered a model of deinstitutionalisation which is now followed in many countries across Central and Eastern Europe. Between 1993 and 2015, the number of children in Romanian orphanages has been reduced from 200,000 to 20,000.

In 2007, she was appointed operations director of Lumos, becoming chief executive in 2011. She was a member of the Ad Hoc Expert Group which produced a report on the Transition from Institutional to Community-based Care for the European Commission in 2009. Mulheir is a member of the governing council of the Global Alliance for Children, established in 2013. She is also an advisor to the European Commission on the reform of children's services.

In 2014 she was named as one of the 30 most influential social workers in the world, on a list compiled by the US website Social Work Degree Guide. She is fluent in Romanian and speaks French, Arabic, and Croatian on a conversational level.

== Professional Work ==
As a teenager, Mulheir was a member of the anti-apartheid movement and Amnesty International. While attending university, she did volunteer work with sexual abuse survivors and refugees. She helped women learn English in the local community. She also performed some volunteer work in Romania prior to her work at Lumos. As one of her first projects in 1991, Mulheir set up a service in Romania that helped teenage mothers keep their children. In 1993, she started the development of a mother and baby unit in Romania to end institutionalisation. Over the next 10 years, she worked with communities and governments in Romania and helped the government develop a plan that reduced institution numbers by 95%. She has done work with institutions in 23 countries since then. Currently, Mulheir and her colleagues are looking to develop new programs in Ukraine and Hungary. She is also working to build the organisation's profile to display the work being done at the organisation. She focuses her work in Central and Eastern Europe as these places have the biggest problems. Lumos has been highly successful in Moldova, where there has been a 70% decrease in the number of children in institutions over a six-year span. In Moldova, Lumos helped to set up an education system and worked with parents to prepare them for when the children left the institutions. The charity split, with the Romanian branch deciding to go their own way.

Mulheir has published four books on children's rights. She is a member of the Commission on Civil Society and Democratic Engagement. In the US, in 2015, she was honoured in the 6th Tribeca Disruptive Innovation Awards for her work. Georgette has been head of Hope and Homes, where she was a social services consultant.

In May 2012, she gave a TED Talk on the tragedy of orphanages, encouraging people to find alternate sources for supporting children.

She was asked to step down from her position as CEO of Lumos in July 2019 after the organisation said there were "management and culture challenges" that needed "immediate action".

== Books and publications ==
- G.Mulheir, K.Browne, S.Darabus, G.Misca, D. M. Pop, B. Wilson (2004). Deinstitutionalisation of Children's Services in Romania. UNICEF and Government of Romania. ISBN 973-8411-26-2.
- Mulheir, Georgette (2000). Private pain, public action: Violence against women in war and peace: a comparative study of the role and development of non-governmental organisations ... Northern Ireland and the Republic of Ireland. University of Limerick: Centre for Peace and Development Studies. ISBN 978-1874653592.
- G.Mulheir, L.Marginean, L.Rotaru (2008). Healing the Past Building the Future: Family Type 764 984 in the Republic of Moldova (in Romanian). Chişinău, Moldova: s.n. ISBN 9789975770972.
- Mulheir, Georgette (2012). "Deinstitutionalisation – A Human Rights Priority for Children with Disabilities" (PDF). The Equal Rights Review. 9: 117–137.
- Mulheir, Georgette (September 2015). "Why influencing other funding is the best way to achieve your mission". Alliance Magazine.
