= Cage bed =

Physical restraint device

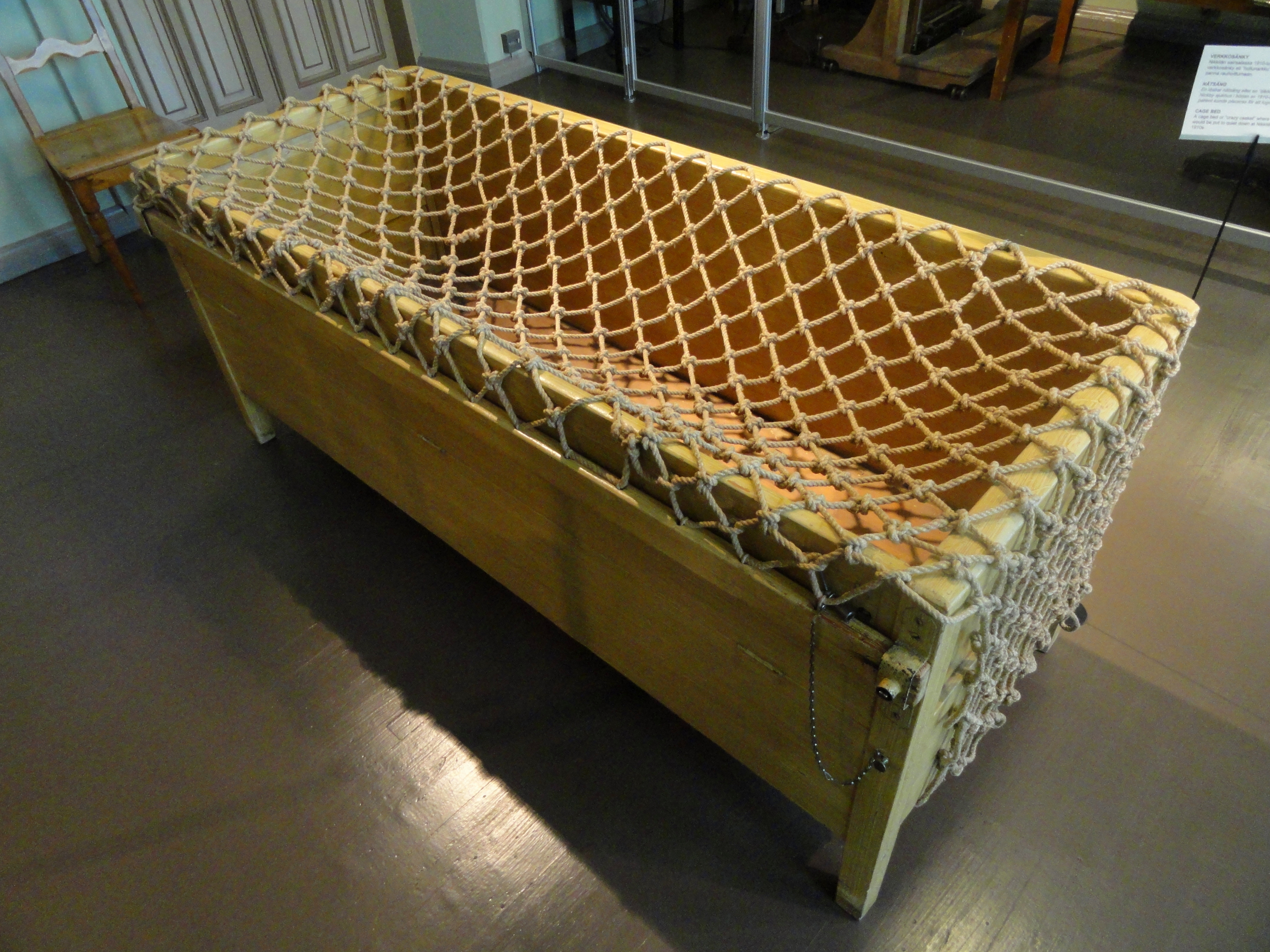
Cage bed for the mentally ill, 1910, Helsinki University Museum

A cage bed is a bed with either metal bars or netting designed to restrain a person of any given age, including children, within the boundaries of the bed. They were once commonplace in Central and Eastern Europe and used to restrain disabled people, including autistic people and those with learning difficulties, epilepsy, hyperactivity and mental health problems in psychiatric institutions. As of 2014, the Mental Disability Advocacy Center says cage beds are used in Greece, the Czech Republic and Romania.

Psychiatrists in the Czech Republic previously defended the use of the beds in social care but their use in children's care homes was later banned in the country due to international pressure, and an appeal by J. K. Rowling, who later went on to found Lumos, which promotes an end to the institutionalisation of children worldwide.

== See also ==
- Medical restraint
- Sedation
