= Orphanage tourism =

Travel to visit orphanages

Orphanage tourism is a type of tourism in which the wealthy of western countries visit orphanages in poorer countries. The practice has been described as commodifying the orphans for the benefit of tour operators and the management of the orphanages, while the tourists are exploited for their money. The children are expected to be "poor but happy" and are encouraged to engage in inappropriately intimate encounters with strangers with the risk of abuse.

Orphanage tourism is characterized as a form of volunteer tourism, a concept which itself has been subjected to heavy criticism.

== Anti-orphanage campaigns ==
J.K. Rowling's charity Lumos opposes orphanage tourism as a form of human trafficking. In 2018, Australia, with the support of Lumos, passed groundbreaking legislation to ban "orphanage trafficking." Some researchers have questioned the underlying idea that the children in tourism orphanages are "slaves" being "held against their will." Interviews with ex-orphanage children described a mixture of experiences in reaction to being "rescued" from for-profit orphanages and placed with NGOs or with impoverished biological families.
