= Lumos (charity) =

Charity founded by J.K. Rowling

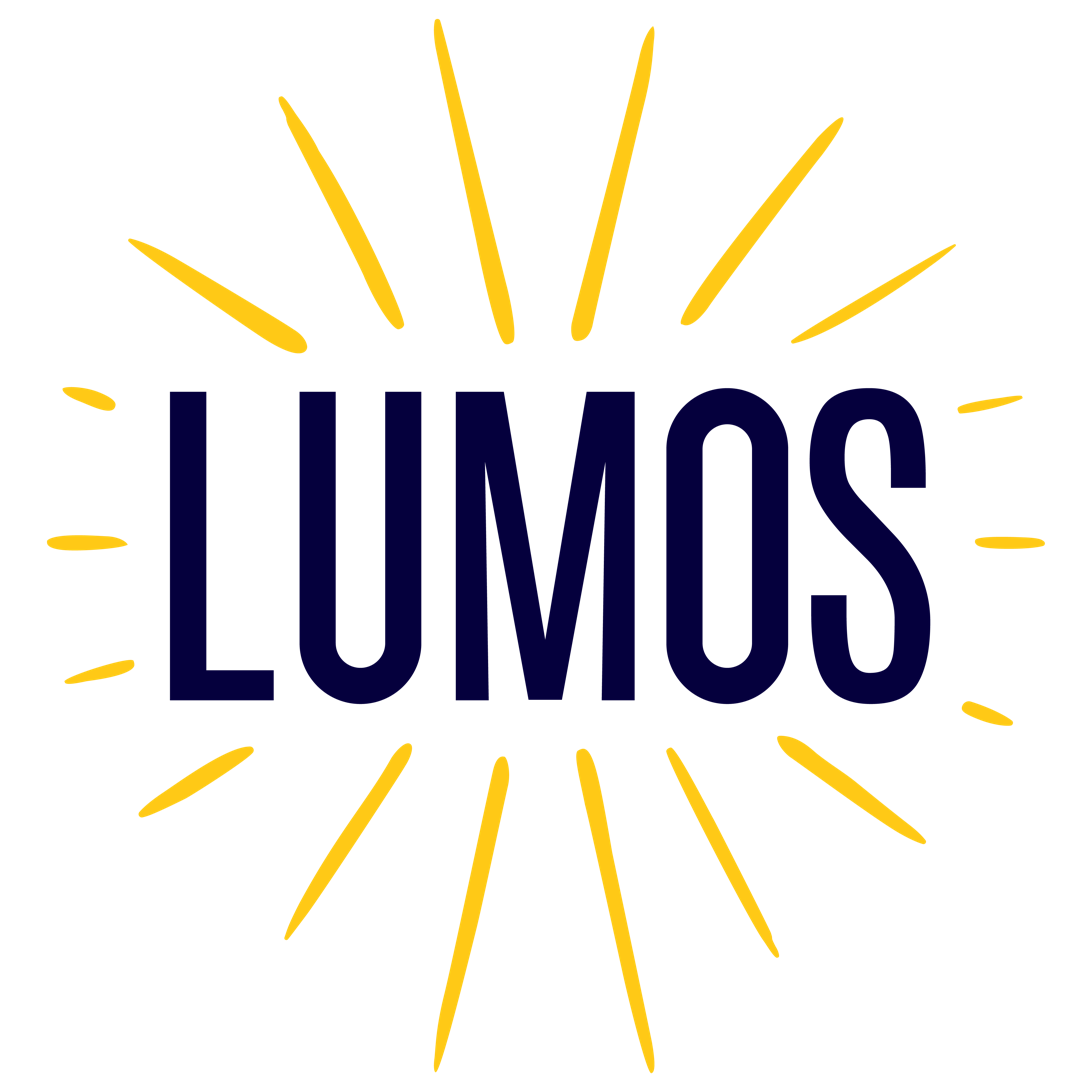
- Formation: 2005 (relaunched as Lumos in 2010)
- Type: NGO/Charity
- Purpose: Children/young people's welfare; health/education/social care; family support
- Location: London, UK (head office)
- Region served: Global
- Founder and president: J. K. Rowling
- Main organ: Board of Trustees, chaired by Ken Towle
- Website: Official website

Lumos, formerly known as Children's High Level Group and briefly as The Children's Voice, is an international non-governmental charity (NGO) founded by the author of the Harry Potter book series, J. K. Rowling. Lumos promotes an end to the institutionalisation of children worldwide.

== History ==
Previous logo (2010-2021).

In 2004, Rowling read an article in The Sunday Times about children with disabilities who were placed in cage beds. She and Emma Nicholson co-founded the Children's High Level Group (CHLG) in 2005. CHLG was briefly renamed The Children's Voice, but then changed back to its original name because "The Children's Voice" was trademarked in the US. It became Lumos, after a spell in Harry Potter (which in the series illuminates the tip of the caster's wand with a bright light), in 2010. Rowling stood down as a trustee in 2013 but continued as the charity's president.

Lumos and other organisations have worked to encourage the European Commission to establish regulations that state that funding to EU member states must be used for community services, not to build or renovate residential institutions. Even before the regulations were passed, as a result of years of advocacy and awareness-raising, this principle of funding supporting 'deinstitutionalization' (DI) had already helped divert more than €367 million of EU funding away from institutions towards community services.

In 2019, Rowling launched a major awareness campaign against orphanage tourism, claiming that "eight million children live in orphanages" which exposes them to "all forms of abuse and trafficking." In 2025, Lumos announced that over 20 years, it had diverted 280,000 children from orphanages and institutions towards family-based care.

== Governance and people ==
Georgette Mulheir stepped down as CEO in 2020 after trustees identified "management and cultural challenges" and commissioned independent reviews into governance and culture.

Howard Taylor joined as CEO in November 2024, succeeding former CEO, Peter McDermott.

Ken Towle is the Chair of the Board of Trustees. Other trustees include: Rosanna Burcheri, Neena Gill CBE, Nick Pasricha, Dr Doreen Mulenga, Neal Gandhi, Elizabeth Lule and Usman Ali.

The Lumos Foundation USA Board members are Bella Berns and Dale Cendali.

== Works cited ==
- Pugh, Tison (2020). Harry Potter and Beyond: On J. K. Rowling's Fantasies and Other Fictions. Columbia, South Carolina: University of South Carolina Press. doi:10.2307/j.ctvs09qwv. ISBN 978-1-64336-088-1. OCLC 1142046769. S2CID 225791872.
