= B2 (classification) =

Blindness sports classification

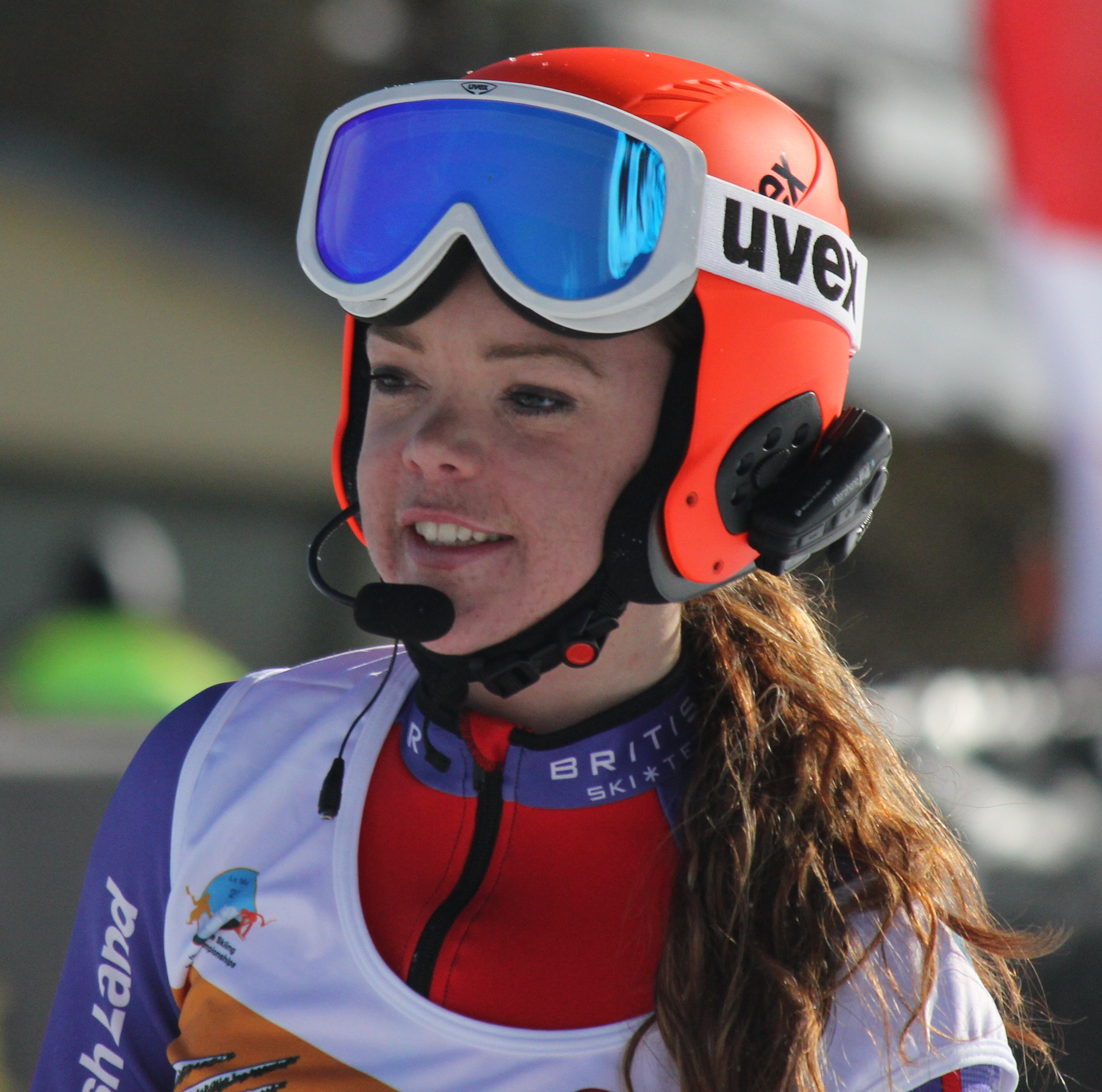
Britain's Jade Etherington is a B2 classified Paralympic athlete.

B2 is a medical based Paralympic classification for blind sport. Competitors in this classification have vision that falls between the B1 and B3 classes. The International Blind Sports Federation (IBSA) defines this classification as "visual acuity ranging from LogMAR 1.50 to 2.60 (inclusive) and/or visual field constricted to a diameter of less than 10 degrees." It is used by a number of blind sports including para-alpine skiing, para-Nordic skiing, blind cricket, blind golf, five-a-side football, goalball and judo. Some sports, including adaptive rowing, athletics and swimming, have equivalents to this class.

The B2 classification was first created by the IBSA in the 1970s, and has largely remained unchanged since despite an effort by the International Paralympic Committee (IPC) to move towards a more functional and evidence-based classification system. Classification is often handled on the international level by IBSA although it is also handled by national sport federations. There are exceptions for sports like athletics and cycling, where classification is handled by their own governing bodies.

Equipment utilized by competitors in this class may differ from sport to sport, and may include sighted guides, guide rails, beeping balls and clapsticks. There may be some modifications related to equipment and rules to specifically address needs of competitors in this class to allow them to compete in specific sports. Some sports specifically do not allow a guide, whereas cycling and skiing require one.

== Definition ==
B2 is a disability sport classification for people who are visually impaired. The International Blind Sports Federation (IBSA) defines this classification as "visual acuity ranging from LogMAR 1.50 to 2.60 (inclusive) and/or visual field constricted to a diameter of less than 10 degrees." It thus falls between the B1 and B3 classifications. The Canadian Paralympic Committee defined this classification as "Up to approximately 3-5% functional vision." This classification is borrowed by some other sports, including blind golf who also define the class as "From ability to recognise the shape of a hand up to visual acuity of 2/60 or visual field of less than 5 degrees". Para-alpine skiing sport specific versions of this definition include one by the Australian Paralympic Committee which defined this classification as this classification as "Athletes with some partial vision or the ability to recognise the shape of a hand but have a field of vision less than five degrees." The International Paralympic Committee defined this classification for alpine skiing as "From ability to recognise the shape of a hand up to a visual acuity of 2/60 and/or visual field of less than 5 degrees."

This classification has parallels in other sports. The comparative classification in adaptive rowing is LTA-B2. In equestrian, Grade 4 is equivalent to B2. The B2 equivalent for swimming is S12.

== Governance ==
IBSA handles classification for a number of sports internationally including five-a-side football, goalball and judo. Part of being classified involves assessing vision for factors including visual acuity, contrast sensitivity, color vision, motion detections and visual field. When being assessed into this class by the IBSA, the process first includes the athlete filling out a consent form, submitting a photograph, and scheduling an appointment with a classifier for evaluation. During the actual evaluation, the competitor may be accompanied by another person to assist them in communicating with the classifiers. If necessary, the person can also bring a translator. A medical assessment is then conducted. There are several status groups used by classifiers that assist in classification. This includes Confirmed for competitors who have a visual impairment unlikely to change, Review for competitors who have vision that may fluctuate, New for competitors who have never been classified before, Not Eligible for competitors who have a visual impairment that is not severe enough and not likely to deteriorate in the future to the point where they could be eligible.

Classification is also handled on a national and by sport level. Australians seeking classification for blind sports can be classified by an IBSA classifier or an Australian Paralympic Committee vision impairment classifier. In the United Kingdom, blind sport is handled by British Blind Sport, which is recognised nationally by Sport England. In the United States, governance related to this classification is handled by the United States Association for Blind Athletes (USABA).

Not all sports use IBSA classifiers. For adaptive rowing, classification assignment may be handled by the Fédération Internationale des Sociétés d'Aviron (FISA), cycling by the Union Cycliste Internationale (UCI), para-equestrian, by the Fédération Équestre Internationale (FEI). Swimming classification is handled by IPC Swimming, while in athletics, classification assignment for this class is handled by the IPC.

== History ==
This classification traces its history to the early history of blind sport. There was a belief that those with vision impairment that was less severe had a competitive advantage over competitors who had more severe impairment. Classification was developed by the IBSA to insure more even competition across the different bands of visual acuity. In 1976, the International Sports Organization for the Disabled (ISOD) developed a blind classification system. Parallel to this, IBSA and national blind sport associations were developing their own classification system, with the IBSA one based on visual acuity in place by 1980. The rise of the IBSA classification system for blind sport meant the ISOD classification system failed to gain traction in blind sports competition.

The IBSA classification system has largely remained unchanged since it was put in place, even as the International Paralympic Committee (IPC) attempted to move towards a more functional disability and evidence based system that does not rely on medical based classification. In 2003, the IPC made an attempt to address "the overall objective to support and co-ordinate the ongoing development of accurate, reliable, consistent and credible sport focused classification systems and their implementation." It approved the classification at the IPC General Assembly in 2007 as part of the overall blind class group, but was still medically based despite changes in other disability types. IBSA was not prepared at the time to move towards a more functional classification system similar to that utilized by other disability groups and sports.

In some cases, non-Paralympic, non-IBSA affiliated sports have developed their own classification systems. This is the case with blind golf, where a classification existed by 1990 and was used at the Australian Open Golf Tournament for the Blind and Visually Impaired. At that time, four classifications existed and were the same as the IBSA for this class.

In 1990, the Equestrian Federation of Australia did not have specific classifications for competitors with disabilities, including those with visual impairments. Acknowledging membership needs, some rules had organically developed that looked like classifications based on rule modification for different disability types, including blind riders. These included allowing blind riders, when they reached a marker, being given an auditory signal to inform them of this.

== Equipment ==
B2 classified Canadian skier Viviane Forest and guide Chloe Lauzon-Gauthier in action at the IPC Alpine World Championships in 2013

B2 classified Spanish skier Jon Santacana and guide Miguel Galindo in action at the IPC Alpine World Championships in 2013

Equipment utilized by competitors in this class may include sighted guides, guide rails, beeping balls and clap sticks. For blind archery, archers in this class use a tactile sighting device and must not be able to use a bow sight.

The use of a sighted guide by people in this class is dependent on the specific requirements of the sport. Guides are used in para-alpine and para-Nordic skiing. Guides for B2 and B3 skiers often position themselves differently from for B1 skiers as the skiers in this class have some vision, which means the things a guide assists with will be different from what is required of a skier who has almost no sight. The guide may ski in front of the skier and use visual cues to inform the skier of what is ahead of them on the course. For cyclists in this class, a guide is used with the guide sitting at the front of a tandem bicycle.

For S12 classified swimmers, a tapper may stand on the pool deck to tap the swimmer as they approach the wall. The swimmer has to bring their own tapper, but having a tapper is optional. In blind cricket, B2 batsmen have the option of having a runner.

== Rules ==
There are some rule differences for this class in competition that are sport-specific and which differ from able-bodied versions of the sport. In adaptive rowing's Coxed Four, LTA4+, the maximum number of vision-impaired rowers in a boat is two. In blind cricket, three players in this class are required to be on the field at the same out of the eleven total players on the pitch. B2 batsmen have the option of having a runner. In judo, all three blind sport classes compete against each other, with competitors classified by weight for the competition. Weight classes use the international standards used in the Olympics. In IBSA sailing competitions, the three-person boat can have a maximum of five points, and must include at least one female and one male sailor on the boat. In competitions run by Blind Sailing International, this class sometimes competes only against other boats where all the sailors are in this class.

== Sports ==
On the Paralympic level, several disability sports are not open to this classification or other visually impaired competitors including archery, basketball, boccia, curling, fencing, ice sledge hockey, powerlifting, rugby, shooting, table tennis, tennis,and volleyball. Five-a-side football is not open to women. Eligible Paralympic sports for this classification include adaptive rowing, athletics, cycling five-a-side football, goalball, judo, para-equestrian, para-alpine skiing, para-Nordic skiing, and swimming. This classification is not eligible to compete at the Paralympic Games in archery.

The classification is used in other sports including blind golf and lawn bowls. While this classification is open to five-a-side blind football, women are not eligible to compete at the Paralympic Games. This classification is eligible to play goalkeeper but in some competitions is not allowed to be a field player.

=== Athletics ===
The B2 classification is used in athletics, where the equivalent athletics classification is "T12". Athletes in this class can generally perceive the lines on the track. At the 2008 Summer Paralympics, classification assignment for this class was handled by the IPC.

==== Guides ====
In athletics, competitors have the option of using a guide. For field events such as the long jump or discus, a caller may be used. For runners in this class, using a guide is often a personal preference; some use guides only in practice, others only in competition, or both competition and practice, and some never use guides. When a runner is looking for a guide, they are encouraged to find one with a gait similar to their own, where a rope or tether may be used to connect the runner to the guide.

At the elite level, guides are treated the same as the blind runner. Guides and runners must both use blocks for any race shorter than 400 metres (440 yd). In 400-metre (440 yd) races, the guide runs on the right side of the runner. For races of 800 metres (870 yd) or longer, a runner may use up to two guides, but the course officials must be informed of any decision to use more than one guide in advance of the race. In the marathon, the runner may use up to four different guides. The runner must finish ahead of the guide. In running, the guide attempts to match the running pattern of the runner, not the other way around.

At the 2012 Summer Paralympics, sighted guides in athletics were awarded medals for the first time.
