= PR2 2x =

Paralympic rowing classification

PR2 2x (previously TA2x) is a Paralympic rowing classification. The classifications were developed and current as of March 2011. In 2017 the designation was changed from TA to PR2.

== Sport ==
This is a Paralympic rowing classification. In 2008, BBC Sport defined this classification was "TA2x: A two-person, mixed-gender scull for athletes with trunk and arm movement only." In 2008, the Australian Broadcasting Corporation defined this classification was "TA (Trunk and Arms): Competitors in this classification can fix their pelvis on the seat in the boat but are unable to use a sliding seat because of their loss of leg function."

== Becoming classified ==
Classification is handled by FISA – International Rowing Federation.

Australians seeking classification through Rowing Australia need to provide several documents to a classifier at the time of application, including a doctor's statement that documents their impairment, when it was acquired and if the doctor expects changes in the level of disability in terms of increases or decreases in the severity of the disability.

== See also ==
- Adaptive rowing
- Adaptive rowing classification
- Rowing at the 2008 Summer Paralympics
- Rowing at the 2012 Summer Paralympics
