= International Sports Promotion Society =

Japanese non-profit

- 国際スポーツ振興協会
- Abbreviation: ISPS, ISPS HANDA
- Formation: 2006
- Founder: Haruhisa Handa
- Type: Non-profit
- Purpose: To increase welfare through sports
- Headquarters: Tokyo, Japan
- Website: www.ispsgolf.com

International Sports Promotion Society (国際スポーツ振興協会, Kokusai Spōtsu Shinkō Kyoukai) (ISPS, also known as ISPS Handa) is a Japanese non-profit organization known for its sponsorship of golf tournaments worldwide, including the PGA Seniors Championship and LPGA Women's Australian Open. ISPS Handa is a member of the Tokyo Sports Association, a public-interest-incorporated foundation.

== History ==
- ISPS Handa was founded in 2006, establishing the “Handa Cup” in the US as well as the “Handa Australian Cup” in Australia to fund and support LPGA senior golf tournaments. It also began organizing amateur events such as the Handa Cup All-Japan Golf Tutors Pro-Am Open Championship.
- Since 2007, ISPS Handa has also supported bowling tournaments in Japan and has co-sanctioned the Handa Cup Japan Pro Bowling Championship and the Handa Cup All Japan Women's Pro Bowling Championship. It also began to establish and support tournaments for major international tours.
- Since 2010, ISPS Handa has been hosting championships in Japan, such as the JPGA Senior Tour and the JGTO Challenge Tournament, including the ISPS Handa Cup Senior Masters.
- In January 2012, ISPS Handa established the ISPS Handa PGA Academy Program in collaboration with the PGA European Tour, in which UK professional golfers provide instruction to blind golfers.
- In 2013, ISPS Handa organized the World Sports Values Summit for Peace in Tokyo.
- In July 2014, ISPS Handa started supporting Mpumalanga Black Aces F.C. in the Republic of South Africa.
- In June 2015, ISPS Handa founded the ISPS Handa Global Cup, its first hosting tournament in association with Japan Golf Tour Organization.

== Golf ==
ISPS Handa promotes disabled golf and blind golf and provides management and financial support to a number of tournaments in cooperation with the local golf associations worldwide.

There have been several tournaments organized titled “ISPS” as an abbreviation of International Sports Promotion Society, and “HANDA” which is the last name of Chairman Haruhisa Handa, as well as the combined title “ISPS HANDA”. ISPS Handa became the title sponsor for the 2013 Golf World Cup, resulting in the official title of the tournament as “ISPS Handa World Cup Golf”.

The 6th PGA Handa Cup Philanthropy Senior Tournament (organized by The Professional Golfers’ Association of Japan), had total prize money 5 times higher than the previous year's (2006 The 5th PGA Philanthropy Rebornest Senior Open), becoming the first “Total Prize Money 100,000,000 yen Tournament” in the history of the PGA Senior Tour. Since its 11th event in 2012, this Tournament has been conducted by ISPS, and the 2014 event was entitled as the “ISPS Handa Cup Philanthropy Senior Tournament”.

The ISPS Handa Global Cup (Japan Golf Tour Organization), launched in June 2015, was broadcast overseas as a golf program with a commentator in English for the first time in the golf history of Japan. Besides the TV broadcast, the program was also distributed online through Ustream. The winner received as a prize a Japanese green Haori, instead of the green jacket.

=== Current ISPS Handa events ===
| Tour | Tournament | Year | Location |
|---|---|---|---|
| ALPG Tour; Ladies European Tour | ISPS Handa New Zealand Women's Open | 2012–present | New Zealand |
| ALPG Tour, LET, LPGA Tour | ISPS Handa Women's Australian Open | 2010–present | Australia |
| PGA Tour of Australasia | BMW ISPS Handa New Zealand Open | 2016–present | New Zealand |
| N/A | The Masters Media Dinner | 2013–present | United States |
| N/A | The ISPS Handa Mike Tindall 3rd Annual Celebrity Golf Classic | 2013–present | England |
| European Seniors Tour | ISPS Handa PGA Seniors Championship | 2012–present | England |
| Japan Golf Tour | ISPS Handa Global Cup | 2015–present | Japan |
| Ladies European Tour | ISPS Handa Ladies European Masters | 2012–present | England |
| Legends Tour | ISPS Handa Cup | 2006–present | United States |
| N/A | Duke of York Young Champions Trophy | 2011–present | United Kingdom |
| IBGA | ISPS Handa World Blind Golf Championship | 2014–present | Worldwide |
| IBGA | ISPS Handa Australian Blind Golf Open | 2014–present | Australia |
| IBGA | ISPS Handa Austrian Blind Golf Open | 2014–present | Austria |
| IBGA | ISPS Handa British Blind Golf Open | 2014–present | Great Britain |
| IBGA | ISPS Handa Ressmeyer Cup | 2014–present | Italy |
| IBGA | ISPS Handa Canadian Blind Golf Open | 2014–present | Canada |
| IBGA | ISPS Handa US Blind Golf Open | 2014–present | United States |
| IBGA | ISPS Handa South African Open | 2014–present | South Africa |
| IBGA | ISPS Handa Italian Blind Open | 2014–present | Italy |

=== Past ISPS Handa events ===
| Tour | Tournament | Year | Country |
|---|---|---|---|
| PGA Tour | ISPS Handa World Cup of Golf | 2013 | Australia |
| LPGA Tour; Ladies European Tour | Solheim Cup | 2013 | United States |
| Japan High School Golf Association; South Korea School Golf Association | Handa Cup Japan-South Korea Junior Championship | 2010–2014 | Japan |
| JPGA | ISPS Handa Cup Philanthropy Senior Tournament | 2007–2014 | Japan |
| European Tour | ISPS Handa Wales Open | 2012–2014 | Wales |
| European Tour; PGA Tour of Australasia | ISPS Handa Perth International | 2012–2014 | Japan |
| Sunshine Tour; European Tour | The Nelson Mandela Championship | 2012-2013 | South Africa |
| Asian Tour | Faldo Series Asia | 2013–2014 | Asia |
| Asian Tour | Handa Faldo Cambodian Classic (Faldo Series Asia) | 2012 | Cambodia |
| PGA Tour | Tavistock Cup | 2013 | United States |
| Ladies European Tour | Aberdeen Asset Management Ladies Scottish Open | 2013 | Scotland |
| Legends Tour | ISPS Handa Legend's Tour Open Championship | 2007–2012 | Australia |
| Golf Australia | Handa Australian Senior Open | 2007–2012 | Australia |
| European Seniors Tour | Handa Irish Senior Open | 2010 | Ireland |
| Asian Tour | ISPS Handa Singapore Classic | 2007 | Singapore |
| JFOS, ISPS | Handa Cup Japan golf leader Professional-amateur open | 2006–2014 | Japan |
| ISPS | ISPS Handa Heroes | 2012–2014 | United States |
| Faldo Series | Faldo Series USA Grand Final | 2013–2014 | United States |
| ISPS | ISPS Handa Cup Senior Masters | 2010–2011 | Japan |
| ALPG Tour | ISPS Handa Australia Cup | 2006–2011 | Australia |
| ISPS | ISPS Charity Challenge Tournament | 2013 | Japan |
| ISPS | ISPS Glowing Senior Open | 2012 | Japan |
| ISPS | Handa Cup Senior Championship | 2007, 2009 | Japan |
| ISPS | Handa Cup Tournament | 2010 | Japan |
| ISPS | Handa Cup Tournament Under 30〜 | 2010 | Japan |
| Golf Australia | Handa Junior Masters | 2009, 2011 | Australia |
| 中国高尔夫球协会 | Handa Cup Philanthropy in China CGA Challenge Tour | 2010 | China |
| JFOS | Handa Cup International | 2009 | China |

== Summit ==
ISPS co-sanctioned the World Sports Values Summit for Peace in Tokyo, which was held on July 18–19, 2013. Top athletes and researchers came together from 16 countries around the world to discuss the topic “Sports can contribute to harmonizing the development of humanity and establishing and encouraging a peaceful society.”

At the World Sports Values Summit for Peace and Development, held on May 23–24, 2014 at the United Nations Headquarters in New York City, a partnership between ISPS and the United Nations Alliance of Civilizations (UNAOC) was announced.

== Japan bowling ==
In Japan, ISPS supports bowling, hosting national tournaments throughout the year. In Japan, roughly 20% of the population bowls, compared with the 13.8% who play golf. However, the number of bowling alleys has decreased from 3,000 to 1,000. With the support of the ISPS, a number of bowling events have been held, and the professionalism of the sport has improved.

| Operated | Co-Sanctioned | Title | Year |
|---|---|---|---|
| Japan Professional Bowling Association | ISPS | Handa Cup Japan Pro Bowling Championship | 2007–present |
| Japan Professional Bowling Association | ISPS | Handa Cup All Japan Women's Pro Bowling Championship | 2007–present |
| Japan Professional Bowling Association | ISPS | Handa Cup Senior Ladies Pro Bowling Tournaments in Japan | 2008–present |
| Japan Professional Bowling Association | ISPS | Handa Cup Philanthropy Pro Bowling Tournaments in Japan | 2009–present |
| Japan Professional Bowling Association | ISPS | Handa Cup Philanthropy Ladies Professional Bowling Tournaments in Japan | 2009–present |
| Japan Professional Bowling Association | ISPS | Handa Cup Pro Bowling Masters in Japan | 2010–present |
| Japan Ladies Bowling Club | ISPS | Handa Cup Platinum Ladies Bowling Tournaments in Japan | 2009–present |

== Organization ==
Founder and Chairman

- Haruhisa Handa

Honorary Chairman

- George Carey

Director

- Shinichiro Kurimoto

Affiliation pro

Golfers

- Hideto Tanihara
- Yoshinori Fujimoto
- Akihito Yokoyama
- Miki Sakai
- Satoshi Nakayama
- Akira Kobayashi

Ambassadors

- Laura Davies
- Lydia Ko
- Kathy Whitworth
- Jan Stephenson
- Yoshinori Fujimoto
- Miki Sakai

== See also ==
- International Blind Golf Association
