= Hendrik Hofmeyr =

South African composer (born 1957)

- Born: Hendrik Pienaar Hofmeyr; 20 November 1957 (age 68); Cape Town, Cape Province, Union of South Africa
- Genres: Opera, contemporary classical music
- Occupation: Composer

Hendrik Pienaar Hofmeyr (born 20 November 1957) is a South African composer. Born in Cape Town, he studied at the South African College of Music at the University of Cape Town, obtaining a BMus in 1979 and an MMus in 1991. He furthered his studies in Italy during 10 years of self-imposed exile as a conscientious objector, obtaining State Diplomas in Piano (Florence), Composition (Bologna) and Conducting (Florence) While there, he was awarded the Zucchelli Prize for Composition at the Bologna Conservatorio two years running and also won the South African Opera Competition with The Fall of the House of Usher. He also received the annual Nederburg Prize for Opera for this work subsequent to its performance at the State Theatre in Pretoria in 1988. In the same year, he obtained first prize in an international competition in Italy with music for a short film by Wim Wenders. He returned to South Africa in 1992, taking up a post as lecturer at the University of Stellenbosch. In 1997, he won two major international composition competitions, the Queen Elisabeth Music Competition of Belgium (with 'Raptus' for violin and orchestra) and the first edition of the Dimitris Mitropoulos Competition in Athens (with 'Byzantium' for high voice and orchestra). He returned to his alma mater as senior lecturer in 1998, obtaining a DMus there in 1999. and retiring as Professor and Head of Composition and Theory in 2022. His 'Incantesimo' for solo flute was selected to represent South Africa at the ISCM World Music Days in Croatia in 2005. In 2008 he was honoured with a Kanna award by the Kleinkaroo National Arts Festival. He received the UCT Creative Arts Award for his Second Symphony – The Elements in 2018. Hofmeyr’s oeuvre, which comprises operas, orchestral, choral, vocal and instrumental works, includes some 150 commissions. Many of his works have been published abroad and issued on CD. In 2021, Partita africana, a CD of his works, was chosen as Discovery of the Month by the French magazine Classica; in 2023, another CD featuring three of his works was selected as Contemporary CD of the Week on Radio France. Hofmeyr was awarded the prestigious triennial Hubert Rupert Prize for Classical Music in 2025 by the South African Academy of Science and Art for his contribution to music.

== Works ==
=== Stage ===
- The Fall of the House of Usher (1-act chamber opera, libretto by the composer, after Edgar Allan Poe), lyric soprano, 1–2 tenors, bass-baritone, flute (+ piccolo, alto flute), oboe (+ English horn), clarinet (+ bass clarinet), bassoon, French horn, 2 percussion, harp, violin, viola, cello, double bass, 1987
- Vala – A Metaphysical Ballet (scenario by the composer, after William Blake), large orchestra, 1989
- The Land of Heart's Desire (1-act chamber opera, libretto by the composer, after William Butler Yeats), soprano leggero, lyric soprano, mezzo-soprano, tenor, baritone, bass, flute (+ piccolo, alto flute), oboe (+ English horn), clarinet (+ bass clarinet), bassoon, French horn, 2 percussion, harp, 2 violins, viola, cello, double bass, 1989 (rev. 2010)
- Alice (3-act ballet, scenario by the composer, after Lewis Carroll), large orchestra, 1990–91 (a suite was arranged; also versions of Tango for 3 clarinets, 3 violins, cello, piano 4 hands and violin, viola, cello, piano; versions of some sections for 2 pianos)
- Lumukanda (3-act opera, libretto by the composer, after Credo Mutwa), 4 sopranos, 3 mezzo-sopranos, alto, 3 tenors, baritone, 2 basses, mixed chorus, large orchestra, 1993–96
- Die Laaste Aand (1-act chamber opera, libretto by the composer, after C.L. Leipoldt), lyric soprano, tenor, 2 baritones, 2 basses, flute, oboe (+ English horn), clarinet (+ bass clarinet), bassoon (+ contrabassoon), French horn, percussion, string quartet, double bass, 2001
- Saartjie (1-act monodrama, libretto by the composer), soprano, off-stage chorus, flute (+ piccolo), oboe (+ English horn), clarinet (+ bass clarinet), bassoon (+ contrabassoon), French horn, trumpet, trombone, timpani, 2 percussion, strings (3.3.3.2.2), 2009
- Hemp van vlam (1-act monodrama, on poems by Sheila Cussons), soprano, clarinet, piano, 2017
- Sara Baartman (3-act opera, libretto by the composer), soprano, mezzo-soprano, 2 tenors, 2 baritones, bass, chorus, flute (+ piccolo), oboe (+ English horn), clarinet (+ bass clarinet), bassoon (+ contrabassoon), French horn, trumpet, trombone, timpani, 2 percussion, harp, strings (3.3.3.2.2), 2019

=== Orchestral ===
- Immagini da 'Il cielo sopra Berlino', small orchestra (21 players), 1988
- Alice, large orchestra, 1996 (suite from ballet)
- Raptus, violin, orchestra, 1997
- Ingoma, 1998
- Apocalypsis, large orchestra, 1998
- Concerto per pianoforte e orchestra, 1999
- Concerto per flauto e orchestra, 1999
- Simulacrum, large orchestra, 2000
- Umkulo Wemvula (Rainmusic), 2001
- Concerto for Flute, Violin and String orchestra, 2002
- Concerto for Two Pianos and Orchestra, 2004
- Concerto for Cello and Orchestra, 2006
- Partita africana (comprising Preludio, Umsindo and Ingoma) 2007
- Concerto for Alto Saxophone and Orchestra, 2010
- Concerto for Baritone Saxophone and Orchestra, 2010
- Kasi – An Introduction to the Orchestra, 2011
- Concerto for Clarinet and Orchestra, 2012
- Concerto for Flute, Harp and String Orchestra, 2012 (also version for flute, harp and string quintet, 2012)
- Concerto for Recorder, String Orchestra and Harpsichord, 2012
- Concerto for Bassoon and Orchestra, 2014
- Concerto for Recorder, Harpsichord and Orchestra, 2016
- Concerto for Marimba and String Orchestra, 2016
- Symphony II - The Elements, 2017
- Autumn Concerto for bassoon and orchestra, 2019
- Concerto for Oboe, Strings and Percussion, 2021
- Concerto for Tenor Saxophone and Orchestra, 2023
- Concerto for Guitar and Chamber Orchestra, 2023
- Concerto for Soprano Saxophone and Orchestra, 2024
- Valedictione, 2025
- Concerto for Two Pianos and String Orchestra, 2026

=== Chamber music ===
- Wonderland Suite, oboe, piano, 1977
- Cavatina, flute, piano, 1980
- Partita canonica, clarinet, 1983
- Die Lied van Juanita Perreira, cello, piano, 1985
- Cadenza, cello, 1994
- Incantesimo, flute, 1996 (also version for tenor recorder, 2002)
- Nelle mani d'Amduscias, violin, 1996
- Notturno elegiaco, harp, 1996 (also versions for flute, cello, piano, 1998; violin, cello, piano, 2003)
- Tango, 3 clarinets, 3 violins, cello, piano 4 hands, 1997 (version of section of Alice; also versions for violin, viola, cello, piano, 2003; for 6 cellos, 2003)
- First String Quartet, 1998
- Ingoma for 4 recorders, 2000 (also versions for string quartet, 2010; 4 flutes, 2014; 4 violas, 2014)
- Luamerava, violin, 2000
- Marimba, flute, 2000
- Scherzetto, alto recorder, 2000
- Luanaledi, alto recorder (+ tenor recorder), 2001
- Partita contrappuntistica, viola, 2001 (also versions for violin, cello, 2021)
- Il poeta e l'usignolo, flute, guitar, 2004 (also version for flute, harp, 2005)
- Amar(tan)go, cello, double bass, 2004 (also versions for cello, piano, 2005; double bass, piano, 2005; violin, piano, 2009; viola, piano, 2020; alto saxophone, piano, 2021)
- Crucifixus, cello, organ, 2004
- Variations on a Chorale, flute, organ, 2005
- Second String Quartet, 2006
- Sonata for horn and piano, 2006
- Sonata for flute and piano, 2006 (also version for violin, piano, 2008)
- Variations on an African Lullaby, violin (or flute or cello), 2007
- Lachrymae, guitar, 2007
- Rapsodia notturna, guitar, piano, 2007
- Endymion and the Moon, violin, harp, 2008
- Trio, violin, cello, piano, 2008
- Sonata I for violin and piano, 2008
- It takes two..., flute, cello, piano, 2009 (also versions for clarinet, cello, piano, 2018; flute, violin, piano, 2018; clarinet, violin, piano, 2018; clarinet bass trombone, piano, 2018; trumpet, tenor trombone, piano, 2018; clarinet, viola, piano, 2024; flute, clarinet, piano, 2025)
- Il giardino delle Esperidi, 5 flutes, alto flute, bass flute, 2009
- Lied van die Somerwind (Song of the Summer Wind), flute, violin, 2009
- Canto notturno, clarinet piano, 2010
- Mabalêl – Fantasia on the poem by Eugène Marais, flute, piano, 2010
- Trio, flute (or violin), clarinet (or viola or cello), piano, 2010
- Tango languido, lever harp, 2010
- Umlolozelo, guitar, 2010
- Hartbreekrivier and Umsindo, vibraphone, marimba, 2010
- Trio II, flute (violin), clarinet (viola/cello), piano, 2011
- Elegia, flute, harp, 2011
- 5 Chorale Preludes, organ, 2011
- Diablerie, viola, guitar, 2012
- Concerto for Flute, Harp & String Quintet, 2012
- Sonata for Clarinet and Piano, 2013
- Sonata for Cello and Piano, 2013
- Fiaba 2 flutes and marimba, 2015 (also version for flute, violin and marimba, 2018)
- Ludzimu – Trio for violin, bassoon and piano, 2015
- Quintet for Clarinet and Strings, 2015
- Mokete (Celebration), 6 percussionists, 2015
- Three Pieces for Flute and Piano, 2016
- Sonata for Vibraphone and Marimba, 2016
- Sonata for Viola and Piano, 2017
- Divertimento, flute and string trio, 2017
- Concerto for Piano & 7 Instruments, 2017
- Sonata for Double Bass and Piano – Naka ya lethlaka, 2017
- Necromancer for alto saxophone, piano, 2018
- Sonata for Trombone and Piano, 2018
- Sonata for Two Guitars, 2019
- Sonata for Vibraphone and Piano, 2019
- Gilgamesh weeps for Enkidu, duduk, flute, viola, harp, 2020
- Saint Francis and the birds, flute, clarinet, alto saxophone, horn, bassoon, 2021
- Three dances, oboe, soprano saxophone, clarinet, bass clarinet, bassoon, 2025
- The rebirth of Noliyanda, 2021
- Kalembe – Wizard-Lord of the Wakambi, 2021
- Kemet, alto saxophone, piano, 2023
- Wupperthal, 2023
- Daphnis and Pan, flute, bassoon, 2025
- Legenda, 2 flutes, alto flute, 2025
- Quartet for Violin, Viola, Cello and Piano, 2025
- Des ténèbres (Uit donker dieptes), organ, 2026

=== Piano ===
- Nag, 1981–83
- Die Dans van die Reën, 1985
- Four Pieces from Alice, 2 pianos, 1998 (version of music from the ballet)
- Chaconne, 1999
- The Four-Note Waltz, 2 pianos, 2000
- Toccata, 2001
- Variations on a Mazurka of Chopin, 2002
- Notturno, 2003
- Sonata for Two Pianos, 2004
- March of the Lilliputians, 2006
- Partita africana (Preludio, Umsindo, River of Sorrow, Kalunga), 1999–2006
- Preludio, 2011
- Sonata, 2011
- Variations on an African lullaby, 2011
- Ballata africana, 2014
- Homecoming, 2015
- Fantasia sopra Senzeni na, 2016
- Partita romantica (Prelude, Etude, Nocturne, Elegie), 2018
- Rumba congolaise, 2024
- Passacaglia on the name of James May, 2024
- Postcard Preludes, 2025
- Dragonfly, 2026

=== Choral ===
- Liederwysgesange (text by Boerneef), mixed choir, piano, 1983
- Sound the Flute! (text by William Blake), mixed choir, piano, 1985–86
- Sweet was the Song (text by John Attey), mixed choir, 1986 (also version for children's/female chorus, 2001)
- Care-Charmer Sleep (text by Samuel Daniel), 5 mixed voices, 1987
- Missa Sancti Ignatii de Loyola, soprano, chorus, 1988
- Requiem, soprano, alto, tenor, bass, mixed choir, 1975–93
- Kersliedjie (text by D. J. Opperman), mixed chorus, orchestra, 1995 (also versions for female/mixed chorus, piano, 2002; female chorus, 2003)
- Par les sentiers de lumière (text by Lamine Diakhaté), mixed choir, 1996
- Iubilate Deo, mixed choir, 1997
- Die Spokewals (text by Boerneef), mixed choir, 1998 (also version for 8 male voices, 2004)
- Eden (text by Ida Rousseau), equal voices, 1999
- Tu pauperum refugium (texts from the Bible, Latin liturgy), double treble choir, audience, 2000 (also version for double mixed choir, audience, 2001)
- Stabat Mater, mixed choir, 2000 (also version for SSAATTBB, oboe d'amore, strings, 2024)
- Pie Jesu, mixed choir, 2001
- A sexta autem hora (text from the Bible), mixed choir, 2001
- The Eccho (text by Richard Leigh), 6 mixed voices, 2001
- How sweet the moonlight (text by William Shakespeare), girls' voices (SSSSAAAA), 2001
- De profundis, male chorus, 2001
- Afrika (text by C. M. van den Heever), mixed choir, 2001
- My venster is 'n blanke vlak (text by N.P. Van Wyk Louw), soprano, mixed choir, 2002
- Nunc dimittis, mixed choir, 2002
- Hodie Christus natus est, equal voices, 2002 (also versions for treble choir, mixed choir, 2003; mixed choir, 2003)
- Ek wonder of jy soms (text by I.P. Du Plessis), mixed choir, 2002
- Super flumina Babylonis (text from Psalm 137), mixed choir, 2002
- Sedoosmusiek (text by Boerneef), mixed choir, 2003
- Die Here is my herder (text from Psalm 23 [Afrikaans translation]), mixed choir, 2003
- The Healing Prayer (text by Elizabeth Peter-Ross), mixed chorus, audience, 14 strings, 2003 (also shorter version for mixed chorus, audience/congregation, organ, 2003)
- Sinfonia africana (texts by Eugène N. Marais, D. J. Opperman, C. M. van den Heever), soprano, mixed chorus, orchestra, 2003
- A Carol Cantata (texts from the carols "Hodie Christus natus est" and "I Sing of a Maiden", John Attey, D. J. Opperman [English translation]), soprano, mixed chorus, string orchestra, 2004
- Die Dans van die Reën (text by Eugène N. Marais), mixed choir, 2004
- Winternag (text by Eugène Marais), mixed choir, 2005
- Psalm 103 (text from Psalm 103 [Afrikaans translation]), mixed choir, 2006
- Lawaaimusiek (text by Boerneef), mixed choir, 2006
- By jonasdrif se sekelgat (text by Boerneef), mixed choir, 2006
- Batter my heart (text by John Donne), mixed choir, 2007
- The Birth of Orc (text from "The Four Zoas" by William Blake), mixed choir, 2007
- Mabalêl (text by Eugène Marais), children's or women's choir, 2007
- Saulus in Damascum (text from Acts of the Apostles), mixed choir, 2007
- Desert Sun (text by the composer, based on Bushman legends), mixed choir, 2007
- In lumine tuo (text from Latin liturgy), mixed choir, 2007
- Lied van !Kò (text by the composer, based on Bushman songs), mixed choir, 2007
- Rut (text from the Bible), treble choir, 2008
- Kaljanner kaljanner (text by George Weideman), treble choir, 2008
- Genesis (text from the Bible), mixed choir, 2009
- Horie petryse ennie fisane (text by Boerneef), children's or women's choir (SSSAAA), 2010
- Psalm 148 (text from the Bible), mixed choir, 2010
- Kom ons prys die Heer se naam (text by the composer), SSA (or TBB), piano, 2010
- Gloria (text from Latin liturgy), mixed choir, 2010
- Wynverse (text by Hennie van Coller), SATB, pf, 2010
- Kom ons prys die Heer se naam (text by the composer), SSA (or TBB), pf, 2010
- Jankemalanke Langklaasfranke (text by Boerneef), equal voices, 2011
- Juig, al wat leef (text from Psalm 100 [Afrikaans translation]), equal voices, piano, 2011
- Bont konsertina laans die watervoor (text by Boerneef), mixed choir, 2011 (also version for mixed chorus, piano, 2012)
- A Song for St. Cecilia's Day (text by John Dryden), mixed choir, 2012
- Magnificat (text from Latin liturgy), mixed choir, 2012
- Bont konsertina laans die watervoor (text by Boerneef), SATB, pf, 2012
- Die Lied van die Skepping (The Song of Creation) (text from the Bible), SATB, pf, 2012
- Psalm 42 (Afrikaans/English text from the Bible), SSA (or TBB), 2014 (also version for SATB, piano, 2016)
- Pater noster (text from the Bible), SSAATTBB, 2014
- Spring (text by William Blake) from Sound the Flute!, SATB, xyl, 2014
- Laudate Dominum (text from Latin liturgy), SSAA (or TTBB), 2014
- Ken jy die see (text by Uys Krige), SSAATTBB, 20154
- Omnia tempus habent (text from the Bible), SSAATTBB, 2015
- Of Darkness and the Heart (text by Fiona Zerbst), SA, pf, 2015
- Nocturne (text by Elisabeth Eybers), SA (or TB), pf, 2015
- Gedig vir Klein Estie (text by Wilhelm Knobel), SA (or TB), pf, 2015
- By die dood van Motau (text by Wilhelm Knobel), SA (or TB), pf, 2015
- Op slag gedood (text by Wilhelm Knobel), SSA (or TBB), pf, 2015
- Miserere super Senzeni na (text from Latin liturgy), SSATTB (with S solo), 2015
- Koshuis-aandete (text by Lina Spies), 3 equal voices, pf, 2015
- Tweespalt (text by Lina Spies), 2/3 equal voices, pf, 2015
- Shall I compare thee to a Summer's day? (text by Shakespeare), SA (or TB), pf, 2015
- I sing of a maiden (adaptation of Old English text), SSAA (or TTBB), pf duet (or pf), 2016
- Agnus Dei super Bawo xa ndi lah le ke yo (text from Latin liturgy), SATB (with S and A solo), 2015
- In tempore belli (text from the Bible), SATB (with S and A solo), 2016
- Koeloekoeloe (text by Boerneef), SATB, 2016
- Die blye boodskap (text from the Bible), SATB, (with S solo), pf, 2016
- The Bells (text by Edgar Allan Poe), SATB, pf, 2017
- Abraham and Isaac (text from the Bible), SATB, 2017 5
- O come, o come, Emmanuel – carol fantasia (traditional), SATB, 2018
- Salve, Regina (text from Latin liturgy), SSAATTBB, 2018
- The wicked are like the troubled sea (text from the Bible), SATB, 2019
- Eva en die wind (text by Sheila Cussons), SSAA, 2019
- You spotted snakes (text by Shakespeare), SSSAAA, 2019
- No man is an island (text by John Donne), SSAATTBB, 2020
- Windliedjie (text by Ingrid Jonker), SSAA, 2021
- Love (from 1 Corinthians 13), SSATBB, 2022
- Good King Wenceslas, SSAATTBB, 2022
- Twee liedere van //Kabbo, SATB, 2023
- Danza màcabra [available in English as Danse macabre] (text adapted from Arthur Rimbaud), SSAATTBB, 2023
- Hooglied, SSAATTBB, piano, 2023
- In lumine tuo, SSAA, 2024
- The starry call, S solo (and/or whistling), SSAATTB, 2024
- ’n Stellenbosse Liedjie (text by Dalina Kotze), SSATBB, 2025

=== Vocal ===
- Music, when soft voices die... (text by Percy Bysshe Shelley), high/medium voice, piano, 1983 (also version for high/medium voice, violin, viola, cello, 1994)
- Tre liriche in stilo antico (texts by Giacomo Leopardi, Torquato Tasso, Giuseppe Ungaretti), high voice, piano, 1982—84 (also version for high voice, violin, piano, 2012)
- Quiete and L'infinitofrom Tre liriche in stilo antico, versions for medium voice, cello, piano, 2000; voice, clarinet, piano, 2003)
- Drie Gedigte van Elisabeth Eybers, mezzo-soprano/alto, piano, 1977–85
- Twee Gedigte van Eugène Marais, high voice, piano, 1978–85
- Of Innocence and Experience (text by William Blake), high voice, piano, 1982–85
- Tre canzoni (texts by Michelangelo Buonarroti, Giosuè Carducci, Enrico Panzacchi), high/medium voice, piano, 1983–85
- Two Songs of Mervyn Peake, high/medium voice, piano, 1985
- The Death of Cleopatra (text by William Shakespeare), soprano, flute, alto flute, bass clarinet, French horn, harp, viola, double bass, vibraphone, 1986 (also version for soprano, clarinet, viola, piano, 2004; for soprano, string quartet, 2014)
- Alleenstryd/Outcast (text by S.V. Petersen), voice, piano, 1996; Fragment from 'Prometheus Unbound' (text by Percy Bysshe Shelley), high voice, flute, clarinet, French horn, harp/piano, violin, viola, cello, vibraphone, marimba, 1996
- Le bateau ivre (text by Arthur Rimbaud), medium/low voice, flute, French horn, harp, cello, vibraphone (+ tam-tam), 1996
- Byzantium (text by William Butler Yeats), soprano/mezzo-soprano/tenor, orchestra, 1997
- Of Darkness and the Heart (text by Fiona Zerbst), lyric soprano/mezzo-soprano, orchestra, 1999 (also versions for soprano, piano, 2002; soprano, string quartet, 2005)
- Hotel from Of darkness and the Heart(text by Fiona Zerbst), mezzo-soprano, viola, piano (also versions for soprano, trumpet, piano, 2011; soprano, flute, piano, 2015)
- Ballade van die Bloeddorstige Jagter/Ballad of the Blood-thirsty Hunter (text by G.A. Watermeyer), soprano, mezzo-soprano, tenor, baritone, bass, 24 strings, 2000
- Gebed om die Gebeente (text by D.J. Opperman), soprano/high mezzo-soprano, flute, cello, piano, 2000
- Due sonetti di Petrarca, high voice, soprano recorder/flute, cello, harpsichord/piano, 2000
- Psalm 23, soprano/mezzo-soprano/tenor, cello, 2000 (also choral version as Die Here is my herder)
- Ainsi qu'on oit le cerf bruire (text from Psalm 42 [translated by Louis Bourgeois]), high voice, flute, cello, piano, 2002 (also version with harpsichord instead of piano, 2004)
- Oda à la bella desnuda (text by Pablo Neruda), soprano/tenor, cello, 2002
- Die stil avontuur/The quiet adventure (song-cycle, text7 poems of Elisabeth Eybers [also version in English translation]), soprano, piano, 2003 (also version for mezzo-soprano, piano, 2004)
- Vier Gebede by Jaargetye in die Boland/Four Seasonal Prayers (text by N.P. Van Wyk Louw), voice, piano, 2004
- Nocturne (text by William Shakespeare), mezzo-soprano, baritone, piano, 2004 (also version for soprano, baritone, pfiano duet, 2017)
- en skielik is dit aand (5 poems by Wilhelm Knobel), voice, piano, 2005
- Ode to the West Wind (text by Percy Bysshe Shelley), high voice, orchestra, 2006
- Dover Beach (text by Matthew Arnold), high voice, flute, cello, piano, 2007 (also version for high voice, flute, cello, harp, 2014)
- Wynverse/Wine Songs (song-cycle, text by Hennie van Coller), high/medium voice, piano, 2009 (also versions for high voice, trumpet, piano, 2012; high voice, flute, piano, 2015)
- Die moeder/The mother (text by Elisabeth Eybers), soprano/mezzo, piano, 2009
- Ek maak 'n hek oop in my hart/A gateway to the heart (5 poems of Uys Krige), high/medium voice, piano, 2010
- Place me like a seal upon your heart (text from the Bible), soprano, bass, flute, organ, 2010
- Geluk (text by Uys Krige), voice, piano, 2011
- Diptych (texts by Pablo Neruda and Constantine Cavafy), high voice, flute, clarinet, string quartet, piano, 2011
- Die skaduwee van die son/The shadow of the sun (6 poems of Lina Spies), Hhigh/medium voice, piano, 2013
- Three Shakespeare sonnets, high/medium voice, piano, 2014
- Vroeë liefde/Early love (6 poems of Wilhelm Knobel), high/medium voice, piano, 2015
- Maria (text by Wilhelm Knobel), Medium voice, cello, 2015
- Van vlam en as/Of flame and ashes (11 poems of Sheila Cussons), High voice, clarinet, piano, 2016)
- Die onverganklike oomblik/The immortal moment (6 poems of NP Van Wyk Louw), high/medium voice, piano, 2016
- Sononder en die lug is pranasgeel (text by Boerneef), 3/4 voices, piano (or piano duet), 2017
- Wintersprokie/A winters tale (3 poems of Petra Müller), soprano/mezzo-soprano, piano, 2017
- The broken string (Xaa-ting, adapted by the composer), high/medium/low voice, piano, 2017
- Eurydike (text by Rainer Maria Rilke), S (also frame drum), harp, 2018 (also version for S, piano, 2018)
- Die junge Magd (Georg Trakl), high/medium/low voice, piano, 2020 14:45
- Attis, sopranista/soprano/tenor, alto saxophone/English horn, percussion, strings, 2020
- Woorde in die wind (Ingrid Jonker), Soprano/mezzo-soprano, piano, 2021
- Maye, maye high/medium/low voice, strings/piano, 2023
- Sewe gedigte van Thomas Erlank, medium voice, string quartet/piano, 2024
- Aan de Muziek [Aan die Musiek] (Roland Holst), high/medium voice, piano, 2024
- Sewe studies op gedigte van Breyten Breytenbach, high/medium voice, piano, 2025

=== Arrangements ===
- Uqongqot'hwane (Xhosa traditional), mixed chorus, soprano solo, 1995 (also versions for SSSAA, soprano solo, 2017; for TTBB, tenor solo, 2017)
- Thula, babana (Xhosa traditional), children's/female chorus, 1999 (also version for mixed chorus, 2000)
- Ma, daar kom die jong soldaat (Afrikaans traditional), female chorus, 2001
- Dubula (Xhosa traditional), mixed chorus, 2003
- Three African Songs, contralto, chamber orchestra, 2005
- Al lê die berge nog so blou (Afrikaans traditional), mixed chorus, violin, 2009 (also version for SATB, 2024)
- Vaarwel my eie soetelief (Afrikaans traditional), mixed chorus, 2009 (also versions for SSA/TBB, piano, 2015; for SSAA/TTBB, 2016)
- Daar kom die Alibama (Afrikaans traditional), mixed chorus, 2009
- Thula, thu (Xhosa traditional), soprano, piano, 2011 (also version for soprano, marimba, 2014)
- 6 Chorales, SATB and (/or) organ, 2011–13
- Senzeni na (traditional), SSATTB (with soprano solo), 2015
- Weggaan en terugkoms (traditional), SSAA (or TTBB), 2019
- Al lê die berge nog so blou (Afrikaans traditional), 2024

== Discography ==
- Immagini da 'Il cielo sopra Berlino'. Orchestra Musica '900, Maurizio Dino Ciacci, (conductor). Concorso Internazionale di Composizione Trento Cinema – La Colonna Sonora. Ricordi: SMRL 6396, 1988
- Raptus. Andrew Haveron (violin), Koninklijke Filharmonie van Vlaanderen, Marc Soustrot (conductor). Concours Musical International Reine Elisabeth de Belgique 1997. Cyprès: CYP 9306, 1997
- Spring. Tygerberg Koor, Linda Claassen (conductor). Voces Canorae 1998. Cape Town: 1998
- Kalunga. Ju Jin (piano). Ninth Unisa International Piano Competition. BMG Records Africa: CDCLA [LF] 003, 2000
- Chaconne. Grethe Nöthling (piano). Hennie Joubert Pianoforte Competition 2000. Muzik Front, 2000
- Die Spokewals; Uqongqot'hwane; Thula, babana. Pro Cantu, André van der Merwe (conductor). Pro Cantu 2000. Cape Town, 2000
- Incantesimo. Merryl Neille (flute). University of Pretoria Music Department 2001. CSO502, 2001
- Tu pauperum refugium. Tygerberg Children's Choir, Odawara Children's Choir, Moram Choir, Newfoundland Youth Symphony Choir, Hennie Loock (conductor). The World of Children’s Choirs: SongBridge 2001 Concert. Vancouver: 2001
- Tu pauperum refugium. Tygerberg Children's Choir, Odawara Children's Choir, Moram Choir, Newfoundland Youth Symphony Choir, Hennie Loock (conductor). Eternity. Cape Town: 2002
- Pie Jesu. SA College of Music Choir, Leon Starker (conductor). Glimpses of music in Africa. Pasmae: CDPASMAE001, 2002
- A sexta autem hora. University of Pretoria Camerata, Johann van der Sandt (conductor). South African Choral Music I: Horizons. Prospect Tonstudio: GEMA 00122, 2002
- Ainsi qu'on oit le cerf bruire; Requiem (excerpts). Sanet Allen, Marianne Serfontein (sopranos), Suzanne Erasmus (alto), Stephen Carletti (tenor), Timothy Visser (bass), , Marietjie Pauw (flute), Anmari van der Westhuizen (cello), Bennie van Eeden (piano), Stellenbosch Camerata, Acáma Fick (conductor). Music Commemorating the Huguenots. Sunset Recording Studios/Huguenot Foundation of South Africa, 2002)
- Concerto per flauto e orchestra; Concerto per pianoforte e orchestra; Ingoma (second orchestral version). Helen Vosloo (flute), François du Toit (piano), /National Symphony Orchestra of South Africa, Emmanuel Siffert (conductor). Distell Foundation for the Performing Arts: CDX02/002, 2002
- How sweet the moonlight. Stellenberg Girls Choir, André van der Merwe (conductor). Stellenberg Girls Choir in Concert. Cape Town: 2002
- Die Spokewals. Tuks Camerata, Johann van der Sandt (conductor). Sing Joyfully: Tuks Camerata in Concert. Pretoria: Jingle Jackets, 2002
- The sick rose and A cradle song' from Of Innocence and Experience; Winternag from Twee Gedigte van Eugène Marais; L'infinito from Tre liriche in stilo antico - version for voice, flute, piano; Oda à la bella desnuda (section 2); Zefiro torna' from Due sonetti di Petrarca. Julia Bronkhorst (soprano), Paula van Delden, (flute), Rebecca Smit (cello), Jacco Lamfers (piano). Swewe en Swerwe – Poetical Songs about and from South Africa. Eindhoven: Q DISC, Q 97042, 2003
- Sweet was the Song. Tygerberg Children's Choir, Hennie Loock (conductor). Christmas Time/Dis Kersfees. Cape Town: 2003
- Hodie Christus natus est - original version. Tygerberg Children's Choir, 30th anniversary re-union choir, Hennie Loock (conductor). Thank you for the music. Cape Town: 2005
- Sinfonia africana for soprano, choir and orchestra. Sabina Mossolow (soprano), Stellenbosch University Choir, Cape Philharmonic Orchestra, Lesley Dunner (conductor). Hendrik Hofmeyr – Sinfonia africana. Cape Philharmonic Orchestra, Cape Town: 2005
- Uqongqot'hwane; Die Dans van die Reën. Stellenbosch University Choir, André van der Merwe (conductor). Illumina. Cape Town: 2005
- Die Dans van die Reën. KwaZulu-Natal Youth Choir, Gérard'd du Toit (conductor). Celebration, 2005
- Hodie Christus natus est - Version for treble choir, Thula babana. Stellenberg Girls Choir, André van der Merwe (conductor). Inyanga Entsha. Cape Town: 2005
- Tango dal balletto Alice. I Grandi Violoncellisti. Dances for Six. Cello Classics: CC1019, 2006
- Sonata per corno e pianoforte. Shannon Armer (horn), Sandra Kettle (piano). Collected Works. South African Horn Society, Cape Town: 2006
- Pie Jesu. Singkronies Choir, Johann van der Sandt (conductor). South African Choral Music IV: Khutso. Prospect Tonstudio, Gema 00174, Helmstedt: 2006
- Super flumina Babylonis. University of Pretoria Camerata, Johann van der Sandt (conductor). An International Collection of Choral Music. Prospect Tonstudio, Gema 00175, Helmstedt: 2006
- Of Innocence and experience; Tre liriche in stile antico; Tre canzoni; en skielik is dit aand; Die stil avontuur; Vier gebede by jaargetye in die Boland. Zanne Stapelberg (soprano), André Howard (baritone), Hendrik Hofmeyr (piano). Hendrik Hofmeyr - Lieder. CDExpress, Cape Town: 2007
- Notturno elegiaco. Trio Hemanay. Trio Hemanay. Classic FM, HEM01, Johannesburg: 2007
- Die Dans van die Reën. Ljubljanski Madrigalisti, Andrea Martinjak (conductor). Blizu Srca. Sazas: 2007
- Luamerava. Ian Watson (violin). Journal for the Musical Arts in Africa, Vol. 4, 2007
- Desert Sun. Kamēr..., Maris Sirmais (conductor). World Sun Songs. Riga: 2008
- Batter my Heart. Pro Cantu, Leon Starker (conductor). PC07, Cape Town: 2008
- Mon amie, tu me suivras from Par les Sentiers de lumière, Pie Jesu. Pro Arte Singers, Arthur Sjögren (conductor). Pro Arte Singers - Thirty-Sixth Season 2008-2009. Candlewood Digital: PAS 3604
- The birth of Orc for choir; Pie Jesu. Stellenbosch University Choir, André van der Merwe (conductor). Laudate. Stellenbosch: 2009
- Winternag from Twee Gedigte van Eugène Marais; Nog in my laaste woorde from Die onverganglike oomblik. Vanessa Tait-Jones (soprano), André Howard (baritone), Elna van der Merwe (piano). ’n Eeu van Afrikaanse Liedkuns. Stellenbosch University and SA Akademie vir Wetenskap en Kuns, Stellenbosch: 2010
- Ainsi qu’on oit le cerf bruire. Melissa Manseau (soprano), Jennifer Yeaton-Paris (flute), Beth Pearson (cello), Paul Dykstra (piano). Rapport. Navona Records, NV5827, 96931 00027, Hampton, USA: 2010
- Concerto per flauto, violino e orchestra d’archi. Raffaele Trevisani (flute), Piet Koornhof (violin), Moscow Chamber Orchestra, Constantine Orbelian (conductor). New Century Flute Concertos. Delos, DE 3399, 0 13491 33992, Sonoma, USA: 2010
- It takes two .... Trio Hemanay. It takes three. HEM002, 6 001651 04457, Johannesburg: 2010
- Die Spokewals; Thula, babana - version for mixed choir. Akustika, Christo Burger (conductor). ACS002, Pretoria: 2010.
- Kaljanner Kaljanner, Thula, babana. Tygerberg Children's Choir, Hennie Loock (conductor). Champions in Song, Cape Town: 2011
- The Healing Prayer - Version for choir and organ. Pro Arte Singers, Michael Burnette (organ), Arthur Sjögren (conductor). Opening Concert 2010-2011: From Romantic to Contemporary. Candlewood Digital, PAS 3801, Stamford, USA: 2011
- Il poeta e l’usignolo. Liesl Stoltz (flute), Jacqueline Kerrod (harp). Cape Town: 2011
- Incantesimo. Marietjie Pauw (flute). Fofa le nna. Stellenbosch: 2012
- Canto notturno. Maria du Toit (clarinet), Nina Schumann (piano). (TwoPianists Records: TP1039145, 2012)
- A sexta autem hora. Stellenbosch University Choir, André van der Merwe (conductor). Headline - Stellenbosch University Choir in concert. Stellenbosch: 2012
- Rapsodia notturna Goran Krivokapić (guitar), Corneli Smit (piano). Chamber Music for Guitar and Piano. KSG Exaudio, 4260108670277, Germany: 2013
- Song of the Summer Wind. Owen Brits (flute), Farida Bacharova (violin). Song of the Summer Wind – Choral music and new South African works from the Darling Music Experience. DME/CD/2013, Darling: 2013
- String Quartet I, String Quartet II, Of Darkness and the Heart - Version for soprano and string quartet. Sabina Mossolow (soprano), Odeion String Quartet. Of Darkness and the Heart. SACM Productions, SACM20-0813, 0700371586300, Cape Town: 2013.
- Des ténèbres. Stellenbosch University Symphony Orchestra, Corvin Mattei (conductor). Hugenote Feeskonsert. Franschhoek: 2013
- Genesis; Lied van !Kho die Bloukraanvoël. Cape Town Youth Choir, Leon Starker (conductor). Chariots. Cape Town: 2014
- Die Spokewals. University of Pretoria Camerata, Michael Barrett (conductor). Phoenix. Pretoria: 2014
- Sonata for Flute and Piano, Mabalêl Fantasy, Il poeta e l’usignolo, Incantesimo, Marimba. Liesl Stoltz (flute), Jose Dias (piano), Francois du Toit (piano), Jacqueline Kerrod (harp). Explorations – South African Flute Music. SACM Productions, Cape Town: 2015
- Preludio and Umsindo from Partita africana. Renée Reznek (piano). From my beloved country – New South African piano music. ASC Records, PFCD055, 0607128 998792, London: 2017
- Variazioni sopra una ninnananna africana. Lieva Starker (violin). Lieva Starker. Cape Town: 2017
- Hodie Christus natus est – Version for mixed choir. Stellenbosch University Choir, André van der Merwe (conductor). Heaven’s Flock. Stellenbosch: 2019
- Preludio e Umdanso. Leon Bosch (double bass), Rebeca Omordia (piano). The South African Double Bass. Meridian, LC 13637, ISBN 50159466123, London: 2020
- Ballata africana, Partita africana, Endymion and the Moon, Philomela’s Night Song, Sonata for Flute and Piano, Sonata for Vibraphone and Piano. Marika Hofmeyr (piano), Phillipe Bernold (flute), Berthilde Dufour (violin), Phillipe Voituron (vibraphone). Hendrik Hofmeyr – Partita africana. Triton, ISBN 3487720005749, France: 2020
- Mabalêl Fantasy. Khanyisile Mthetwa (flute), Peter Cartwright (piano). African Bird. 198002104458, Johannesburg: 2021
- Of Innocence and Experience. Serafini Brillanti: Rhonda Nus Tinnin (soprano), Randall Tinnin (trumpet), Erin K. Bennett (piano). Centaur Records, 044747391328, USA: 2022
- Sonata for Clarinet and Piano, Sonata for Horn and Piano, Sonata I for Violin and Piano. Ferdinand Steiner (clarinet), Jeff Nelsen (horn), Alissa Margulis (violin), Nina Schumann (piano). Hofmeyr – Duo sonatas. TwoPianists, Amazon, Apple Music, Deezer, Spotify, South Africa: 2022
- Etude from Partita romantica. Laura Pauna (piano). Prismatica – Contemporary South African Piano Music. Vektor, iTunes, Spotify, Deezer, Pretoria: 2022
- Canto notturno. Danrè Strydom (clarinet), Grethe Nöthling (piano). Opus ZA – A collection of South African gems for clarinet and piano. Aliud, Spotify, Apple Music, The Netherlands: 2022
- Twee gedigte van Eugène Marais, Alleenstryd, Thula, thu, Die skaduwee van die son, Wintersprokie, Three Shakespeare sonnets, Die junge Magd. The worlds behind the words – Art songs of Hendrik Hofmeyr. SACM Productions, 659525338626, Cape Town: 2022
- Fantasia sopra ‘Senzeni na’, Woorde in die wind, Twee verjaarsdagliedere.

Minette du Toit-Pierce, (mezzo-soprano), Marika Hofmeyr (piano). Nagmusiek. Horus/Triton, ISBN 3487720005770, Amazon Music, Apple Music, Deezer, Spotify, Tidal, France: 2023

- Thula, thu, The broken string. Bree Nichols (soprano), Alexandr Starý (piano)

Tapestry of voices. Navona, NV6583, ISBN 896931008839, Amazon Music, Apple Music, Deezer, Spotify, Tidal, USA: 2023

- Saint Francis and the birds. Bandwidth Ensemble: Cobus du Toit (flute), Romie de Guise-Langlois (clarinet), Jonathan Hulting-Cohen (saxophone), Josh Michal (horn), Rémy Taghavi (bassoon). Where songs go at night. Neuma Records, Neuma 193, ISBN 733102526931, USA: 2024
- Amar(tan)go – Version for viola and piano. Louise Lansdown (viola), Charles Matthews (piano). Mzansi Viola – South African Viola Music. Meridian, CDE84671, Spotify, Deezer and other digital platforms, UK: 2025
