= PR1 M1x =

Paralympic rowing classification

PR1 M1x (previously AS M1x and earlier AM1x) is a Paralympic rowing classification. The classifications were developed and current as of March 2011. The event changed from A ("arms only") to AS ("arms and shoulders"), then in 2017 the designation was changed from AS to PR1.

== Sport ==
This is a Paralympic rowing classification. In 2008, BBC Sport defined this classification was "AM1x: A fixed-seat single scull boat for men. Athletes have full movement in their arms only." In 2008, the Australian Broadcasting Corporation defined this classification was "A (Arms Only): These rowers have no leg or trunk function, and are only able to row with the use of their arms."

== Becoming classified ==
Classification is handled by FISA – International Rowing Federation.

== At the Paralympic Games ==
For the 2016 Summer Paralympics in Rio, the International Paralympic Committee had a zero classification at the Games policy. This policy was put into place in 2014, with the goal of avoiding last minute changes in classes that would negatively impact athlete training preparations. All competitors needed to be internationally classified with their classification status confirmed prior to the Games, with exceptions to this policy being dealt with on a case by case basis.

== See also ==
- Adaptive rowing
- Adaptive rowing classification
- Rowing at the 2008 Summer Paralympics
- Rowing at the 2012 Summer Paralympics
