= IBGA =

IBGA may refer to

- Ball grid array - Interstitial Ball Grid Array (IBGA) is a type of Ball Grid Array (BGA). Redirected to main article.
- International Blind Golf Association - A governing organization of Blind golf associations around the world.
