= PR1 W1x =

Paralympic rowing classification

PR1 W1x (previously AS W1x and earlier AW1x) is a Paralympic rowing classification. The classifications were developed and current as of March 2011. The event changed from A ("arms only") to AS ("arms and shoulders"), then in 2017 the designation was changed from AS to PR1.

== Definition ==
This is a Paralympic rowing classification. In 2008, BBC Sport defined this classification was "AW1x: A fixed-seat single scull boat for women. Athletes have full movement in their arms only. " In 2008, the Australian Broadcasting Corporation defined this classification was "A (Arms Only): These rowers have no leg or trunk function, and are only able to row with the use of their arms."

== Becoming classified ==
Classification is handled by FISA – International Rowing Federation.

== See also ==
- Adaptive rowing
- Adaptive rowing classification
- Rowing at the 2008 Summer Paralympics
- Rowing at the 2012 Summer Paralympics
