= André van der Merwe =

André van der Merwe may refer to:

- André van der Merwe (urologist)
- André van der Merwe (conductor)
- André Carl van der Merwe, South African novelist
