= Dekoor Close Harmony =

Choir of 30 students of Utrecht University

- Choir
- Origin: Utrecht, Netherlands
- Founded: 1985
- Genre: Jazz, Pop, Gospel
- Members: 30
- Music director: Christoph Mac-Carty
- Affiliation: Utrecht University
- Awards: World Champion Gospel World Choir Games 2023; World Champion Jazz World Choir Games 2010 World Choir Games 2012 World Choir Games 2014 World Choir Games 2018 World Choir Games 2023; World Champion Pop World Choir Games 2012 World Choir Games 2014 World Choir Games 2018; Best Dutch Vocal Group BALK TOPfestival 2011 BALK TOPfestival 2013; Best Dutch Choir Korenslag 2007
- Website: www.dekoor.nl

Dekoor Close Harmony (1985) is a choir of 30 students of the Utrecht University in the Netherlands. Conducted by Christoph Mac-Carty, the choir brings a mix of jazz, gospel and pop to the stage, while occasionally experimenting with classical and world music as well. The choir mainly sings a cappella or is accompanied by their combo consisting of piano, bass and drums.

During their career, the choir has won several prizes. In 2007, Dekoor was crowned best choir of the Netherlands in the television program Korenslag (Clash of the Choirs). In 2010, the choir won the first prize in the Jazz category at the World Choir Games in China. At that same event, they won second prize in the categories Pop and Gospel. In 2012, Dekoor managed to keep their title at the World Choir Games in Cincinnati (USA) in the categories Jazz and Pop. In 2014 Dekoor managed to do it again, this time at the World Choir Games in Riga (Latvia). In the summer of 2018, the choir won first prize in the categories Jazz and Pop at the World Choir Games in Pretoria, South Africa. In 2023, Dekoor participated in the World Choir Games in Gangneung, South Korea, where they became champions in the category Jazz and for the first time also in the Gospel category.

The vocal group won the title for Best Dutch Vocal Group at both the 2011 and 2013 editions of the BALK TOPfestival, one of the larger choir festivals in the Netherlands. They also gained national fame after it won the first Dutch edition of the popular television show Clash of the Choirs in 2007.

In 2014, Dekoor performed with the Rolling Stones on their 14 On Fire tour for their performances at Pinkpop (NL) and TW Classic (BE).

In October 2014, Dekoor performed with Damien Rice at the Royal Carré Theatre.

In 2016, Dekoor toured throughout the Netherlands with their very first theater production. After this success, they wll bring a new show to the stage in 2017.

In 2016, Dekoor performed at Sziget, a yearly festival in Budapest.

== Discography ==
- Range (2023)
- Tuesdays (2014)
- Beter dan Ooit (2007)
- Still Crazy (2007)
- Dekoor Close Harmony - Best of 1995 - 2005 (2005)
- Dekoor Close Harmony - Korea (2004)
- A O.K. (2000)
- Rappo Funkin' Voices (1995)
