= B3 (classification) =

Blindness sports classification

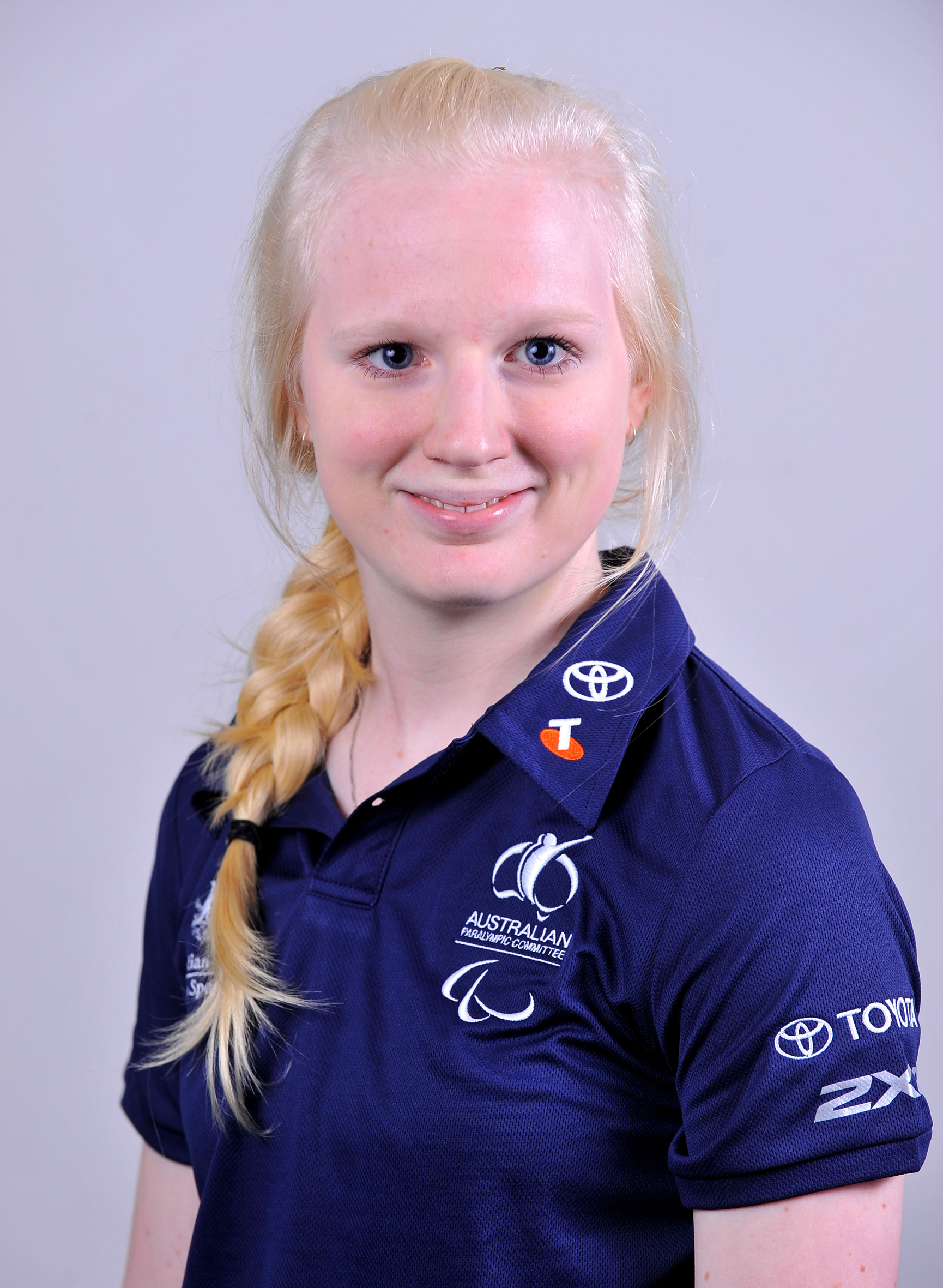
B3 classified Australian goalball player Jennifer Blow

B3 is a medical based Paralympic classification for blind sport. Competitors in this classification have partial sight, with visual acuity from 2/60 to 6/60. It is used by a number of blind sports including para-alpine skiing, para-Nordic skiing, blind cricket, blind golf, five-a-side football, goalball and judo. Some other sports, including adaptive rowing, athletics and swimming, have equivalents to this class.

The B3 classification was first created by the IBSA in the 1970s, and has largely remained unchanged since despite an effort by the International Paralympic Committee (IPC) to move towards a more functional and evidence-based classification system. Classification is often handled on the international level by the International Blind Sports Association (IBSA) although it is also handled by national sport federations. There are exceptions for sports like athletics and cycling.

Equipment utilized by competitors in this class may differ from sport to sport, and may include sighted guides, guide rails, beeping balls and clapsticks. There may be some modifications related to equipment and rules to specifically address needs of competitors in this class to allow them to compete in specific sports. Some sports specifically do not allow a guide, whereas cycling and skiing require one.

== Definition ==
B3 is a disability sport classification for people who have partial vision. The International Blind Sports Federation (IBSA) defines this classification as "From visual acuity above 2/60 to visual acuity of 6/60 and/or visual field of more than 5 degrees and less than 20 degrees." The Canadian Paralympic Committee defined B3 as "No more than 10% functional vision." Competitors in this class "can make out shapes with the help of glasses".

This classification is borrowed by some other sports, including blind golf who also define the class as "From visual acuity above 20/60 up to visual acuity of 6/60 and/or visual field of above 5 degrees and less than 20 degrees." Para-alpine skiing sport specific versions of this definition include one by the Australian Paralympic Committee which defined this classification as "Athletes with slightly more vision or more than five degrees but less than 20 degrees." The International Paralympic Committee defined B3 for alpine skiing as "From visual acuity above 20/60 up to visual acuity of 6/60 and/or visual field of more than 5 degrees and less than 20 degrees." This classification has parallels in other sports. For adaptive rowing, the comparable classification is LTA-B3; for athletics, the class is T13; and equivalent for swimming is S13.

IBSA handles classification for a number of sports internationally including five-a-side football, goalball and judo. Part of being classified involves assessing vision for factors including visual acuity, contrast sensitivity, color vision, motion detections and visual field. When being assessed into this class by the IBSA, the process first includes the athlete filling out a consent form, submitting a photograph, and scheduling an appointment with a classifier for evaluation. During the evaluation, the competitor may be accompanied by another person to assist them in communicating with the classifiers. If necessary, the person can also bring a translator. The assessment is then conducted and is medical. There are several status groups used by classifiers that assist in classification. This includes confirmed for competitors who have a visual impairment unlikely to change, Review for competitors who have vision that may fluctuate, New for competitors who have never been classified before, Not Eligible for competitors who have a visual impairment that is not severe enough and not likely to deteriorate in the future to the point where they could be eligible.

Classification is also handled on a national and by sport level. Australians seeking classification for blind sports can be classified by an IBSA classifier or an Australian Paralympic Committee vision impairment classifier. In the United Kingdom, blind sport is handled by British Blind Sport, which is recognized nationally by Sport England. In the United States, governance related to this classification is handled by the United States Association for Blind Athletes (USABA).

Not all sports use IBSA classifiers. For adaptive rowing, classification assignment may be handled by FISA, as was the case at the 2008 Summer Paralympics. In athletics, classification assignment may be handled by the IPC, as was the case at the 2008 Summer Paralympics. Cycling classification assignment for this class may be handled by the UCI, as was the case at the 2008 Summer Paralympic. Otherwise, the swimmer competes under the normal rules governing Fédération Internationale de Natation (FINA), the sport's highest authority, swimming competitions. Swimming classification handled by IPC Swimming.

== Sports ==
Eligible Paralympic sports for the B3 classification include adaptive rowing, athletics, cycling, five-a-side football, goalball, judo, para-alpine skiing, para-Nordic skiing, and swimming. On the Paralympic level, a number of disability sports are not open to this classification or other visually impaired competitors including archery, basketball, boccia, curling, fencing, ice sledge hockey, powerlifting, rugby, shooting, table tennis, tennis, volleyball. Equestrian sport is not open to Paralympic sport in this classification, and the FEI classification system has no parallel classification available for other levels of national and international competition. For non-Paralympic sports or sports removed from the Paralympic programme, the classification is used in blind golf and lawn bowls.

Performance can differ for this class compared to other blind classes. In swimming, the B1 class is significantly slower than B2 and B3 classes in 100 meter freestyle. The B3 class is significantly faster than B1 and B2 in the 100 meter backstroke.

== History ==
B3 traces its history to the early history of blind sport. There was a belief that those with vision impairment that was less severe had a competitive advantage over competitors who had more severe impairment. Classification was developed by the IBSA to ensure more even competition across the different bands of visual acuity. In 1976, the International Sports Organization for the Disabled (ISOD) developed a blind classification system. Parallel to this, IBSA and national blind sport associations were developing their own classification system, with the IBSA one based on visual acuity in place by 1980. The rise of the IBSA classification system for blind sport meant the ISOD classification system failed to gain traction in blind sports competition.

The IBSA classification system has largely remained unchanged since it was put in place, even as the International Paralympic Committee (IPC) attempted to move towards a more functional disability and evidence based system that does not rely on medical based classification. In 2003, the IPC made an attempt to address "the overall objective to support and co-ordinate the ongoing development of accurate, reliable, consistent and credible sport focused classification systems and their implementation." The IPC approved a classification system at the IPC General Assembly in 2007. This classification was part of the overall blind class group, and was still medically based despite changes in other disability types. IBSA was not prepared at the time to move towards a more functional classification system that is utilized other disability groups and sports.

In some cases, non-Paralympic, non-IBSA affiliated sports have developed their own classification systems. This is the case with blind golf, where a classification existed by 1990 and was used at the Australian Open Golf Tournament for the Blind and Visually Impaired. At that time, four classifications existed and were the same as the IBSA for this class.

== Equipment ==
Equipment utilized by competitors in the B3 class may include sighted guides, guide rails, beeping balls and clap sticks.

The use of a sighted guide by people in this class is dependent on the specific requirements of the sport. In athletics, where the parallel classification is T13, runners do not use guides in competition and generally do not use them in training. In cycling, this classification uses a guide, while utilizing a tandem bicycle with the guide sitting at the front. When a cyclist is looking for a guide, they are encouraged to find one with a pace similar to their own.

B3 classified Canadian skier Mac Marcoux and guide BJ Marcoux in action at the IPC Alpine World Championships in 2013

In para-alpine and para-Nordic skiing, guides for B2 and B3 skiers often position themselves differently as the skiers have some vision, which means the things a guide assists with will be different from what is required of a skier who has almost no sight. The guide may ski in front of the skier and use visual cues to inform the skier of what is ahead of them on the course.

For S13 swimmers, a tapper may stand on the pool deck to tap the swimmer as they approach the wall. The swimmer has to bring their own tapper. Having a tapper is optional.

In blind archery, B3 archers must use a tactile sighting device, and be unable to use a bow sight.

== Rules ==
There are some rule differences for the B3 classification in competition that are sport specific. In adaptive rowing's Coxed Four boat, LTA4+, the maximum number of rowers from this class allowed in the boat is one. In athletics, T13 runners may get assistance at water stations in longer races. In blind cricket, no more than four players in this class are allowed out of the eleven total players.

While this classifications is open to five-a-side blind football, women are not eligible to compete at the Paralympic Games. This classification is eligible to play goalkeeper but in some competitions is not allowed to be a field player.

In judo, all three blind sport classes compete against each other, with competitors classified by weight for the purposes of competition. Weight classes use the international standards used in the Olympics.

In IBSA sailing competitions, the three person boat can have a maximum of five points, and must include at least one female and one male sailor on the boat. In competitions run by Blind Sailing International, this class sometimes competes only against other boats with where all the sailors are in this class.

In swimming, outside the use of a tapper, the swimmer competes under the normal rules governing FINA swimming competitions.
