= Sabina Mossolow =

Namibian operatic soprano

Sabina Mossolow (born 1959) is a Namibian operatic soprano.

== Early life ==
Mossolow was born in Windhoek, Namibia, in 1959 to Russian-German parentage. Her father was the historian and archivist Nikolai Mossolow.

A student of Nellie du Toit, Mossolow completed a Bachelor's degree in music and French, an honours degree in journalism, a higher performer's licentiate in music and an honours and master's degree in music at Stellenbosch University. Her masters thesis looked at the life of her mentor du Toit.

For nine years she resided in Freiburg, Germany, where she furthered her vocal studies at the Staatliche Hochschule für Musik under Beata Heuer-Christen and Maria Orán.

== Career ==
Mossolow made her debut with the Natal Philharmonic Orchestra at the Youth Concerto Festival in Durban under David Tidboald.

Donald Runnicles contracted her to the Freiburg Municipal Theatre where she sang roles such as Musetta in La bohème, Micaëla in Carmen, Erste Dame in Die Zauberflöte, Ghita in Der Zwerg, Fiordiligi in Così fan tutte, Marina in I quatro rusteghi and Violetta in La traviata, working with directors such as Christof Loy and Gerd Heinz.

Since her return to South Africa in the late nineties, Mossolow has sung locally, in Namibia, Germany and Italy in recitals ranging from opera, operetta and lieder to lighter classical fare. She has appeared at various arts festivals locally and enjoys the artistic teamwork of accompanists such as Albie van Schalkwyk, Elna van der Merwe, Benjamin van Eeden, Lisa Engelbrecht and José Dias.

== Repertoire ==
Mossolow sang Les nuits d'été (Berlioz) at the Oude Libertas Amphitheatre with the Cape Town Symphony Orchestra and was the soprano soloist in Beethoven's 9th Symphony with the CPO under Benjamin Zander. She was understudy for Andrea Catzel in the role of the Marschallin in Richard Strauss's Der Rosenkavalier for Cape Town Opera. Her oratorio repertoire includes Handel's Messiah, Mozart's Mass in C Minor as well as Cartellieri's Gioas, re di Guida at the Musiktage St. Peter with the Freiburger Kammerorchester under Klaus Hövelmann.

== Collaborations ==
On several occasions Mossolow collaborated with composer Hendrik Hofmeyr as accompanist in recitals that included his works. Amongst others she has sung the première of his Sinfonia Africana with the Cape Philharmonic Orchestra, Dover Beach and Due Sonetti di Petrarca with the Collage ensemble, Die Stil Avontuur, and has recorded his song cycle Of Darkness and the Heart with the Odeon String Quartet in Bloemfontein.

== Recognition ==
She won the voice category of the ATKV Forte Competition. She was a semi-finalist in the UNISA International Singing Competition and received master classes from Galina Vishnevskaja in Salzburg, Kammersängerin Margherita Lilowa in Varna, Bulgaria, as well as Elly Ameling. Mossolow is the recipient of an International Richard Wagner Society bursary.

== Reviews ==
External image
- Sabina Mossolw

In a review written of her performance at Cape Town's Artscape Opera House, Mustapha Hendricks wrote: "But the true vibrations came in the form of a bona fide diva, Namibian soprano Sabina Mossolow. Her velveteen voice played melodically with the chords of Verdi's "Merce, dilette amiche". There was a suave, mischievous sassiness to the way she moved around and she brought gentle giggles to the audience with her dramatically trembling voice. The hint of cheek and comedy in her performance reminded us of the more playful, humorous side of a medium often mistaken for being only serious and tragic."
