= Disability classification in golf =

Disability sport classification system

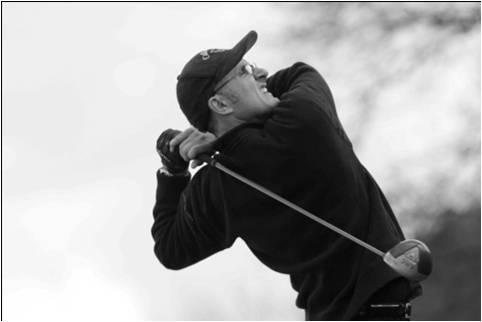
A golf competitor at the Handi Pro Am

Disability golf classification is used for deaf golf, blind golf, amputee golf, golf for mentally disabled people, paraplegic golf and other forms of golf involving people with disabilities.

== Classifications ==
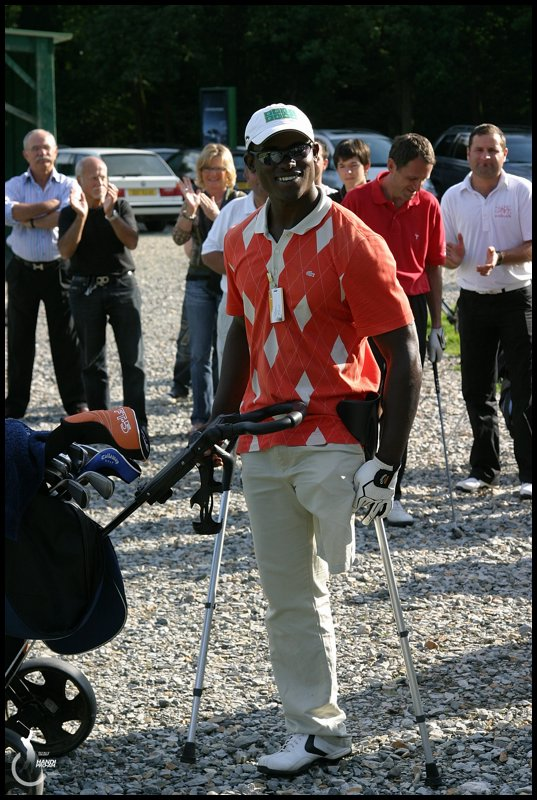
An amputee playing golf

=== Blind golf ===
Blind golf is a version of the sport of golf adapted for blind and partially sighted players.

==== History ====
The Western Canadian Blind Golf Association Logo

The earliest record of blind golf is from the 1920s in the United States: Clint Russell of Duluth, Minnesota, who lost his sight when a tire exploded in his face, began playing blind golf in 1925. Gradually increasing his scores, Clint managed to shoot an 84 for 18 holes in the early 1930s. A match between two blind Englishmen and two Americans took place before the Second World War.

Organized blind golf tournaments have taken place in America since the United States Blind Golf Association (USBGA) was established in 1947. The International Blind Golf Association (IBGA) was established in 1997 at a meeting held in Perth, Western Australia.

The American Blind Golf organization was established in 2001 to promote the game of golf to blind and vision impaired persons.

==== Classification ====
The Blind golf classification existed by 1990 and was used at the Australian Open Golf Tournament for the Blind and Visually Impaired. The four classifications were B1, B2, B3 and B4. Classifications in use at the time included B1, B2 and B3.

B1

B1 was defined as "No light perception in either eye, up to some light perception but inability to recognize the shape of a hand at any distance or in any direction."

B2

B2 was defined as "the ability to recognize the shape of a hand up to visual acuity of 2/60, or a visual field of less than 5 degrees."

B3

B3 was defined as "visual acuity above 20/60, up to visual acuity of 6/60 and/or visual field of above 5 degrees and less than 20 degrees."

B4

B4 was defined as "visual acuity of 6/60 up to visual acuity of 6/46."

The blind classifications are based on medical classification, not functional classification. The classification process for blind golf is governed by the International Blind Golf Association.

==== Playing blind golf ====
Blind golf is outstanding in the area of disabled sports in that it includes only minor modifications to the standard rules of golf. The principle of playing is that blind or partially sighted golf players have a sighted coach who assists the golfer in describing distance, direction and characteristics of the hole, and helps with club head alignment behind the ball, prior to the stroke. From that point, the golfer is on his own, and it is her/his skill that determines the resulting stroke.

Other than the coach, there is only one relaxation to the standard rules: blind or partially sighted golfers are allowed to ground their club in a hazard.

Blind golf competitions are set in classes determined by the golfer's level of sight (see above) using the same categories as in other branches of sports played by the visually impaired.

Blind Golf in Canada

The Canadian Blind Golf Association was established in 1951. However, it has not been a functioning association since the mid-1980s. The Western Division and Ontario Visually Impaired Golf Association continued to operate independently and are currently making efforts to restructure the Canadian Association. The Canadian Association uses the same standards as the International Blind Sports Federation, with one exception: level of sight classification is based on acuity only, and not field of vision. The rationale is that golf is a dead ball sport and a player with "tunnel vision" can see the ball clearly when striking it.

American Blind Golf

American Blind Golf (ABG) was established in 2001. ABG partners with blind charities to raise money for blind services. ABG holds annual tournaments and fund raising events in San Antonio, Texas, Wadsworth Ohio and Lompoc California. The motto of ABG is "inspire, motivate and serve all of those who deal with the loss of sight".

==== Governance ====
The International Blind Golf Association is an international association of blind golf playing countries. The sport is not played at the Paralympics.

The IBGA conducts a world championship every two years. The 2004 world championship tournament was held in Australia. Other tournaments sanctioned by the IBGA include National Open events in Australia, Great Britain, Canada, Japan and the United States. There are currently nine member countries in the IBGA: Australia, Canada, England, Germany, Ireland, Japan, Northern Ireland, Scotland and the United States of America.

== Paralympic Games ==
Golf has been submitted multiple times for inclusion in the programme of the Summer Paralympic Games, but bids for inclusion in the 2016 and 2024 Summer Paralympics did not come to fruition.

== Outstanding player achievements ==
- The first hole-in-one recorded by a blind or visually impaired golfer in a National Open was made by Graham Salmon, MBE.
- In March 2005, American blind golfer Joel Ludvicek, 78, scored a hole-in-one in the 168-yard No. 11 hole at the Twin Pines golf course in Iowa, United States.
- In November 2005, Israeli blind golfer Zohar Sharon, 53, achieved a hole-in-one on the 15th hole at the Caesarea golf course in Israel.
- In August 2007, Sheila Drummond, a member of the board of directors of the United States Blind Golfers Association, scored a hole-in-one on the fourth hole at Mahoning Valley Country Club.

In October 2012 Andy Gardiner became the first amputee golfer to compete against able bodied golfers on a regular Professional Tour (Jamega Tour). Gardiner was the first disabled golfer to qualify through Q school and play on the PGA Europro Tour. Held #1 ranking through 2012-2014 (104 successive weeks). Gardiner scored his 11th Hole in One in July 2016 on 7th hole, Linden Hall Golf Club during Scotland V England international match play.

== Additional sources ==
- Blind Golf Australia
- Blindness Grading Form on the Blind Sailing, New Zealand web site
