= LTA-B1 =

Paralympic rowing classification

LTA-B1 is an adaptive rowing classification. The classifications were developed and current as of March 2011.

== Definition ==
Rowing Australia defines this classification as "athletes with a visual impairment (LTA-B1, LTA-B2 and LTA-B3)"

== Events ==
Rowers in this classification compete in single and sculls for club, state, and national competitions. In international competitions, they compete in mixed cox fours sculls, with a maximum of two visually impaired rowers in the boat.

== Becoming classified ==
Classification is handled by FISA – International Rowing Federation. Australians seeking classification through Rowing Australia as a visually impaired rower need to provide evidence of having been classified by an International Blind Sports Federation (IBSA) classifier or an Australian Paralympic Committee vision impairment classifier.

== See also ==
- Adaptive rowing
- Adaptive rowing classification
- Rowing at the 2008 Summer Paralympics
- Rowing at the 2012 Summer Paralympics
