= Nikolai Mossolow =

Nikolai Mossolow (1 July 1910 – 9 November 1988) was a Russian-born Namibian historian and archivist.

Mossolow was born in St. Petersburg, Russia in 1910, to Colonel Constantine Mossolow (1866–1924) and former dancer Xenia Vladimirovna Bosse (1886–1972). Mossolow first came to Namibia, then named South West Africa, in 1931 to visit his mother who had emigrated to that country and married a German Karakul farmer shortly after his father's death. He returned to Europe to study History of Art, Anthropology, Archaeology and Ancient Languages at the University of Dorpat in Estonia, the Friedrich-Wilhelms University in Berlin, and the German Archaeological Institute in Rome. but returned to South West Africa in 1939 when he saw that the outbreak of World War II was inevitable. He then worked as an archivist in the National Archives in Windhoek and later published numerous historical books and articles about South West African places, persons and events. Mossolow married Gisela Herta Alice Wollmann, and on his retirement in the early 1980s, he and his family moved to Somerset West outside Cape Town, South Africa, where he died on 9 November 1988. His daughter is the South African operatic soprano Sabina Mossolow.

== Works ==
- This was old Windhoek 1965
- Otjikango oder Gross-Barmen: Ortsgeschichte der ersten Rheinischen Herero-Missionsstation in Südwestafrika, 1844-1904 1966
- Windhoek to-day 1967
- Die Geschichte von Rooibank-Scheppmannsdorf 1969
- Die Geschichte von Namutoni 1971
- Windhoek. Drei historische Wahrzeichen 1972
- Waterberg : Beitrag zur Geschichte der Missionsstation Otjozondjupa, des Kambazembi-Stammes und des Hererolandes 1980
