= B1 (classification) =

Blindness sports classification

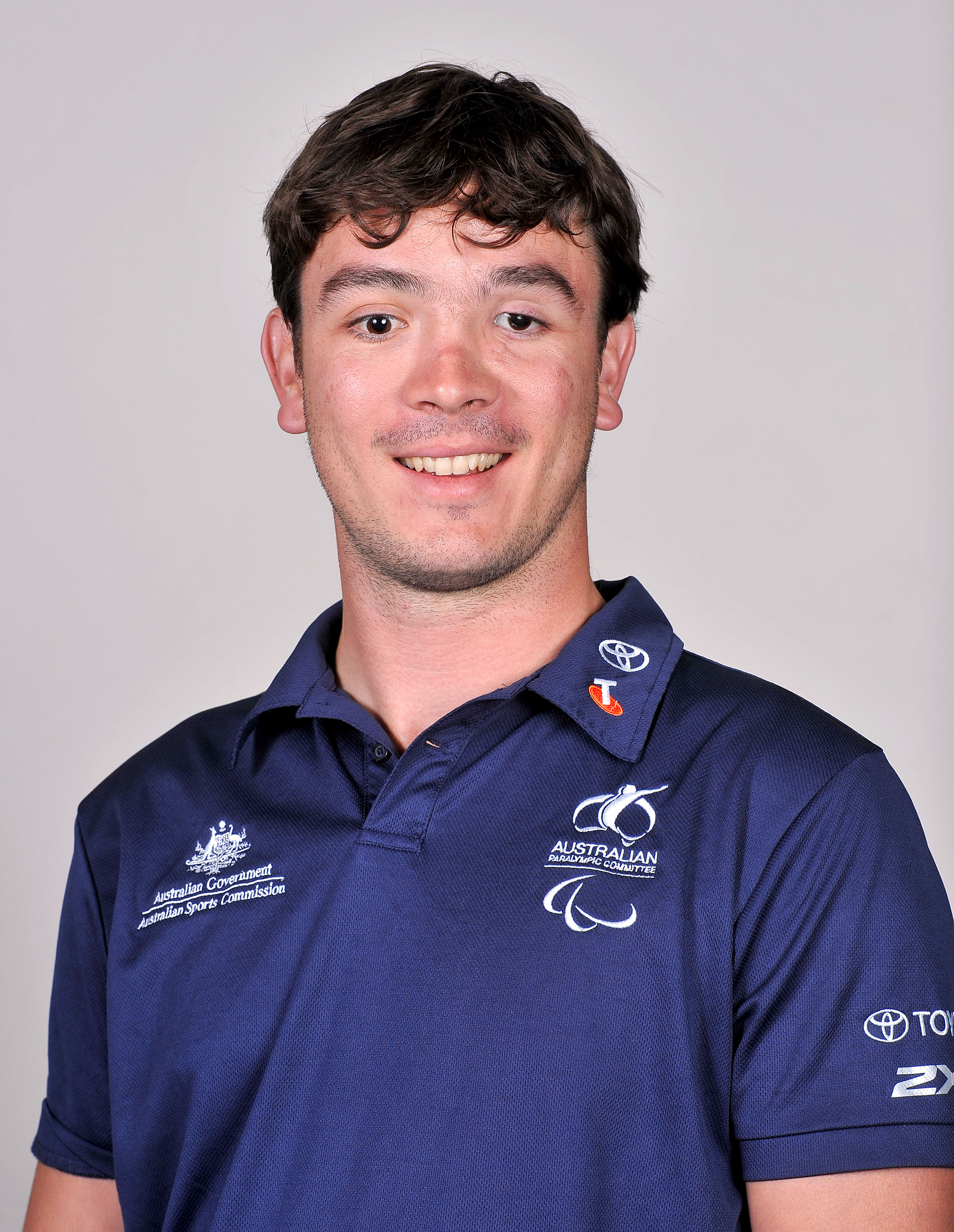
Australia's Bryce Lindores is a B1 classified athlete

B1 is a medical-based Paralympic classification for blind sport. Athletes in this classification are totally or almost totally blind. It is used by a number of blind sports including blind tennis, blind cricket, blind golf, five-a-side football, goalball and judo. Some other sports, including adaptive rowing, athletics and swimming, have equivalents to this class. It was used by para-alpine skiing and para-Nordic skiing until 2024.

The B1 classification was first created by the IBSA in the 1970s, and has largely remained unchanged since despite an effort by the International Paralympic Committee (IPC) to move towards a more functional and evidence-based classification system. Classification is often handled on the international level by the International Blind Sports Federation (IBSA) but it sometimes handled by national sport federations. There are exceptions for sports like athletics and cycling, where classification is handled by their own governing bodies.

Equipment utilized by competitors in this class may differ from sport to sport, and may include sighted guides, guide rails, beeping balls and clapsticks. There may be some modifications related to equipment and rules to specifically address needs of competitors in this class to allow them to compete in specific sports. Some sports specifically do not allow a guide, whereas cycling and skiing require one.

== Definition ==
B1 is a disability sport classification for people who are considered blind. The International Blind Sports Federation (IBSA) defines this classification as visual acuity poorer than LogMAR 2.60. The Canadian Paralympic Committee defined this classification as "No functional vision." This classification is borrowed by some other sports, including blind golf who also define the class as "No light perception in either eye, up to light perception but inability to recognise the shape of a hand at any distance or in any direction."

Para-alpine skiing specific versions of this definition include one by the Australian Paralympic Committee which defined this classification as this classification in alpine skiing as "Athletes totally blind or who have some light perception but can't see even the shape of a hand at any distance from their face." The International Paralympic Committee defined this classification for alpine skiing as "No light perception in either eye, up to light perception but inability to recognise the shape of a hand at any distance or in any direction."

This classification has parallels in other sports. The comparative classification in adaptive rowing is LTA-B1. In para-equestrian, Grade 3 is equivalent to B1. The para-equestrian classification definition is different from the IBSA one, with BBC Sport defining Grade 3 as, "Grade 3 incorporates Cerebral Palsy, Les Autres, Amputee, Spinal Cord Injury and totally blind athletes with good balance, leg movement and co-ordination." The B1 equivalent for swimming is S11, while for athletics, the equivalent classification is T11.

== Governance ==
IBSA handles classification for a number of sports internationally including five-a-side football, goalball and judo. Part of being classified involves assessing vision for factors including visual acuity, contrast sensitivity, color vision, motion detections and visual field.

Assessment into this class by the IBSA involves the athlete filling out a consent form, submitting a photograph, and scheduling an appointment with a classifier for evaluation. During the evaluation, the competitor may be accompanied by another person to assist them in communicating with the classifiers. If necessary, the person can also bring a translator. The medical assessment is then conducted. There are several status groups used by classifiers that assist in classification. These include confirmed for competitors who have a visual impairment unlikely to change, review for competitors who have vision that may fluctuate, new for competitors who have never been classified before, and not eligible for competitors who have a visual impairment that is not severe enough and not likely to deteriorate in the future to the point where they could be eligible.

Classification is handled on a national and sport level. Australians seeking classification for blind sports can be classified by an IBSA classifier or by an Australian Paralympic Committee vision impairment classifier. In the United Kingdom, blind sport is handled by British Blind Sport, which is recognised nationally by Sport England. In the United States, governance related to this classification is handled by the United States Association for Blind Athletes (USABA).

Not all sports use IBSA classifiers. For adaptive rowing, classification assignment may be handled by the Fédération Internationale des Sociétés d'Aviron (FISA), cycling by the Union Cycliste Internationale (UCI), para-equestrian, by the Fédération Équestre Internationale (FEI). Swimming classification is handled by IPC Swimming, while in athletics, classification assignment for this class is handled by the IPC.

== History ==
This classification traces its history to the early history of blind sport. There was a belief that those with vision impairment that was less severe had a competitive advantage over competitors who had more severe impairment. Classification was developed by the IBSA to insure more even competition across the different bands of visual acuity. In 1976, the International Sports Organization for the Disabled (ISOD) developed a blind classification system. Parallel to this, IBSA and national blind sport associations were developing their own classification system, with the IBSA one based on visual acuity in place by 1980. The rise of the IBSA classification system for blind sport meant the ISOD classification system failed to gain traction in blind sports competition.

The IBSA classification system has largely remained unchanged since it was put in place, even as the International Paralympic Committee (IPC) attempted to move towards a more functional disability and evidence based system that does not rely on medical-based classification. In 2003, the IPC made an attempt to address "the overall objective to support and co-ordinate the ongoing development of accurate, reliable, consistent and credible sport focused classification systems and their implementation." The IPC approved a classification system at the IPC General Assembly in 2007. This classification was part of the overall blind class group, and was still medically-based despite changes in other disability types. IBSA was not prepared at the time to move towards a more functional classification system similar to that utilized other disability groups and sports.

In some cases, non-Paralympic, non-IBSA affiliated sports have developed their own classification systems. This is the case with blind golf, where a classification existed by 1990 and was used at the Australian Open Golf Tournament for the Blind and Visually Impaired. At that time, four classifications existed and were the same as the IBSA for this class.

In 1990, the Equestrian Federation of Australia did not have specific classifications for competitors with disabilities, including those with visual impairments. Acknowledging membership needs though, some rules had organically developed that looked like classifications based on rule modification for different disability types including blind riders. These included allowing blind riders, when they reached a marker, being given an auditory signal to inform them of this.

== Equipment ==
Equipment utilized by competitors in this class may include sighted guides, guide rails, beeping balls and clap sticks. The use of a sighted guide by people in this class is dependent on the specific requirements of the sport. Para-alpine and para-Nordic skiers use guides, with the guide for B1 skiers generally skiing behind the skier in order to maximize the ability of the skier to hear the guide. The guide tells the skier things like when weight should be shifted, elements coming up on the course, and how to position themselves to maximize the diagonal run of the course. In cycling, this classification also uses a guide, utilizing a tandem bicycle with the guide sitting at the front.

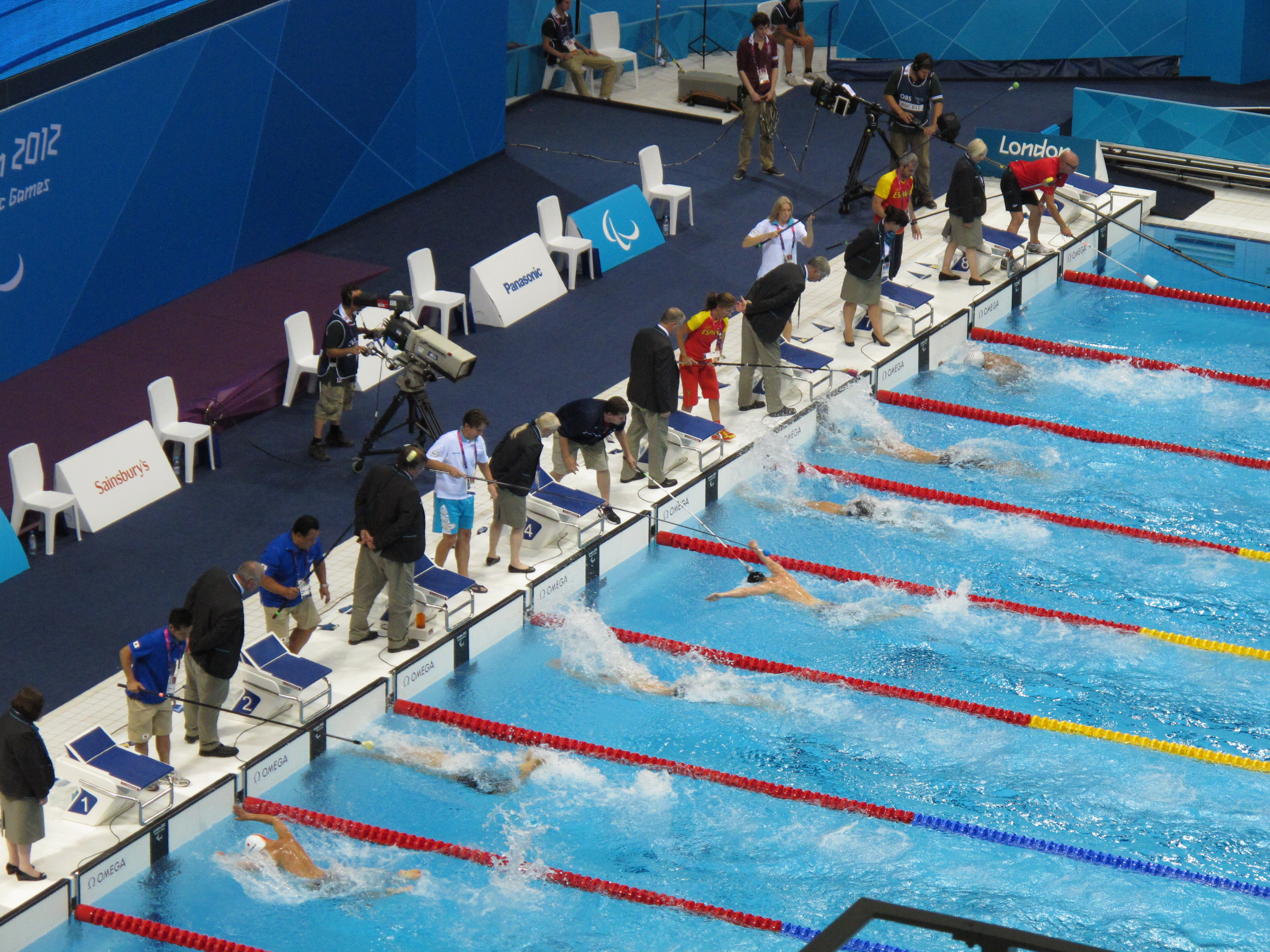
S11 race at the 2012 Paralympics: swimmers being tapped to show they should turn

Competitors must use a guide in athletics. When a runner is looking for a guide, they are encouraged to find one with a gait similar to their own. A rope or tether may be used to connect the runner to the guide. For field events such as the long jump triple jump, or discus, a caller may be used. Voice commands can also be used in 100 meter events. At the 2012 Summer Paralympics, it was the first time guides in athletics were awarded medals. At the elite level, guides are treated the same as the blind runner. Guides and runners must both use blocks for any race shorter than 400 meters. In 200 meter races, the guide runs on the right side of the runner. For races 800 meters or longer, a runner may use up to two guides but the course officials must be informed of any decision to use more than one guide in advance of the race. In the marathon, the runner may use up to four different guides. The runner must finish ahead of the guide. In running, the guide should attempt to match the running pattern of the runner, not the other way around.

Callers are used in para-equestrian to assist the rider in navigating the competition ring. For S11 swimmers, a tapper stands on the pool deck to tap the swimmer as they approach the wall. The swimmer has to bring their own tapper. Swimmers in this class are required to wear black out goggles. In blind archery competitions, archers use a blind fold and a tactile sighting device. This classification is not eligible to compete at the Paralympic Games. In five-a-side football and para-equestrian, B1 competitors are required to wear blindfolds. In judo, B1 classified competitors have a red dot on their kit to let others know they are completely blind.

== Rules ==
There are special rules for this class in several sports. In blind cricket, each team of eleven must have at least four players in this class. Batsmen in this class have a runner for them. A B1 classified cricketer should bat in one of the first three batting positions. There should be at least 2 B1 batters in the first six batsmen, and at least three in the first nine. A bowler in this class may bowl to any batman, but may only face a bowler in the same class.

In five-a-side football, this class is often the only one allowed to compete as a field player. In judo, all three blind sport classes compete against each other with competitors classified by weight for the purposes of competition. Weight classes use the international standards used in the Olympics.

In IBSA sailing competitions, this class is represented as the helmsperson. The three person boat can have a maximum of five ISBA points (i.e. B1 counting as one point, B2 as 2 and B3 as three), and must include at least one female and one male sailor on the boat. In competitions run by Blind Sailing International, this class sometimes competes only against other boats with where all the sailors are in the same class.

In swimming, the B1 class is significantly slower than B2 and B3 classes in 100 metre freestyle, and the B3 class is significantly faster than B1 and B2 in the 100 metre backstroke. Normal swimming rules are modified to allow the swimmer to be closer to the lane line when executing a turn.

== Sports ==
On the Paralympic level, a number of disability sports are not open to this classification or other visually impaired competitors including archery, fencing, powerlifting, shooting and table tennis. Eligible Paralympic sports for this classification include adaptive rowing, athletics, cycling, five-a-side football, goalball, judo, para-equestrian, para-alpine skiing, para-Nordic skiing, and swimming. The classification is also used in other sports including blind golf and lawn bowls.
