= Stellenbosch University Choir =

South African choir

- Choir
- Stellenbosch University Choir logo.
- Founded: 1936
- Genre: Varied
- Members: 95–120
- Director: André van der Merwe (2003–)
- Affiliation: Stellenbosch University
- Website: www.sun.ac.za/english/entities/choir

The Stellenbosch University Choir (Afrikaans: Stellenbosch Universiteitskoor) is a choir affiliated with Stellenbosch University. Founded in 1936, it is the oldest choir in South Africa. The choir is viewed as a leading South African choral ensemble and has toured overseas extensively where it has won critical acclaim for its performances. The current conductor, André van der Merwe, was appointed at the beginning of 2003.

== History ==
The choir was founded in 1936 by William Morris and has established itself as one of the best choirs in South Africa and the world.

=== Conductors ===
The current conductor of the choir is André van der Merwe (since 2003).

Previous conductors:

- William Morris (1936-1939)
- Gawie Cillie (1939-1955)
- Prof. Philip McLachlan (1956-1975)
- Prof. Johan de Villiers (1976-1984)
- Acama Fick (1985-1992)
- Sonja van der Walt (1993-2002).

== Notable Achievements ==
=== Interkultur World Rankings ===
From October 2012 until August 2024, the Stellenbosch University Choir was rated as the top amateur choir in the world by the Interkultur Foundation world ranking system, with a maximum possible score of 1272 points.

The choir was also placed in the top 10 rankings for various categories, namely, first in the Mixed Choirs category (1272 points), second in the Sacred Music & Music of the Religions category (1233 points), and first in the Pop, Jazz, Gospel, Spiritual & Barber Shop category (1234 points).

The choir was removed from the Interkultur World Rankings in August 2024, according to the World Rankings rules, as the choir had not competed in any Interkultur events in the past five years.

=== World Choir Games ===
The choir first attended the Interkultur World Choir Games in 2004, at the 3rd Choir Olympics (now World Choir Games) held in Bremen, Germany.

In 2018, André van der Merwe, was appointed as the chairperson of the National Artistic Committee for the 2018 World Choir Games held in Tshwane, South Africa; therefore the choir did not participate in this edition of the competition. The choir did however perform as a demonstration- and show choir during the event.

Category	Points	Result
3rd World Choir Games, Bremen, Germany (2004)
Mixed Youth Choirs	93.13 (Gold)	Category winner
Folklore A Cappella	85.75 (Gold)	4th Place
5th World Choir Games, Graz, Austria (2008)
Mixed Youth Choirs	85.25 (Gold)	4th Place
Musica Sacra (Open)	92.13 (Gold)	Category winner
Gospel & Spiritual (Open)	92.13 (Gold)	Runner-up
6th World Choir Games, Shaoxing, China (2010)
Mixed Choirs	95.75 (Gold)	Category winner
Musica Contemporanea	90.88 (Gold)	Category winner
7th World Choir Games, Cincinnati, Ohio, USA (2012)
Mixed Choirs	93.50 (Gold)	Category winner
Musica Sacra	96.88 (Gold) *	Category winner
Popular Choral Music	91.25 (Gold)	Runner-up
8th World Choir Games, Riga, Latvia (2014)
Mixed Choirs	99.00 (Gold) *	Category winner
Musica Sacra with Accompaniment	95.63 (Gold)	Category winner
Spiritual	98.38 (Gold) *	Category winner
9th World Choir Games, Sochi, Russia (2016)
Musica Sacra A Cappella	92.75 (Gold)	Category winner
Musica Contemporanea	98.25 (Gold)	Category winner
Spiritual	96.88 (Gold)	Category winner

* World Choir Games record

=== Llangollen International Musical Eisteddfod ===
The choir's first attendance of the Llangollen International Musical Eisteddfod, in Llangollen, Wales was in 2018 where they won all three categories they competed in, but ultimately lost to the National University of Singapore in the finals. The choir was also invited to perform in the coveted International Celebration Concert at the event.

Category	Points	Result
2018
A2 Youth Choirs	95.70	Category winner
A1 Mixed Choirs	92.00	Category winner
A5 Open Choirs	95.30	Category winner

=== European Choir Games and Grand Prix of Nations ===
In July 2025, the choir competed in the 6th European Choir Games and Grand Prix of Nations in Aarhus, Denmark. This was the choir’s first international competition after a 7-year hiatus. During the event, the choir performed in a celebration concert with the Akademisk Kor Aarhus, which was regarded as a highlight of the festival programme.

Category	Points	Result
2025
GP4 Adult Choirs	96.56	Runner-up
GP6 Musica Sacra A Capella	95.31	3rd Place
GP8 Jazz, Pop, Show	95.69	Runner-up

=== Other ===
At the 9th World Choir Games in 2016, the choir was awarded the Hänssler-INTERKULTUR CD Award, as the best choir at the event. The award includes an album deal with the Hänssler Classic record label.

== International Tours ==
In 2022, the choir was invited to perform at the funeral of Princess Margaret Obaigbena in Asaba, Nigeria. The choir undertook a week-long trip to Lagos and Asaba, before returning to Cape Town.

In 2023, the choir was invited by Dr Haruhisa Handa to perform at the ISPS Sports Values Summit in Tokyo, Japan. The choir undertook a 6-day-long trip to Tokyo where they performed at the summit and met Prince Harry, Duke of Sussex, who admitted that he is a fan of the choir.
