= LTA-B2 =

Paralympic rowing classification

LTA-B2 is an adaptive rowing classification. The classifications were developed and current as of March 2011.

== Definition ==
Rowing Australia defines this classification as "athletes with a visual impairment (LTA-B1, LTA-B2 and LTA-B3)"

== Events ==
Rowers in this classification compete in single and sculls for club, state, and national competitions. In international competitions, they compete in mixed cox fours sculls, with a maximum of two visually impaired rowers in the boat.

== At the Paralympic Games ==
For the 2016 Summer Paralympics in Rio, the International Paralympic Committee had a zero classification at the Games policy. This policy was put into place in 2014, with the goal of avoiding last minute changes in classes that would negatively impact athlete training preparations. All competitors needed to be internationally classified with their classification status confirmed prior to the Games, with exceptions to this policy being dealt with on a case-by-case basis.

== Becoming classified ==
Classification is handled by FISA – International Rowing Federation. Australians seeking classification through Rowing Australia as a visually impaired rower need to provide evidence of having been classified by an International Blind Sports Federation (IBSA) classifier or an Australian Paralympic Committee vision impairment classifier.

== See also ==
- Adaptive rowing
- Adaptive rowing classification
- Rowing at the 2008 Summer Paralympics
- Rowing at the 2012 Summer Paralympics
