= 1st Choir Olympics =

International song competition

- Genre: Choral Music
- Date: 7–16 July 2000
- Locations: Linz, Austria
- Previous event: n/a
- Next event: 2nd Choir Olympics, 19–27 October 2002 Busan, South Korea
- Organiser: Interkultur Foundation
- Website: www.interkultur.com/events/world-choir-games/linz-2000/

The 1st Choir Olympics was the first instance of the international choir competition, organised by the Interkultur Foundation, that would later become known as the World Choir Games. The competition took place in Linz, Austria, and featured participating choirs from 60 countries.

== Contest ==
The 1st Choir Olympics took place from 7 to 16 July 2000. More than 15,000 choral singers from 60 countries gathered in Linz, Austria for the premiere of the Choir Olympics. The competition was held over a total of 403 performances in 28 categories. At the conclusion of the event the international jury - consisting of 51 jurors - presented 69 gold, 124 silver, and 34 bronze medals to the participating choirs.

== Results ==
According to the final results of the 1st Choir Olympics, the five top medal-scoring countries were:

Position	Country	Medals
1	Hungary	10
2	China	8
3	Germany	7
4	Indonesia	6
5	Russia	5
