= PR3 4+ =

Paralympic rowing classification

PR3 4+ (previously LTA4+) is a Paralympic rowing classification. The classifications were developed and current as of March 2011. In 2017 the designation was changed from LTA to PR3.

== Definition ==
This is a Paralympic rowing classification. In 2008, BBC Sport defined this classification was "LTA4+: A four-person, mixed gender, sweep-oar boat plus cox with sliding seats. Open to athletes with an impairment but who have movement in the legs, trunk and arms. A boat can include a maximum of two visually impaired athletes." In 2008, the Australian Broadcasting Corporation defined this classification was "LTA (Legs, Trunk, Arms): These rowers include all competitors who have a minimum disability. They are able to use their legs, trunk and arms to complete strokes. They are able to use a sliding seat in their boats." Rowing Australia now uses the classification prefix established by FISA, "PR3".

== Events ==
Rowers in this classification compete in single and sculls for club, state, and national competitions. In international competitions, they compete in mixed cox fours sculls, with a maximum of two visually impaired rowers in the boat.

== Similar classifications ==
LTA-PD and LTA-B1, LTA-B2, and LTA-B3 are other classifications in this family.

== At the Paralympic Games ==
For the 2016 Summer Paralympics in Rio, the International Paralympic Committee had a zero classification at the Games policy. This policy was put into place in 2014, with the goal of avoiding last minute changes in classes that would negatively impact athlete training preparations. All competitors needed to be internationally classified with their classification status confirmed prior to the Games, with exceptions to this policy being dealt with on a case-by-case basis.

== Becoming classified ==
Classification is handled by FISA – International Rowing Federation.

Australians seeking classification through Rowing Australia as a visually impaired rower need to provide evidence of having been classified by an International Blind Sports Federation (IBSA) classifier or an Australian Paralympic Committee vision impairment classifier.

== See also ==
- Adaptive rowing
- Adaptive rowing classification
- Rowing at the 2008 Summer Paralympics
- Rowing at the 2012 Summer Paralympics
