= André van der Merwe (conductor) =

South African conductor, choral music arranger and composer

André van der Merwe is a conductor, choral music arranger, and composer from Durbanville, Western Cape, South Africa. He studied for his Bachelor of Music at the University of Cape Town but due to an injury, he changed his studies to a Bachelor of Drama (Directing) at the Stellenbosch University. He served as the chairperson of the National Artistic Committee for the 2018 World Choir Games held in Tshwane, South Africa.

He is currently the conductor of the Stellenbosch University Choir, the Stellenberg Girls Choir, and his adult choir, Voces Cordis. The Stellenbosch University Choir has been voted best in the world by Interkultur most of the years between 2012 and 2020.
