= World Sports Values Summit for Peace =

World Sports Values Summit for Peace is an international conference which is aimed at pursuing the value of the sports and discussing and disseminating how support can socially contribute to peace and respect for human rights.

== History ==
The first World Sports Values Summit for Peace was held in London under the theme of “Olympic Values: London and Beyond” from June 29 through July 1, 2012. The event highlighted the three overarching themes discussed at the two-day symposium: the meaning of Olympic values in the twenty-first century; how to realize them more effectively in sport, at the Games, and beyond; and how to leverage them for broader goals, nationally and internationally, including human rights and peace. In accordance with the inaugural Summit, a worldwide essay competition was conducted, wherein 265 students representing 61 nations exchanged perspectives regarding Olympic ideals and the ways in which sport, culture, education, and other public endeavors might actualize them.

The World Sports Values Summit for Peace in Tokyo, was held at Hotel New Otani Tokyo on July 18 and 19. Its objective was to draw attention to the constructive contributions that sports can make to the advancement of peace and human development. Following the event, it was announced that the World Sports Values Summit for Peace will continue to be organized on a regular basis.

The third Summit, World Sports Values Summit for Peace and Development was held on May 22 and 23, 2014 at the Headquarters of the United Nations. Delegates from a number of nations discussed about the constructive strategy to overcome challenges we face today through sports. It was announced that a partnership had been engaged between International Sports Promotion Society, the host organization of the second Summit, and United Nations Alliance of Civilizations, the host organization of the third Summit.

== List ==
No.	year	title	Venue	City	Country
1	2012	Olympic Values:London and Beyond	Georgetown UniversityBerkley Center	London	United Kingdom
2	2013	Tokyo World Sports Values Summit for Peace	Hotel New Otani Tokyo	Tokyo	Japan
3	2014	World Sports Values Summit for Peace and Development	Headquarters of the United Nations	New York City	United States
4	2015	World Sports Values Summit for Peace and Development	Cape Town International Convention Centre	Cape Town	South Africa
