= Para rowing classification =

Disability sports classification system used for rowing

Para rowing classification is the classification system used for Para rowing. It is based on functional ability and is broken down into three specific classifications. This system is governed by Federation Internationale de Societes d'Aviron. Eligible competitors have a physical or visual disability.

== Definition ==
Para rowing has three broad classifications based on a rower's functional ability. These classifications are PR1 (previously AS) for arms and shoulders, PR2 (previously TA) for trunk and arm mobility, PR3 (previously LTA) for legs, trunk and arms mobility. There was also previously a mixed boat classification called LTAIDMix4+, which included rowers with intellectual disabilities.

== Governance ==
The sport is governed by the Federation Internationale de Societes d'Aviron (FISA).

== Eligibility ==
As of 2012, people with visual and physical disabilities are eligible to compete in this sport.

British Rowing defines two types of rowers with disabilities:

- Para-Rowers - are eligible for the Paralympics. These are "rowers who have successfully been through the classification process and have been assigned a sport class."
- Adaptive Rowers - are not eligible for the Paralympics, but are eligible for all British Rowing competitions except for the British Rowing Championships. These are "rowers who have been through the classification process and have been confirmed as meeting a minimal disability.

== History ==
Adaptive rowing was taking place in France by 1971, with two classes of rowers initially participating: people with visual disabilities and people recovering from polio. People recovering from polio in France used boats with pontoons in order to increase their stability. Other changes were made to the boat with the development of a hinge-system to prevent rowers from tiring as easily. Blind rowers used the same boats during the 1970s and 1980s as their able-bodied counterparts but were guided on the course by a referee. Blind rowers were also encouraged to be in boats with sighted rowers, with the blind rowers serving as the stroke and the cox paying special attention to help the blinder rower. Classification was not something developed in France in this era as there was a focus on integrating rowers into the regular rowing community.

Adaptive rowing in the Netherlands began in 1979 with the founding of Stichting Roeivalidatie. There was not an emphasis on classification early on, but rather in integrating adaptive rowing with regular rowing inside of rowing clubs. Attempts were then made to customise equipment to suit an individual rower's specific needs as they related to their disability.

Adaptive rowing in the United States began in 1981 with the catamaran being the boat first used by rowers with a disability. By 1991, a classification system was in place for domestic competitions, but it was still under development. Many rowers also competed against their able-bodied counterparts during this period.

Adaptive rowing racing began in Australia in 1988. The first FISA recognised adaptive rowing World Cup event took place in 1991 and held in the Netherlands.

Early governance of the sport in Australia was done by the Rowing Council with supporting from the Australian Rowing Association. Early classifications were limited because of the limited number of rowers. In many of the earliest races inside Australia, there were two classes: fixed seats and sliding seats.

In 1991 in Great Britain, adaptive rowing was not a large concern. Rowing clubs endeavored to fully integrate rowers with disabilities into regular club races.

By 1991, an international classification system was attempting to be developed. These classes were:

- Q1: Laesion at C4-C6
- Q2: C7-T1
- P1: T2-T9
- P2: T10-L4
- A1: A single amputation
- A2: A double amputation
- A3: Respiratory problems.

This early system, called the Functional Classification System was not internationally agreed upon in part because it was not seen as entirely fair as it did not consider rower functionality and correct times based on that. At this time, there was also discussion about whether or not classifications should be created for rowers with intellectual disabilities. In 1992, the International Paralympic Committee formally took control of governance for disability sport.

== Classes ==
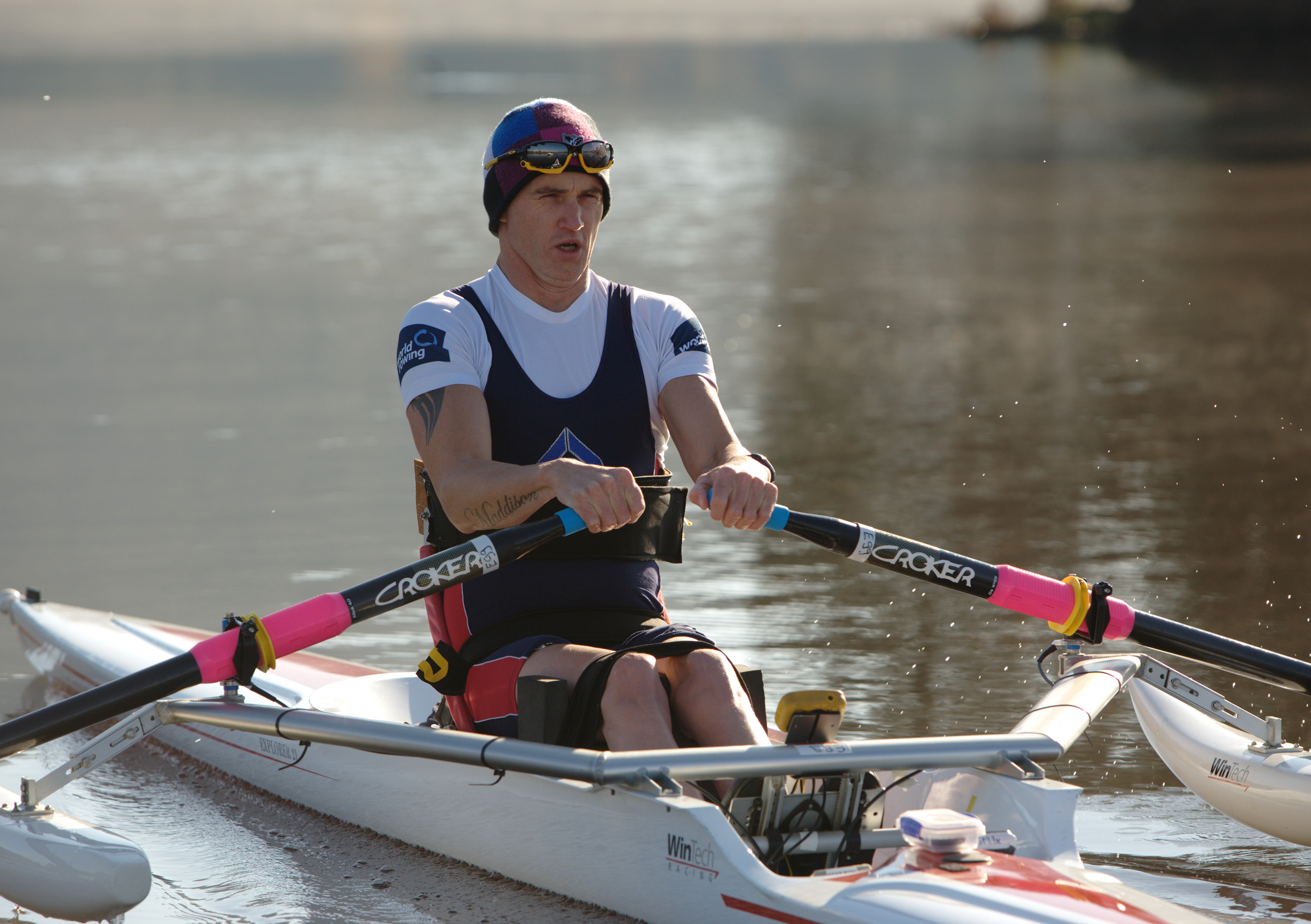
Erik Horrie, an Australian adaptive rower

Athletes are classified as follows:

PR3 (previously LTA). Legs, Trunks and Arms. Athletes are able to use a sliding seat and have function in their legs, trunks and arms to row. They may have a visual or physical impairment. Visually impaired athletes will wear blindfolds for vision impairment equality. The three categories of vision impairment used in FISA sport classification for Para rowing are B1, B2, and B3, which within PR3 (LTA) Para rowing are respectively known as PR3-B1, PR3-B2, PR3-B3.

PR2 (previously TA). Trunks and Arms. Athletes row with only their trunks and arm functional. They are unable to use a sliding seat due to impairment in the legs.

PR1 (previously AS). Arms and Shoulders. Athletes row with only their arms and shoulders, as they do not have the use of their trunks or legs.

Rules allow for a rower to compete in a higher functional class than they are currently classified. Rowers may not compete in lower classifications than they have been classified. In the Coxed Four, the maximum number of vision impaired rowers in a boat is two.

== Process ==
For Australian competitors in this sport, the sport and classification is managed the national sport federation with support from the Australian Paralympic Committee. There are three types of classification available for Australian competitors: Provisional, national and international. The first is for club level competitions, the second for state and national competitions, and the third for international competitions.

For the 2008 Summer Paralympics, classification assignment for this class was handled by FISA. For the 2016 Summer Paralympics in Rio, the International Paralympic Committee had a zero classification at the Games policy. This policy was put into place in 2014, with the goal of avoiding last minute changes in classes that would negatively impact athlete training preparations. All competitors needed to be internationally classified with their classification status confirmed prior to the Games, with exceptions to this policy being dealt with on a case-by-case basis. In case there was a need for classification or reclassification at the Games despite best efforts otherwise, rowing classification was scheduled for September 8 at Lagoa Stadium, and September 4 to 6 for visually impaired rowers.

== Future ==
Going forward, disability sport's major classification body, the International Paralympic Committee, is working on improving classification to be more of an evidence-based system as opposed to a performance-based system so as not to punish elite athletes whose performance makes them appear in a higher class alongside competitors who train less.
