= World Choir Games =

Global choral festival and competition

- Status: Active
- Genre: Choral music
- Frequency: Biennially
- Years active: 26
- Inaugurated: 7 July 2000
- Previous event: 6 – 16 August 2026, Helsingborg, Sweden
- Next event: 2027, Linz, Austria
- Organiser: Interkultur Foundation
- Website: Official website

The World Choir Games (formerly named the Choir Olympics) is the largest global choral festival and competition. Organised by the Interkultur Foundation for choirs from all over the world, regardless of their country of origin, race, genre of music or artistic ambitions, its motto is "Singing together brings nations together".

The Games originated from the idea to bring people together through singing in peaceful competition, showing that unity of nations through the arts can be effectively and illustratively demonstrated and challenged. The focus of the Games is on participation above winning, and it aims to inspire people to "experience the strength of interaction, challenging personality and community equally by singing together".

The most recent host of the Games was Helsingborg, Sweden, in 2026.

The next edition will be held in Linz, Austria, in 2027.

== General ==
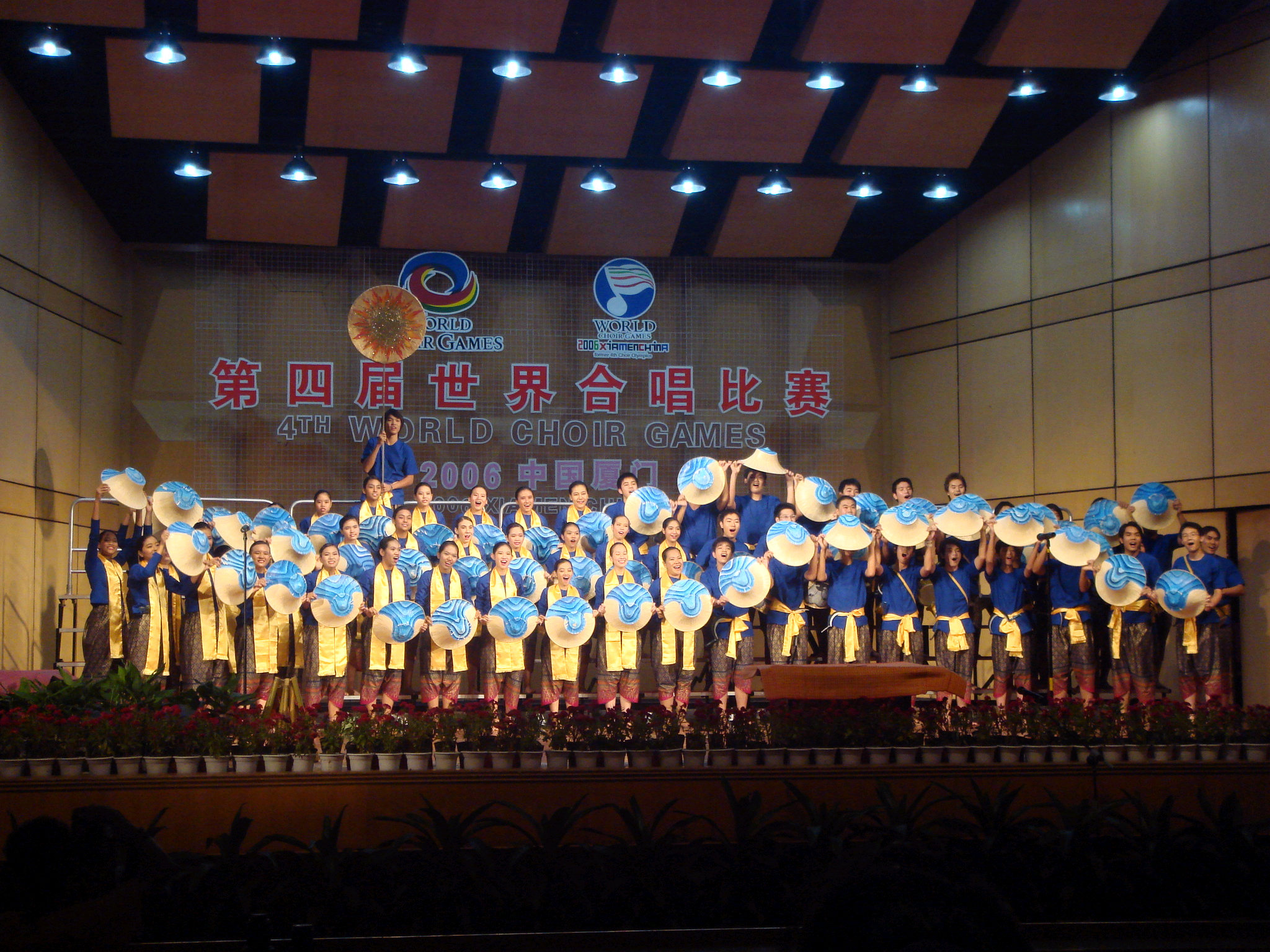
Saint John's Choir performing at the 4th World Choir Games in Xiamen, China

The choir singer Günter Titsch organised the first transnational choir competition with participants from Hungary and Germany in Budapest, beyond the then "Iron Curtain", as early as 1988. To further develop and expand the concept, Titsch then founded the support association Interkultur e.V. in 1990 as the parent organisation for the competitions. The association's name was intended to express the organisers' aim of uniting different cultures through their events. The first international Choir Olympics organised by Interkultur, later renamed World Choir Games, were held in Linz, Austria, in 2000, in the style of the Olympic Games, and involved choirs from 60 countries. An integral part of the Games is that they are not only open to ensembles with previous competitive experience. Choirs can decide for themselves whether to participate in the competition and are not dependent on a formal invitation from the initiators.

The Games are hosted biennially (every even year) in a pre-selected city across the globe, where choirs compete in selected categories. In 2012, for instance, there were 23 categories, and in 2016 there were 29 categories, among them "Senior Choirs" and "University Choirs". The Games consist of competitions in two classes (Champions and Open), festival concerts, artistic workshops, and various ceremonies. During the competition, choirs compete for gold, silver, bronze, or "Successful Participation" awards. Medals are awarded in the Champions Competition, and diplomas are awarded in the Open Competition. The choir that attains the highest point and a gold medal in a category during the Champions Competition is awarded the title of "Champion of the World Choir Games" for that category.

As part of the festival aspect of the Games choirs may also choose to participate in artistic workshops featuring renowned choral instructors, as well as friendship concerts and free public concerts where choirs share their music with choristers and audiences from different parts of the world. Ceremonies that form part of the Games include opening and closing ceremonies where up to 20,000 choristers join in a single venue, as well as the award ceremonies where the outcomes of the Open Competition and Champions Competition are announced. During the proceedings of the Games, the host for the next edition of the Games is usually announced.

== Competitions ==
Year	Competition	Host city	Dates	Participating countries	Participating choirs	Categories	Medals awarded		
Year	Competition	Host city	Dates	Participating countries	Participating choirs	Categories	Gold	Silver	Bronze
2000	1^{st} Choir Olympics	Linz, Austria	7–16 July	60	342	28	69	124	34
2002	2^{nd} Choir Olympics	Busan, South Korea	19–27 October	48	288	25	54	102	38
2004	3^{rd} Choir Olympics	Bremen, Germany	8–18 July	83	360	26	98	163	33
2006	4^{th} World Choir Games	Xiamen, China	15–26 July	80	400	26	75	140	39
2008	5^{th} World Choir Games	Graz, Austria	9–19 July	93	441	28	130	191	27
2010	6^{th} World Choir Games	Shaoxing, China	15–26 July	83	472	24	66	117	28
2012	7^{th} World Choir Games	Cincinnati, United States	4–14 July	64	362	23	106	139	19
2014	8^{th} World Choir Games	Riga, Latvia	9–19 July	73	460	29	229	174	16
2016	9^{th} World Choir Games	Sochi, Russia	6–16 July	73	283	29	116	86	4
2018	10^{th} World Choir Games	Tshwane, South Africa	4–14 July	62	300	28	134	92	12
2021	11^{th} World Choir Games	Antwerp and Ghent, Belgium	30 October–7 November	51	308	14	22	8	0
2023	12^{th} World Choir Games	Gangneung, South Korea	3–13 July	34	325	28	69	19	4
2024	13^{th} World Choir Games	Auckland, New Zealand	10–20 July	over 40	250	49	96	31	4
2026	14^{th} World Choir Games	Helsingborg, Sweden	6–16 August	40	160	18	110	22	0
2027	15^{th} World Choir Games	Linz, Austria							

== Tributes ==
The European Culture Award, which honours contributions to a peaceful Europe, has been awarded to the support association Interkultur in 2006 and 2016. At the World Choir Games 2010, then US President Barack Obama sent a message of greeting to the participating choirs, in which he acknowledged the contribution of the Games towards international understanding.

== Selected participant choirs ==
Listing of choirs that either achieved records in the Champions Competition of the WCG or whose participation in the event was special due to their background, composition or history. Participation in the event has been open to all choirs since its foundation.

- Stellenbosch University Choir - traditional choir from South Africa, best choir at the 2010, 2014, 2016 World Choir Games and number 1 on the Interkultur World Rankings since October 2012. The choir furthermore holds the World Choir Games world record with a score of 99 (out of a possible 100) points in the category "Mixed Choirs" at the World Choir Games 2014 in Riga (Latvia).
- Noor-e omid - first mixed-gender Afghan SATB choir (participation in WCG 2016)
- Amaranthe - Belgian women's choir that became World Choir Games champion for the second year in a row at WCG 2023.
- Changsha Dream of Wings Blind Children's Choir - Chinese choir of blind children who participated in the WCG 2016 and other events.
- Carmen Manet - Slovenian Women's Choir and Eurovision Choir of the Year 2017
- UMOJA Men's Chorus - US prison inmate choir that participated in the 2012 World Choir Games.
- Tianjin Dolphin Hearing Disabled Children's Choir - Chinese children's choir whose members have hearing impairments. (Participation in WCG 2016)

== Criticism ==
=== Alleged non-transparency ===
In connection to the Choir Olympics 2004 in Bremen, the support association was accused of "non-transparent financial dealings". According to newspaper reports, participating choirs were encouraged to arrange their accommodation via the agency M&C Music Contact, which was said to have a close relationship to INTERKULTUR e.V. The agency justified the criticised price level by stating that the accommodation packages offered would also include a contribution to the organisational expenses, free admission to the competition concerts and a complimentary city tour. Participants from "poorer countries" would also have had to pay a reduced participation fee. In this context, the association organ of the German Singers' Association insinuated a lack of distinction between commercial and non-profit activities. Günter Titsch, the founder of the Choir Olympics and chairman of Interkultur, pointed out that during the event in Bremen the sponsoring association had provided free accommodation and meals for 2000 members of children's and youth choirs, but admitted that Interkultur would work for a better organisation and a clearer demarcation at future Olympics. The public attorney's office in Giessen stated on 18 September 2004 that they did not see any grounds for investigation, as all participants had been informed in advance of the related expenses.
