= International Blind Golf Association =

Organization

- Abbreviation: IBGA
- Formation: 1998
- Type: Non-profit
- Services: Blind Golf
- Affiliations: Japanese Blind Golf Association
- Website: internationalblindgolf.com

International Blind Golf Association (IBGA) (in Japanese) was established in 1998 as a disabled sports entity to organize, acknowledge and support international blind golf (visually impaired and blind golf) tournaments. As of 2014, it has around 500 registered golfers.

== History ==
In 1996, Haruhisa Handa who was the founder of Japanese Blind Golf Association appealed to blind golf associations around the world to set up a governing organization. In 1997, the World Blind Golfers Conference was held in Perth, Australia, where representatives from six countries participated to propose the articles of association and handicap system. In 1998, the proposal was resolved at a meeting held during the 5th Blind Golf World Championship in Florida, US, so that a global governing organization could be established. Handa was elected as the first president, and David Blyth from Australia became the first chairman (responsible in administration).

There were eight organizations that took part in the World Blind Golfers’ Conference held in 1997 from 6 countries; Japan, United States, Canada, Australia, Ireland, England, Scotland and Northern Ireland.

As of 2014, International Blind Golf Association has 18 member organizations from 16 countries including 4 associate organizations from 4 countries.

== Tour ==
Title	Country
ISPS HANDA World Blind Golf Championship	
The ISPS HANDA Ressmeyer Vision Cup	Italy
Blind Golf Japan Open Championship	Japan
ISPS HANDA US Blind Open Championships	United States
ISPS HANDA British Blind Golf Open	England
ISPS HANDA Canadian Blind Golf Open	Canada
ISPS HANDA Irish Blind golf Open	Ireland
ISPS HANDA Australian Blind Open	Australia
ISPS HANDA Italian Blind Open	Italy
South African Blind Golf Open	South Africa
Handa Cup	United States

== Members ==
- Japanese Blind Golf Association (JBGA)
- United States Blind Golf Association (USBGA)
- Northern Ireland Blind Golf
- Scottish Blind Golf Society
- English Blind Golf Association
- Germany Blind Golf Association
- Ireland Blind Golf
- Republic of South Africa Blind Golf Association
- Australian Blind Golf Association
- Canadian Blind Golf Association
- Hong Kong Blind Golf Association
- South Korea Blind Golf Association
- Italian Blind Golf Association
- Austrian Blind Golf Association

=== Associate members ===
- France
- Israel
- Malaysia
- Netherlands
