= British Blind Sport =

- Founded: 1975
- Location: Leamington Spa, Warwickshire, United Kingdom
- Region served: England; Scotland; Wales; N. Ireland
- Method: Direct Aid / Program Funding
- Website: British Blind Sport Homepage

British Blind Sport (BBS) is a British charity that makes sport and recreational activities accessible to people who are visually impaired. The charity enables blind and partially sighted people to experience the same sporting opportunities as sighted people. Since its establishment in 1975, BBS has become a voice for visually impaired people in the world of sport and leisure, both in the United Kingdom and on an international level. It also leads in the UK with sight classification for elite and paralympic athletes. Its headquarters are in Leamington Spa, Warwickshire.

The charity was founded in 1975 as the British Association for Sporting and Recreational Activities for the Blind (BASRAB) and changed its name to British Blind Sport in 1989.

In March 2013, Tony Larkin, former sports coach at the Royal National College for the Blind, who led the British blind football team at the 2012 Summer Paralympics was appointed Patron of British Blind Sport. Noel Thatcher, Paralympian medal winner is also a Patron.
