= Rowing Australia =

Governing body of rowing in Australia

- Sport: Rowing
- Jurisdiction: Australia
- Abbreviation: RA
- Founded: 1925
- Affiliation: FISA
- Headquarters: Yarralumla, ACT
- President: Stephen Donnelley
- CEO: Sarah Cook

Official website
- www.rowingaustralia.com.au
- (Australia)

Rowing Australia (RA) is the governing body for the sport of rowing in Australia.

Established in 1925, it is the only organisation recognised by the Federation Internationale des Societies d’Aviron (FISA), the Australian Sports Commission (ASC), and the Australian Olympic Committee (AOC), to conduct rowing activities in, and on behalf of Australia.

== History ==
RA was initially established on 1 May 1925 as the Australian Amateur Rowing Council. It was incorporated on 15 November 1982, changed its name to Australian Rowing Council Inc in 1984, changed its name to Rowing Australia Inc on 2 March 1996 and finally became a public company in January 2007 and so became Rowing Australia Ltd.

Prior to 1925, the Interstate Championships and representation at the Olympic Games were managed by the State Associations. A proposal to form the Australian Amateur Rowing Council failed at the 1909 inter-state conference, in favour of the continuation of the conference system.

Regulations were brought into effect for the conduct of the Intercolonial and Interstate Championships well prior to the formation of RA. While there were many debates over rules from the first race, the first request for a conference came from New South Wales in February 1887, in order to discuss the possibility of sending a combined crew from all colonies to compete in England.

== Members ==
Rowing Australia and its affiliates represent in excess of 15,000 active members ranging from young rowers at school through to those at universities and in the wider community right through to veterans rowing.

Rowing Australia member associations operate in seven states with over 185 schools and 156 clubs offering rowing programs.

== Competition ==
RA is responsible for selection of representative Australian teams for the Olympic Games, World Championships, World Under 23 Championships, Trans Tasman teams and Junior World Championships. Rowing Australia also organises four regattas which are conducted in Australia at the national level:

- Australian Rowing Championships
- Australian Masters Rowing Championships

Previous events include:

- Youth Cup
- Australian Youth Olympic Festival
