= Martha Crenshaw =

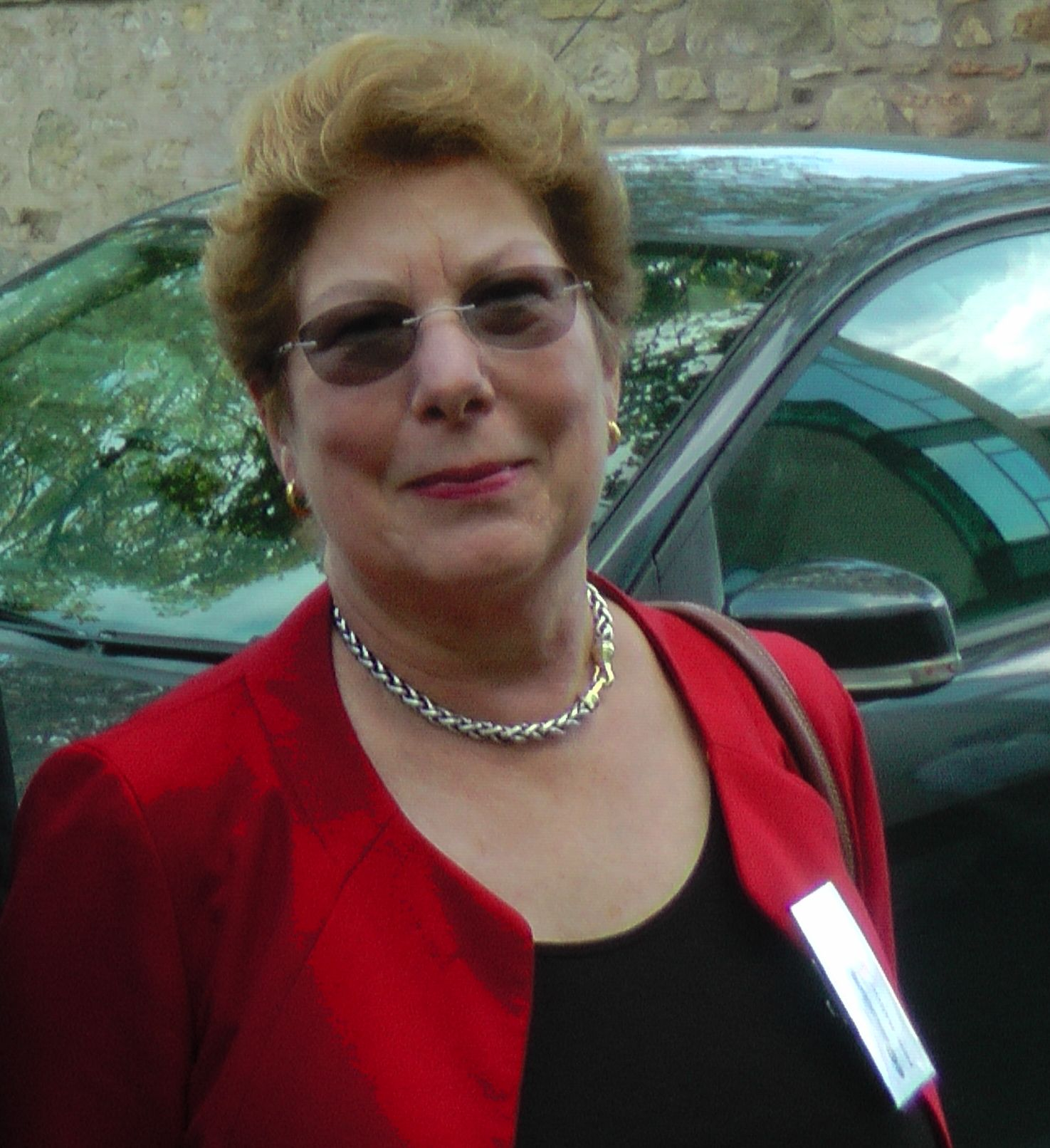
Crenshaw at CSTPV, University of St. Andrews in September 2014

Martha Crenshaw FBA (born September 2, 1945) is a political scientist who is prominent for her research on terrorism. She is professor of political science at Stanford University since 2007, as well as senior fellow at the Freeman Spogli Institute for International Studies (FSI) and Center for International Security and Cooperation (CISAC).

Crenshaw was one of the pioneers in terrorism studies along with Paul Wilkinson, Ariel Merari, Bruce Hoffman and Alex Schmid. She has a B.A. from Newcomb College of Tulane University in 1967. She obtained a PhD from the Department of Government at the University of Virginia in 1973.

From 1977 to 78 she earned National Endowment for the Humanities Fellowship for Independent Study and was fellow at Fellow, Richardson Institute for Conflict and Peace Research. Crenshaw's post doctoral fellowship at the Russell Sage Foundation (1987 - 1988) and she also earned the Harry Frank Guggenheim Foundation Research Grant (1987–88) and Ford Foundation Project Grant (1987–89). From 1987 she was the Institute for East-West Security Studies Scholar for a year and earned Outstanding Alumna Award from Newcomb College in 1989 and Pew Faculty Fellowship (1992–93).

Crenshaw was the Colin and Nancy Campbell Professor of Global Issues and Democratic Thought and professor of government at Wesleyan University in Middletown, where she taught from 1987 to 2007. She served on the executive board of Women in International Security and is a former president and councilor of the International Society of Political Psychology (ISPP). She coordinated the working group on political explanations of terrorism for the 2005 Club de Madrid International Summit on Democracy, Terrorism and Security. In 2005-2006 she was a Guggenheim Fellow.

Since 2005 she has been a lead investigator with the National Consortium for the Study of Terrorism and Responses to Terrorism known as START at the University of Maryland, funded by the Department of Homeland Security. In 2009 she was awarded a grant from the National Science Foundation, Department of Defense Minerva Initiative for a project on "mapping terrorist organizations." She serves on the editorial boards of the journals International Security, Political Psychology, Security Studies, Dynamics of Asymmetric Conflict, and Terrorism and Political Violence. She is currently a member of the Committee on Evaluating the Effectiveness of the Global Nuclear Detection Architecture of the National Academies of Science.

She was elected as a Corresponding Fellow of the British Academy in 2015.

== Selected publications ==
- Dealing with Terrorism - USIP Press (Forthcoming)
- Will Threats Deter Nuclear Terrorism? - Stanford Security Studies (September 19, 2012)
- Reaction Time (Commentary) Foreign Policy (November 12, 2012)
- Explaining Terrorism: Causes, Processes and Consequences, Routledge, (October 8, 2010)
- Trajectories of Terrorism: Attack Patterns of Foreign Groups That Have Targeted The United States, 1970-2004 (Journal Article co authored with Gary LaFree, Sue-Ming Yang) Criminology & Public Policy, Vol. 8, (August 2009)
- The Consequences of Counterterrorism, Russel Sage Foundation (February 2010)
- Encyclopedia of World Terrorism 3 vols. (edited With John Pimlott) Sharpe (1997)
- Terrorism in Africa. Maxwell Macmillan International (1994)
- Terrorism in Context. Pennsylvania State University Press (1995)
- Terrorism, Legitimacy, and Power: The Consequences of Political Violence. Middletown: Wesleyan University Press (1983)
- Revolutionary Terrorism: The FLN in Algeria, 1954-1962. Stanford: Hoover Institution Press (1978)
