= Kenichi Itō (political scientist) =

Japanese political scientist (1938–2022)

Ito Ken'ichi
- Born: 7 March 1938; Tokyo, Japan
- Died: 14 March 2022 (aged 84)
- Scientific career
- Fields: International relations Political science Strategic Studies
- Institutions: Japan Forum on International Relations; Global Forum of Japan; Council on East Asian Community

Ito Ken'ichi (伊藤 憲一, Itō Ken'ichi; 7 March 1938 – 14 March 2022) was a Japanese diplomat and political scientist who was engaged in international politics and strategic studies. He was president and CEO of the Japan Forum on International Relations (JFIR) since it was founded in 1987, and served as chairman of the Global Forum of Japan (GFJ), chairman of the Council on East Asian Community (CEAC), and vice president of the Worldwide Support for Development (WSD). He was professor emeritus of Aoyama Gakuin University and held an Honorary Doctorate from the University of Cambodia.

== Life ==
Itō was born in Tokyo in 1938. He graduated from Hitotsubashi University Law School in 1960. He joined the Japanese Ministry of Foreign Affairs (MOFA) in 1960. After studying at the Harvard Graduate School of Arts and Sciences, he served as third to first Secretaries in the Japanese Embassies in Moscow, Manila, and Washington, D.C., and as director of the First Southeast Asian Division until he left MOFA in 1977.

After MOFA, while teaching international politics at Aoyama Gakuin University (1980–2006), he concurrently held many other positions such as the Tokyo representative of the Center for Strategic and International Studies (CSIS) (1980–1987). He was also founder-president of such international-relations-based non-profit think tanks, as the Japan Forum on International Relations, the Global Forum of Japan, and the Council on East Asian Community.

He was the author of roughly twenty books, which include: Kokka to Senryaku (State and Strategy), Taikoku to Senryaku (Great Powers and Strategy), Futatsu no Shogeki to Nihon (Japan's Response to the Two Shocks), Chiheisen wo Koete (Beyond the Horizon), and Cho-kindai no Shogeki (The Impact of Postmodern Civilization), and Shin Senso-ron (The Advent of the No-War Era).

Itō died from pneumonia on 14 March 2022, at the age of 84.

== Thought ==
Itō's thoughts on war and peace are systematically developed in his books such as State and Strategy (1985) and Advent of Non-War Era (2007). Itō posits that there is an origin to the concept of "war," suggesting that "war" is a social phenomenon, that occurs only when certain social conditions are met in a similar manner as they occur in other social phenomena, such as migration and/or business cycles.

Therefore, he believed the logic that "war" could be subjected to control by managing the social conditions that surround human society. Itō said that war, rather than being a genetically embedded, physiological phenomenon, is a social phenomenon that arose about 10,000 years ago when a number of social changes took place. Itō said that at that time, this change was caused by the development of human society from an unsettled hunter economy (Old Stone Age) to a settled farmer economy (New Stone Age). At this stage, prototype states referred to by Itō as "independent political units (IPU)" evolved from hunting kin groups into cultivating territorial groups, resulting in the conversion of the nature of the relations among IPU from the absence of international relations to the presence of such relations. According to Itō, this is the origin of war as a social phenomenon. He said that there was a "Pre-War Era" that extended up to the end of the Old Stone Age. This was followed by "War Era" that lasted until the end of the World War II, followed by a "No-War Era" from then up to the present and into the future.

Paraphrasing a proposition by Joseph Frankel, international political scientist, that "an international system exists only as a point between a political unity and a complete absence of such a unity," and another by Nakayama Ichiro, economist, that "general equilibrium is an ultimate state of interdependent economic phenomena having moved inevitably from absence of unity to unity," Itō presents a concluding theory that "any political systems have a built-in tendency to move from lower (national, regional) to higher (global) level of political unity.”

In reality, while the "War Era" had almost realized the establishment of the five Regional Hegemonies, by its innate logic the first "Weapon Revolution" comprising the invention of bows/arrows, and swords/maces, this "Era" was demolished by the external shock of the logic of the second "Weapon Revolution" comprising the invention of guns and cannons. Thus, the history of "war" came to witness an advent of the "World Partitioning War Period," the second phase of "War Era," with the discovery of the New World by Christopher Columbus in 1492. However, the pursuit of the tendency to move from lower (national to regional) to higher (global) level of political unity by the logic of the second "Weapon Revolution" has become impossible because of the realization the third "Weapon Revolution" includes the invention of the nuclear arms.

Humanity parted from the "War Era" when the Kellogg–Briand No-War Pact of 1928 was signed, and after the UN Charter of 1945, etc. An act of aggression, under whatever name, has been declared illegal and humanity opened the door of the "No-War Era." However, a global "No-War" regime has not yet been fully completed as the United Nations is effectively blocked from acting by the veto power of five countries. This underlines the importance of advanced democracies including Japan, that share such values as freedom and democracy. If united, they could lead the way to, and herald the advent of, the "No-War Era" in the history of humanity. On the other hand, actors, governmental or otherwise, who attempt to change the status quo by force must be criticized for their contradiction of the maintenance and development of the "No-war Community.”

Itō maintains that within the 21st century global system what is to be called a "No-War Community" is currently being built. In this sense, he sides with those who believe in the progress of history. In this view of history, the "No-War Community" signifies an unprecedented stage attained by humanity.

== See also ==
- Worldwide Support for Development
- Tekiya
- Pacific Forum CSIS
- East Asian Community
