= Mengly J. Quach =

Cambodian businessman and philanthropist (born 1969)

Mengly Jandy Quach GOM
- គួច ម៉េងលី
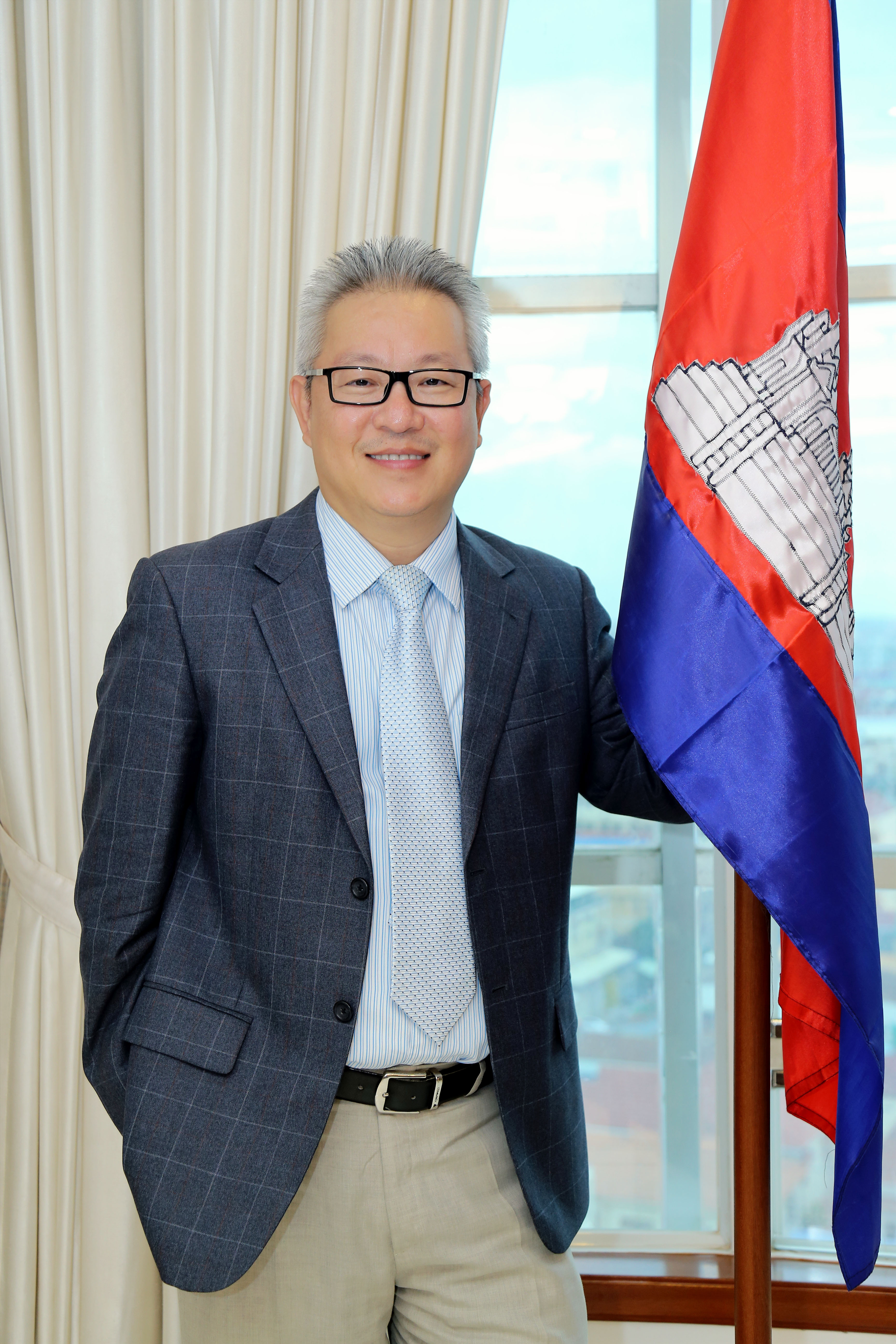
- Quach in 2015
- Born: 25 March 1969 (age 57); Battambang Province, Cambodia
- Education: UC Berkeley; Spartan Health Sciences University; UMass Amherst
- Occupations: Physician; entrepreneur
- Years active: 2005–present
- Known for: Mengly J. Quach Education
- Spouse: Lyhong Ung (m. 2004)
- Children: 2
- Website: mjqeducation.edu.kh

Signature
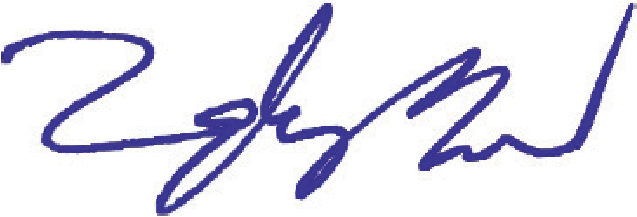

Mengly Jandy Quach GOM (Khmer: គួច ម៉េងលី, Kuŏch Méngli [kuəc meːŋliː]; born 25 March 1969) is a Cambodian businessman and philanthropist, and founder of the Mengly J. Quach Education. He is also a survivor of the Cambodian genocide.

== Early life and education ==
Quach was born in Battambang Province, Cambodia on 25 March 1969. During and after Khmer Rouge regime, Quach survived the Dangrek genocide in Dângrêk Mountains areas. After initially being pushed back by the Thai Royal Army, his family managed to find refuge in Thailand in their second attempt to escape Cambodia. Quach and his family were resettled in the United States in 1984 from Khao-I-Dang Refugee Camp after the war after their first attempt to journey to Nong Chan Refugee Camp in 1979 had failed.

Quach was raised and educated in California. He attended University of California, Berkeley in 1991 for pre-med and received his Doctor of Medicine in General Medicine from Spartan Health Sciences University in 1998. Quach also completed his medical clerkship at the University of Illinois Hospital in Chicago. He received his master's degree in Public Health Practice from the University of Massachusetts Amherst in 2007. Quach was a professor at the Cleveland Chiropractic College in California until 2002.

== Career ==
In 2002, Quach returned to Cambodia where he worked as public health advisor of Integrated Management of Childhood Illness (IMCI) for Partners for Development and taught at the Pannasastra University of Cambodia and the University of Cambodia.

In 2005, Quach founded Mengly J. Quach Education. Its Aii Language Center and American Intercon School to provide education, health care, food, media and financial services. By 2023, his educational programs had grown from a single classroom with just four students into one of Cambodia's biggest educational networks, with over twenty nine school buildings, over 20,000 students.

Quach was the owner and on the advisory board of ThmeyThmey.com, an online news publisher. It was launched in 2012 as part of Mengly J. Quash Holdings. In May 2017, Quach resigned from the advisory board of Thmey Thmey. In his resignation letter, he said he sold his shares and has no more connection with Thmey Thmey.

After he criticized the integrity of Cambodian doctors and their treatments, his application to open a medical practice and university was declined in 2017.

== Philanthropy ==
Quach founded MJQ Foundation in 2005. He is also known for a range of philanthropic endeavours, from sponsoring spelling contests to sponsoring education or providing relief during the economic crisis caused by the COVID-19 outbreak. During a trip to Europe, he made a donation in favour of migrants in Ventimiglia at the border between Italy and France, remembering that he himself was helped when he had to flee his country.

== Positions ==
As an oknha, he has insisted on the importance of virtuous leadership in Khmer society, through many publications in virtue ethics and business. In partnership with the Office of United Nations High Commissioner for Human Rights in Cambodia, he defends the idea that businesses should care more about human rights in Cambodia.

For that reason, Quach has voiced criticism against crony capitalism and abuse of power by certain okhna in Cambodia "I think this re-drafting should be considered because some Oknha have used their titles in the past to protect themselves from the consequences of committing immoral acts, which create discontent among the public. We know that some oknhas have committed violence, or had crooked business dealings. Some have even been involved in deforestation. The actions of those who hold this title affects the honour of the King who bestows it."

Quach was an elected board member of Transparency International Cambodia during 2010 - 2013. He was also known by a controversy for criticizing the Cambodia's public health in 2016, saying that nine in ten doctors in the country were sub-par and treated their patients badly. He also commented that Cambodia's system for educating doctors remains weak and the training for doctors in Cambodia is very short. His comments prompted a government-affiliated doctors’ association to demand an apology and retraction.

== Personal life ==
Quach lives in Phnom Penh with his wife and their two daughters.

== Recognition ==
In 2009, Quach was made Knight Grand Officer in the Royal Order of Monisaraphon and given the Khmer Royal title of Oknha by His Majesty King Norodom Sihamoni. In 2021, he was given the Khmer Royal title of Neak Oknha by His Majesty King Norodom Sihamoni for his community, charity and philanthropic works.

== Selected publications ==
- Dharmendra, Singh K.; Quach, Mengly J. (2016). Dr. Mengly, Coffee and Me: Healthy Conversations. Mengly J. Quach University Press. ISBN 978-9924-508-01-4
- Quach, Mengly J. (2016). Dr. Mengly's Business Concepts. Mengly J. Quach University Press. ISBN 978-9924-508-02-1
- Quach, Mengly J. (2016). You Are The Good. Better. Best. Mengly J. Quach University Press. ISBN 978-9924-508-02-1, LCCN 2017-355440
- Quach, Mengly J. (2018). Mengly J. Quach's 108 Ideal Practices. Mengly J. Quach University Press. ISBN 978-9924-508-12-0
- Quach, Mengly J. (2018). Dangrek Mountains …unforgettable. Mengly J. Quach University Press. ISBN 978-9924-508-11-3
- Quach, Mengly J. (2019). Mengly J. Quach's Business Ideas. Mengly J. Quach University Press. ISBN 978-9924-508-14-4
- Quach, Mengly J. (2020). Quach M. J., Poems from the Heart. Mengly J. Quach University Press. ISBN 978-9924-508-20-5
- Quach, Mengly J. (2020). Quach M. J., The Philosophy Collection. Mengly J. Quach University Press. ISBN 978-9924-508-17-5
- Quach, Mengly J. (2023). "Shortcut". Mengly J. Quach University Press, March, 2023

== Sources ==
- Oeur S., Torn V., Sem R., Hang P., Yeng Chh., On K., A Collection of Short Stories, My Role Model Oknha Dr. Mengly J. Quach, Mengly J. Quach University Press, January 2020
- Oeur S., Dr. Mengly J. Quach's Poems and Me, Mengly J. Quach University Press, August 2019
- Hang P., How I came to know Dr. Mengly Jandy Quach, Mengly J. Quach University Press, August 2019
