= GFJ =

GFJ can refer to:

- Grapefruit juice
- Global Forum of Japan, organization chaired by Japanese political scientist Kenichi Itō
- Grapefruit Jungle, American IPA beer
- Zenith G.F.J., watch collection by Swiss watchmaking company Zenith
