= Mengly J. Quach Education =

Company based in Phnom Penh, Cambodia

- Company type: Private company
- Industry: Education
- Founded: 2005
- Founder: Mengly J. Quach
- Headquarters: Phnom Penh, Cambodia
- Key people: Mengly J. Quach (Founder, Chairman and CEO)
- Products: Education Services
- Subsidiaries: Aii Language Center; American Intercon School
- Website: www.mjqeducation.edu.kh

Mengly J. Quach Education is the parent company of Aii Language Center (Aii) and American Intercon School (AIS), founded in 2005 by Mengly J. Quach.

== History ==
In 2005, Mengly J. Quach founded Mengly J. Quach Education. The company's subsidiaries, Aii Language Center and American Intercon School, engage in education, health care, food, media, and financial services. It started with 20 students in 2005 and by 2023, had grown into one of Cambodia's largest educational networks, with fifteen school buildings, over 20,000 students, more than 2,300 staff, and 55,000 alumni. Mengly J Quach Education Plc was officially listed on the Cambodia Securities Exchange (CSX) on June 28, 2023, becoming the 11th equity-listed firm to issue its IPO on the kingdom’s bourse. The company issued 9,966,127 shares at a share cost of 2,080 riels ($0.5), raising $5 million.

== Aii Language Center ==
Aii Language Center (Aii) is a North American Standard-based center specializing in languages and is one of the largest English language centers in Cambodia. Aii offers various programs, including English (offered for kids, teens and adults), diploma courses, Chinese language programs, Test of English as a Foreign Language (TOEFL) preparation courses, and TESOL House. It operates in ten campuses in Phnom Penh, one campus in Siem Reap, and one campus in Takeo, Cambodia.

=== History ===
Aii Language Center (Aii) is a subsidiary of Mengly J. Quach Education and a sister company of American Intercon School. It was founded by Mengly Jandy Quach in Phnom Penh in 2005. It started with only 20 students in 2005 and by 2022, had over 9,000 students studying in 6 campuses in Phnom Penh, one campus in Siem Reap, and one campus in Takeo, with over 50,000 alumni. In 2025, the center's expansion brought more than 11,500 students.

=== During the COVID-19 Period ===
Since the pandemic began, most schools struggled with tuition fees, wages, rents, utilities, and loan interests, leading to operational suspensions. Rental fees were a significant issue, and while there was some government and financial institution support, it was insufficient. Educational institutions like Aii relied on multiple revenue streams, including school bus fees, food, uniforms, books, and other administrative fees. Aii faced financial hardships during the COVID-19 period. In a meeting of the Cambodian Higher Education Association, Mengly J. Quach stated that he negotiated with building owners, but like other school owners, he was unsuccessful. Many private schools in Cambodia were expected to go bankrupt due to loans taken to open their schools. Aii provided teachers and staff with monthly support and supplies, such as rice, face masks, sanitizers, and preventive hygiene training, amid the financial struggles. In July 2020, Mengly J. Quach emphasized the challenges in reopening schools during the pandemic.

== American Intercon School ==
American Intercon School (AIS) is a North American standard-based school. It is the largest general education institution in Cambodia with programs ranging from kindergarten to high school. It operates in seven campuses in Phnom Penh, one campus in Siem Reap, and one campus in Takeo. American Intercon School (AIS) is one of the core businesses of Mengly J. Quach Education.

=== History ===
AIS was founded in 2005 by Mengly J. Quach in Phnom Penh. It started with 20 students in 2005 and by 2022, had over 9,000 students studying in 6 campuses in Phnom Penh, one campus in Siem Reap, and one campus in Takeo, with over 50,000 alumni.
