= Kao Kim Hourn =

Secretary-General of ASEAN since 2023

Kao Kim Hourn CM
- កៅ គឹមហួន
- Kao in 2026

15th Secretary-General of ASEAN
- Incumbent
- Assumed office 1 January 2023
- Preceded by: Lim Jock Hoi

Personal details
- Born: May 28, 1966 (age 60) Koh Sotin, Kampong Cham, Cambodia
- Education: Baylor University (BA); Ohio University (MA); University of Hawaii at Manoa (PhD)
- Occupation: Diplomat; educator
- Website: www.kaokimhourn.com/eng/
- Kao Kim Hourn's voice Kao speaking about ASEAN; Recorded 26 August 2025

Kao Kim Hourn CM (Khmer: កៅ គឹមហួន, romanized: Kau Kœ̆m Huŏn [kaw kɨm huən]; born 28 May 1966) is a Cambodian diplomat who has served as the Secretary-General of ASEAN since 2023. He previously served two terms as Minister Delegate attached to the Prime Minister of the Kingdom of Cambodia (2013-2022) and two terms as Secretary of State of Cambodia's Ministry of Foreign Affairs and International Cooperation (2003-2013). Kao is a member of the Supreme National Economic Council, senior fellow at the Jeffrey Cheah Institute on Southeast Asia, and a member of the Global Council of The Asia Society.

After being educated in the United States, Kao returned to Cambodia in 1993, and has been involved in Cambodian public service and think tanks. He played an integral role in Cambodia's entrance into ASEAN in 1999, and has served as Advisor to the Ministry of Foreign Affairs and International Cooperation from 2001 to 2003 and as Secretary of State for the Ministry of Foreign Affairs and International Cooperation from 2004-2013.

Kao also founded The University of Cambodia (UC) in 2003, which became a top-ranking Cambodian university under his tenure as President. He has since helped to found two think tanks: the Asia Economic Forum, and the Asian Faiths Development Dialogue. In addition, he also helped to found the South East Asia Television network and radio station, known as SEATV and Radio.

In 2014, Kao founded the Techo Sen School of Government and International Relations at The University of Cambodia, providing training for administrators, policy makers, and young leaders. In 2015, he founded the College of Media and Communications at The University of Cambodia to promote journalism and communications education, and provide students with hands on training at Southeast Asia Television (SEATV) and Radio (FM 106). In 2018, He also founded the School of Foreign Languages, which offers full degrees in English, Chinese, Korean, Japanese, and French and provides short courses in Thai and German. Additionally, he established the School of Creative Arts, aimed to preserve and celebrate Cambodia's rich history of art, song, and dance. In August 2022, Kao was appointed as the next Secretary-General of ASEAN at the plenary session of the 55th ASEAN Foreign Ministers' Meeting, and in November 2022 at the ASEAN Summit, all ASEAN leaders supported his appointment. He is the first Cambodian citizen to hold this position since Cambodia joined ASEAN.

== Education ==
After the Cambodian Civil War, the Khmer Rouge seized power and committed the Cambodian genocide. Kao received very little formal education during his childhood due to the unstable and violent conditions in Cambodia at the time. His family was granted refugee status in 1981, and eventually relocated to Herndon, Virginia. There, Kao enrolled in high school. He was 16 years old at the time and had very little educational experience and no English training. However, he was quite successful and graduated with a high school diploma with scholastic excellence three years later, in 1985. He then attended Baylor University in Waco, Texas, where he did his B.A. in Asian studies. He received a National Fellowship Scholarship to Ohio University in Athens for his master's degree program. And in 1991, he graduated with two master's degrees - one in political science and the other in international affairs. Additionally, he holds a Ph.D. in political science from the University of Hawaii at Manoa in Honolulu. He received an Honorary Doctoral Degree in Public Service from Ohio University in 2007, as well as another Honorary Doctoral Degree in Literature from the Kalinga Institute of Industrial Technology (KIIT University) of India in 2014. In June 2023, Kao was conferred an Honorary Doctoral Degree in Political Science from Busan University of Foreign Studies, South Korea. He was also conferred the honorary title of Guest Professor by Zhengzhou University in recognition of his achievements in the field of political science and international affairs in October 2023.

== Professional career ==
He was appointed as director of the Khmer International Relations Institute, and held that office from 1993 to 1994. During his time as director, he developed the Cambodia Public Accountability and Transparency project (CPAT) with funding support from the Asia Foundation. The project, one of the first counter-corruption projects in the nation, did not receive sufficient funding, and thus could not produce significant results. The project was later transformed into the Center for Social Development (CSD) when Kao became Director of the think-tank, the Cambodian Institute for Cooperation and Peace (CICP), launched earlier by His Royal Highness Prince Norodom Sirivudh in cooperation with the German Friedrich-Ebert-Foundation (Phnom Phenh Post 09. September 1994).

Kao worked as CICP's first executive director for 10 years, until 2004, though he has remained as a Member of the Board of Directors. The CICP helped support Cambodia in becoming a member of the Association of Southeast Asian Nations (ASEAN) in 1999, the ASEAN Institutes of Strategic and International Studies and the Council for Security Cooperation in Asia Pacific (CSCAP) during Kao's tenure. He has published many books on ASEAN and Cambodian-ASEAN relations, and gained significant experience in ASEAN through the activities of the ASEAN Institutes of Strategic and International Studies. His time at CICP also involved significant interactions with the Royal Government of Cambodia, as an advisor to the Ministry of Foreign Affairs and International Cooperation.

Kao served as Advisor to the Minister of Foreign Affairs and International Cooperation of the Royal Government of Cambodia from 1996 to 1998, and again from 2001 to 2004 with the rank of Undersecretary of State. He also became a member of the Supreme National Economic Council with the rank of minister when SNEC was founded in 1999 and has been a member since then.

In 2003, Kao founded The University of Cambodia (UC). Kao was inspired to create a Cambodian higher education institution modeled in a similar way to the United States that focuses on developing students' critical thinking and problem solving skills. He now serves as Chairman of the Board of Trustees.

The University of Cambodia has also established two think-tanks under the leadership of Kao: the Asia Economic Forum (AEF) and the Asia Faiths Development Dialogue both of which fall under the umbrella of the university.

Kao is a founding committee member, and vice-chairman of AEF, which was established by UC in May 2005. AEF is a think-tank promoting policy dialogue around major issues facing the Asia-Pacific region. AEF has generally been held on an annual basis in Phnom Penh.

Kao is also the Secretary General of the Asian Faiths Development Dialogue (AFDD), which was founded by Dr. Haruhisa Handa in December 2006. The purpose of AFDD is to enhance dialogue between different faith groups, and bring faith communities together to achieve humanitarian and development aims.

In 2004, he was appointed as Secretary of State for the Ministry of Foreign Affairs and International Cooperation a position he held until 2013. During his tenure as Secretary of State, Kao worked extensively with ASEAN, developing relationships and managing Cambodia's participation in the organization's many mechanisms. As such, he was a key player in the development and negotiation of the ASEAN Charter, as the Cambodian representative to the ASEAN High Level Task Force on the Drafting of the ASEAN Charter. In addition to ASEAN, Kao was also responsible for the ASEAN Plus Three, the ASEAN Plus One mechanisms, the ASEAN Regional Forum (ARF), the East Asia Summit (EAS), as well as the Asia-Europe Meeting (ASEM)

Since 2006, Kao has served as the Vice Chairman for the Advisory Board of the International Relations Institute of Cambodia at the Office of the Council of Ministers.

In 2007, South East Asia Television and South East Asia Radio, popularly known as SEATV, were established by Kao, Headquartered in UC's Phnom Penh campus,

He has also served as a member of the Standing Committee of the Cambodian Red Cross for two five year terms, from 2008 to 2018. He was Alternative Member for Cambodia's National Representation for the ASEAN Political-Security Council from August 2009 to September 2013, as well as Secretary-General of the ASEAN National Secretariat of Cambodia from 2004 to 2013.

In 2013, he was promoted to the position of Minister Delegate Attached to the Prime Minister of the Kingdom of Cambodia, in charge of Foreign Affairs and ASEAN. From October 2016 to May 2017, he served as the vice chairman of Cambodia's Inter-Ministerial Committee for the World Economic Forum on ASEAN 2017. He currently serves as a Senior Fellow at the Jeffrey Cheah Institute on Southeast Asia and is also a Member of the Global Council of The Asia Society. In 2018, he was appointed to serve on the Board of the Cambodian Higher Education Association (CHEA) as both the Deputy Chairman of the Board of Directors and the Chairman of the Dissemination Affairs Committee. In September 2018, he was reappointed for a second term as Minister Delegate Attached to the Prime Minister of the Kingdom of Cambodia in charge of Foreign Affairs and ASEAN, from 2018-2023.

In August 2022, Kao was appointed as the next Secretary-General of ASEAN at the plenary session of the 55th ASEAN Foreign Ministers' Meeting, and it is the first time a Cambodian will have held the post. In November 2022 at the ASEAN Summit in Phnom Penh, all ASEAN leaders supported his appointment.

== ASEAN Secretary-General ==
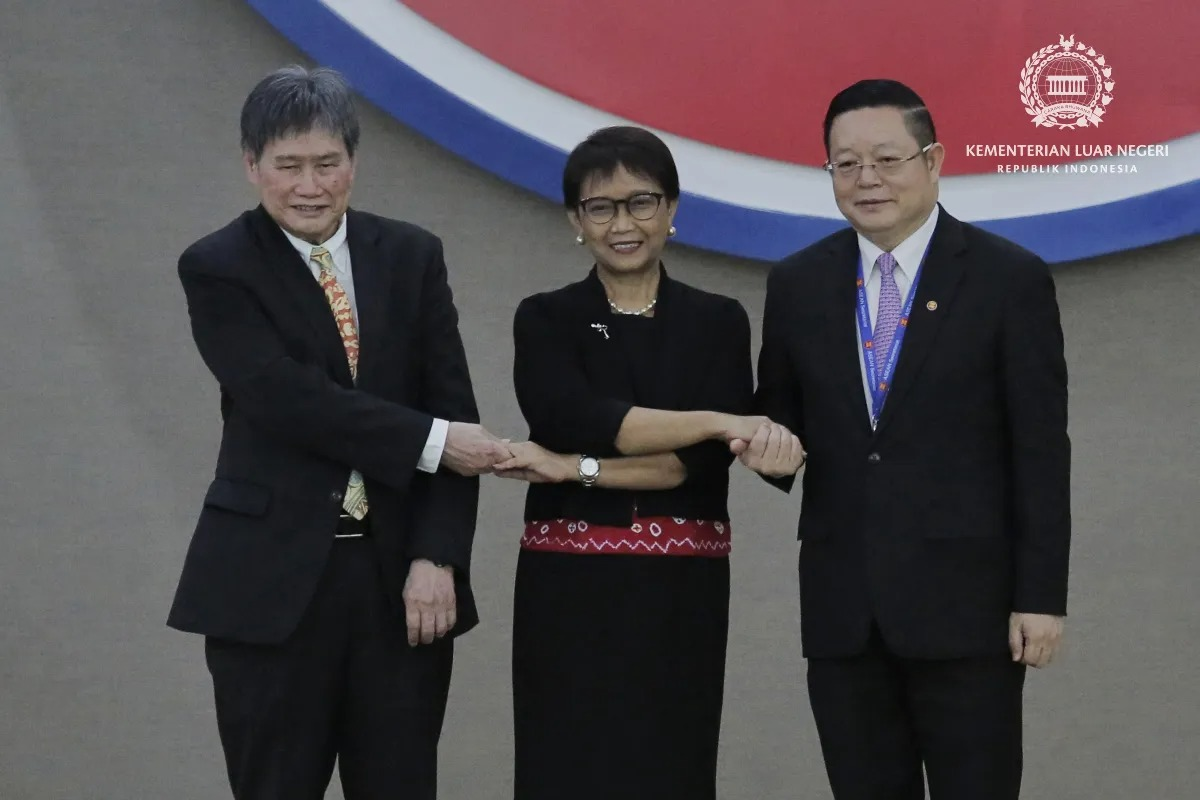
Handover ceremony of ASEAN's Secretary General from Lim Jock Hoi, attended by Retno Marsudi. 9 January 2023

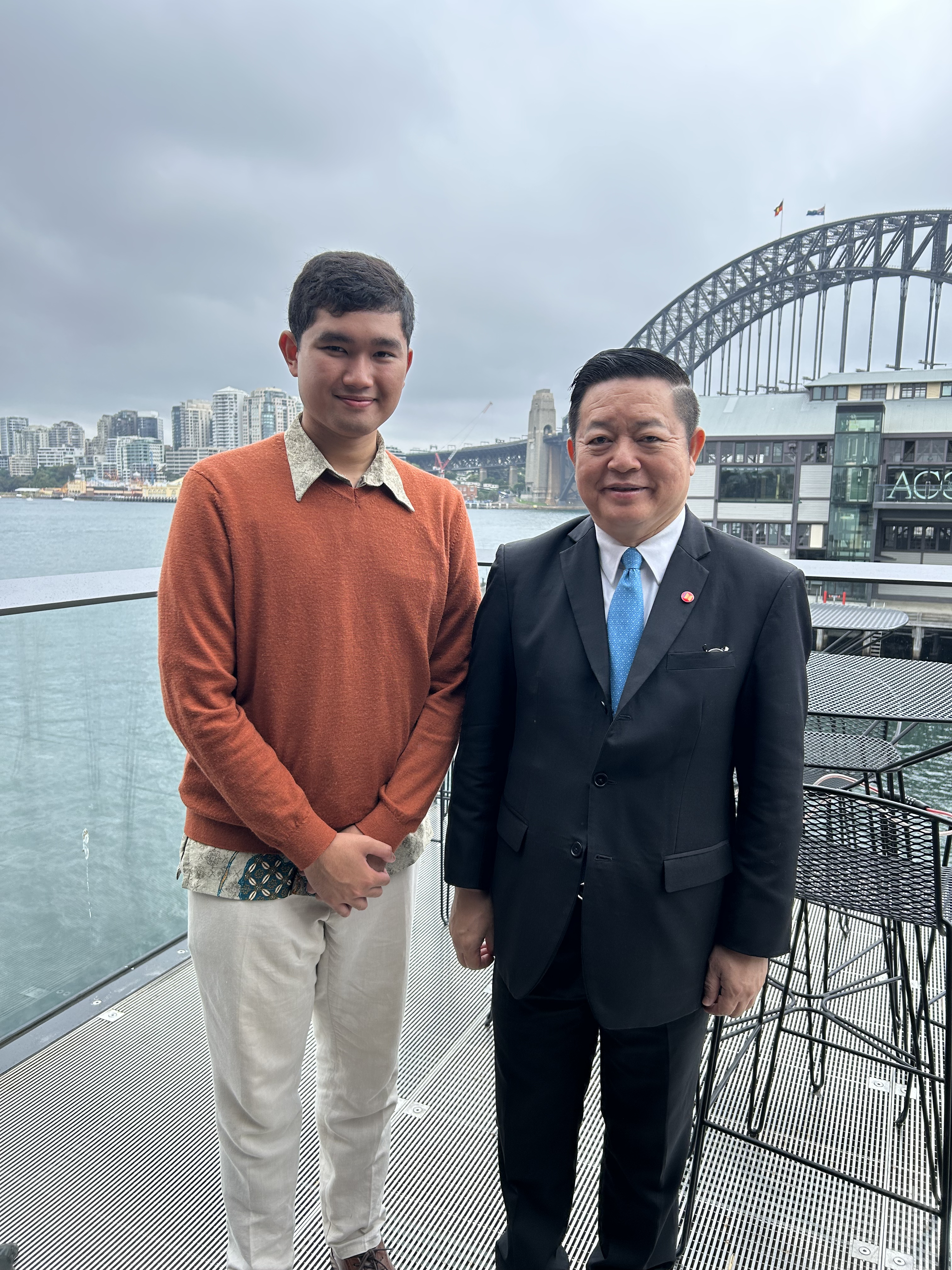
Kao Kim Hourn in Sydney, 2024

On 9 January 2023, Dr. Kao Kim Hourn officially assumed the position of ASEAN Secretary-General, during a ceremony presided over by Indonesia's Foreign Minister Retno Marsudi.

== Personal life ==
Kao was born in 1966 in Koh Sotin District in Kampong Cham province in Cambodia. His father was a school teacher throughout his life, except during the Khmer Rouge period when education was outlawed and teachers were targeted and killed. Due to the incredibly violent conditions in the nation, he and his family spent time living in refugee camps on the Cambodian-Thai border after the Khmer Rouge were removed from power in 1979, and they eventually relocated to the United States as refugees.

== Publications ==
- Perspectives of A Cambodia Development for Peace in the Context of Southeast Asian Integration (1995) [Khmer and English]
- Cambodia in ASEAN (1995) [English]
- Peace from the Heart (1996) with Samraing Kamsan [Khmer]
- Peace and Cooperation: Alternative Paradigms (1997) with Din Merican [English]
- ASEAN Free Trade Agreement: Implications and Future Directions (1997) with Sarah Kanter [English]
- Women's Political Voice in ASEAN: Sharing a Vision (1997) with Norbert von Hofmann [English]
- Cambodian Approach to Conflict Resolution (1998) with Samraing Kamsan [Khmer]
- Skepticism, Outrage, Hope: Reactions to the Death of Pol Pot (1998) with Tania Theriault [English]
- ASEAN A to Z: A Lexicon of ASEAN-Related Terminology (1998)
- Cambodia's Future in ASEAN: Dynamo or Dynamite? (1998) with Jeffrey A. Kaplan [English]
- National Elections: Cambodia's Experiences and Expectations (1998) with Norbert von Hofmann [English]
- Cambodia and the International Community: The Quest for Peace, Development, and Democracy (1998)
- Principles Under Pressure: Cambodia and ASEAN's Non-Interference Policy (1999) with Jeffrey A. Kaplan [English]
- Shared Leadership and Trust Building in Cambodia: Learning from the Past, Sharing Experiences, Views and Visions, and Drawing Lesson for the Future (1999) with Samraing Kamsan [Khmer and English]
- Grassroots Democracy in Cambodia: Opportunities, Challenges and Prospects (1999) with Samraing Kamsan [Khmer and English]
- ASEAN 10 is Born: Commemorating Cambodia's Entry into ASEAN (1999) [English]
- Banking on Knowledge: The Genesis of the Global Development Network, "The challenges of intervention for Cambodian think tanks" (2000) [English]
- The Greater Mekong Sub region and ASEAN from Backwaters to Headwaters (2000) with Jeffrey A. Kaplan [English]
- Cambodia in the New Millennium: Managing the Past and Building the Future (2000) with Samraing Kamsan [Khmer]
- Emerging Civil Society in Cambodia: Promotion of Human Rights and Advancement of Democracy (2001) with Samraing Kamsan and Luy Chanphal [Khmer]
- ASEAN A to Z: A Lexicon of ASEAN-Related Terminology, 2nd Edition (2001)
- Building Civil Society for Good Governance in Cambodia: Achievements, Challenges and Prospects (2001) with Samraing Kamsan [Khmer]
- The Role and Function of Cambodian Parliament: Achievements, Challenges and Prospects (2001) with Van Buntheth and Luy Chanphal [Khmer]
- Cambodia's Foreign Policy and ASEAN: from non-alignment to engagement (2002) [English]
- Whispering in the Ears of Power: The Role of ASEAN Track-Two Diplomacy (2002) [English]
- Communal Council Elections and Grassroots Democracy in Cambodia (2002) with Samraing Kamsan and Inn Tong Ann [Khmer]
- Civil-Military Relations in Cambodia: Issues, Challenges and Prospects (2002) [Khmer and English]
- Strengthening Civil Society-Government Partnership for Good Governance and Development in the Public Sector in Cambodia: Achievements, Challenges and Future Directions (2002) with Samraing Kamsan [Khmer]
- Elections in Cambodia: Lessons Learned and Future Directions (2002) [Khmer and English]
- Sustainable Development, Poverty Reduction and Good Governance in Cambodia (2002) with Chap Soptharith [Khmer]
- Military Reform in Cambodia: Demobilization and Reintegration (2002) with Inn Tong Ann [Khmer]
- Strengthening Civil Society-Parliament Partnership for Good Governance in Cambodia: Achievements, Challenges and Prospects (2003) with Samraing Kamsan [Khmer]
- Legislative Review and Development in Cambodia in the Last Ten Years: Achievements, Challenges and Prospects (2004) with Samraing Kamsan [Khmer and English]
- The Making of the ASEAN Charter, "A Personal Reflection" (2009) by Tommy Koh (2009) [English]

== Awards and honors ==
- Honorary Doctorate, MGIMO, Russia (2026)
- “Specially Invited Professor” by Hiroshima University, Japan (2024)
- Honourable Member of the International Advisory Board of the Institute of ASEAN Studies at the University of Oxford, United Kingdom (2023)
- Guest Professor by Zhengzhou University, China (2023)
- Honorary Doctoral Degree in Political Science from Busan University of Foreign Studies, South Korea (2023)
- Honorary Doctoral Degree in Literature, Kalinga Institute of Industrial Technology, India (2014)
- Honorary Doctoral Degree of Public Service, Ohio University, U.S.A. (2007)

=== National ===
- Grand Order of National Merit (2015), Cambodia
- Royal Order of Cambodia, Grand Cross (2013)
- Royal Order of Sowathara, Grand Officer (2007), Cambodia
- Royal Order of Cambodia, Grand Officer (2007)
- Royal Order of Monisaraphon, Commander (2006), Cambodia
- Royal Order of Monisaraphon, Chevalier (2003), Cambodia
- Royal Order of Monisaraphon, Officer (2003), Cambodia
