= Centre for the Study of Terrorism and Political Violence =

The Centre for the Study of Terrorism and Political Violence (CSTPV), also known as the Handa Centre for the Study of Terrorism and Political Violence, is a research centre at the School of International Relations at the University of St. Andrews, and is Europe's oldest terrorism research facility. The CSTPV is "dedicated to the study of the causes, dynamics, characteristics and consequences of terrorism and related forms of political violence", while committed to rigorous, independent evidence-based scholarly analysis. In addition, the CSTPV investigates the responses of states, civil society, and international organizations to violent modes of waging conflict. As the basis of its work, the CSTPV maintains databases, manifestations, and consequences of terrorism and other forms of political violence.

CSTPV has been able to expand its research and teaching work as the result of a donation from the Worldwide Support for Development (WSD), chaired by Japanese religious leader Haruhisa Handa. Hence it was also named as Handa Centre for the Study of Terrorism and Political Violence.

The Centre teaches a variety of courses and supports research students completing PhDs, DProfs, and MPhils. It also hosts events year round including the annual Paul Wilkinson Memorial Lecture and is home to the Extremism Journal, Contemporary Voices in International Relations and an academic blog.

== History ==
The Centre was founded in 1994 by Paul Wilkinson and Bruce Hoffman and created the Rand-St. Andrews terrorism incident database which provides data for their studies.

In 1985 whilst head of Politics and International Relations at Aberdeen University, Wilkinson had established The Terrorism Research Unit in the department, which developed a terrorism database in coordination with RAND. At that time RAND's terrorism database was overseen by Brian Jenkins who in 1989 was replaced by Bruce Hoffman. Hoffman left RAND to set up CSTPV some time in 1994.

In 1998 Bruce Hoffman returned to RAND and Paul Wilkinson took over as Director, amalgamating the role with his position as Chairman. When Wilkinson stepped down Magnus Ranstorp was appointed Acting Director and then briefly Director from early to mid 2005.

In May 2006 Alex Schmid took over as Director. That autumn CSTPV moved into new premises, occupying now the whole second floor of the West-wing of the New Arts Building.

Schmid remained director until 2009.

After this Richard English was appointed as director and served until 2016. During this time he was also made Bishop Wardlaw Professor in Politics. His inaugural lecture was used as a basis for his 2016 book, Does Terrorism Work?.

In 2016 Tim Wilson became director of the Centre.

The current Director is Dr Sarah Marsden.

== Academic programmes ==
CSTPV offer a full-time Postgraduate Diploma/M.Litt in Terrorism Studies along with two long distance E-learning courses. CSTPV currently runs two E-Learning courses, an online Certificate in Terrorism course, with their commercial partners Informa, and a part-time E-Learning PG Dip/M.Litt in Terrorism Studies. The development of these courses is overseen by the Terrorism Studies Programme Board.

== Publications ==
Contemporary Voices
- Discipline: Political science
- Language: English

Publication details
- Former name: Journal of Terrorism Research
- History: 2010–present
- Open access: Yes
- License: CC-BY 4.0

Standard abbreviations
- ISO 4: Contemp. Voices

Indexing
- ISSN: 2516-3159

Links
- Journal homepage

Contemporary Voices: St Andrews Journal of International Relations, formerly Journal of Terrorism Research, is a quarterly online journal covering the study of terrorism. It was established in 2010. It rebranded as Contemporary Voices: St Andrews Journal of International Relations in 2018, beginning with volume 1, issue 1, under that name, after eight volumes of quarterly issues under its former name.
