= Worldwide Support for Development =

- 世界開発協力機構
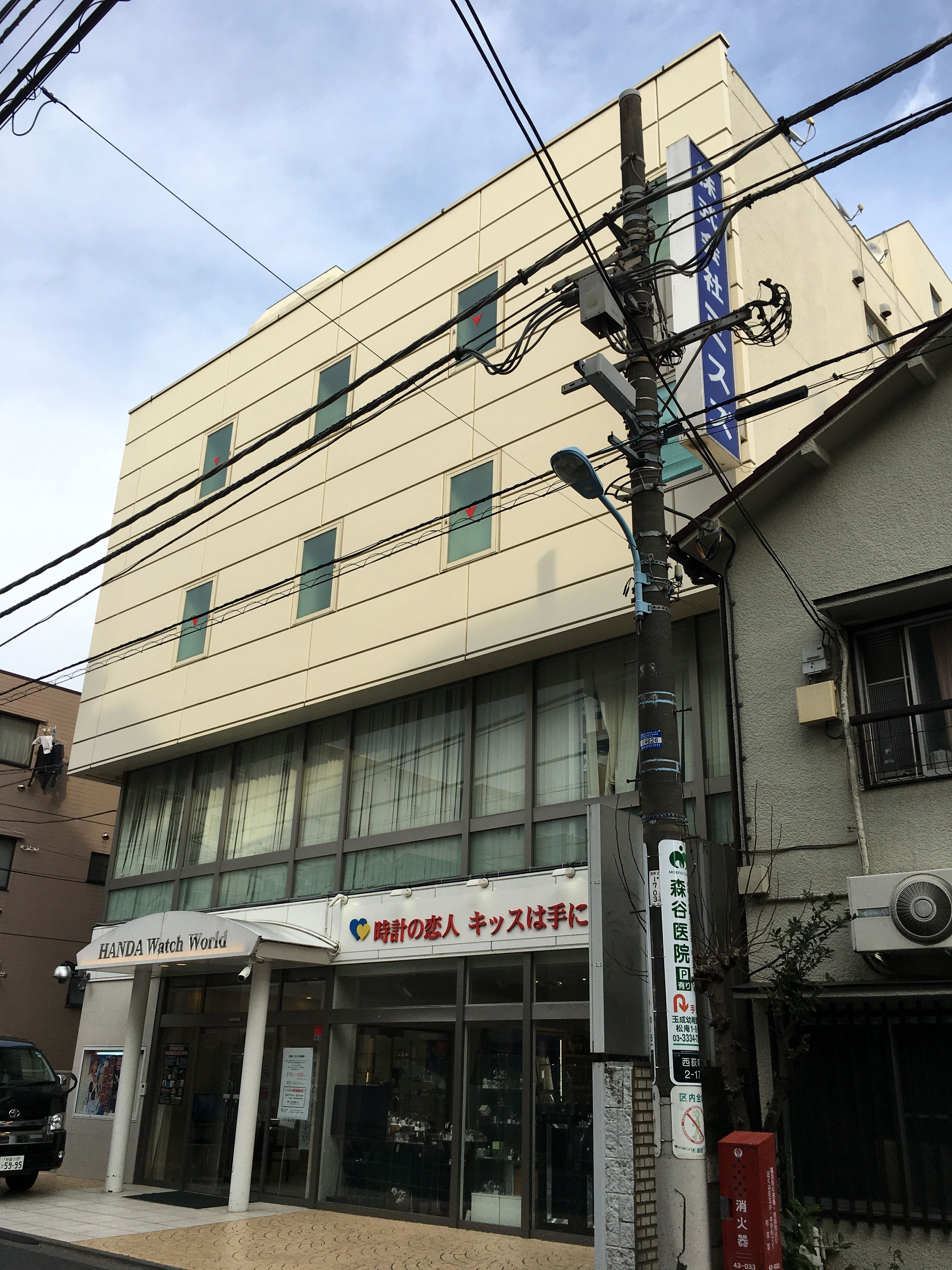
- Misuzu Building
- Abbreviation: WSD
- Formation: 2008
- Type: Nonprofit organization
- Purpose: International Cooperation, Social Welfare activities, Support for Universities and Academic Organizations
- Location: Tokyo, Japan
- Official language: Japanese
- Key people: Haruhisa Handa
- Website: www.wsd.or.jp

Worldwide Support for Development (Japanese: 世界開発協力機構, Hepburn: Sekai Kaihatsu Kyōryoku Kikō; WSD) is a not for profit organization in Japan.

== History ==
Worldwide Support for Development was registered as a specified non-profit juridical person (NPO) by The Metropolitan Tokyo in 2008. It is aimed to assist disadvantaged people and to support international cooperation, social welfare, universities and academic institutions. WSD has hitherto organized three World Opinion Leaders Summits as international conference, inviting Tony Blair, Bill Clinton, and Colin Powell. It has also co-organized World Sports Summit for Peace in Tokyo together with the International Sports Promotion Society, a general incorporated association, and also has held charity concerts.

== Organization ==
- Chairman: Haruhisa Handa
- Vice Chairman: Kenichi Ito, Tim Lankester
- President of the Board of Directors: Yasumichi Inoue
- Directors: His Royal Highness Samdech Norodom Sirivudh, Kao Kim Hourn, Shuhei Koyama and Junnosuke Watanabe.

== Main Event ==
- Global Opinion Leaders Summit

It has organized an international conference to discuss on contribution to world peace and other themes.

- World Sports Summit for Peace

WSD has been supporting a series of World Sports Summit for Peace since 2012. It co-sponsored the 2013 Summit held in Tokyo with International Sports Promotion Society.

== Main Supporting Activities ==
=== International Social Welfare ===
- Support for Cambodian Red Cross
- Support for hurricane and flood victims in Laos in 2009
- Building a nursing school and maternity hospital as a cooperative in support in the human development and medical fields in Laos.
- Support for school education programs in Mengrager a poverty area in Indonesia in 2011
- Support for the first generation of the Asia Business Project, which was an exchange business among Cambodia, Thailand, Vietnam, Myanmar and Laos organized by Nippon Kogyo Shimbun Co., Ltd. And Sankei Shimbun Co., Ltd.
- Co-sponsored together with International Sports Promotion Society “X’mas Charity Pro-Wrestling Dinner Show” organized by Tokyo Art Foundation held on December 9, 2014 at Chinzanso. The proceeds of which were then donated to Santavale and was then presented a certificate of gratitude.

=== International Academic Support ===
- Established and supported WSD Handa Center for Human Rights and International Justice at Stanford University. Michael Bolton serves as an Ambassador of the Center.
- Supported Japan-China relations Study at the Literal Cultural Department at the University of Edinburgh.
- Support for an Asian Gerontology Study Workshop organized by the Institute of Policy Studies.
- Support for a Medical Fellowship at Corpus Christy College at Oxford University.

=== International Conference Support ===
- Support for the Asia Economic Forum which has been held successively since 2005.
- Support for the Symposium on Issues Related to Japan and the Middle East held on August 3, 2009
- Support for hosting the international conference in Cambodia “Bridges” from September 2009 to April 2010.[7]
- Support for organizing the “Japan- Egypt Forum” held on November 29 and 30 2009.

=== Main Cooperating Organizations ===
International Parliament Union (IPU)

In September 2013, WSD executed an agreement with the Inter-Parliamentary Union (IPU) on a project for strengthening democracy in the Asia region. The project is focused on promoting the involvement of women in parliament and in youth so as to strengthen the parliamentary potentiality, based on the fact that there are some nations with no female parliamentary members whatsoever.

Pacific Forum CSIS

WSD supports young leaders to be involved in the management of the Pacific Forum CSIS and to accumulate practical experience by participating in international conferences organized by the Pacific Forum CSIS, through WSD-Handa Fellowship Program.

Handa Terrorism Political Violence Research Center

WSD offers support for the Handa Terrorism Political Violence Research Center associated with University of St Andrews to support international conferences to study terrorism and political violence and scholarship for researchers.

Koffi Annan Foundation

WSD has been promoting the initiative of the Election Process Normalizing Initiative with the Kofi Annan Foundation.

Nelson Mandela Children’s Fund

WSD support for the Nelson Mandela Children's Fund, in order to build a children’s hospital with cutting edge medical facilities in South Africa. On December 11, 2013, WSD organized Toshu Fukami Christmas Charity Dinner Show, and donated all the proceeds to the Fund for the purpose of building the hospital.

Special Consulate of Cambodia in Fukuoka

Since 2009, WSD has been supporting a project for the Special Consulate of Cambodia in Fukuoka to recruit several students to study in Cambodia for short term overseas study.

Japan International Forum

WSD supports the Japan International Forum to broadcast discussion programs aimed at policy proposals and opinion advertisements in national newspapers. In 2009, WSD supported Japan International Forum worrying about the negative influence by the government representative’s comment “we should compromise to accept 3.5 islands-return proposal”. on the dispute with Russia over the Kurile Islands, to advertise in several national newspapers. an opinion against it. WSD also supported Mr. Kenichi Ito, director-general of the Japan International Forum and others to advertise policy proposals in newspapers for the discussion program FACE “Thinking about the Return of Kurile Islands” of BS11. In October, 2009, WSD supported the Japan International Forum to submit a policy proposal to the Prime Minister, advertised an opinion in national newspapers on “Positive Pacifism and the way Japan-US Alliance Ought To Be”.
