= Björn Stenvers =

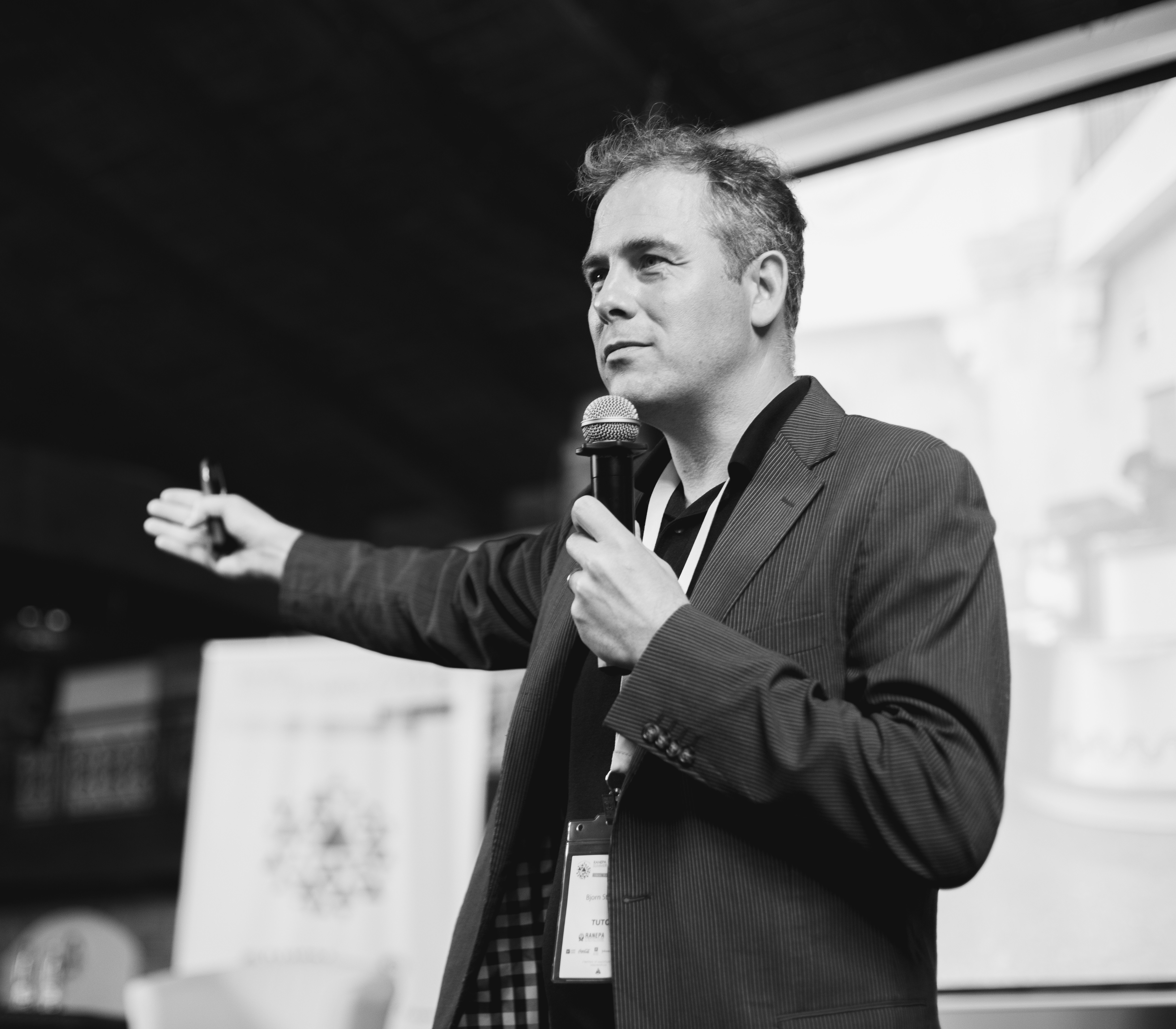
- Stenvers at Ranepa Summer Campus 2016

Björn Stenvers GCC KCM FRGS (born 25 May 1972, in Arnhem) is medievalist and director of Vereniging De Zaansche Molen and SaNS Expertise Center of the University of Amsterdam. Until begin 2026 he was CEO of Eye Care Foundation and before CEO at the Fonds de dotation de l’ICOM (of the International Council of Museums). He was director of the foundation of the Official Museums of Amsterdam (2013-2016) which he also founded. Björn was the only Dutch lecturer at RANEPA (2015-2021).

In 2017 Stenvers founded the Altai Museum Academy, the Moscow Zoo Academy, the Aruba Museum Academy, in 2015 the Amsterdam Museum Academy, and in 2014 Rostov Kremlin Museum Academy, for museum staff trainings.
He holds a number of board positions; chair of the Amsterdammer van het Jaar, the Nepal Federation Netherlands (NFN), and trustee of the World Heritage Site of Brest Fortress. Stenvers was married to singer Tamara Hoekwater. He is the great-grandchild of the Austrian composer Franz R. Friedl. He has several degrees in Art History, Marketing and Management.

== Awards and honours ==
- Officer of the Order of Orange-Nassau (2026)
- Knight Grand Cross of the Royal Order of Monisaraphon (2026)
- Knight Grand Cross of the Royal Order of Cambodia (2023)
- Knight Commander of the Royal Order of Monisaraphon (2022)

== Publications ==
- Mirakel van Amsterdam. De kwaliteit van een verhaal... UvA: Amsterdam, 2024.
- The Art History of Eye Care. Phnom Penh, 2022, ISBN 978-9083-252001
- Siku katika maisha ya Leyla & Ray. ECF: Dar Es Salaam, 2022, ISBN 978-9090-355047
- The little Coloring Book of eyes by Winksy, Amsterdam, 2022, ISBN 978-9083-252070
- A day in the life of Hy & Ry. ECF: HCMC, 2021, ISBN 978-9090-355047
- Museum visitors with Hearing Disabilities, Publishing House Pero, Moscow, 2017, ISBN 978-5-906988-71-3
- Amsterdam Museum Monitor, Amsterdam, 2016, ISBN 978-90-826597-0-2
- Marketing from the Papagajnika: the three "P"'s on museum marketing for cities, Moscow, 2017, ISBN 978-5-7749-1249-0
- Amsterdam Museums: a better return through cooperation, Berlin, 2017
- Museums in cities working together: more collaboration: better returns, Murmansk, 2015
- Kleurboek - Colouring book, Museums of Amsterdam, Bekking & Blitz Publishing, Amersfoort, 2015, ISBN 978-906109-50-71
- Amsterdam Museum Monitor, Amsterdam, 2015
- What is the situation of the Libraries in Europe within 7 years (2021) via seven P's, Amersfoort, 2014
