= Royal Order of Monisaraphon =

Honorary award of Cambodia for achievements in various fields

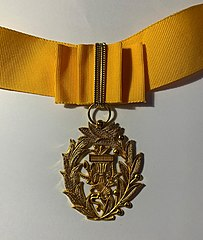

Awarded by Cambodia
- Type: Order of chivalry
- Established: 1 February 1905; 121 years ago
- Eligibility: Special merits for society
- Awarded for: accomplishment and outstanding support in the fields of education, arts, science or social works
- Status: Currently constituted
- Grand Master: King Norodom Sihamoni
- Grades: Grand Cross (GCM); Grand Officer (GOM); Knight Commander (KCM); Officer (OM); Knight (KM)
- Ribbon of the Order

The Royal Order of Monisaraphon (Khmer: គ្រឿងឥស្សរិយយសមុនីសារាភ័ណ្ឌ) was founded by King Sisowath of Cambodia on 1 February 1905. It is conferred for accomplishment and outstanding support in the fields of education, arts, science, literacy, or social works.

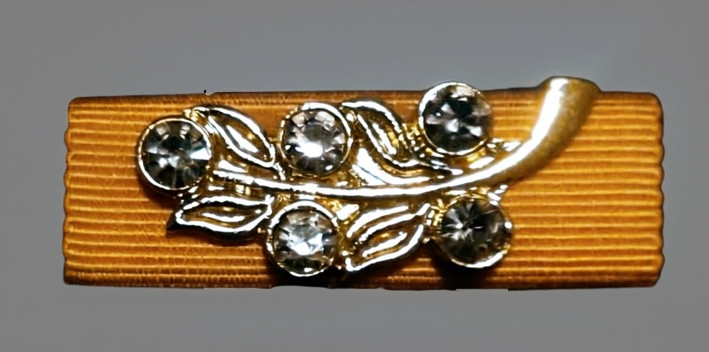
Knight Grand cross GCM (highest rank) ribbon Royal Order of Monisaraphon Knight Grand Cross GCM (highest rank) medal Royal Order of Monisaraphon

== History ==
The Order of Monisaraphon (or Muni Isvarabarna): founded by King Sisowath of Cambodia on 1 February 1905 (first statutes issued 18 April 1905) and awarded in a single class limited to Cambodians, French protected subjects and other Asians. Reformed by King Norodom Sihanouk on 9 September 1948 and extended to three classes. Extended again to five classes in 1961. Awarded for services in the fields of literature and the fine arts, education, justice, administration, and science. After the Khmer Rouge period, the order was reinstituted by King Norodom Sihanouk by Royal Decree No.1095/01 on 5 October 1995.

== Current classes ==
The five classes of appointment to the Order are, in descending order of precedence:

1. Maha Sirivaddha (មហាសិរីវឌ្ឍន៍) or Knight Grand Cross (GCM)
2. Mahasena (មហាសេនា) or Knight Grand Officer (GOM)
3. Dhipadinda (ធិបឌិន្ទ) or Knight Commander (KCM)
4. Sena (សេនា) or Knight Officer (OM)
5. Assarariddhi (អស្សឫទ្ធិ) or Knight or Chevalier (KM)

== Design ==
The golden badge consists of a wreath of palm leaves and (left) and laurel leaves (right) with berries, with enclosed in the center a fan in front of two smaller sprays holding a goblet on which rests the closed book of a scholar. Badge reverse is the inversion of the obverse. The Ribbon colour is golden yellow. Measuring 67mm in length and 54mm in width.

== Post-nominals ==
The senior ranks of Knight Grand Cross entitle their members to use the title as post-nominal GCM; Knight Grand Officer, GOM; Knight Commander, KCM. The lower ranks of Knight Officer use the post-nominal OM; and Knight, KM. Members of all classes of the order are assigned positions in the order of precedence.

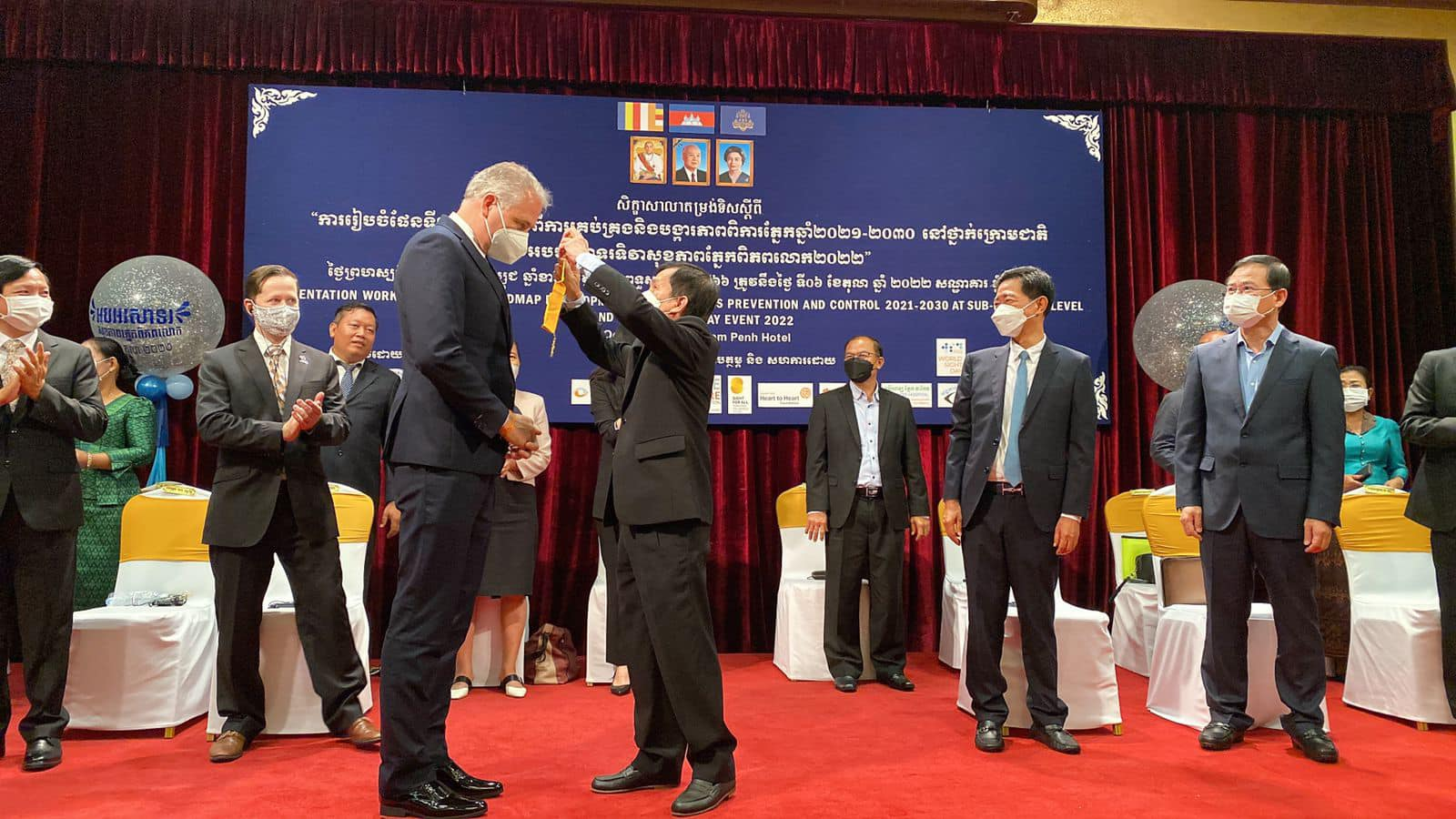
H.E. Sea Huong (State Secretary, Ministry of Health) appoints Dutch Björn Stenvers as Knight Commander on 6 October 2022.

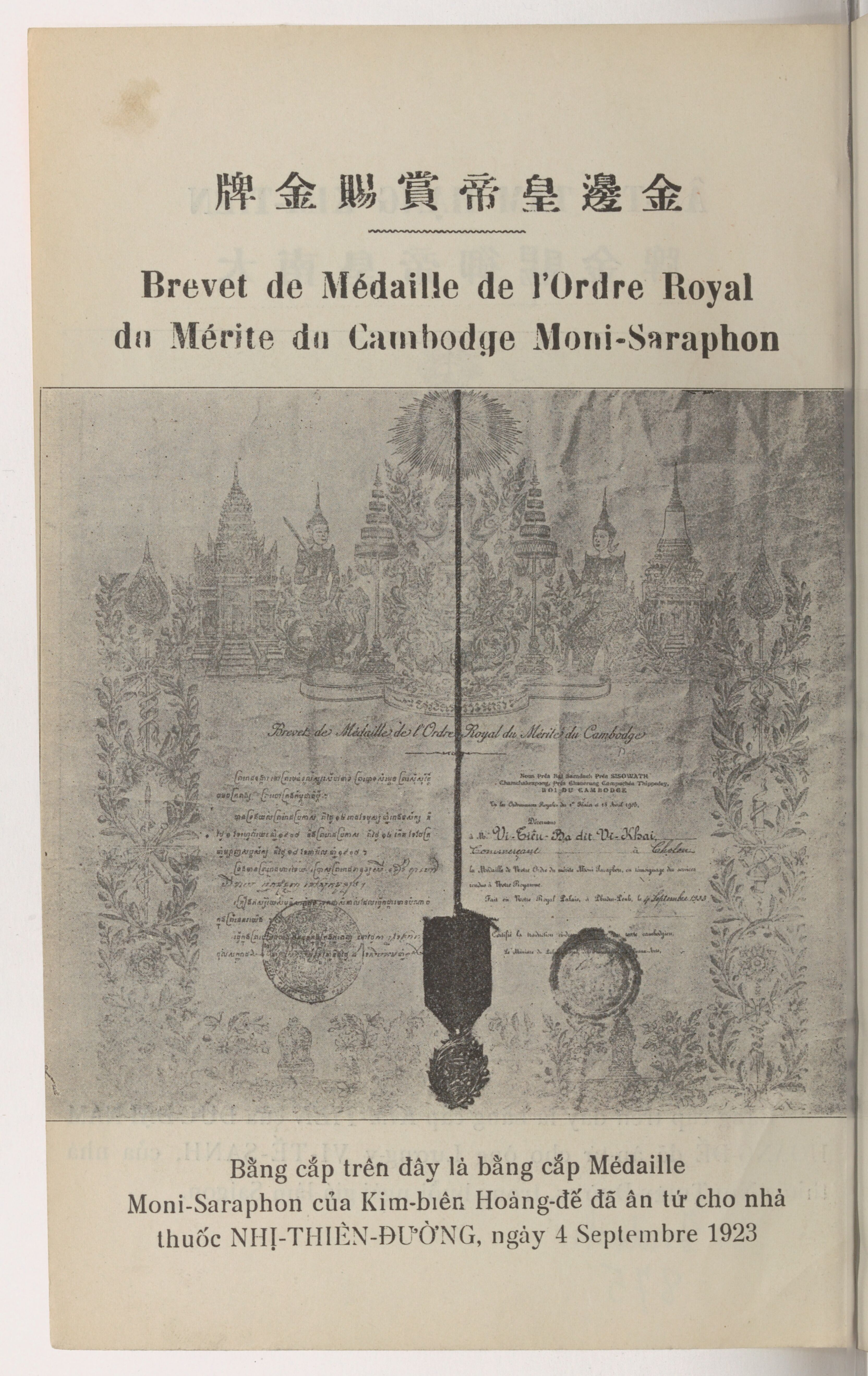
Brevet de Médaille de l'Ordre Royal du Mérite du Cambodge Moni-Saraphon.

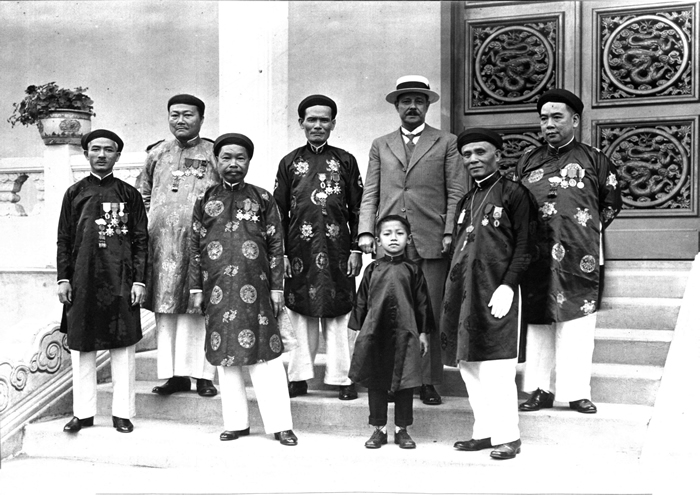
The Decorations of a Group of Mandarins with among which: Cambodian Royal Order of Moniseraphon.

== Recipients ==
Year appointed	Class	Name	Post-nominals
1929	Chevalier	Mr. Gustave Louis Alexandre FAVIER	KM
unknown	Commander	Mr. Fortunato Abat	CM
unknown	Grand Officer	Mr. Hor Namhong	GOM
unknown	Commander	Mr. Gunapala Piyasena Malalasekera	CM
unknown	Knight Commander	Norodom Arunrasmy	KCM
unknown	Knight Commander	Norodom Yuvaneath	KCM
unknown	Grand Cross	Norodom Sihamoni	GCM
unknown	Grand Cross & Commander	Mr. Haruhisa Handa	GCM CM
2003	Commander	Mr. Yōhei Sasakawa	CM
2003	Grand Officer & Knight	Dr. Kao Kim Hourn	OM KM
2006	Commander	Dr. Kao Kim Hourn	CM
2007	unknown	Mr. Horst Posdorf	unknown
2007	Grand Officer	Mr. Siddhartha Kaul	GOM
2008	Grand Cross	Dr. Rikhi Thakral	GCM
2009	Grand Officer	Mr. Okhna Mengly J. Quach	GOM
2011	Officer	Ms. Zahng Gil-jah	OM
2012	Commander	Dr. Sriram Bhagut Mathe	CM
2014	Knight Commander	Mr. Allen Dodgson Tan	KCM
2014	Commander	Mr. Len Leon Austin	CM
2015	Grand Cross	Mr. George Reiff	GCM
2015	Grand Officer	Mr. Mahmood Abdul Kader Alshahwarzi for Al-Serkal Mosque Phnom Penh	GOM
2015	Grand Officer	Dr. Stéphane Xavier Racine	GOM
2015	Commander	Mr. Mustafa Shoeb Zalotrawala for Al-Serkal Mosque Phnom Penh	KCM
2015	Commander	Mr. Mohamed Muktar Ahmed for Al-Serkal Mosque Phnom Penh	KCM
2015	Grand Cross	Mr. Miki Watanabe	GCM
2017	Grand Cross	Mr. Khun-Neay Khuon	GCM
2017	Grand Cross	Ms. Anne Lemaistre	GCM
2017	Grand Officer	Mr. Patrick Paul Seger	GOM
2017	Grand Cross	Mr. Magnus Saemundsson	GCM
2017	Grand Cross	Mr. Allen Dodgson Tan	GCM
2018	Commander	Dr. Fraser Cameron	CM
2018	Commander	Mr. Robert Cripps	CM
2018	Commander	Mr. Thomas Cripps	CM
2018	Commander	Rev. Franklin Graham	CM
2018	Commander	Mr. James Kenneth Isaacs	CM
2018	Commander	Mr. Patrick Paul Seger	CM
2018	Commander	Mr. Bob Jacob	CM
2018	Commander	Ms. Amy Tennent	CM
2019	Grand Cross	Mr. Charles Wilson Matthews	GCM
2019	Grand Cross	Mr. Patrick Paul Seger	GCM
2020	Grand Cross	Mr. Rho Hyunjun, KOICA	GCM
2020	Grand Officer	Mr. Kang Hwang Wook, KOICA	GOM
2021	Grand Officer	Mr. Robert Elliott	GOM
2022	Grand Officer	Mr. Edouard George, President, Phoenix Voyages Group Ltd	GOM
2022	Knight Commander	Dr. James Muecke, Sight for All	KCM
2022	Knight Commander	Mr. Bjorn Stenvers	KCM
2022	Knight Commander	Ms. Kate Moynihan, CEO, Seva Foundation	KCM
2022	Knight Commander	Ms. Hu-Jeong Moon, Director, Heart to Heart Foundation	KCM
2022	Knight Commander	Mr. Ek Sarou, Director, Battambong Ophthalmic Center	CM
2022	Knight Commander	H.E. Leung Chun-Ying, President, GX Foundation	KCM
2022	Knight Commander	Mr. Sambath Pol, Eye Care Foundation	KCM
2022	Knight Commander	Mr. Tokyo Bak, FHF	KCM
2022	Chevalier	Mr. Horm Piseth,	KM
2022	Chevalier	Mr. Prof. Mar Amrin	KM
2022	Chevalier	Ms. Somuny Ouk	KM
2022	Chevalier	Major Ian Brookes	KM
2022	Knight Officer	Ms. Judy Hatwell, CEO, Sight for All	OM
2023	Grand Cross	Gen. Chavalit Yongchaiyudh	GCM
2023	Knight Commander	Ms. Jane Madden	KCM
2023	Knight Commander	Ms. Gabi Hollows	KCM
2023	Knight Commander	Mr. Ian Wishart	KCM
2023	Knight Commander	Mr. Jon Crail, FHF	KCM
2024	Chevalier	Mr. Liu Zhen	KCM
2025	Grand Cross	Mr. Trevor Gile, Liger Charitable Foundation	GCM
2025	Grand Cross	Ms. Agnieszka Tynkiewicz-Gile, Liger Charitable Foundation	GCM
2025	Grand Officer	Mr. Dominic Sharpe, Liger Leadership Academy	GOM
2025	Grand Officer	Major Ian Brookes (retired)	GOM
2025	Grand Cross	Mr. Jacopo Rossi	GCM
2025	Grand Cross	Mr. Rodney Neil Cameron	GCM
2025	Grand Cross	Ms. Wendy Lee Cameron	GCM
2025	Grand Cross	Mr. Paolo Dionisi	GCM
2026	Grand Cross	Mr. Bjorn Stenvers	GCM

== See also ==
- Cambodian honours system
- Royal Order of Sahametrei
