= Bruce Hoffman =

American counterterrorism analyst and foreign policy expert

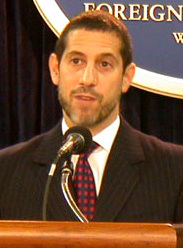
- Hoffman in 2006
- Born: 1954 (age 71–72); New York City, U.S.
- Title: Shelby Cullom and Kathryn W. Davis Senior Fellow; George H. Gilmore Senior Fellow

Academic background
- Education: Connecticut College (BA); New College, Oxford (BPhil); St. Antony's College, Oxford (DPhil)
- Thesis: Jewish Terrorist Activities and the British Government in Palestine, 1939–1947 (1985)
- Doctoral advisor: Michael Howard
- Other advisor: Bernard Wasserstein

Academic work
- Discipline: International relations
- Institutions: RAND Corporation; University of St Andrews; Georgetown University; Claremont McKenna College
- Main interests: International relations theory

Bruce R. Hoffman (born 1954) is an American political analyst. He specializes in the study of terrorism, counter-terrorism, insurgency, and counter-insurgency. Hoffman is the senior fellow for counterterrorism and homeland security for the Council on Foreign Relations, a foreign policy think tank. He is also a professor at the School of Foreign Service of Georgetown University. He was the George H. Gilmore Senior Fellow at the U.S. Military Academy's Combating Terrorism Center from 2003 to 2024.

Hoffman's interest in the study of international relations began while he was an undergraduate at Connecticut College. He received his graduate education at the Oxford University, earning his doctorate in 1986. Hoffman has since held multiple professorships and appointments. In May 2022, Virginia governor Glenn Youngkin appointed Hoffman as a commissioner on the state's Commission to Combat Antisemitism.

== Education ==
Hoffman matriculated at Connecticut College, receiving a Bachelor of Arts with honors in government and history in 1976. While a freshman at Connecticut College in 1972, he became interested in the study of terrorism after watching the Munich Massacre unfold during the 1972 Olympic Games.

Upon graduating, Hoffman studied international relations at New College, Oxford, where he obtained a postgraduate Bachelor of Philosophy (BPhil) degree. In 1986, he completed his Doctor of Philosophy (DPhil) degree in international relations at St Antony's College, Oxford. His dissertation was entitled "Jewish Terrorist Activities and the British Government in Palestine, 1939–1947" and was supervised by Michael Howard with assistance from Bernard Wasserstein.

== Career ==
In 1981, Hoffman joined the RAND Corporation in Santa Monica, California. He left RAND in 1994 when he was appointed senior lecturer (and, subsequently, reader) in international relations at the University of St Andrews. In 1994, he co-founded (with Professor Paul Wilkinson) and was the first director of the Centre for the Study of Terrorism and Political Violence (CSTPV) at St Andrews, where he was also chairman of the Department of International Relations (1994–1998).

Hoffman left St Andrews at the end of 1998 to return to RAND as director of RAND's Washington Office (1998–2006), vice president for external affairs at RAND (2001–2004), and acting director of the Center for Middle East Public Policy (2004). He also held the RAND Corporate Chair in Counterterrorism and Counterinsurgency (2006–2006). Hoffman served as a commissioner on the FBI's 9/11 Review Commission, and one of the lead authors of the commission's unclassified final report, which was released on March 25, 2015.

He was scholar-in-residence for counterterrorism at the Central Intelligence Agency between 2004 and 2006; an adviser on counterterrorism to the Office of National Security Affairs, Coalition Provisional Authority, Baghdad, Iraq in 2004, and an adviser on counterinsurgency to the Strategy, Plans, and Analysis Office at Multi-National Forces-Iraq Headquarters, Baghdad in 2005. Hoffman was also an adviser to the Congressional Iraq Study Group in 2006.

Hoffman was a visiting fellow at All Souls College, Oxford, in 2009. Hoffman has been a public policy fellow and a distinguished scholar at the Woodrow Wilson International Center for Scholars in Washington, D.C., and is currently a Global Wilson Fellow. He was also a visiting professor at S. Rajaratnam School of International Studies, where he was the S. Rajaratnam Professor of Strategic Studies for 2009 and the William F. Podlich Distinguished Fellow and visiting professor of government at Claremont McKenna College in 2016. Since 2006, Hoffman has taught at the International Institute for Counter-Terrorism at Reichman University in Herzliya, Israel. He was the director of the Center for Security Studies and the Security Studies MA degree program at Georgetown University's Walsh School of Foreign Service from 2010-2017, having begun teaching there as an adjunct in 2004 and as a full professor with tenure in 2006. Hoffman also currently teaches at Georgetown's Center for Jewish Civilization and was its director from 2020-2023.

== Publications ==
Hoffman's publications include "Holy Terror": The Implications of Terrorism Motivated by a Religious Imperative (1993). The renowned British historian of intelligence, Professor Christopher Andrew, writes in his book, Secret World: A History of Intelligence, that "Bruce Hoffman, the academic terrorism expert who most clearly identified the future threat from Holy Terror, did so largely because he took a much longer-term view than most intelligence agencies."

Hoffman's own books include: Inside Terrorism (1998); The Failure of Britain's Military Strategy in Palestine, 1939–1947 (1983); and, Anonymous Soldiers: The Struggle For Israel, 1917–1947 (2015).

Anonymous Soldiers was awarded the Washington Institute for Near East Studies' Gold Medal for the best book on Middle Eastern politics, history and society published in 2015 and was also named the Jewish Book of the Year for 2015 by the Jewish Book Council. It was cited by both the Kirkus Review and the St. Louis Times-Despatch as one of the "Best Books of the Year, 2015" and was a New York Times Book Review "Editors' Choice." Columbia University Press recognized Inside Terrorism as one of the 25 notable books published by the press in its 125-year-long history. In 2024, with Jacob Ware, Hoffman co-authored God, Guns, and Sedition: Far Right Terrorism in America, which was awarded that year's Airey Neave Book Prize, "The award is to honour the work of non-fiction which the judging panel considers to have made the most significant, original, relevant, and practically valuable contribution to the understanding of terrorism."

Hoffman is the editor-in-chief of the scholarly journal Studies in Conflict and Terrorism, and the series editor of Columbia Studies in Terrorism and Irregular Warfare, published by Columbia University Press. With Fernando Reinares, he co-edited The Evolution of the Global Terrorist Threat: From 9/11 to Osama bin Laden's Death (2014).

Between 2001 and 2006, Hoffman was a regular contributor to The Atlantic. He is a contributing editor for The National Interest.

Hoffman was cited by Washingtonian magazine in its March 2021 cover story as among the "250 Most Influential People" "who'll be playing the biggest roles in federal Washington's policy debates of the next few year"" in the "National Security And Defense" category.

== Awards ==
In November 1994, the CIA awarded Hoffman the Agency Seal Medallion—the highest level of commendation given to a non-government employee which recognizes work that distinctly benefits the interests and national security of the United States.

Hoffman was a World Economic Forum Fellow (2003-2005); an honorary degree recipient and inductee into the Garfield Society from Hiram College in 2006; and was a fellow and C. V. Starr Distinguished Visitor at the American Academy of Berlin that same year. In 2016, Hoffman was awarded the Harriet Buescher Lawrence '34 Prize for Leadership or Inspiring Others for Good Through Direct Service by the Connecticut College Alumni Association. In May 2021, Georgetown University's School of Foreign Service Academic Council gave Hoffman the SFS Faculty of the Year Award.
