= Paul Wilkinson (political scientist) =

British academic (1937–2011)

- Born: 9 May 1937; Harrow, London, England
- Died: 11 August 2011 (aged 74)

Academic background
- Education: Swansea University (BA, MA)

Academic work
- Discipline: International relations Political science
- Sub-discipline: Terrorism; Political violence
- Institutions: Cardiff University; University of Aberdeen; University of St Andrews

Paul Wilkinson CBE (9 May 1937 – 11 August 2011) was a British terrorism expert and an Emeritus Professor of International Relations and director of the University of St Andrews Centre for the Study of Terrorism and Political Violence (CSTPV). Dubbed "Britain's leading academic specialist in the study of terrorism", he was a frequent commentator in mainstream British media and an advisor to the UK government.

== Early life and education ==
Born in Harrow, Middlesex, on 9 May 1937, Wilkinson was educated at John Lyon School in Harrow. He earned a Bachelor of Arts degree in modern history and politics at Swansea University, followed by a Master of Arts.

== Career ==
After serving six years as an education officer in the Royal Air Force, he began his academic career at the Cardiff University, as an assistant lecturer in politics in 1966. He became senior lecturer and then reader in politics at Cardiff before moving to the University of Aberdeen, where he was appointed as the first chair in international relations in 1979. He published his first book on terrorism, Political Terrorism, in 1974.

In 1989 he was appointed to the first chair in international relations at the University of St Andrews and served as the director of the Research Institute for the Study of Conflict and Terrorism from 1989 to 1994. In 1994 he co-founded Centre for the Study of Terrorism and Political Violence (CSTPV) with its first director, Bruce Hoffman.

During the 1997–98 academic year he was a visiting fellow at Trinity College, Cambridge. He is co-founder and was co-editor of the academic journal Terrorism and Political Violence 1989–2006, and directed a research project funded by the UK's Economic and Social Research Council (ESRC) on the UK's preparedness for terrorist attacks. He also served as Adviser to Lord Lloyd of Berwick's "Inquiry into Legislation Against Terrorism" and authored its second volume, "Research Report for the Inquiry", which were published in October 1996. In August 2007 he was appointed Emeritus Professor of International Relations and retired from serving as the chairman of CSTPV's advisory board but remained active in academia and policy circles.

== Academic work ==
Throughout his career, which spanned five decades that saw the rise of the Irish Republican Army's bombings to the September 11, 2001 attacks, Wilkinson was a strong opponent of terrorism but adamant that democratic responses to it always be guided by the rule of law. For example, he publicly opposed attempts to increase the period permitted to detain terrorism suspects without trial in the UK and condemned the George W. Bush administration's approach to counterterrorism, such as the Guantánamo detention camp, which he criticized as flouting "international law and criminal justice".

Indeed, he said that liberal democracy was what sparked his interest in his subject, stating that he had become "interested initially in the mid-1960s in why terrorism had been effective in some conflicts and not others. Then, with the burgeoning of modern international terrorism in the 1970s, I became interested in the politics of democratic and international response". He appreciated it as a multi-disciplinary and "ever-changing" research topic that was especially rewarding because he was a part of "a small band of pioneers in this almost totally neglected field" in his early career.

== Personal life ==
He was appointed Commander of the Order of the British Empire (CBE) in the 2009 New Year Honours and died on 11 August 2011 at age 74.

== Select bibliography ==
=== Single-authored works ===
- Political Terrorism (1974)
- Terrorism Versus Democracy (1976)
- Terrorism and the Liberal State (1977)
- Terrorism: International Dimensions (1979)
- The New Fascists (1981)
- The New Fascists (second edition) (1983)
- Terrorism and the Liberal State (second edition) (1986)
- Lessons of Lockerbie (1989)
- Terrorist Targets and Tactics (1990)
- The Victims of Terrorism: Research Report of the Airey Neave Trust (1994)
- Combating International Terrorism (1995)
- Inquiry into Legislation Against Terrorism, volume two, research report (1996)
- Terrorism Versus Democracy: The Liberal State Response (2000)
- Terrorism Versus Democracy: The Liberal State Response, second edition revised and updated (2006)
- International Relations: A Very Short Introduction (2007)

=== Jointly authored works ===
- Terrorism: Theory and Practice (1978)
- British Perspective on Terrorism (1981)
- Contemporary Research on Terrorism (1986)
- Terrorism and International Order (1986)
- Technology and Terrorism (1993)
- Terrorism: British Perspectives (1993)
- Aviation Terrorism and Security (1999)
- Addressing the New Terrorism (2003)
- Terrorism and Human Rights (2006)
- Homeland Security in the UK: Future Preparedness for Terrorist Attacks since 9/11 (2007)

=== Reviews ===
- Why Nicaragua?, a review of Nicaragua: The Sandinist Revolution by Henri Weber and Nicaragua, June 1978 - July 1979 by Susan Meiselas, in Hearn, Sheila G. (ed.), Cencrastus No. 10, Autumn 1982, pp. 45 & 46, ISSN 0264-0856
