= University of Cambodia =

University in Phnom Penh, Cambodia

- សាកលវិទ្យាល័យកម្ពុជា
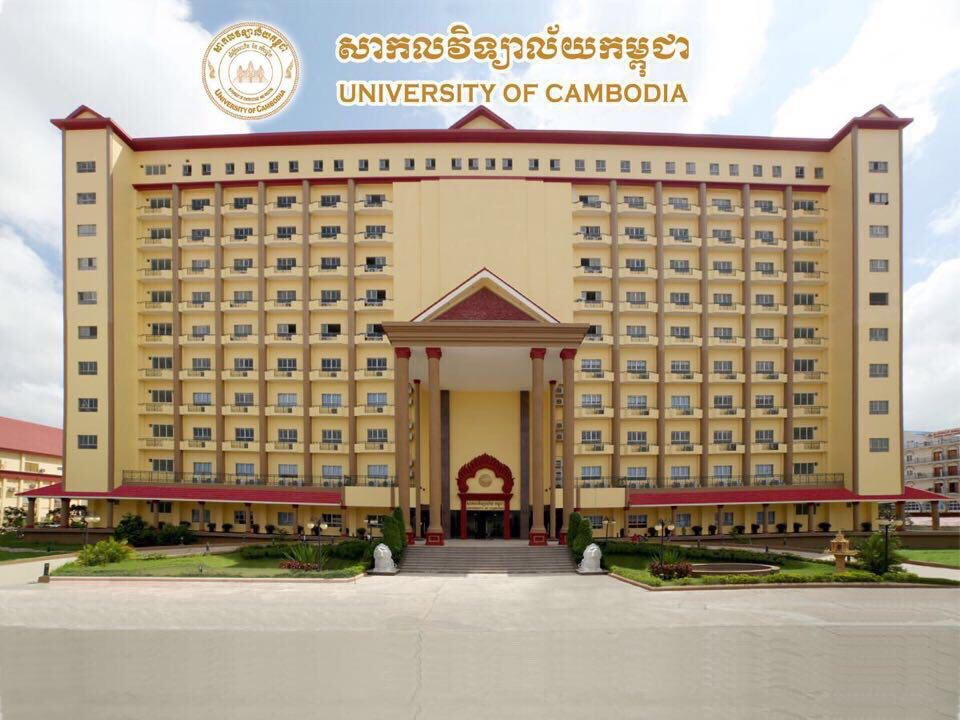
- Motto: "In Pursuit of Knowledge and Wisdom, and Building Tomorrow's Leaders" (ដើម្បីចំណេះដឹង គតិបណ្ឌិត និងការស្ថាបនាអ្នកដឹកនាំទៅអនាគត)
- Type: Private
- Established: 23 June 2003; 23 years ago
- Founders: Dr. Kao Kim Hourn; Dr. Haruhisa Handa
- Affiliations: Accreditation Committee of Cambodia (ACC); Cambodian Higher Education Association (CHEA); Association of Universities of Asia and the Pacific (AUAP); Association of Southeast Asian Institutions of Higher Learning (ASAIHL); Cambodian Private Universities Alliance; International Association of Universities; United Nations Sustainable Development Solutions Network
- Chancellor: Dr. Haruhisa Handa
- President: LCT. Khem Rany
- Location: Northbridge Road, Sangkat Toek Thla, Khan Sen Sok, P.O. Box 917, Phnom Penh, Cambodia
- Campus: Urban
- Symbolic tree: Palm tree
- Colors: Green, Gold, and Blue
- Nickname: UC
- Mascot: Rabbit
- Website: www.uc.edu.kh www.facebook.com/universityofcambodia

The University of Cambodia (UC; Khmer: សាកលវិទ្យាល័យកម្ពុជា, Sakalvityealai Kampuchea) is a private university located on North bridge Road in Sen Sok District, Phnom Penh, Kingdom of Cambodia. Founded in 2003 by Dr. Kao Kim Hourn, minister delegate to the prime minister of Cambodia, and Dr. Haruhisa Handa, founder and chairman of the International Foundation for Arts and Culture. UC is accredited by the Royal Government of Cambodia and the Accreditation Committee of Cambodia, and is a member of the Cambodian Higher Education Association.

The university is organized to provide foundation year, associate, bachelor's, master's and doctoral programs through its twelve colleges and schools: the college of arts and humanities, the college of education, the college of law, the college of media and communications, the college of science and technology, the college of social sciences, the school of creative arts, the school of foreign languages, the Techo Sen School of Government and International Relations, and The Tony Fernandes School of Business (formerly the College of Management). Additionally, the school of graduate studies oversees the university's graduate programs, and the school of undergraduate studies manages the undergraduate programs.

As a model, the university uses the credit-based system that is used in the United States, and the programs are taught through the medium of the English language. In 2013, the university launched the Khmer Track, which offers the same UC programs, but taught in the medium of the Khmer (Cambodian) language. UC subsequently renamed the existing English language programs the International Track. In October 2022, LCT. Khem Rany was appointed as the Acting President, succeeding Dr. Kao Kim Hourn who stepped down to take a new position as Secretary-General of ASEAN.

== Academics ==
=== Admissions ===
The University of Cambodia admits graduate and undergraduate students three times per year: late October, late February, and late June. However, students at the Department for English Studies can enroll at five different times per year on a rotating schedule.

=== Colleges and schools ===
The University of Cambodia is home to six colleges and six schools: the college of arts and humanities (CoAH), the college of education (CoE), the college of law (CoL), the college of media and communications (CMC), the college of science and technology (CoST), the college of social sciences (CoSS), the school of creative arts (SCA), the school of foreign languages (SFL), the Techo Sen School of Government and International Relations (TSS), and The Tony Fernandes School of Business (formerly the College of Management). The university offers associate, bachelor's, master's, and doctoral degrees in a variety of majors. Three of its master's programs have been ranked as some of the top programs in their fields in Far East Asia, according to Eduniversal.

==== College of arts and humanities (CoAH) ====
The college of arts and humanities at the University of Cambodia offers six different majors. The college contains three departments: department of sociology and anthropology, department of social work, and department of literature and cultural studies and offers AA, BA, MA, and doctoral degrees.

==== College of education (CoE) ====
The college of education at the University of Cambodia offers programs in three departments: department of educational science, department of educational administration, and department of curriculum design and instruction and offers AA, BA, MEd, and doctoral degrees.

==== College of law (CoL) ====
The college of law at the University of Cambodia offers a total of five programs: three bachelor's degree (BA) programs, one master's degree (MA) program, and one Doctoral Degree (PhD) program. These degrees are offered through three departments: department of law, department of public and private law, and department of international law.

==== College of media and communications (CMC) ====
The college of media and communications at The University of Cambodia offers a total of four BA programs in three different departments: department of media and arts studies, department of visual communications, and department of communications studies Additionally, the college of media and communications offers eight short course programs. The CMC was established by the only university in the country that has its own media and communications systems to support the teaching and learning practices of students in the fields of media and communications, as it partners with nearby Southeast Asia Television (SEATV), Southeast Asia Radio or FM 106, and Southeast Asia Production.

==== College of science and technology (CoST) ====
The college of science and technology at the University of Cambodia offers a variety of programs, including AA, BS, MS, and doctoral degree programs, from three different departments: department of information technology, department of computer science, and department of electronics and telecommunications.

==== College of social sciences (CoSS) ====
The college of social science at the University of Cambodia has three departments: department of politics and international relations: department of public policy & administration, and department of development studies. It offers AA, BA, MA, and Doctoral programs.

==== School of creative arts (SCA) ====
Approved by the Ministry of Education, Youth and Sport in May 2018, the school of creative arts offers three study programs for students in three departments: department of arts music and song, department of arts dance, and department of dramatic arts.

==== School of foreign languages (SFL) ====
Also approved by the Ministry of Education, Youth and Sport in May 2018, the school of foreign languages contains five departments: department of English language, department of French language, department of Chinese language, department of Japanese language, and department of Korean language, and offers AA, BA, and MA programs.

==== Techo Sen School of Government and International Relations (TSS) ====
The Techo Sen School of Government and International Relations (TSS) at The University of Cambodia contains three different departments: DEPARTMENT of ASEAN studies, department of diplomacy and international relations, and department of public administration and public policy. Additionally TSS conducts nonpartisan research. TSS is housed on the 10th floor of the building. It was officially approved to offer MA and Doctoral degree programs by the Ministry of Education, Youth, and Sport on 31 December 2014.

==== The Tony Fernandes School of Business (formerly the College of Management) ====
On 10 May 2017, the UC School of Business was renamed the Tony Fernandes School of Business after Tony Fernandes, the group chief executive of the AirAsia Group. The Tony Fernandes School of Business offers AA, BA, MA, and doctoral degree programs through four departments: department of accounting and finance, department of management, department of entrepreneurship and strategy, and department of marketing. The Tony Fernandes School of Business was ranked by Eduniversal as the top business school in Cambodia, with "2 Palmes of Excellence," for its high-quality instruction and strong regional influence.

==== The School of undergraduate studies (SUS) ====
Endorsed by the Ministry of Education, Youth, and Sport, the school of undergraduate studies is the coordinating body for all undergraduate programs over 6 colleges and 3 schools, which currently provide 9 associate degree programs and 39 bachelor's degree programs.

==== The School of graduate studies (SGS) ====
The school of graduate studies works with all the colleges and schools to spread information about UC's offerings as well as the value of graduate degrees to prospective students. The school also works in guiding graduate students during their time at UC, and answers any questions they may have. The school oversees the 24 master's degree programs, as well as the 11 doctoral programs. It is also responsible for the coordination and publication of the UC Occasional Paper Series.

=== Enrollment ===
As of January 2025, The University of Cambodia has an enrollment of 4,561 students.

== Scholarships ==
The University of Cambodia has offered thousands of scholarships to students, both undergraduate and graduate, since its inception in 2003. The Office of Scholarships manages and oversees the university scholarships in collaboration with other offices and UC entities. Examinations are offered annually and cover both English and general knowledge, and the top students earn free tuition for the duration of their program. The scholarships themselves are named the Samdech Techo Hun Sen Vision-100 Scholarships with other monikers attached to them, depending on the donor. Sponsors for these particular scholarships have included Dr. Haruhisa Handa, Dr. Rikhi Thakral, Mr. Paul Heng, and China Fairwind, Cambodia. Other scholarships have been donated by Khmer Brewery, Cambodia Advance Communications, and The University of Cambodia. Several hundred additional UC students have received personal scholarships, meaning private donors funded their education at UC specifically and no scholarship exam was required. For Academic Year 2017-2018, the university offered several hundred scholarships called the Samdech Techo Hun Sen's Vision 500 Scholarships-2017, and for Academic Year 2018-2019, UC held a strict examination for scholarships under the name Samdach Techo Hun Sen's Vision 2030. In 2021, UC is offering 500 scholarships under the UC Peace Scholarships 2021-2025, and recipients will once again be chosen by a competitive exam.

== Facilities ==
The University of Cambodia's 11-story main-campus building is smoke-free and handicapped-accessible and features elevators and ramps. The outside grounds hold a variety of local vegetation including palm trees, car and motorbike parking, and a canteen. The UC Sports Complex is located in the rear grounds and offers both a football (soccer) field and volleyball nets. Welcoming visitors on the first floor is a statue of Samdech Preah Javaraman VII, King of Cambodia during the Angkor Era. On the 11th floor, there is a Coffee Today shop, copy and print center, and the UC Bookstore.

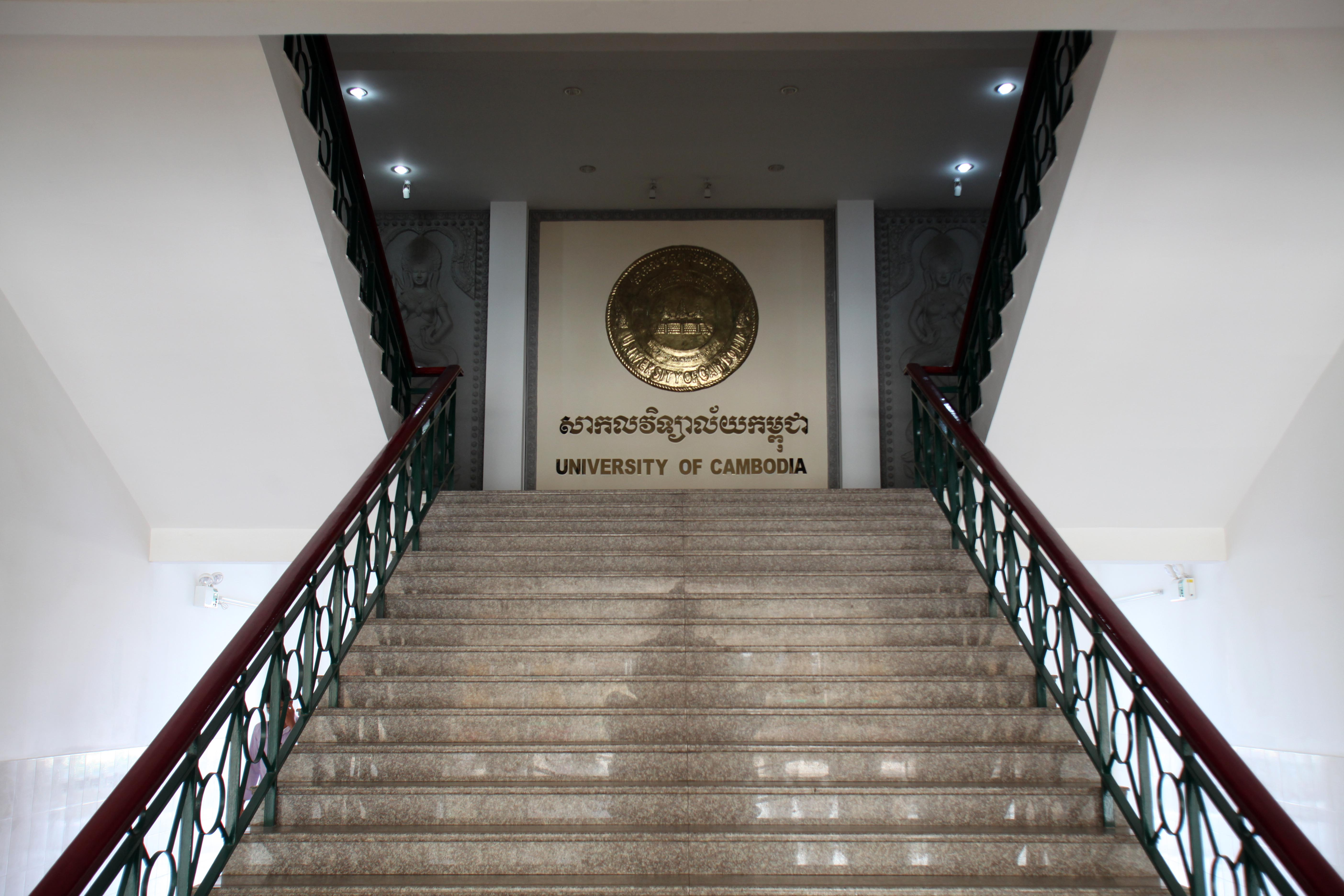
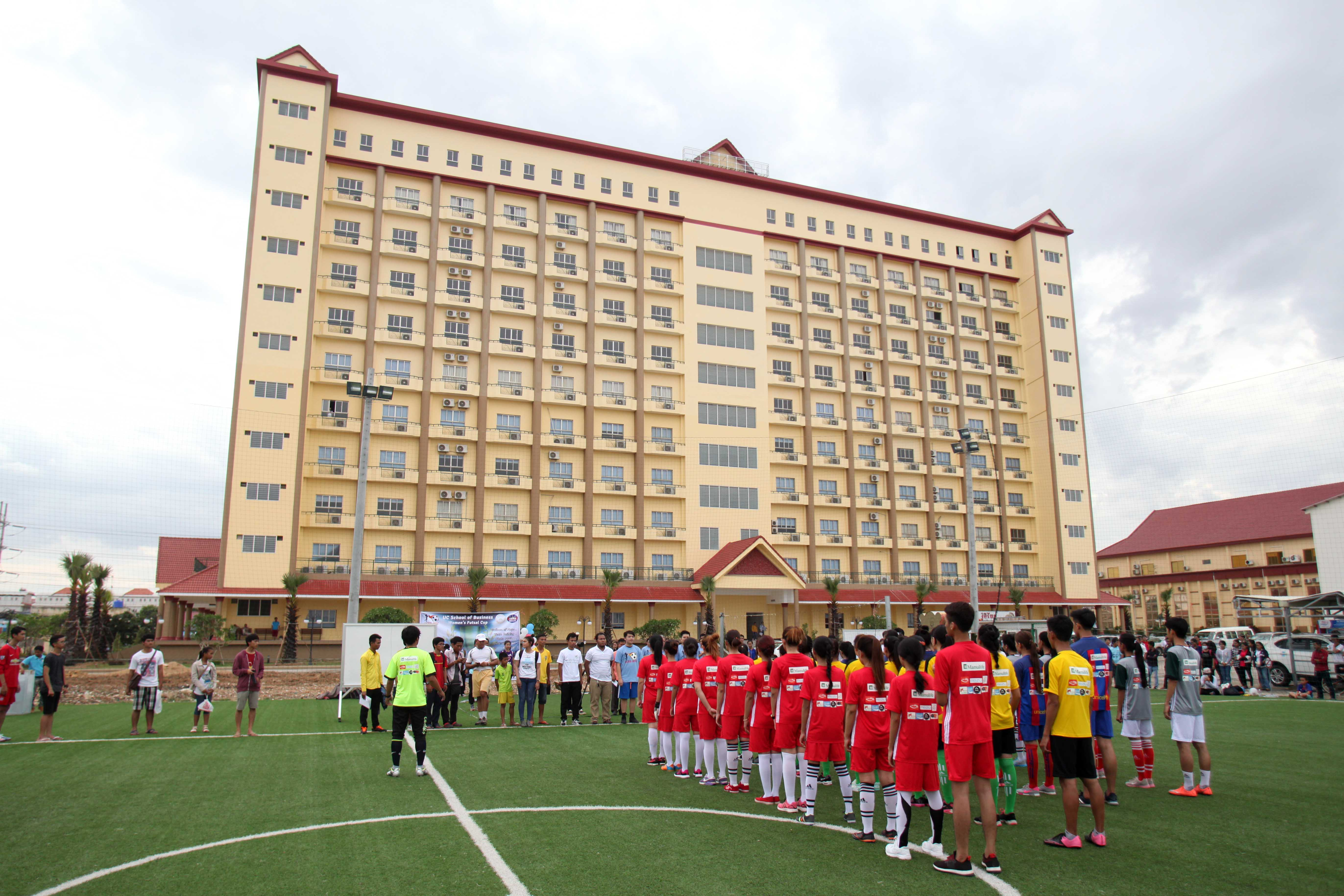

=== The Handa Library ===
UC's Handa Library has a collection of more than 100,000 books, magazines, newspapers, and periodicals in several languages as well as computers to access online journals. The Handa E-Library offers a number of computers for students to use for their studies. The Handa Library and E-Library are open seven days a week to students, staff, faculty, and the public. The E-Library also contains the ASEAN Resource Center, which is a collection of books pertaining to ASEAN.

=== Laboratories ===
As of 2009, the school has been introducing e-learning for some of its programs. There are now four separate laboratories at UC, including the Computer Repair Lab, the IT Center Lab, the Language and Multimedia Lab, and the Networking Lab.

=== Southeast Asia Television and Radio ===
Southeast Asia Television (SEATV) and Radio has been a long-standing partner of The University of Cambodia and is located on the university's campus. SEATV serves as a training center for the College of Media and Communications, where students can learn hands-on from the experts. SEATV also hosts and broadcasts several UC events, such as the annual graduation, and then airs them, along with UC TV and radio commercials.

== Research ==
In conjunction with the university's colleges and schools, UC has set up specific institutes and centers to coordinate research and training efforts across academic disciplines. The university operates the Institute for Research and Advanced Studies (IRAS), the Council for Research and Creativity, the ASEAN Study Center (ASC), the Skills and Career Development Center (SCDC), the Center for English Studies (CES), and the Asia Leadership Center (ALC). Additionally, the university has established numerous think tanks including the Asia Economic Forum in May 2005, and later, the Asian Faiths Development Dialogue. Over the past few years, UC has launched a number of new publications, including the Cambodian Journal of International Studies, Monograph Series, Occasional Paper Series, Working Paper Series, and UC Bulletin. They can be found in print and online.

== Alumni ==
To date, UC has held 18 annual graduations and has over 20,000 alumni in both degree and non-degree programs.

=== Notable alumni ===
==== Academia ====
- Dr. Hong Kim Cheang, president of Kampong Speu Institute of Technology, Ministry of Education, Youth and Sport
- H.E. Dr. Luy Channa, rector of the Royal University of Law and Economics (RULE)

==== Government ====
- H.E. Amb. Nong Sakal, Ambassador Extraordinary and Plenipotentiary of Cambodia to Belgium/European Union
- Mrs. Touch Sopharath, Deputy Director General of General Department of International Cooperation
- H.E. Amb. Ko Ko Shein, Ambassador Extraordinary and Plenipotentiary of the Republic of the Union of Myanmar to Russia
- H.E. Dr. General Neang Phat, Permanent Secretary of State of the Ministry of National Defense, Royal Government of Cambodia
- H.E. Dr. General Nem Sowath, Advisor to the Royal Government in Charge of History, Special Adviser of Samdech Pichey Sena Tea Banh, Deputy Prime Minister and Minister of National Defense and Director General of General Department of Policy and Foreign Affairs.
- H.E. Samraing Kamsan, Secretary of State of the Ministry of Culture and Fine Arts (Cambodia), Royal Government of Cambodia
- H.E. Meas Vibol, Member of SPM Assistant at Council of Minister with the Rank of Under Secretary of State
- H.E. Sor Soputra, Deputy Governor of Kampong Speu Province (អភិបាលរង នៃគណៈអភិបាលខេត្តកំពង់ស្ពឺ)
- Mr. I Sokleng, Provincial Governor of Sihanoukville Province (អភិបាលក្រុងព្រះសីហនុ)

==== International Institutions ====
- Soth Nimol, UN Coordination Specialist, Office of the UN Resident Coordinator

==== Media ====
- Puy Kea, Bureau Chief, Kyodo News

==== Non Profit ====
- Ms. Bou Molika, Country Representative of Australian Volunteers International
- Mr. Kith RathaMony, Country Director at Splash

==== Private sector ====
- Chea Sovithyea, founder and managing director at Kim Se Rice Mill
- Dr. Keo Chenda, CEO of Choronai Home, Life and Living Co., Ltd
- Lim Houng, co-founder and executive director at First Solutions (Cambodia) Co., Ltd
- Nguon Chhayleang, chief executive officer at Pointer - Real Estate Company
- Pech Sophealeak, co-founder and marketing manager of Broomstick Premium and Delivery Service
- Sam Phalla, founder of MyEyes CCTV Group
- Toch Chaochek, CEO of Cambodia Post Bank Plc
- Nguon Pheap, founder and CEO of The Mekong Diamond Co., Ltd.

== The University of Cambodia Foundation ==
The University of Cambodia Foundation (UCF) oversees the fundraising activities of the university. UCF's main function is to seek for donors to fund scholarship programs. Over 80% of UC students receive scholarships facilitated by UCF. In July 2018, UC launched The University of Cambodia Funding Campaign 2018-2023 in order to raise $300 million to provide more opportunities to young Cambodian scholars and ensure that qualified youth have access to higher education. The campaign coincides with the 15th anniversary and is designed to support UC's academic mission, vision and roadmap by emphasizing the following key areas: prioritizing students in pursuing their academic and professional goals; focusing on research, innovation and creativity; raising the standards of teaching and academic quality; and building modern learning and research environments. Additionally, donations will be geared towards eleven priorities: student scholarships and stipends; Research; Faculty & academic development/improvement; Library development; Building a new home for the Techo Sen School of Government and International Relations; Student dormitories; Science laboratories; Sports complex development; Building a new campus in Siem Reap; and establishing a new campus in Kampot.

== Award recipients ==
As of November 2022, The University of Cambodia has awarded 65 Honorary Doctoral Degrees to notable people, including Samdech Techo Prime Minister Hun Sen, Dr. Rikhi Thakral, H.E. Masajuro Shiokawa, H.E. Keat Chhon, Lord George Carey of Clifton, Dr. Takayoshi Matsui, H.E. Sok An, Prof. Katherine Marshall, Mr. Paul Wenson Heng, H.E. Rho Jun Hyong, H.E. Tea Banh, H.E. Cham Prasidh, H.E. Koji Omi, Mr. Yohei Sasakawa, Mr. Richard E. Dyck, Samdech Kittiprithbindit Bun Rany Hun Sen, H.E. Jose de Venecia Jr., H.E. Dr. Horst Posdorf, Prof. Aaron J. Ciechanover, Mr. Akishige Tada, Dr. Achyuta Samanta, Mr. Jackie Chan, H.E. José Manuel Ramos-Horta, H.E. Dr. Marty Natalegawa, Mr. Oliver Stone, Prof. Françoise Barré-Sinoussi, Dr. David Jonathan Gross, Dr. Eric S. Maskin, Prof. Torsten Nils Wiesel, H.E. Sichan Siv, H.E. Khieu Kanharith, Prof. Ito Kenichi, Dr. Gregory Alan Emery, Dr. Ralph A. Cossa, Prof. David Cohen, Mr. Wang Jiemin, Oknha Dr. Chear Ratana, H.E. Dr. Philipp Rosler, Prof. Din Merican, Tan Sri Tony Fernandes, H.E. Dr. S.C. Jamir, Justice Dalveer Bhandari, H.E. Dr. Dionisio da Costa Babo Soares, Dato Sri Prof. Dr. Tahir, MBA, H.E. CHEA Thory, H.E. Kay Rala Xanana Gusmão, H.E. Chuon Sovann, Dr. M.A. Bintoro Dibyoseputro, H.E. Mr. Rudy Huang, Mr. Adi Sugandi, Ms. Natasya, Prof. Jeffrey Cheah, Prof. Wing Thye Woo, Prof. Jeffrey Sachs, H.E. General Kittibindit Hing Bunhieng, H.E. General Eth Sarath, H.E. Sry Thamarong, Mr. Rath Dararoth, Mr. Kam Chin Seng, H.E. Gen. Yun Min, H.E. Lt. Gen. Phok Chantha, H.E. Dr. Han Fangming among others.

UC has also conferred the Distinguished Fellow Award on Dr. Rikhi Thakral, and has presented the Distinguished Ambassador Award to H.E. Mr. Christopher B. Montero, Ambassador of the Philippines to Cambodia, and H.E. Mrs. Felicidade de Sousa Guterres, Ambassador of the Democratic Republic of Timor-Leste to the Kingdom of Cambodia. The Distinguished Professorship Award has been conferred on Professor Achyuta Samanta, Reverend Dr. Ishmael Noko, Dr. Rikhi Thakral, Dato Sri Prof. Dr. Tahir, and H.E. José Manuel Ramos-Horta, President of the Republic of Timor Leste.

== Partnerships and collaborations ==
As of today, the University of Cambodia is affiliated with over 75 institutions around the world, such as the Association of Southeast Asian Institutions of Higher Learning (ASAIHL), Association of Universities of Asia and the Pacific (AUAP), European Union Support to Higher Education in the ASEAN Region (EU-SHARE), International Association of Universities (IAU), Kalinga Institute of Social Sciences (India), Mae Fah Luang University (Thailand), and the World Economic Forum Campuchia.
