= Haruhisa Handa =

Japanese religious leader and businessman (born 1951)

Haruhisa Handa GCM AO MNZM
- 半田 晴久
- Born: 18 March 1951 (age 75); Nishinomiya, Hyōgo Prefecture, Japan
- Other names: Toshu Fukami, Shingeki no Hanshin, Toto Ami, Leonardo Toshu
- Education: Doshisha University
- Occupations: Religious leader, businessman
- Organizations: Religious leader of World Mate; CEO of International Sports Promotion Society (ISPS); Chairman of Worldwide Support for Development (WSD); Chairman of International Foundation for Arts and Culture (IFAC)
- Website: Toshu Fukami official website (in Japanese)

Haruhisa Handa (半田 晴久, Haruhisa Handa; born 18 March 1951) is a Japanese religious leader and a businessman. Handa is the chairman and spiritual leader of the Shinto-based religion World Mate. He is also known by the name Toshu Fukami (深見 東州, Tōshū Fukami) in his artistic career, as well as the pen name Toto Ami (戸渡阿見, Toto Ami). He also uses the pseudonym Leonardo Toshu (レオナルド東州, Leonarudo Tōshū), which is used as his radio personality.

Handa is the founder of the Japanese Blind Golf Association. He is a chancellor and professor of the University of Cambodia, a professor of Japan Culture Research Institute at Zhejiang Gongshang University, and an honorary consul of the Kingdom of Cambodia in Fukuoka, Japan.

== Early life and education ==
Handa was born in 1951, in Nishinomiya, Hyōgo Prefecture, Japan, into a multi-generation sake-barrel manufacturing family. In his adolescence, Handa began reading approximately a book a day. He graduated from Doshisha University in Kyoto with a Bachelor's Degree in Economics, with an emphasis in international economics. In 1998 he enrolled in the Western Australian Academy of Performing Arts (WAAPA) at Edith Cowan University (ECU) in Western Australia. In December 2002 at 51, he completed the course and was awarded a master's degree and bachelor's degree of Fine Arts and Creative Arts by WAAPA. In 2006 he completed his Doctor of Letters at the Academy of Arts and Design of Tsinghua University, China and was awarded the Doctor of Chinese Classics from Zhejiang University, China. Over his career he has earned an Honorary Doctorate of Humane Letters from The Juilliard School, been named an Honorary Fellow of Corpus Christi College at the University of Oxford, an Honorary Fellow at the School of Oriental and African Studies of London University (SOAS), and an honorary doctorate from the University of Gloucestershire. He has also received honorary doctorates from the University of Western Australia, Curtin University, and Edith Cowan University in Western Australia.

== Early career ==
After undergraduate school, Handa began his employment at Daiwa House located in Tokyo. In 1978, he resigned from his position and established Misuzu Gakuen, a prep school run by Misuzu Co. Ltd.

== International organizations ==
During the early 1980s, Handa began developing businesses in Perth, Western Australia. In 1988, he was introduced to blind golf after he had met with those in Australia who had formed it in Perth; he then brought it to Japan and established the Japanese Blind Golf Association and in 1997, he started the International Blind Golf Association (IBGA). In 1996 he established the International Foundation for Arts and Culture (IFAC). Handa is also the cofounder of the Sihanouk Hospital in Phnom Penh, Cambodia.

In 2000 Handa cofounded the Spring Bud elementary school in China. In 2006 he established the International Sports Promotion Society (ISPS) and founded the University of Cambodia, later serving as the Chancellor and as a professor. He launched Akarusugiru Gekidan Tōshu (明るすぎる劇団・東州, The Too Lighthearted Theater Company – Toshu) for popular Japanese theater in May 2007, at the age of 56. In 2008 he established Worldwide Support for Development (WSD), where he currently serves as chair.

== Artistic career ==
Handa received no formal musical education during his childhood, and began training in various art forms during his thirties and forties, including in tea ceremonies, Noh theatre, the piano, the violin, musical composition, Peking opera, conducting, music theory, and then ballet at the age of 42. In 1994 he worked as a conductor at the Albert Hall, when he booked the building in order to produce a multi-genre dance and musical performance. His debut in opera came in March 1997 (see below), and in the same year, at the age of 46, he completed Musashino Academia Musicae Parnassos Eminence. On 21 September 1997, he held the Toshu Fukami Calligraphy and Painting Charity Exhibition, the first exhibition of his calligraphy and paintings.

In 1999, he led the Alps Choir in performances of both original songs and traditional Japanese songs at the Vatican, having been granted an audience with the Pope. In 2000, he created a new stage art in the form of Hagoromo (羽衣), a production fusing Noh and ballet, where he performed classical ballet alongside a prima ballerina. That year he exhibited his eight-meter ink painting Great Long View of Lake Motosu, among others, at the Toshu Fukami – Japanese Calligraphy and Painting Exhibition, held at the Forbidden Castle, Beijing, and demonstrated impromptu painting in ink at the venue.

In October 2002 he was awarded the title of First Grade Opera Singer by the China National Opera & Dance Drama Theater, for the first time outside of China, and became a regular member and international arts adviser to the company. On 14 November 2002, he performed the role of Prince Shōtoku in the opera Shotoku Taishi – Wa o Motte Toutoshi to Nasu (『聖徳太子』和を以て貴しとなす, literally, Prince Shōtoku – Harmony is to be valued), for which he was also the executive producer.

In December 2003, he held a concert with the Australian and Chinese performers called Great Japanese, Chinese and Australian Singers' Joint Performance – An Evening of Classical Opera, featuring himself as the Japanese singer, at the Grand Palace of the People's Theater in Beijing. On 2 September 2004, he performed the role of Marcello in the opera Taishō Jidai no La bohème (大正時代のラ・ボエーム, literally, La bohème in the Taishō Era). On 30 May 2004, he premiered of the opera Yang Guifei in Beijing, performing the role of Akao, which received generally favorable reviews in the Chinese press. On 15 September 2005, he performed the title role of The Marriage of Figaro in the opera Hinamatsuri no Figaro no Kekkon (雛祭りのフィガロの結婚, literally, The Marriage of Figaro at the Hinamatsuri). During this time, The Shaanxi Daily wrote about his dedication towards contributing to China-Japanese cultural exchange. On 27 September 2009, he performed the title role in the opera Zeus no Keshin Kaijin Don Giovanni. In 2012, he performed the title role in Don Pasquale in the first Grand Opera Japan, a performance with Opera Australia in Japan, and the first joint production in Japan.

In addition to opera, he is also active as a singer-songwriter of popular music, and has conducted more than 30 concerts both in Japan and other countries. In 2008, he gave eight songs he wrote and composed, including "Jidanda!" (ジダンダ!, kick oneself), to Akira Kobayashi. "Jidanda!" reached number 1 on the Weekly Hit Enka Ballad/J-pop USEN Chart and ranked 28th in requests for the entire year of 2009. Handa funds charity concerts to raise awareness about human rights and poverty issues. In September, he performed together with Michael Bolton and Peter Cetera at the Toshu Fukami and His Friends from Around the World Concert Tour. In August 2010, The Works of Toshu Fukami, featuring 154 of Handa's works, was published by Kyūryūdo.

He is on the board of trustees of the Japan Design Cultural Association and markets his own fashion label. As a visual artist, he received the title Honorary Artist by the City of Perth, Australia.

== Patronage ==
Through the International Foundation for Arts and Culture, he is Patron-in-Chief of Opera Australia which has staged Handa Opera on Sydney Harbour, an outdoor opera production using a special floating stage every year since 2012 as. His relationship with Opera Australia will end on the 31st December 2026, with bank HSBC taking on the role of principal partner of the Principal partner of the Sydney Harbour Production.

Handa became the Patron in Chief with The Internaional Foundation for Arts and Culture becoming principal partner of Opera at Millthorpe in October 2026 with the organisation rebranding as Handa Opera at Millthorpe. Former Opera Australia Artistic Direct Lyndon Terracini is Artistic Direct and CEO of Handa Opera at Millthorpe.

== Partnerships ==
Handa has worked in association with Michael Bolton, Jimi Jamison, and Peter Cetera. Bolton and Handa specifically have worked on various projects regarding the promotion of human rights activities. He has also worked with Bill Clinton. When David Helfgott visited Japan for the first time in 1991, he played and recorded works composed by Handa for Helfgott, including the Andromeda Fantasia and a collection of small piano pieces. Helfgott Live in Japan 91 is the only existing video recording in the world of Helfgott playing live. Handa has partnered with Nick Faldo to produce the Handa Faldo Cambodian Classic. Handa also serves as the Official International Ambassador for the Faldo Series Asia and as Honorary Advisor to the Faldo Trust for Tomorrow's Champions (Asia) Limited.

== Literary activities ==
In 2007 Handa published the novel Tokage. In November 2008, his second novel, Batta Ni Dakarete, was selected as a Japan Library Association Recommended Book. (Note: Selected annually by the Japan Library Association for the purpose of providing library information to public libraries and school libraries.) In 2000 he published his first collection of haiku, Kagerō. In 2009 his second haiku collection, Shinshu (New Autumn), was published, with 59 haiku selected by Junko Ito and another 159 selected by Touta Kaneko. As a poet, in 2009, he published Asu ni Nareba – Toto Ami Shishū in March, Halley Suisei – Totoami Shishū in April and Awadatsu Kocha – Toto Ami Shishū in August. He then published Majo no Medama – Toto Ami Shishū in May 2011. He is Director of the Toshu Haiku Society and a member of the Gendai Haiku Association. His haiku are included in the Gendai Haiku database.

== Noh ==
Handa is a member of the Nohgaku Performers' Association and a lead actor in the Hosho School of Noh theater and the sponsor representative of the Tokyo Dai Takigi Noh (Tokyo Grand Open-Air Noh). As of September 2012, he had made over 40 appearances as lead actor. He is also the head of the Toshu Hosho Noh Troupe, which has over 1,500 affiliated members. In 1998 Handa established the Hosho Toshu Noh Troupe. In 1999 he performed in the lead roles in the Noh play Fuji at the Hosho Nohgaku Theater, and on 1 and 2 June he held public Noh performances alongside the head of the Hoshu School at the United Nations Plaza and The Metropolitan Museum of Art in New York. Later that year, on 28 September, he performed in the lead roles in the Noh play Iwafune at the second Tokyo Dai Takigi Noh, at the Citizens Plaza, Tokyo Metropolitan Government Building.

In 2000 Handa staged a takigi Noh at the National Academy of Chinese Theatre Arts and Peking University, performing the lead role in Midare, and held public performances of Hosho School Noh in China, at Peking University and at the National Academy of Chinese Theatre Arts, where he performed the lead role in the Noh play Midare (乱).

On 1 June 2001, he staged the Egyptian Sphinx Takigi Noh, a performance of Noh, which was inscribed on the UNESCO (United Nations Educational, Scientific and Cultural Organization) World Heritage List (as intangible heritage) in May of the same year. In the performance he played the lead role (White lion) in the Half-Noh play Shakkyō (Renjishi), in front of the Great Sphinx of Giza, which was inscribed on the World Heritage List in 1979. Later that year on 19 September, he performed the lead role (White lion) in the Noh play Shakkyō at the China National Children's Theatre in Beijing. And on 25 September, he performed the lead role (White lion) in the Noh play Shakkyō (Renjishi, 石橋連獅子), at the 4th Tokyo Dai Takigi Noh.

In 2002 he played the lead role in the Noh play Okina (Old Man) at the Hosho Toshu Noh Troupe National Festival. Two days later, on 6 August, he staged a takigi Noh performance at Kashima Shrine in the Kashima Shrine Boat Festival Offertory Performance, performing the lead role in the Noh play Okina, which was so well attended there was little room for the standing crowd to move. Then on 27 September, he performed the lead role in Okina again, at the 5th Tokyo Dai Takigi Noh at Telecom Center.

On 3 August 2003, he staged the Hosho Toshu Noh Troupe 5th Anniversary Festival at the Hosho Noh Theater, performing the lead role (the emperor) in the Noh play Tsurukame (鶴亀). Then on 30 September, he staged the 6th Tokyo Dai Takigi Noh at Sun Plaza in Shiokaze Park, Odaiba, performing the lead role (the emperor) in the Noh play Tsurukame.

== Blind golf ==
Handa introduced blind golf to Japan in 1988 by establishing its first Blind Golf Club and today is Honorary Chairman of the Japanese Blind Golf Association and Honorary President of the International Blind Golf Association. (Note: Allied with Blind Golf Associations in 17 regions in 15 countries around the world including the United States, the United Kingdom, Australia, Canada, and Japan) He has stated that because the blind golfers he witnessed playing in Australia were the most cheerful, pleasant, and happy people with a disability he had ever met, he began developing worldwide activities to promote blind golf as social contribution through golf in the private sector.

In 1997, he established the International Blind Golf Association (IBGA). As of March 2014, 18 organizations had joined the International Blind Golf Association, with he serving as Honorary President. Handa launched the ISPS Handa PGA Academy Program in January 2012 to disseminate disability classification in golf and to provide British PGA pro golfers with the qualifications to coach disabled golfers, through the ISPS and the PGA in the United Kingdom. He has also been involved with working to spread disabled golf internationally, with the goal of it becoming an official sport in the Paralympics.

Handa is the first Japanese person to serve as Vice President of The Royal National Institute of Blind People (RNIB). In 2010, he was bestowed with the Asia-Pacific Golf Personality Award. His work with women's golf led to the 2006 launch of an annual women's senior pro tournament sponsored by the Legends Tour, the Handa Cup (Handa being his real surname), as a Legends Tour event in the Ryder Cup and Solheim Cup. The tournament's title was changed to the ISPS Handa Cup in 2013. He serves as a Golf Australia Advisor and International Ambassador.

== Religious activities ==
Hansa serves as Trustee of World Faiths Development Dialogue (WFDD) and Honorary International Advisor on the International Advisory Committee in the Parliament of the World's Religions, an organization that promotes international interfaith dialog. He founded and serves as Chairman of the Asia Faiths Development Dialogue (AFDD), which promotes development of dialog among religions in Asia. He is also one of the Presidents of Religions for Peace USA.

Handa began studying and practicing Zen, Shinto, and Chinese philosophy at the age of 25. In 1984, he founded the Shinto-based religious organization World Mate. In 2001, he established the Toshu Fukami Shinto Studies chair in the Religious Studies Department at Columbia University. As head of ISF, he cosponsored the 4th Inter-Faith Action for Peace in Africa (IFAPA) Summit in Johannesburg, South Africa from 28 to 30 October 2012. He was one of two religious leaders representing Japan, who propounded a means of resolving problematic issues.

He is an Honorary Advisor to the Human Rights Council of Australia, established the first chair in human rights education in Australia, at Curtin University, Western Australia, and was bestowed the title of Citizen of Humanity by the Human Rights Council of Australia. He also established the WSD HANDA Center for Human Rights and International Justice at Stanford University. Handa serves as Chairman of the Kyowa (Harmony of All People) Foundation.

== Boards ==
Handa serves as a director at The Japan Forum on International Relations, a private policy think tank. He also serves as Chairman of Worldwide Support for Development, which engages in international cooperation and support projects in welfare, scholarship, and education. Additionally Handa also served as Chairman of the Cambodian international meetings titled Bridge, held from April 2009 to April 2010.

== Educational activities ==
=== Chancellor and professor – University of Cambodia ===
He serves as the Chancellor of the University of Cambodia, which was opened in 2003. He has served as a professor at the university since January 2006.

The name of the library on campus was changed to Toshu Fukami Library on 30 April 2004. The library houses a collection of some 50,000 books, making it one of the best libraries in Cambodia. In 2007, World Mate provided funds for the Samdech Hun Sen – Handa National scholarship, which bears the names of the Prime Minister Hun Sen and him. The scholarship enables 500 students with outstanding grades to enroll at the university tuition-free each year and obtain a bachelor's degree. The scholarship funded 500 students each year between 2007 and 2009, for a total of 1,500 students. He established the Chancellor's Honors Scholarship Fund in 2012 and has been providing full tuition fees to academically advanced students since then.

=== Professor – Institute for Japanese Culture Studies, Zhejiang Gongshang University ===
He has held posts as Visiting Professor at the Post-Graduate Japanese Culture Research Center in Zhejiang University since September 1998 and as Professor of Japanese Arts and Culture at the School of Japanese Language and Culture at Zhejiang Gongshang University since September 2007, both in China. Currently, he is Professor of Japanese Arts and Culture at the Institute for Japanese Culture Studies at Zhejiang Gongshang University. In his work at the university, he specializes in lectures on the topic of Japanese culture and its spiritual background and demonstrates culture and arts including Noh, calligraphy, Japanese painting and haiku; and his discussions focus on the impact that Shinto, Buddhism, and Confucianism have had on Japanese culture, including topics such as Japanese myths and management practices, and the Japanese syncretized Shinto-Buddhist artistic view manifest in the Noh play Fuji (Wisteria).

=== Honorary consul of the Kingdom of Cambodia in Fukuoka ===
He serves as Honorary Consul of the Kingdom of Cambodia in Fukuoka. Every year since 2009, the Consulate of the Kingdom of Cambodia in Fukuoka has publicly called for applicants for the Handa scholarship – Study in Cambodia, which provides short study trips to Cambodia.

== Honours ==
In December 2008, he was bestowed with the Grand Cross of the Royal Order of Monisaraphon as the representative of the International Foundation for Arts and Culture.

In the 2016 New Zealand Queen's Birthday Honours, Handa was appointed an honorary Member of the New Zealand Order of Merit, for services to golf and philanthropy.

On 26 May 2022, Handa was appointed an Honorary Officer of the Order of Australia, for distinguished service to the arts, education and sport through philanthropic contributions.
