= Lom =

Lom or LOM may refer to:

== People ==
- Lom people, a Romani group, mainly in the Caucasus
- Herbert Lom, Czech-British film actor
- Iain Lom, Scottish Gaelic poet

== Places ==
=== Antarctica ===
- Lom Peak

=== Bulgaria ===
- Lom Municipality, a municipality
  - Lom, Bulgaria, a town in the municipality
- Gorni Lom, a village
- Lom (river), a river
- Rusenski Lom, a river

=== Cambodia ===
- Lom, a village in Pak Nhai

=== Czech Republic ===
- Lom (Most District), a town in the Ústí nad Labem Region
- Lom (Strakonice District), a municipality and village in the South Bohemian Region
- Lom (Tábor District), a municipality and village in the South Bohemian Region
- Lom, a village and part of Kly (Mělník District) in the Central Bohemian Region
- Lom u Tachova, a municipality and village in the Plzeň Region
- Mokrý Lom, a municipality and village in the South Bohemian Region

=== Norway ===
- Lom Municipality (Norway), a municipality
- Lom prisoner of war camp, a World War II era prisoner of war camp in Lom Municipality
- Fossbergom, also called Lom, a village within Lom Municipality

=== Slovakia ===
- Lom nad Rimavicou, a municipality and village

== Other uses ==
- Lom (album), by Seka Aleksić
- Lom (digging bar), a long metal hand tool used as a lever or to break up soil or objects
- LOM Ediciones, a Chilean publishing house

== Abbreviations ==
- LAN on motherboard, an integrated network interface controller in a computer
- Lights out management, the ability for a system administrator to monitor and manage servers by remote control
- Locator Outer Marker, a navigational aid used by aircraft
- Learning object metadata, defined as the attributes required to fully or adequately describe a learning object
- Laminated object manufacturing, a rapid prototyping technology developed by Helisys
- Legion of Merit, a military decoration of the United States
- Wings Field Airport (FAA LID airport code "LOM"), Philadelphia, Pennsylvania
- Francisco Primo de Verdad National Airport (IATA airport code "LOM")
- Olympique de Marseille, a French football club, sometimes referred to as l'OM
- Lord of Mysteries, a 2018 Chinese web novel and 2025 Chinese donghua series
