= Hunting in Cambodia =

Hunting is a popular recreational pursuit, a tourist activity in Cambodia, but mostly still a livelihood for many people in Cambodia.

== History ==
=== Angkorian era ===
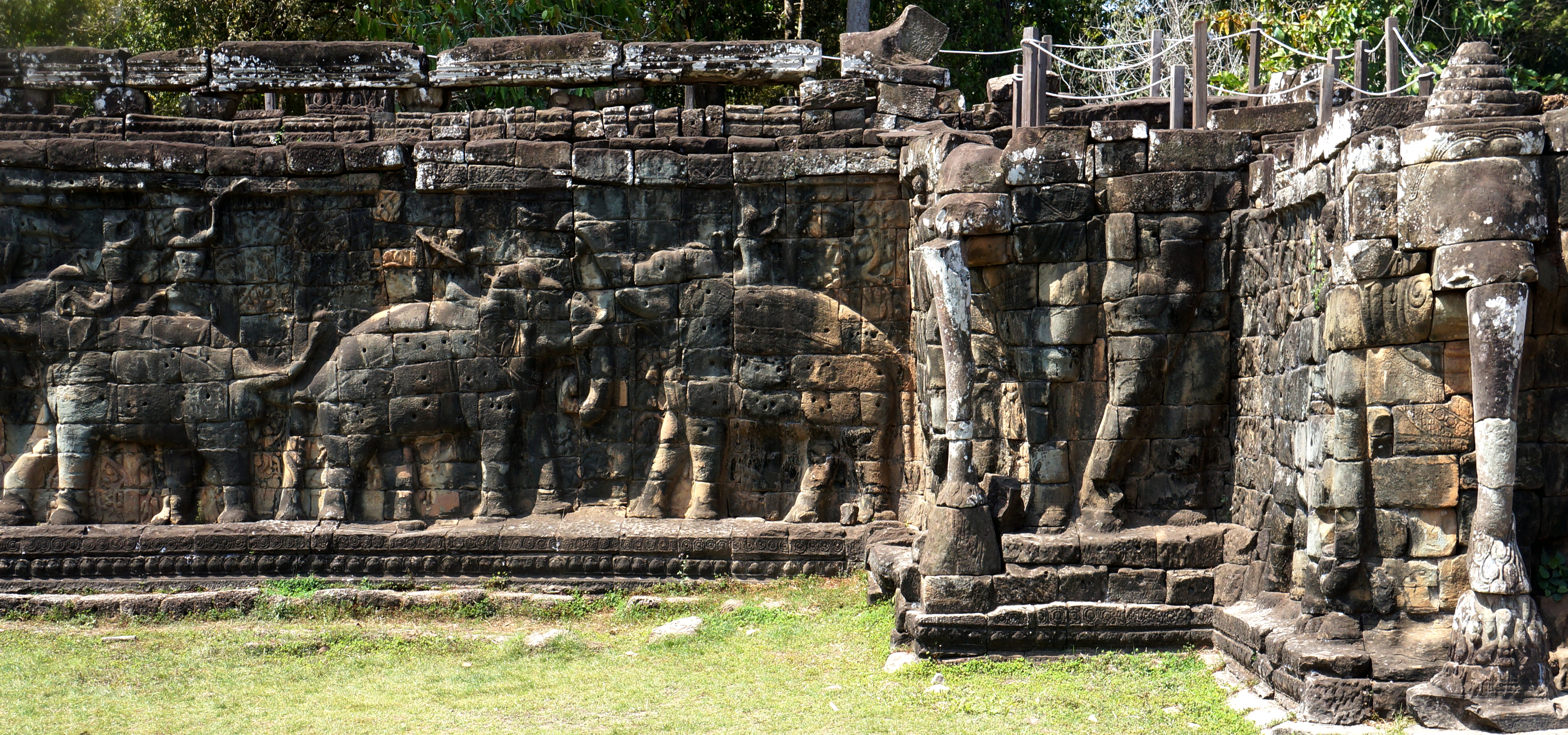
Hunting scenes with elephants can be seen carved into the wall in several places in Angkor Thom.

Hunting in Cambodia has a long tradition of being prohibited and reserved for the King, at the same time as poaching and recreational hunting are tolerated.

From ancient times, the use of the Austroasiatic crossbow as documented from archeological evidence in Angkor Wat reflecting an ancestral practise of hunting.

Elephant hunting was the most noble form of hunting with its own codes and ethics. In 1950, Chhim Krasem wrote a treaty about hunting for the office of archives and chronicles of the Royal Palace of Phnom Penh, providing a detailed academic description of the royal rite. The Commission on Cambodian costums and practises in an enquiry made in 1962 saw that the account given by the Khmer mahout was more practical but matched remarks made by Krassem. With many rites referring back the vedic religions such as the unveiling of the Ganesh dagger or kris as an ominous sign, these rites, which were last used in 1958, traced elephant hunting to its Angkorian origins.

=== French Protectorate ===
During the French protectorate of Cambodia, the hunting laws of the French Republic were applied in Cambodia; thus, the hunting season was strictly closed between the first Sunday of June and the first Sunday of November, until it was totally forbidden. This hunting season would respect reproduction cycles in a Europepan climate but was incoherent with the monsoon climate of Cambodia.

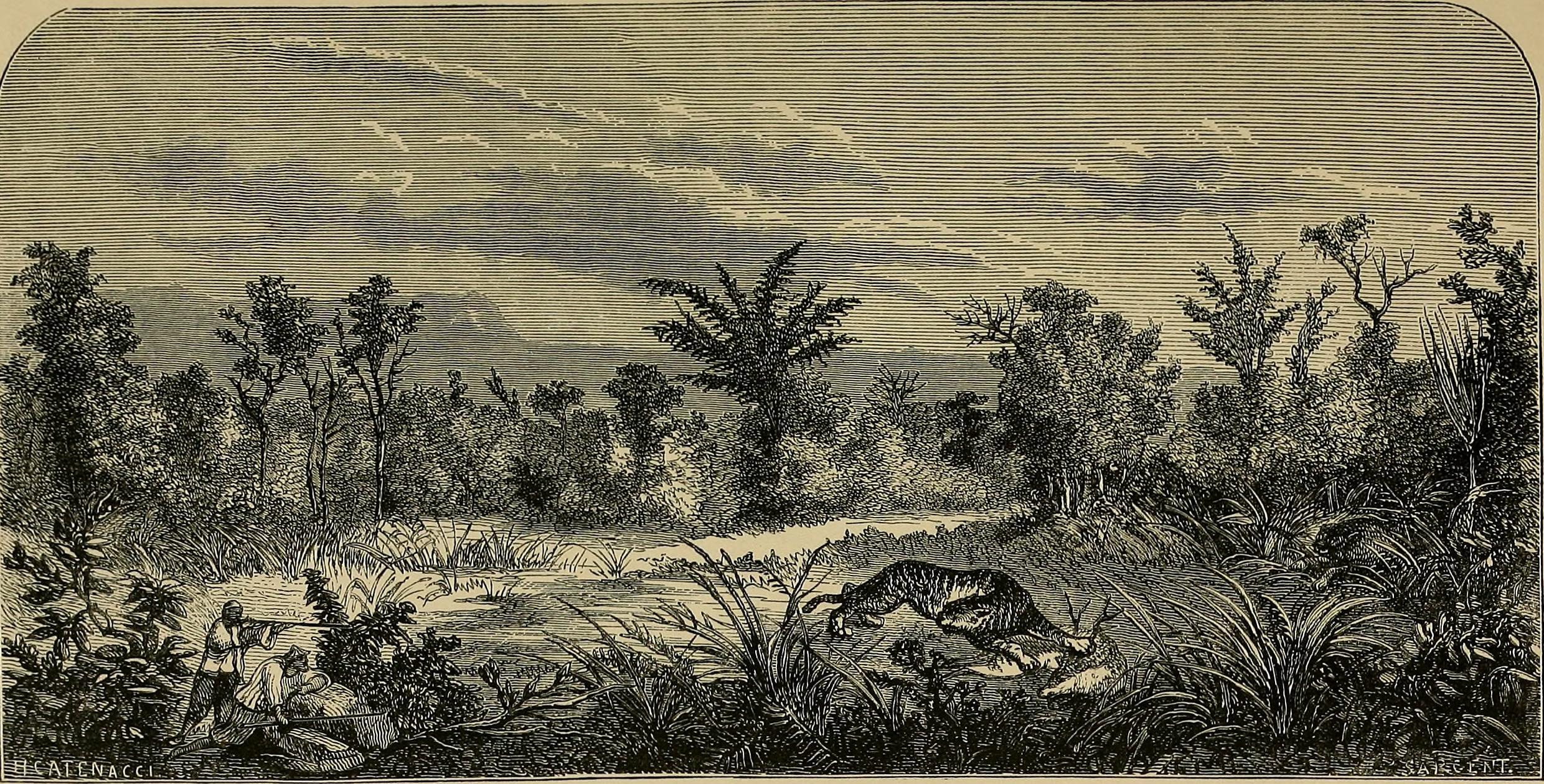
French explorer Henri Mouhot describes the joys and fears of hunting in Cambodia, as his machine guns outcompeted the Austroasiatic cross-bow.

However, hunting in Cambodia was so popular that avid hunters would come from Saigon or even the Philippines. Thus, Captain Charles P. Snyder, arrived in Cambodia from Manila in March 1928 on board the "Sisiman" loaded with guns and ammunitions to find tigers, panthers, rhinoceros, wild boar, goats. Hunters were allowed unlimited kills without any taxes being imposed.

=== Civil war era ===
In 1959, Yim Dith, secretary of state for Agriculture under the Sangkum government led by Prince Sihanouk reminded that hunting was illegal in Cambodia while Tim Dong, general delegate for Tourism declared on November 13, 1959, through the Agence Kampuchea Press that he was relying on hunting safaris to develop tourism to Cambodi, revealing tensions in leadership around the issue of hunting. Thus, according to the National Tourist Office of Cambodia planned to woo tourists 1960, Cambodia offered "some of the best hunting to be found in Asia".

Hoeur Lay Inn, deputy to the National Assembly for the Snuol district and later delegate of the Khmer Republic to the United Nations in New York, was a major promoter of hunting in Cambodia. He favoured implementing hunting seasons adapted to the Cambodian climate and punishing animal massacres and sacrifice. He lobbied in favour of hunting licenses to curb the practise of poaching:

In France, there are a few poachers and millions of hunters. In Cambodia, it is quite the opposite.

— Hoeur Lay Inn, Réalités Cambodgiennes, 27 November 1959

Poaching at that time was attributed to the Chivapols, the royal militia which was protected by Prince Sihanouk. Illegal poaching became more and more common as the nation fell into civil war and the people were left to fend for themselves while the black market plundered their natural resources.

=== Modern era ===
Since 1994, community forestry was intended to reducing poaching and deforestation in Cambodia, but results are unclear as to the success of such programs.

In 2009, the Cambodian government announced the creation of the O'Yadav Protected Forest (OPF) in Ratanakiri Province, the Kingdom's first hunting reserve, comprising around 100,000 hectares, where big-game trophy hunters are allowed to pay thousands of dollars to shoot wild animals including gaur, banteng, wild boar and deer. The project was criticized since 2007 by the WWF.

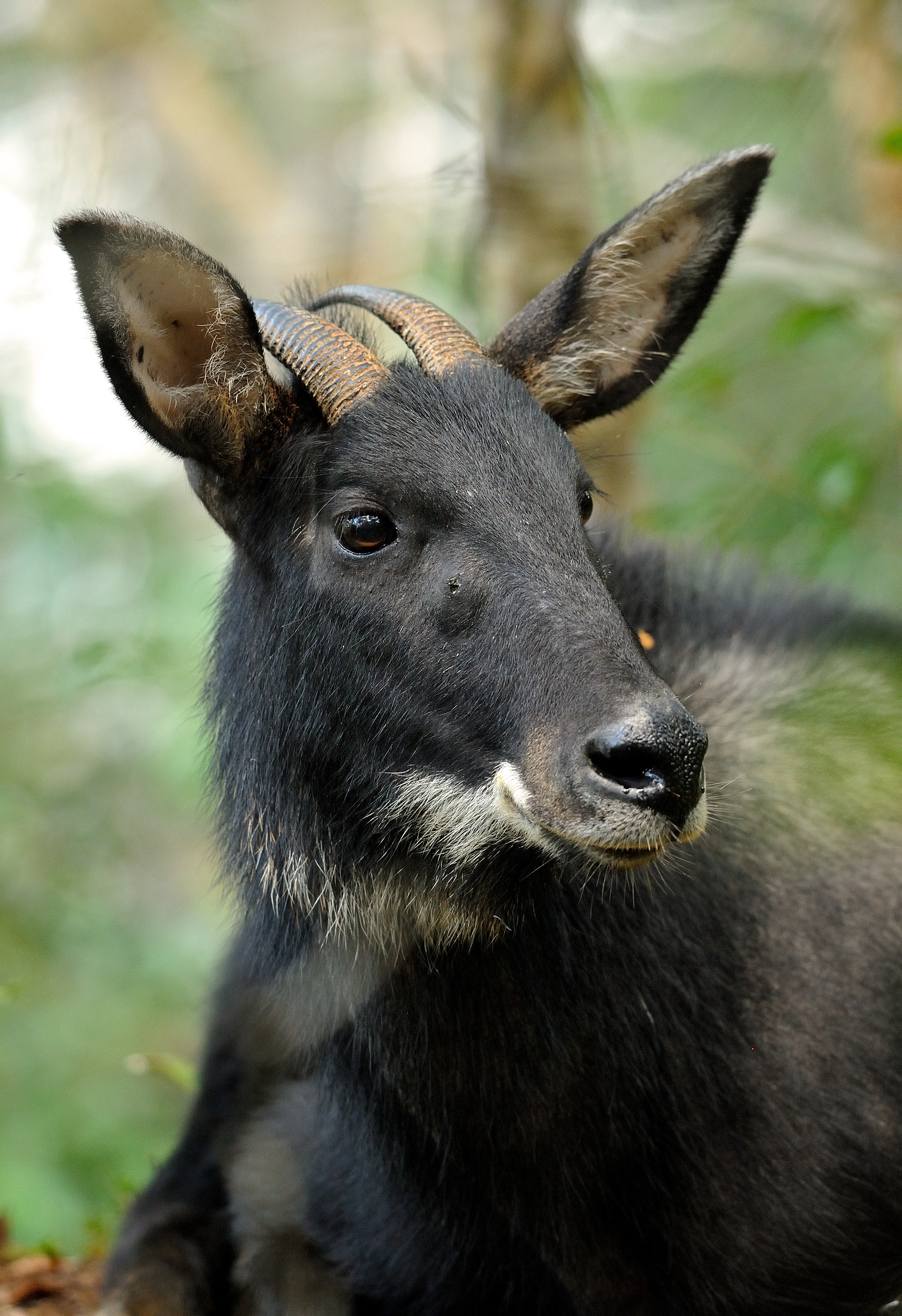
Indochinese serows are currently facing extinction in Cambodia due to poaching and habitat loss.

In May 2017, an Environment Department office in Ratanakkiri province's O’Yadav district was set on fire by villagers unhappy with officials’ efforts to curb poaching and logging. In fact, all across Cambodia, there is still a prevalent reliance on wild meat, with an estimated 83% of rural households engaged in some form of harvest.

In 2021, according to the Ministry of Environment, Cambodia deployed 1,200 rangers to guard 75 protected areas and biodiversity corridors covering 7.3 million hectares in 21 provinces across the country. However, fewer and fewer poachers are being caught.

In March 2022, the direction of the Ministry of Environment in collaboration with WWF and USAID and other development partners, launched a campaign to abolish snaring, trafficking, and the market for bush meat and wildlife products while providing livelihood alternatives for would-be poachers.

== Types of hunting ==
=== Indochinese serow ===
The Indochinese serow known in Cambodia as សត្វកែះ /sat kɛh/, is restricted to the forests of the karstic mountain areas in Mondulkiri Province. Hunting for food or traditional medicine and superstitions as well as landmines and other ordnance left by the Cambodian Civil War are a threat to its survival.

=== Indochinese leopard ===
The Indochinese leopard has been overhunted to the point where it is "functionnally extinct" in Cambodia.

=== Long-tailed Macaque ===
In Pursat, long-tailed macaque hunting is still very common and prices have gone up with increased rarity.

== Legislation ==
The Forestry Law adopted by the Parliament of Cambodia in August 2002 stipulates in article 50 that "it is strictly prohibited to hunt, harm or harass all wildlife, including common, vulnerable and endangered species", in the following time, place and manner:

1. By use of dangerous methods;
2. During the closed season; and
3. In protected zones and special public areas.

It is even "prohibited to attempt or to commit the following activities against vulnerable and endangered wildlife species", meaning that poachers need not be caught red-handed but only being with weapons in a protected area is already a criminal offence.

== Organisations ==
Wildlife Alliance is actively fighting against illegal hunting and poaching in Cambodia. In 2023, the Alliance was ready to give $1,000 to anyone providing information on illegal hunting and trapping in protected areas.

== Bibliography ==
- Hoeur, Lay Inn (1971). La Chasse: Souvenirs de l'Est-cambodgien (in French) (3rd ed.). Phnom Penh: Réalités cambodgiennes.
- Ellul, Jean (1973). "Le traité de la chasse aux éléphants de l'Uknha Maha Pithu Krassem" (in French) in Annales de l'Université des Beaux-Arts, Phnom Penh:45-76.
- Roussel, Lucien (1913). La chasse en Indochine: Dix-neuf gravures (in French). Plon-Nourrit et cie.
- Boulangier, Edgar (1887). Un hiver au Cambodge: chasses au tigre, à l'éléphant et au buffle sauvage; souvenirs d'une mission officielle remplie en 1880-1881 (in French). A. Mame et fils.
