= Grande Inscription d'Angkor =

Coordinates: 13.412681951379485°N 103.86818915179705°E

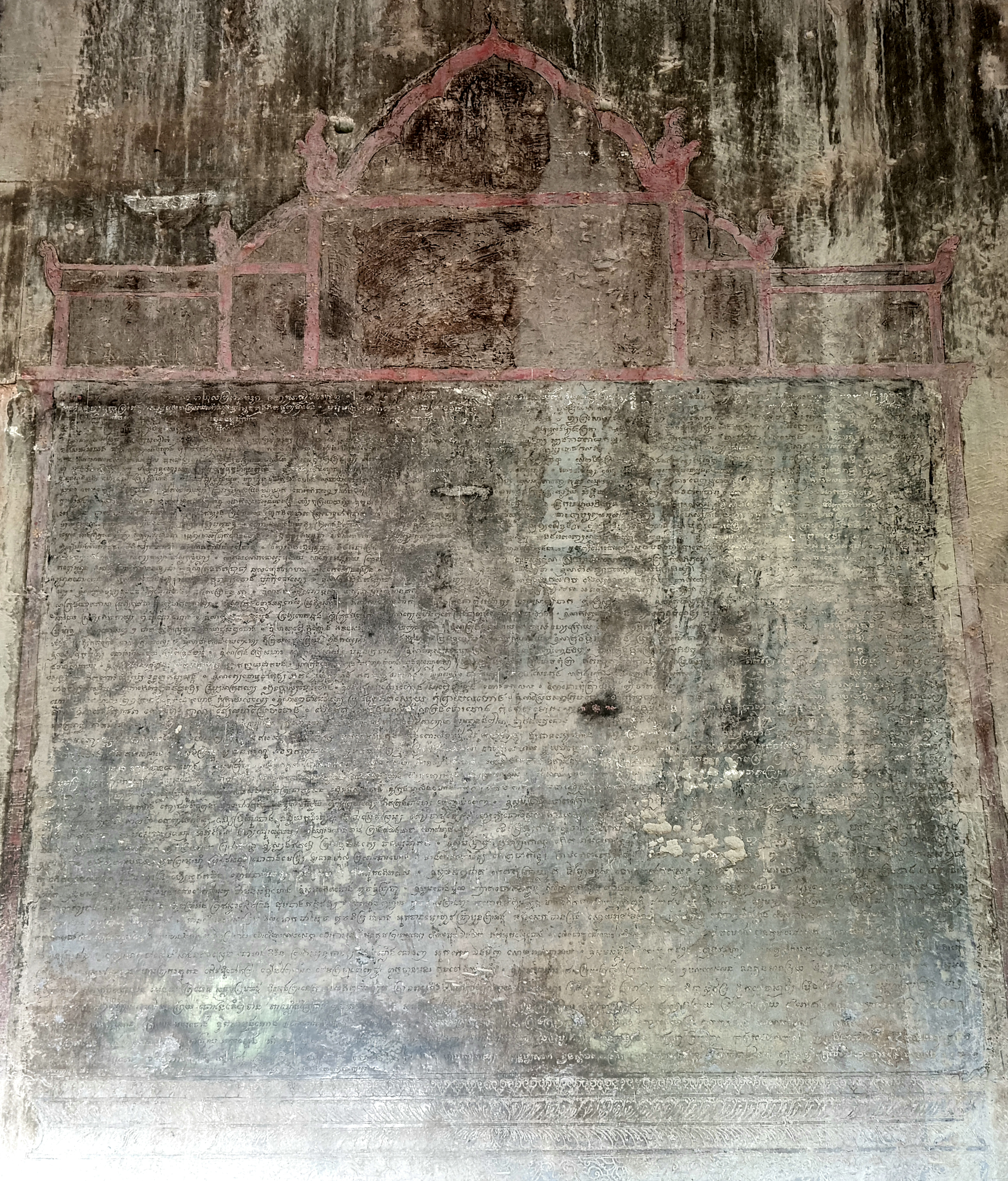
- Grande Inscription d'Angkor with its ornate frame
- Writing: Middle Khmer
- Created: ~ 18th century AD
- Place: Siem Reap, Siem Reap Province
- Present location: Angkor Wat

Location
- Grande Inscription d'Angkor (Cambodia)

The Grande Inscription d’Angkor, referenced as K. 301 or Inscription Modern Angkor Wat (IMA) #38, is the longest Khmer inscription at Angkor Wat. Dated to 1701, it is located on the east wall between the bas-relief galleries and facing the Chey Non stupa in the courtyard outside.

It is considered to be the only dated Middle Khmer metrical poem.

== Context ==
The Grande Inscription d'Angkor relates the return to Angkor of a court dignitary, a certain Oknha Jaiya Nan of Chey Non, in order to accomplish meritorious deeds. After both his two sons died on the battlefield and his wife's death left him a widower, Chey Non was deeply saddened. As a loyal father and husband, he built a laterite stupa near the entrance to the eastern gallery of Angkor Wat in honour of them. It seems impossible to determine whether or not Jaiya Nan composed the inscriptions himself or had them composed by another, perhaps a court poet. Given the unique and personal style of the texts, it seems sufficient to treat Jaiya Nan as the author, whether direct or indirect.

== Content ==
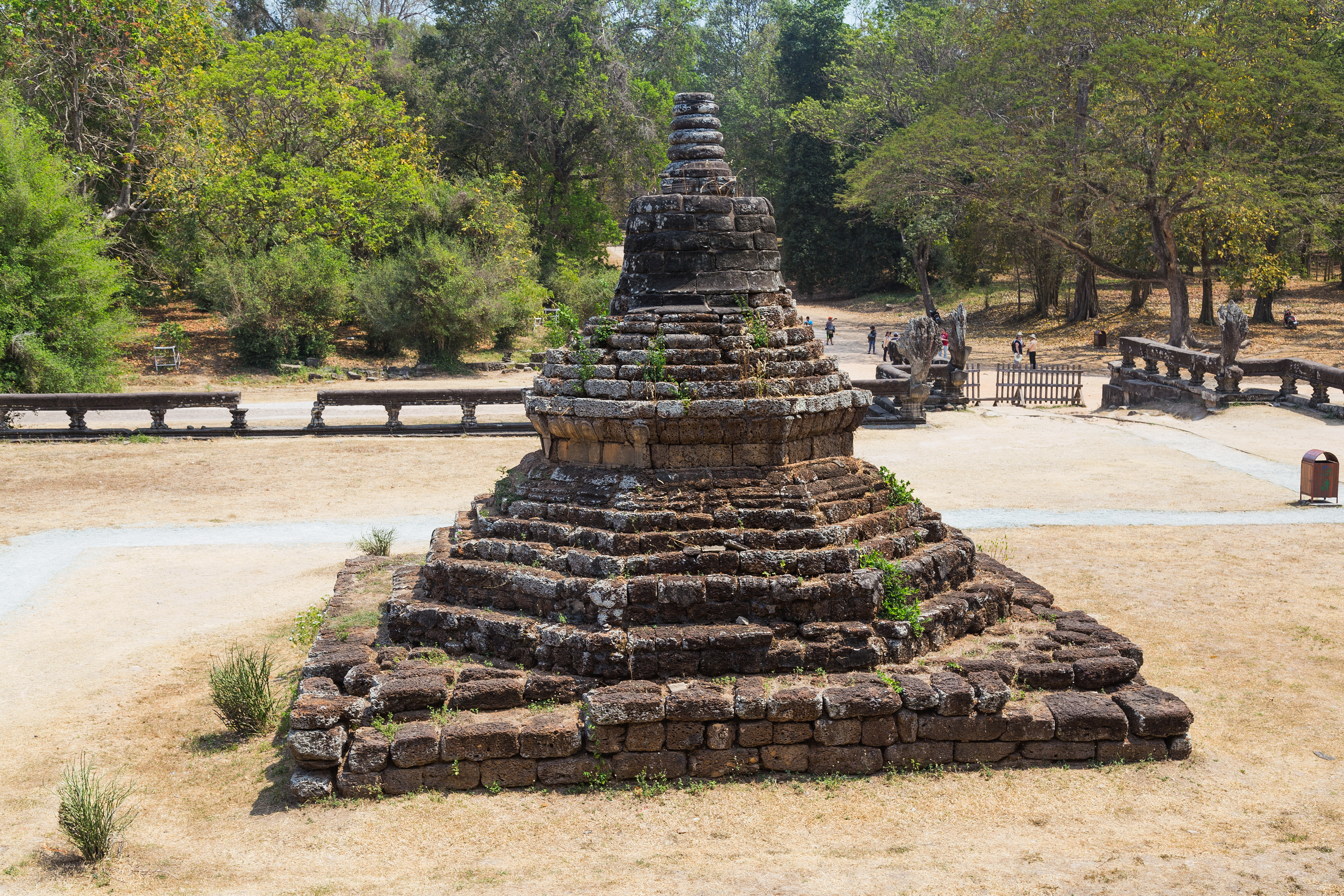
The Chey Non stupa faces the inscription on the Eastern gallery of Angkor Wat.

The Grande Inscription d'Angkor is a 53 line poem composed with 152 verses using three different meters followed by a colophon and engraved on a designated wall in the complex of Angkor Wat. Divided in three parts with "true poetic inspiration" according to Khmer historian Mak Phoeun, it is a poem rich in metaphor, literary allusion and Buddhist references. The first section is in Brahmagiti metre, and pays homage to Buddha and various divinities asking for blessings. The author details his career and laments the death of his wife for whom he built a stupa. The second part in the bhujangalila metre is apotropaic. The third part is in kakagati is devotional in hoping for a better future life. with the ultimate aim of meeting Maitreya.

The poetic meters are identical to those used in the poems attributed to King Thommo Reachea II who rule between 1627 and 1631.

== Analysis ==
=== Literary references ===
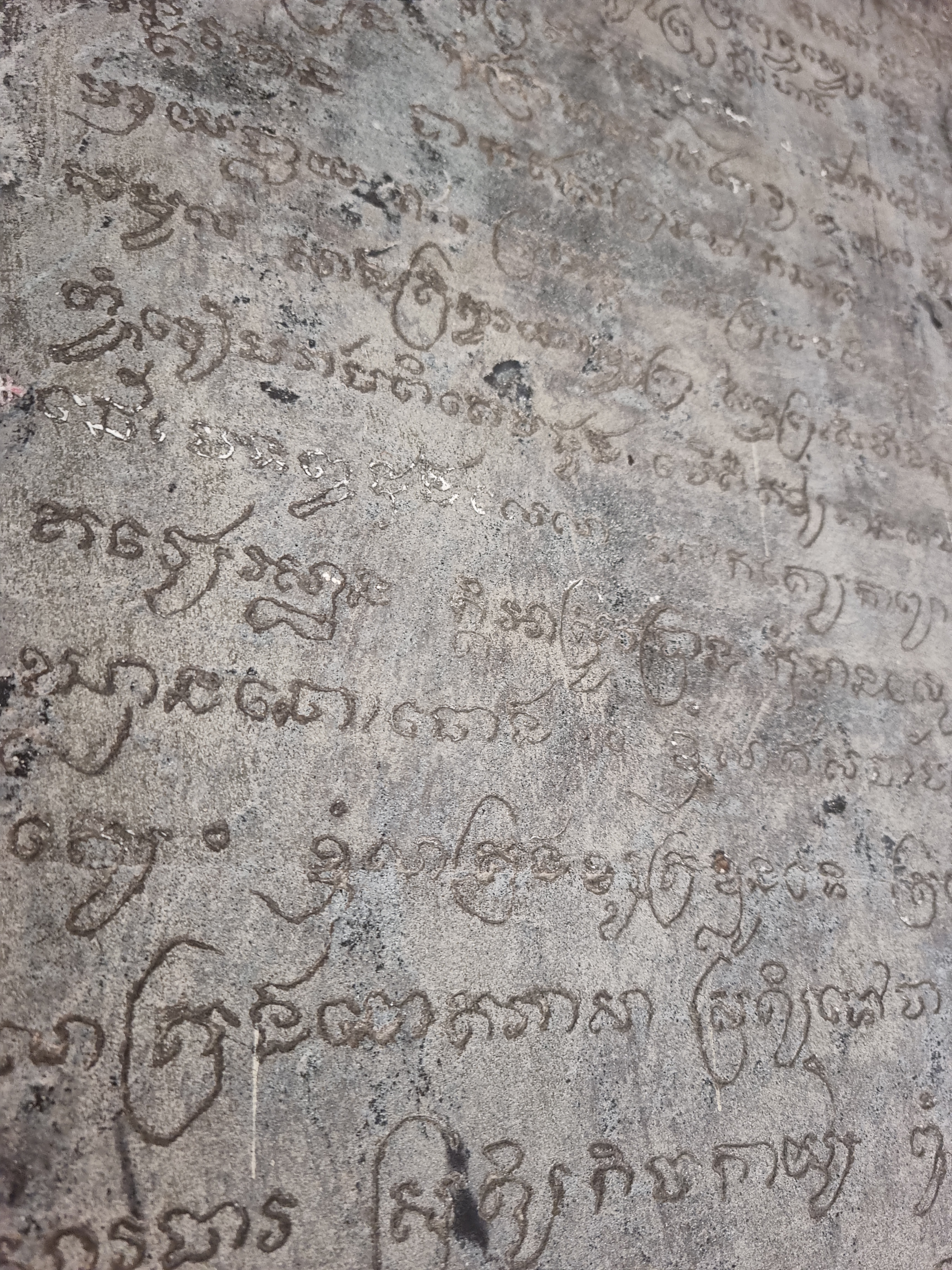
Close-up on the inscription showing the carefully carved letters in Khmer script

The poem makes literary references to various texts in Pali and traditions known to Khmer civilization: Nagasena of King Milinda of the Milinda Panha, figures of the Jataka tales both Vessantara Jātaka and Mahanipata Jataka such as Temiya, Mahosadha, Maddim Jali, Kanha. There are references to the Rama, Srivikrama, Hanuman, Dhananjaya, and Preah Ketumala, the legendary builder of royal city as mentioned in The Poem of Angkor Wat, showing that this last legend was already well ingrained in popular belief.

=== Signs of political instability ===
Ian Harris argues that the Grande Inscription d'Angkor is a witness of unstable times during which many leaders adopted an attitude of withdrawal; while King Chey Chettha III spend much of his time in robes at Wat Preah Sugandha Mean Bon in Oudong away from state affairs, the Grande Inscription d'Angkor also records that a minister, Jaiya Nan, was ordained a total of five times.

=== Continuous use of Angkor Wat despite destructions ===
The Grande Inscription d'Angkor is one of the proofs of the continuous presence of Khmer people in Angkor Wat, before the place was rediscovered by French missionary Bouillevaux and explorer Henri Mouhot. The author mentions restorations of statues. As other late inscriptions of Angkor Wat, which mention works of restoration and celebrations that took place, the author of the Grande Inscription d'Angkor Wat mentions among his meritorious acts the restoration of broken images of Buddha, broken into pieces and lost, with their neck broken the head on the ground, their feet crushed and the arms pulled out, deploring this state of decay. What's more, human remains excavated from around the Chey Non stupa indicate that the place had become an ominous place of burial for locals after the 17th century.

== Translations ==
The Grande Inscription d'Angkor was first translated by German anthropologist and published in print by Adolf Bastian in 1867. It was published in French by Etienne Aymonier in 1900 and translated into modern Khmer by Chhim Krasem first in 1938 and republished in 1984.

== Bibliography ==
- Skilling, Peter (2001). "Some Literary References in the "Grande Inscription d'Angkor" (IMA 38)". Aséanie, Sciences humaines en Asie du Sud-Est. 8 (1): 57–66. doi:10.3406/asean.2001.1731.
