= The Poem of Angkor Wat =

Khmer poem of the 17th century

The Poem of Angkor Wat (ល្បើកអង្គរវត្ត Lpoek Angkor Vat or Lbaeuk Ângkôr Vôtt), is a Khmer poem which dates from the beginning of the 17th century. It celebrates Angkor Wat, the magnificent temple complex at Angkor and describes the bas-reliefs in the temple galleries that portray the Reamker. The Poem of Angkor Wat is considered to be the earliest original literary work in Khmer language. It is one of the two great epic poems of Cambodia with the Reamker in the style of the Indian epic poetry.

== Summary ==
The Poem of Angkor Wat is the story of a certain prince Ketumala, son in a previous existence to the god Indra, who cannot stay in the gods' realm because his human smell is unbearable to the devata. Out of compassion for his exiled son, Indra sends his personal architect, Preah Pisnukar (or Braḥ Bisṇukār, Vishvakarman) to the earth to build a palace for Ketumala in the human realm.

Preah Pisnukar supervises and organizes servants from all over the world to build the palace. Preah Pisnukar orders the clearing of the forest around Phnom Bakheng, and the bringing of high quality stones to construct the complex. Once the works are completed, Preah Ketmealea enters his new palace namely Intapras, where he rules as the great king (Mahārāja, or Mohareach).

== Analysis ==
=== Versions ===
The version of The Poem of Angkor Wat was originally inscribed on the temples of Angkor Wat and was first written in modern script in 1878 by the French Khmerologist Étienne Aymonier as "Edification d'Angkor Vat ou Satra de Prea Kêt Mealéa" (sic). Later in 2009, Sokha Thoum, Horm Chhayly, and Hay Vanneth reorganized into modern, easier-to-read scripts, including a glossary for interpreting the ancient words used in the poem.

=== Date and authorship ===
According to khmerologist Grégory Mikaelian, The Poem of Angkor Wat is a cosmogonic text of a new literary genre wanted by the royal government of Oudong engaged in a cycle of refoundation of power following the fall of their capital Longvek conquered by the Siamese in 1594.

Variously dated 1598 and 1620, a philological study of The Poem of Angkor Wat by Pou Saveros has established its date of composition as 1620 AD and attributed its authorship to a certain Pang Tat, called Neak Pang.

=== Style ===
The Khmer poem is rich in alliterative and rhyming words. The poem is long and uses three different meters: Bat Prohmkoet, Bat Kakketi, and Bat Pomnol. According to Pou Saveros, much of it defies any intelligence, which contrasts with the clarity of Khmer inscription IMA 38 known as the "great inscription of Angkor".

=== Shifting memories ===
The Poem of Angkor Wat is a witness to the cultural shift of Cambodia after the fall of Longvek and reflects the "harmonization of [the] Brahmanic heritage and Theravada ideology."

One of the main characters, Ketumala, corresponds to King Suryavarman II, in the first half of the twelfth century, the real builder of Angkor Wat, but at the time of composition the poem in the seventeenth century, Suryavarman II had already vanished from people's minds.

== Influence ==
=== An archeological trace in Khmer literature: celebrating the beauty of Angkor Wat ===
The Story of Angkor Wat which dates from the beginning of the 17th century, celebrates the magnificent temple complex at Angkor and describes the bas-reliefs in the temple galleries that portray the Rāma story. The epic eulogizes the glory of Cambodian rulers and celebrates the beauty of their palace, Angkor Wat.

Preah Pisnukar, main hero of the poem, is still invoked as a patron by carpenters, artists and builders in Cambodia as the legendary builder of Angkor Wat. He has also been invoked by alien theorists.

=== A landmark of Khmer literature ===
The Poem of Angkor has had a lasting influence on Khmer culture and literature.

Etiologically, the main characters of the poem have also given their name to the geography of Siemreap: the name Ketmealea is the basis for the name of the monument Beng Mealea, the modern Buddhist pagoda Wat Beng Mealea, and the village and commune Phum Beng Mealea, which is located in the Svay Leu district, Siem Reap province. It was also chosen for the name of the Preah Ket Mealea Hospital in Phnom Penh.

To this day, The Poem of Angkor is often referred to by Khmer people, in popular plays and pastiche, as well as in the Royal Ballet of Cambodia.

=== A masterpiece of poetry ===
The Poem of Angkor Wat reveals the poetic potential of the ruins of Angkor Wat. This poetic potential was reflected in the works by generations of bards and poets, both Khmer and foreign, such as American poet Allen Ginsberg's "Ankor Wat", one of the most significant evocations of the Khmer temples in modern literature.

The legend of Angkor illustrates popular creations composed from elements belonging to several different traditions, an Indian Hindu tradition and a Southeast Asian Buddhist tradition. According to Saveros Pou, the talent of the poets did the rest, rooting the legend in the heart of the Khmer people: it borders on genius.

== Bibliography ==
- Sotheavin, Nhim (2019–2022). "A commentary on Lboek Angkor Vat". Renaissance Culturelle du Cambodge. 31: 107–143.
