= Chhim Krasem =

Khmer (Cambodia) historian

- Born: ទេពពិទូរ ឈឹម ក្រសេម
- Other name: Maha Pithu Krasem
- Occupation: Historian
- Organization(s): National Library of Cambodia; Buddhist Institute

Chhim Krasem or Krassem was a member of the Khmer intelligentsia during the first half of the 20th century during the period of transition from the French protectorate to the independent Kingdom of Cambodia.

== Biography ==
Chhim Krasem was born in Cambodia at an uncertain date around the 1870s. He received a Buddhist education during which he learned both Thai and the Pali language.

Krasem worked toward the foundation of two Cambodian cultural preservation institutions, the National Library of Cambodia established in 1925, and the Buddhist Institute established in 1930. He fulfilled specific missions for the collection, reproduction, and preservation of religious documents.

In 1929, Krasem translated into Khmer the manual of buddhist iconography written in Siamese by Thai Prince Damrong Rajanubhab. Apart from the translation of the Thai text, Krasem re-translated the Hitopadesha or the compilation of the Indian fables from the French translation.

Advised by George Cœdès, director of the French School of the Far East, Krasem, on behalf of the Buddhist Institute, published the Angkorian inscriptions listed and translated by Aymonier in Khmer language, including the Grande Inscription d'Angkor, and was praised for the excellence of his scholarship.

As part of his research work at the Buddhist Institute, he also wrote, translated and edited a number of research articles published in the journal Kambujasuriyā (founded in 1926). In the early 1930s, the latter periodical serialized a lengthy historical treatise on Buddhism, Sāsanā Pravatti [History of the Religion], written by Khmer monk and intellectual Mahā Bidūr Krasem, who explained that his aim in writing the history was to show ancient India as a "meeting place of various religious ideologies as well as to explicate the "history of Kampuchea very clearly."

In 1936, he published a glossary of the ancient Khmer language to accompany a new edition of the classic Reamker.

In 1939, Krasem translated original documents in Pali and compiled a book on the tree of illumination, also known as the Bodhi tree.

In 1947, he became a member of the Cultural Committee of Cambodia, which contributed to the modernization of the Khmer language and the production of the new Khmer dictionary of Chuon Nath.

Chhim Krasem was Managing Director of the Pali School from 1950 to 1951.

Chhim Krasem died at an uncertain date in the 1950s.

== Influence on Cambodian historiography: between tradition and renewal ==
=== Anti-modern modern ===
Krasem is considered an "anti-modern modern", a transitional figure between the world of traditional scholars and European knowledge, like others Khmer intellectuals of this period as Au Chiieng who sought to be imbued, up to a certain point, by French modernity in order better to safeguard the Cambodian palace culture. His research, which learned from modern forms of survey and academic synthesis, safeguarded traditions which were being lost, such as elephant hunting in Cambodia.

=== Historical quest of the Indian origins of Khmer buddhism ===
In a movement similar to the critical quest for the historical Jesus in the West, Krasem proceeded to a historical quest for the Indian origins of Khmer buddhism. Krasem asserted that it was essential for Cambodians to "perceive the direct line of transmission between ancient Buddhists and contemporary Khmer Buddhism in order to understand their own history". Kambujasuriyā articles from this period featured photos or translations into Khmer about visits to Buddhist sites in India as well as Indological essays such as Georges Bonneau's "The Manner in Which the Buddha was Worshiped in India."

=== Acknowledging the influence of Siam on Khmer culture ===
Krasem's contributions on the history of Khmer dance in the Kambujasuriyā reveals an idea of Khmer tradition different from that exposed by Thiounn who had been more influenced by French discourse in 1930 which tended to exalt Angkor. According to Japanese khmerlogist Sasagawa, "it must have been obvious for those who understood the Thai language that the Cambodian dance had a relationship not with Angkor but with Siam, and that was the reason why Krasem found some significance in translating the Thai text and contributing it to the Kambujasuriyā".

== Bibliography ==
- Thun, Theara (2020). "The epistemological shift from palace chronicles to scholarly Khmer historiography under French colonial rule". Journal of Southeast Asian Studies. 51 (1–2): 132–153. doi:10.1017/S0022463420000235. ISSN 0022-4634. S2CID 225827319.
