= Lum Choar =

Commune in Ou Ya Dav District, Ratanakiri Province, Cambodia

Lum Choar លំជ័រ
- Commune
- Location within Cambodia
- Coordinates: 13°41′55″N 107°18′58″E
- Country: Cambodia
- Province: Ratanakiri Province
- District: Ou Ya Dav District
- Villages: 4

Population (1998)
  - Total: 1,385
- Time zone: UTC+07
- Geocode: 160702

Lum Choar (Khmer: លំជ័រ) is a commune in Ou Ya Dav District, Ratanakiri Province, Cambodia. It contains four villages and has a population of 1,385. In the 2007 commune council elections, three of the commune's five seats went to the Cambodian People's Party and two went to the Sam Rainsy Party. The land alienation rates in Lum Choar was moderate as of January 2006. (See Ratanakiri Province for background information on land alienation.)

Village	Population (1998)	Sex ratio (male/female) (1998)	Number of households (1998)	Notes
Lai	315	1.14	65	
Ka Te	312	1.04	48	
Trang	123	1.08	21	
Un	635	1.08	124	
