= Ya Tung =

Ya Tung យ៉ាទុង
- Commune
- Location within Cambodia
- Coordinates: 13°41′N 107°25′E
- Country: Cambodia
- Province: Ratanakiri
- District: Ou Ya Dav District
- Villages: 5

Population
  - Total: 1,751
- Time zone: UTC+07
- Geocode: 160707

យ៉ា នីន Tung (Khmer: យ៉ាទុង) is a commune in Ou Ya Dav Distយ៉ា នីន

rict in northeast Cambodia. It contains five villages and has a population of 1,751. In the 2007 commune council elections, four of the commune's five seats went to the Cambodian People's Party and one went to the Sam Rainsy Party. The land alienation rates in Ya Tung was moderate as of January 2006. (See Ratanakiri Province for background information on land alienation.)

== Villages ==
Village	Population (1998)	Sex ratio (male/female) (1998)	Number of households (1998)	Notes
Ten Ngol	532	0.91	109	
Peak	445	0.9	66	
TenSoh	196	0.83	39	
Dar	340	1.06	50	
Sam	238	0.95	39	
