= Sesan Commune =

Sesan ឃុំសេសាន
- Commune
- Location within Cambodia
- Coordinates: 13°46′08″N 107°25′45″E
- Country: Cambodia
- Province: Ratanakiri Province
- District: Ou Ya Dav District
- Villages: 3

Population (1998)
  - Total: 921
- Time zone: UTC+07
- Geocode: 160705

Sesan (Khmer: ឃុំសេសាន) is a commune in Ou Ya Dav District in northeast Cambodia. It contains three villages and has a population of 921. In the 2007 commune council elections, all five seats went to members of the Cambodian People's Party. The land alienation rates in Sesan was moderate as of January 2006. (See Ratanakiri Province for background information on land alienation.)

Village	Population (1998)	Sex ratio (male/female) (1998)	Number of households (1998)	Notes
Pa Tang	187	1.01	25	
Phi	361	0.94	66	
Pa Dal	373	0.89	57	
