= Khmer inscriptions =

Corpus of historical carved writings of Khmer origin

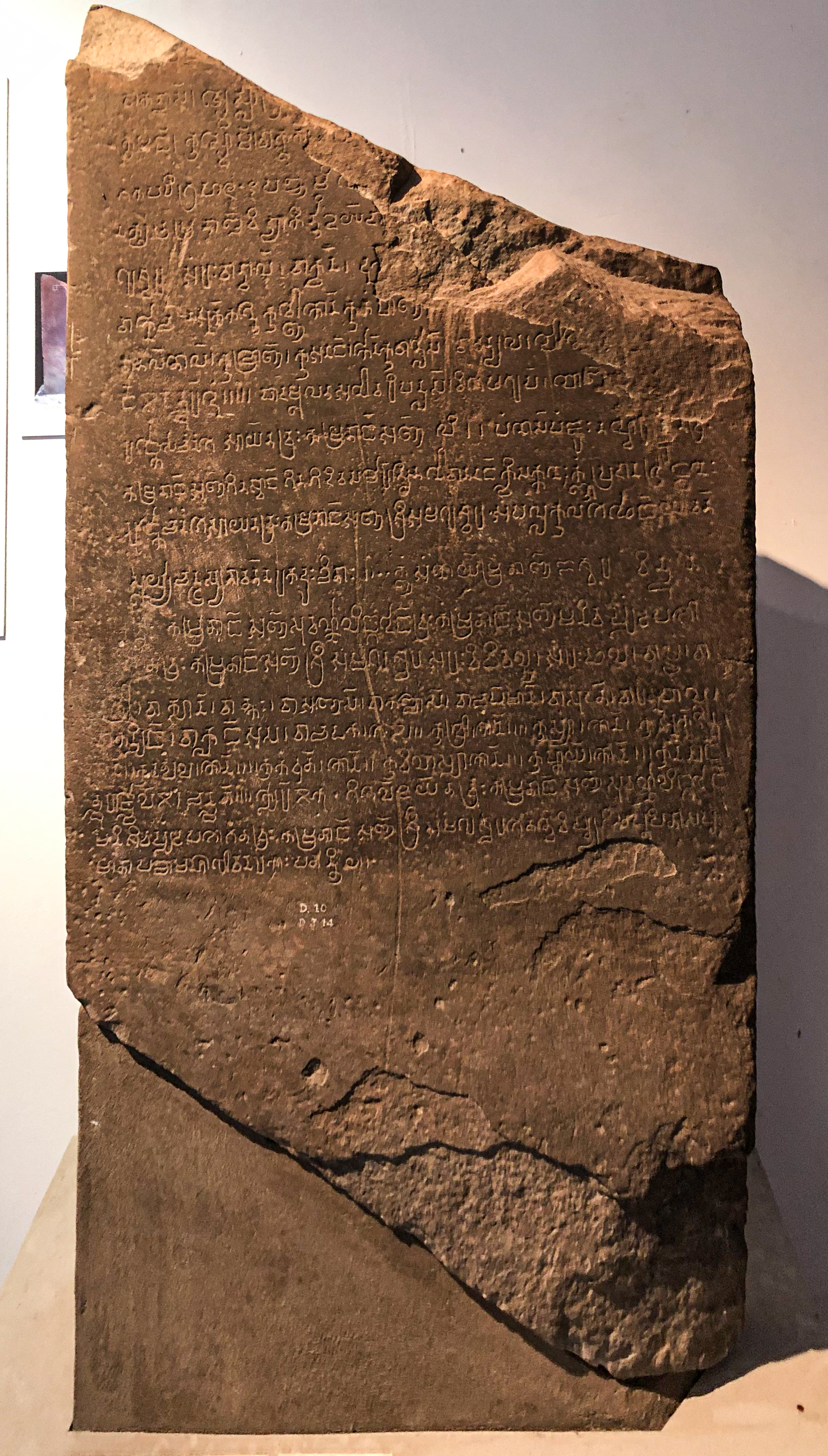
The Sambor Inscription, containing the oldest, firmly dated use of "0" as a decimal figure. The date "605 Saka era" (683 CE) is written in Khmer numerals, referring to the year it was made. Found in Kratié province, Cambodia

Khmer inscriptions are a corpus of post-5th century historical texts engraved on materials such as stone and metal ware found in a wide range of mainland Southeast Asia (Cambodia, Vietnam, Thailand and Laos) and relating to the Khmer civilization. The study of Khmer inscriptions is known as Khmer epigraphy.

Khmer inscriptions are the only local written sources for the study of ancient Khmer civilization.

More than 1,200 Khmer inscriptions of varying length have been collected. There was an 'explosion' of Khmer epigraphy from the seventh century, with the earliest recorded Khmer stone inscription dating from 612 AD at Angkor Borei.

Beyond their archeological significance, Khmer inscriptions have become a marker of national identity.

== Language: Sanskrit, old Khmer, and rarely Pali ==
The languages used on Khmer inscriptions are either ancient Khmer or sanskrit while a few have also been found in pali, though the latter are no older than the 14th century. The oldest inscription in Sanskrit is from the 5th century and the oldest one in ancient Khmer is from the 7th century. Apart from the stele of Phimanakas, there are no bilingual steles in Cambodia properly speaking; the part in ancient Khmer does not translate but sometimes paraphrases the narrative part in Sanskrit with more material and technical details.

=== Inscriptions in Sanskrit ===
Sanskrit inscriptions, from the 5th to the 14th century, are found all over Cambodia, and they are proof of the flourishing state of Sanskrit learning. These inscriptions exhibit the knowledge of different metres and the most developed poetic rules and conventions of rhetoric and prosody. Khmer inscriptions are more philosophical than the mangala of Indian inscriptions. Their language and grammar is also more correct than most Indian inscriptions.

Khmer Inscription K-127: the significance of this inscription made in AD 683, is that it indicates that at present knowledge, the first zero is an ancient Khmer invention, while the first known use of a numerical zero in India was dated to the mid-ninth century, an era that coincided with the Arab Caliphate.

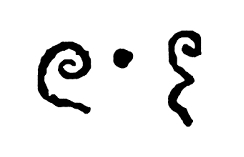

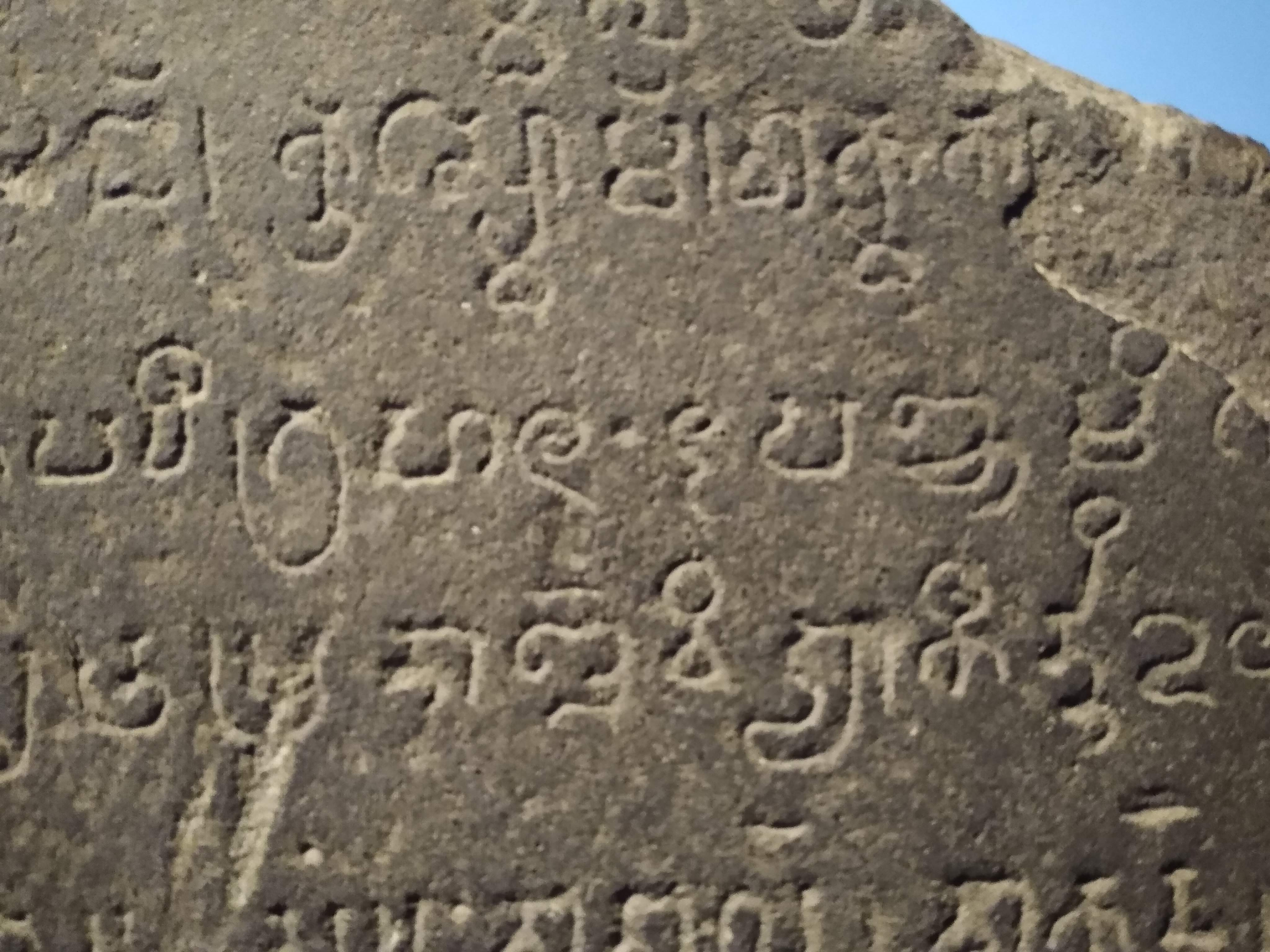

The number of such inscriptions written in ornate kavya style is larger than in any other country in Southeast Asia. Khmer inscriptions in Sanskrit make use of the Shaka era and the decimal system in numbers first noticed in the 7th century, including the number 0.

Sanskrit is used in Khmer inscriptions as the language of the gods, especially for poems and prayers offered in their honour. Their structure is fixed: after an introductory invocation of the divinity, comes the praise of the founder or benefactor of the sanctuary before ending with imprecatory verses aimed at anyone who would not protect the premises of the temple and wishing them the chastisement of hell.

Useful archeological information is most often found in the central part, which often reveals the name of the ruling king, and the dates of his reign.

=== Inscriptions in ancient Khmer ===
Ancient Khmer first appears on inscriptions at the end of the 7th century. Khmer inscriptions written in ancient Khmer are most often in prose and are usually a more or less detailed inventory of the offerings received by a sanctuary. These inscriptions, such as the Grande Inscription d'Angkor, reveal precious information about the culture of Cambodia. Their content has also been found at least in one instance to match that of the Royal Chronicles of Cambodia.

It is believed that the population expressed some sort of resistance with regard to the Sanskrit language, which necessitated the use of indigenous language to make known the royal orders and the charters which affected the life of the autochthonous populations.

Khmer inscriptions use an alphabet stemming from Southern India. This early alphabet evolved into the modern form of Khmer script. At the end of the 9th century, King Yasovarman I attempted to introduce a new form of script probably from Northern India, but this attempt did not last beyond his own reign.

=== Inscriptions in Pali ===
Pali epigraphy in Khmer provinces is extremely scarce; only a dozen Pali inscriptions have been found, engraved in a span of twelve centuries.

There is no trace of Pali texts proper in ancient Cambodian epigraphy, except epigraphs consisting of the formula: Ye dhamma. The presence of Pali in Khmer epigraphy effectively replaced that of Sanskrit from the 14th century onwards and it was regarded as a sacred language.

== Literary genre ==
Khmer inscriptions attest to the existence of every type of ancient literature - scientific, historical, epic and especially religious.

=== Religion ===
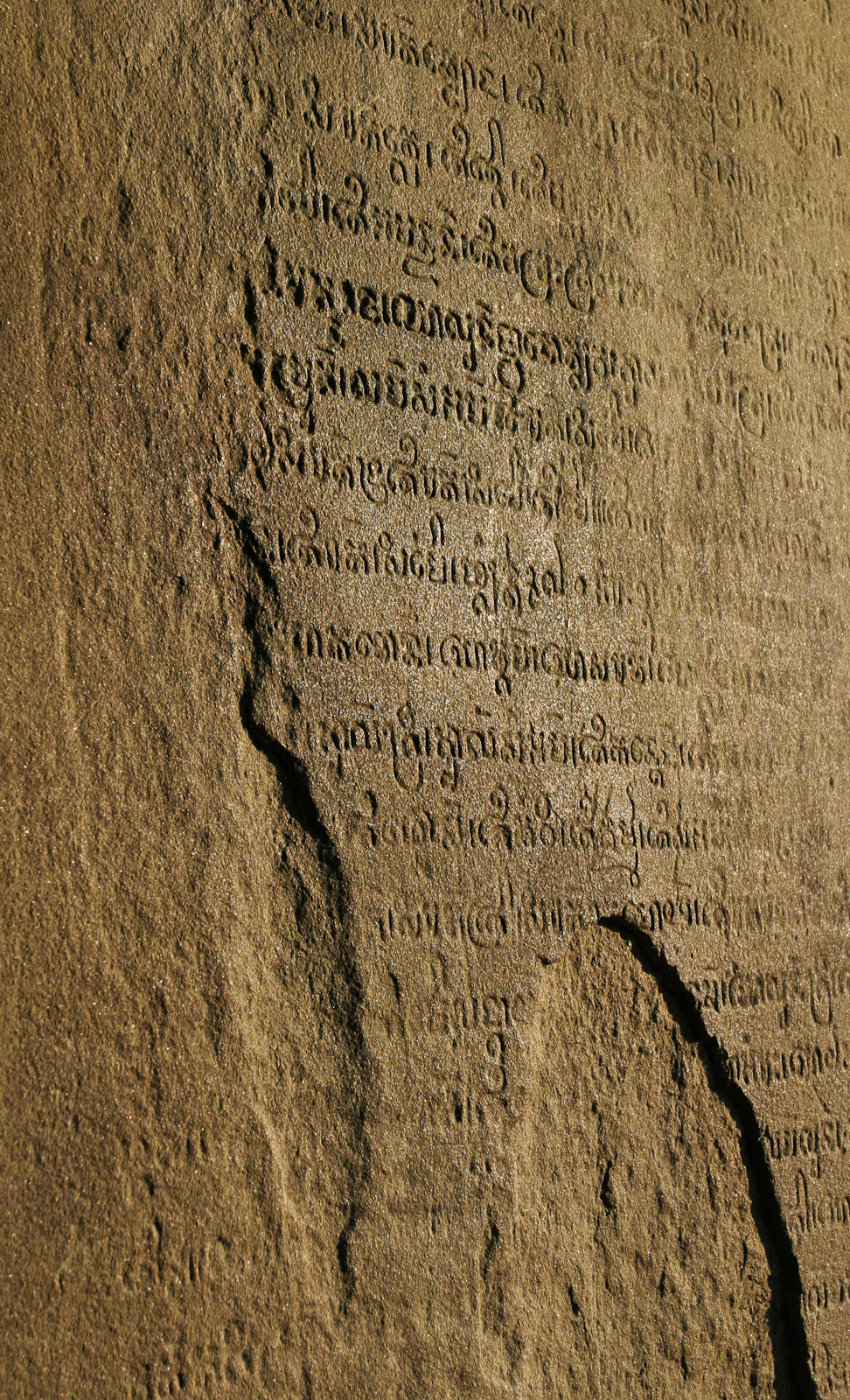
Prasat Kraven - Doorway Inscriptions

The Khmer inscriptions written in Sanskrit are often religious invocations which reveal the influence of philosophical and theological conceptions rooted in Indian texts such as the Upanishad, the Purana and the Agama for Vaisnavism and Shaivism.

Cambodian epigraphy provides a comparatively large and early documentation on Pancharatra and more specifically of its "five timely observances", as well as indications of syncretistic Vaisnavism which would be peculiar to ancient Cambodia.

Khmer inscriptions are indicative of the prompt movement of religious idea across the Indian Ocean. One example is that the Indian philosopher Adi Shankara, who died about 750 AD, is mentioned in a 9th-century Cambodian inscription.

Khmer inscriptions in Pali language, however, refer to Buddhist corpus.

=== Legislation ===
Khmer epigraphy records the use of a state court system to maintain land borders and to settle land disputes.

=== Economy ===
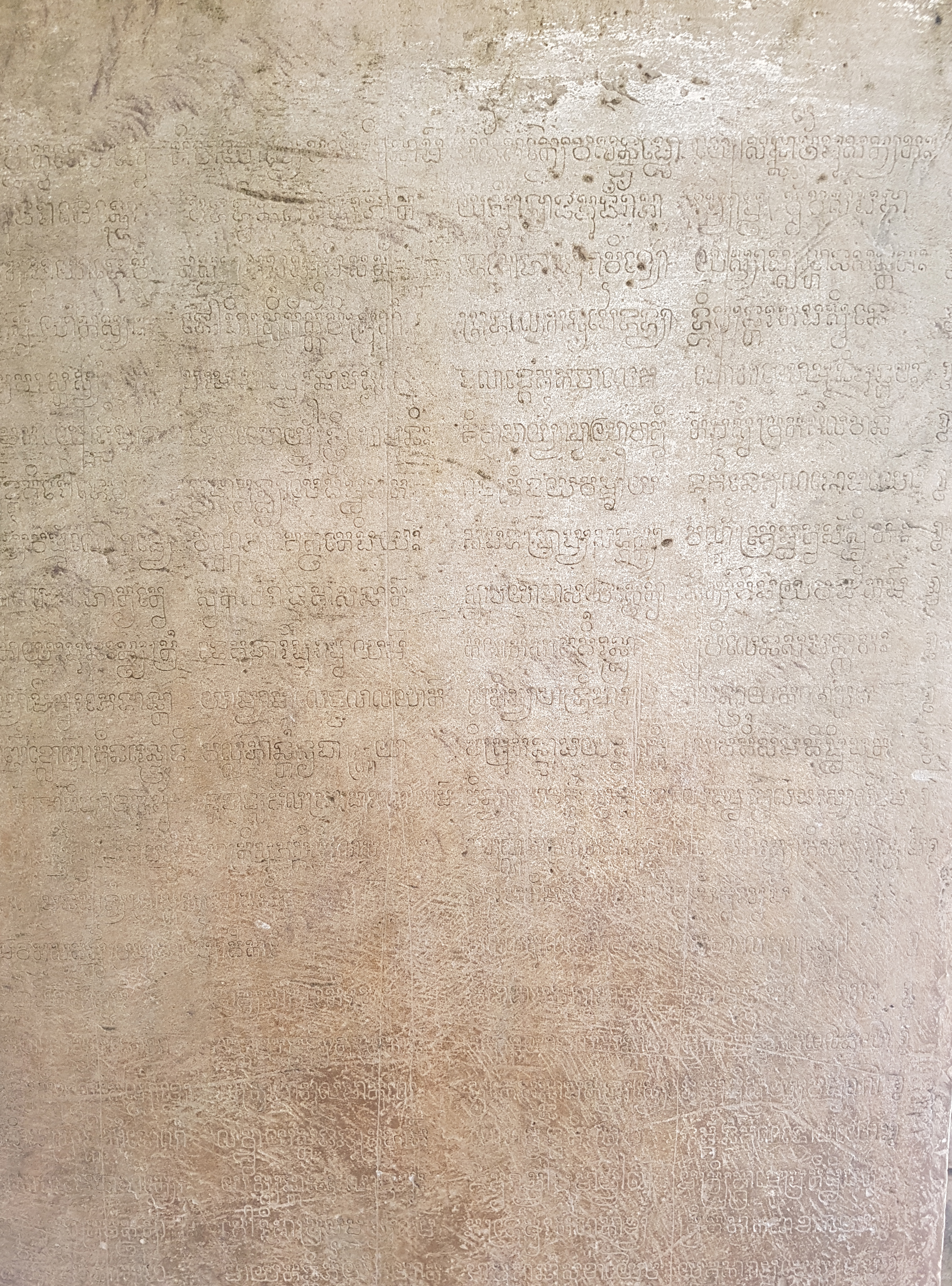
Markets and marketing in Angkor are first mentioned at the end of the 12th century in the Ta Prohm inscription of Jayavarman VII.

Unfortunately, the Khmer epigraphy does not provide sufficient documentation for a definitive view of a hierarchical Khmer marketing network, but only clues. Khmer epigraphy is never explicit about issues of money and markets. Instead of reflecting a transaction system adapted to a complex society, the Angkorian period inscriptions show less concern with monetary values than before. Markets and marketing in Angkor are first mentioned at the end of the 12th century in the Ta Prohm inscription of Jayavarman VII. Khmer inscriptions confirm that the Khmer empire did not use a centralized monopole currency but rather commodity settlements and various available foreign currencies, and that its economy could be described as a catallaxy based on exchange, as evidenced by the Wat Baset inscription.

=== Sociology ===
We know that only brahmins, kshatriyas, and servants are mentioned in ancient Khmer epigraphy, which can be linked to the idea that caste in India was used rather more flexibly in Ancient Cambodia.

=== Medical treatise ===
The Khmer epigraphy has preserved some significant evidences which directly mention medical science.

=== Music and Dance ===
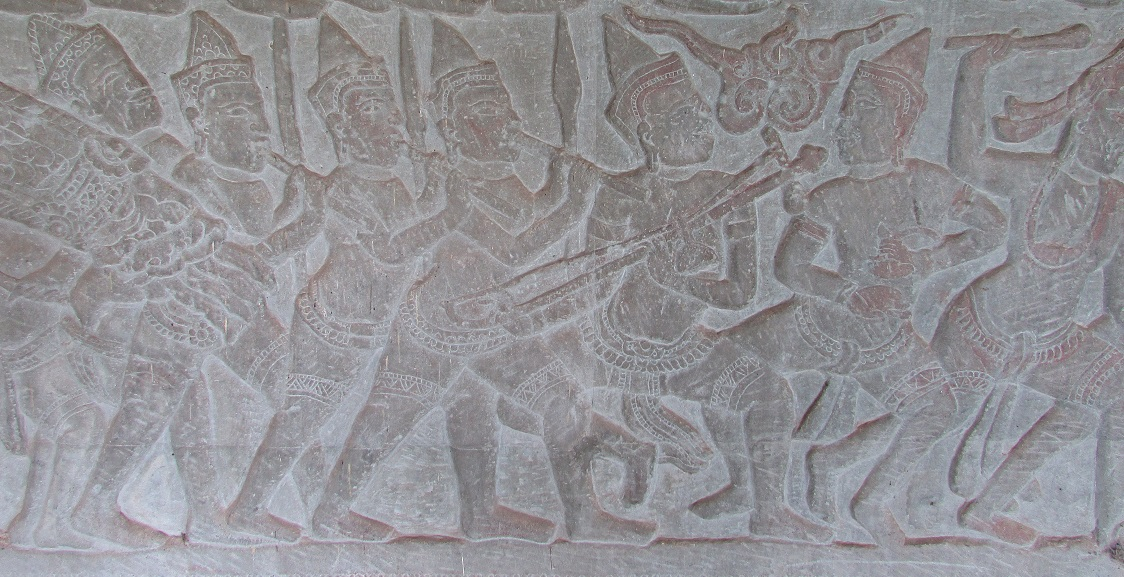
Ancient Khmer military band as depicted on the walls of Angkor Wat.

In Khmer epigraphy, there is no such text as dealing with art according to Pou Saveros. Information about music and dance found therein is of an incidental nature. Among the many rites and offerings, many artists, dancers, musicians, and singers, are to mentioned to serve the gods in daily worship.

== Historiography ==
The study of Indo-Cambodian epigraphy began in 1879 with the decipherment of some Sanskrit records by H. Kern from the estampages prepared by Jules Harmand.

The publication of Khmer inscriptions kicked off with the foundational work of Bart and Bergaigne who published their classic Inscriptions sanscrites de Campa et du Cambodge from 1885 to 1893 with the help of Étienne Aymonier, who laid the foundations of Khmer epigraphy in his book Cambodge (1901–1904).

Their work was enriched by the work of George Cœdès from 1937 to 1954, whose goal was collate the known data about Khmer epigraphy.

Since the death of the latter in 1969, epigraphist Kamaleswar Bhattacharya has claimed that "not a single scholar has turned up who can read both Sanskrit and Khmer".

Others such as Matsuura Fumiaki reject the claim that the field of Khmer epigraphy is moribund since the 1960s quoting the works of scholars such as Michael Vickery, and his study on the pre-Angkorian corpus, and Philp Jenner, and his study in collaboration with Vong Sotheara, as well as Gerdi Gerschheimer leading the project of the Corpus des Inscriptions khmeres.

Khmer epigraphy began to be taught as a subject at the Royal University of Phnom Penh even before the Khmer Rouge Regime. It was taught to sophomore students who pursued a degree in history, Khmer literature and linguistics. Today, the teachings have spread to many other universities including the private academic institutions. Ang Choulean's 2013 textbook on the old Khmer inscriptions was the first authentic textbook written in Khmer while Sotheara has also conducted studies of Khmer epigraphy using Khmer language.

== Bibliography ==
- Jacques, Claude (2002-05-01). "Khmer Epigraphy". Museum International. 54 (1–2): 37–43. doi:10.1111/1468-0033.00362. ISSN 1350-0775. S2CID 218510207.
- អាំង, ជូលាន (2013). មូលដ្ឋានរៀនខ្មែរបុរាណ (in Khmer). Ysʹodhr. ISBN 978-99963-818-0-5.\
