= Try Pheap =

Cambodian businessman

- Other names: Oknha Try Pheap
- Occupation: Businessman
- Known for: Designated by the United States under Executive Order 13818 (Global Magnitsky sanctions) (2019)

Try Pheap (also known as Oknha Try Pheap) is a Cambodian businessman associated with the Try Pheap Group and related Cambodia-based companies. In December 2019, the United States Department of the Treasury's Office of Foreign Assets Control (OFAC) designated him under Executive Order 13818 (Global Magnitsky sanctions), alleging corruption connected to Cambodia's natural-resources sector and timber trafficking. Cambodia's Ministry of Foreign Affairs criticised the U.S. action and described the allegations as groundless.

Try Pheap has also been a prominent figure in controversy over Cambodia's timber sector. Global Witness and other organizations have alleged that politically connected business networks have benefited from illegal logging and cross-border timber trafficking, including the export of high-value timber to regional markets.

In September 2025, OFAC sanctioned Cambodia-based M.D.S. Heng He Co., Ltd., describing it as chaired by Try Pheap and linking it to transnational crime and cyber scams; the U.S. announcement referenced his 2019 designation.

== Business activities ==
In its 2019 designation, the U.S. Treasury stated that Try Pheap owned or controlled multiple Cambodia-based companies and alleged that his business activity was connected to Cambodia's natural-resources economy and the timber sector.

Cambodian business reporting has also described diversification by companies linked to Try Pheap, including expansion into fuel distribution.

== Timber sector and illegal-logging allegations ==
A 2015 report by Global Witness described Cambodia's illegal trade in precious timber and alleged that influential networks were involved in the extraction and cross-border movement of high-value wood products. A later Global Witness statement responding to the 2019 U.S. sanctions linked the designation to long-running allegations concerning illegal logging and timber trafficking in Cambodia.

In 2018, a group of NGOs raised concerns about the risk that illegally sourced timber could enter supply chains in the context of policy discussions around the EU–Vietnam timber agreement; the coverage cited NGO allegations about Cambodian timber flows and governance problems in the sector.

A report by the Global Initiative Against Transnational Organized Crime discussed Cambodia's illegal logging economy and described how illicit timber supply chains can intersect with corruption, patronage and cross-border trade routes.

== Sanctions ==
=== 2019 Global Magnitsky designation ===
On 9 December 2019, OFAC designated Try Pheap under Executive Order 13818 (Global Magnitsky sanctions), alleging corruption connected to Cambodia's natural-resources sector. The U.S. Treasury announcement also designated entities described as owned or controlled by him.

The U.S. Treasury announcement listed the following entities as owned or controlled by Try Pheap:

- Try Pheap Import Export Co., Ltd.
- MDS Import Export Co., Ltd.
- Santipheap Import Export Co., Ltd.
- Try Pheap Forestry Development Co., Ltd.

Cambodian officials criticised the sanctions action and characterised the allegations as groundless.

=== 2025 U.S. action linked to cyber scams ===
On 8 September 2025, the U.S. Treasury sanctioned M.D.S. Heng He Co., Ltd., stating that it was chaired by Try Pheap and describing it as developing a large compound project in Pursat province that the U.S. Treasury said would include on-site accommodation and facilities used to conduct online schemes; the U.S. Treasury statement referenced Try Pheap's 2019 designation under Executive Order 13818.

== See also ==
- Environmental issues in Cambodia
- Deforestation in Cambodia
- Corruption in Cambodia
- Global Magnitsky Human Rights Accountability Act
