= Deforestation in Cambodia =

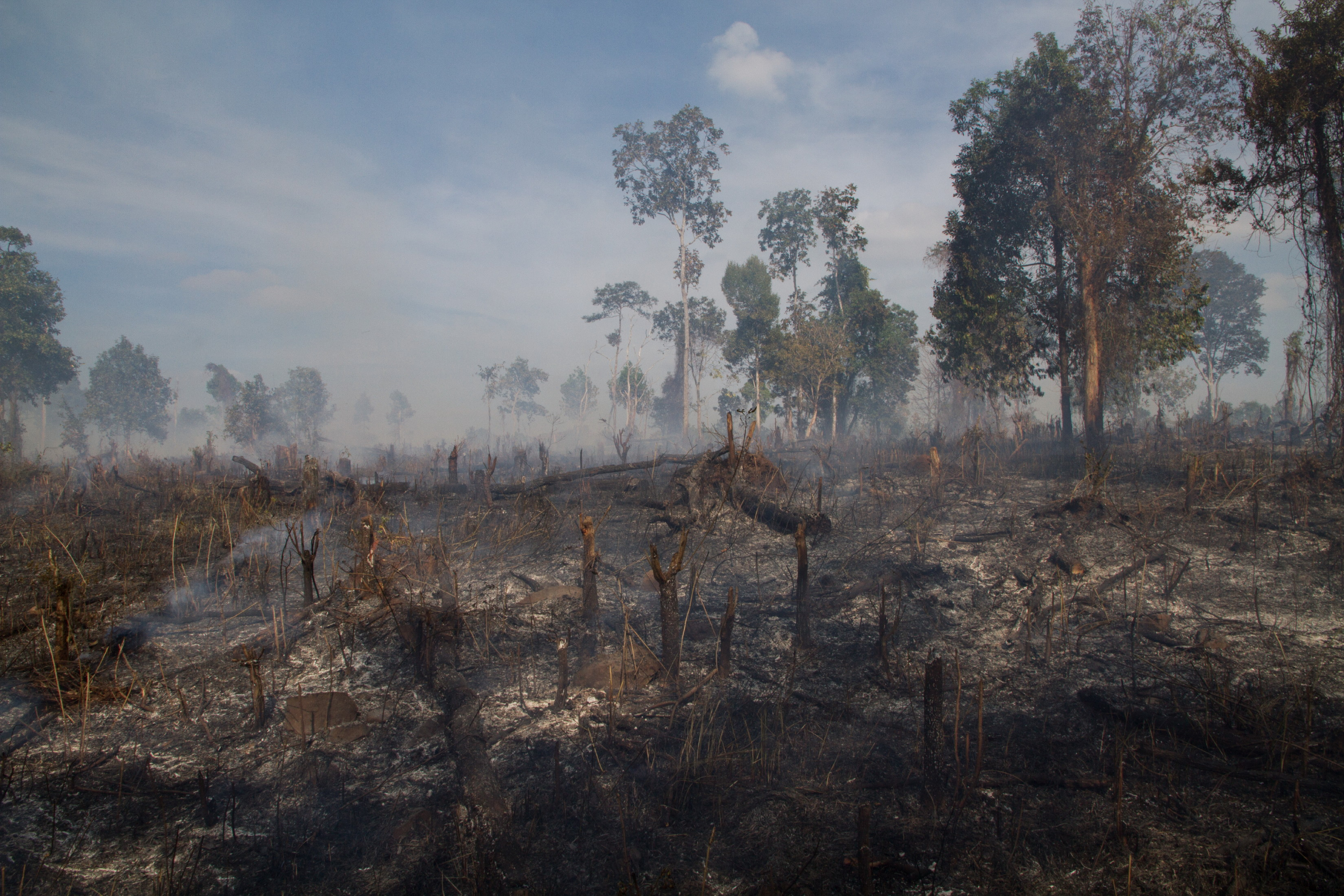
Illegal deforestation near Saen Monourom, Mondulkiri Province, Cambodia

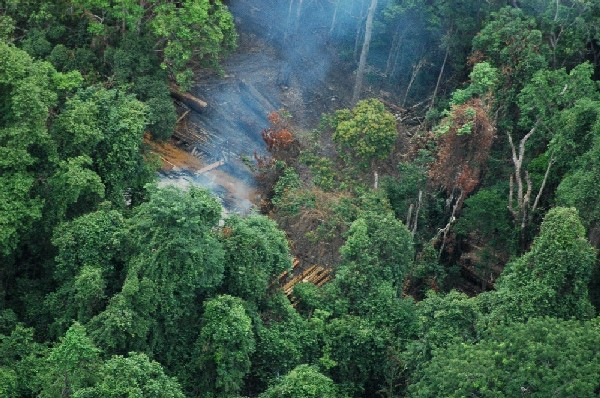
An illegal logging camp in the Cardamom Mountains in Koh Kong Province, Cambodia

Deforestation in Cambodia has increased in recent years. Cambodia is one of the world's most forest endowed countries, that was not historically widely deforested. However, massive deforestation for economic development threatens its forests and ecosystems. As of 2015, the country has one of the highest rates of deforestation in the world.

Deforestation has directly resulted from poorly managed commercial logging, fuel wood collection, agricultural invasion, and infrastructure and urban development. Indirect pressures include rapid population growth, inequalities in land tenure, lack of agriculture technology, and limited employment opportunities.

The Cambodian government has played a large role in shaping the use of the country's forests. An unusually large area of Cambodia has been designated as protected areas and biodiversity corridors, over 38% (more than 7 million hectares) of the total land mass, but many protections have subsequently been overruled by concessions sold to both national and foreign companies for agroindustrial plantations and mining developments, even in national parks.

The Cambodian government has been broadly criticized domestically and internationally for these contradicting policies, and a general lack of enforcement of environmental laws. They have faced pressures to practice a more sustainable forestry overall. The fate of Cambodia's forests will largely affect local communities that rely on the forests for their livelihood. Around 80% of its population lives in rural areas.

Cambodia's primary forest cover fell dramatically from over 70% in 1970 at the end of the Vietnam War to just 3.1% in 2007, when less than 3,220 square kilometers of primary forest remained. Deforestation is proceeding at an alarming rate: nearly 75% of forest loss has occurred since the end of 1990s. In total, Cambodia lost 25,000 square kilometers of forest between 1990 and 2005, 3,340 square kilometer of which was primary forest. As of 2016, 87,424 square kilometers of forest remained including 28, 612 square kilometers of evergreen forest, with the result that the future sustainability of Cambodia's forest reserves is under severe threat.

== Extent of deforestation ==
World Resources Institute data indicates that Cambodia was one of the top ten countries for primary tropical forest loss in 2021.

In Cambodia forest cover is around 46% of the total land area, equivalent to 8,068,370 hectares (ha) of forest in 2020, down from 11,004,790 hectares (ha) in 1990. In 2020, naturally regenerating forest covered 7,464,400 hectares (ha) and planted forest covered 603,970 hectares (ha). Of the naturally regenerating forest 4% was reported to be primary forest (consisting of native tree species with no clearly visible indications of human activity). For the year 2015, 100% of the forest area was reported to be under public ownership.

Open Development Cambodia, an NGO in Phnom Penh, Cambodia, used US satellite data to show a significant loss of forest cover from 72.1% in 1973 to 46.3% in 2014. Most of the loss occurred after 2000. Since 2001, the Royal Government of Cambodia (RGC) has suspended all the forest concession activities and prepared a sustainable forest management plan according to international standards.

In an effort to conserve forest cover, a limited amount of forest is allowed to be cut annually though a bidding process in order to supply the domestic timber demand. A harvest limit of 0.8m^{3} per hectare has been established with a 13-year cutting cycle, according to the National Forest Programme 2010–2029.

The RGC has set a Cambodia Millennium Development Goal to maintain national cover of 60% of total land area by 2015. This would require 532,615 hectares of non-forest land to be converted to forest land. However, as 2016, the forest cover remains 48.14%, equivalent to 87, 424 square kilometers.

Forest distribution varies nationwide. As of 2016, the hilly northwest and southeast region have the highest forest coverage rate. Among 25 provinces, 7 provinces have forest cover of more than 60%. If the Cambodian government does not move toward a more sustainable forest management, the value of Cambodia's forests is likely to decline.

Province	Forest Type					Total Non Forest (ha)	Grand Total (ha)
Province	Evergreen Forest	Semi-Evergreen Forest	Deciduous Forest	Other Forest	Total Forest (ha)	Total Non Forest (ha)	Grand Total (ha)
Banteay Meanchey	1,460	2,860	9,437	8,051	21,808	593,011	614,819
Battambang	59,483	16,382	20,075	171,573	267,513	919,697	1,187,210
Kampong Cham	658	59	641	50,923	52,281	402,893	455,174
Kampong Chhang	17,319	5,414	71,913	47,018	141,664	387,797	529,461
Kampong Speu	64,587	21,677	130,065	19,178	235,507	460,964	696,471
Kampong Thom	194,251	14,850	45,948	224,640	479,689	765,074	1,244,763
Kampot	125,764	3,924	27,758	4,970	162,416	309,399	471,815
Kandal	0	0	99	14,644	14,743	341,630	356,373
Kep	1,806	9	0	1,201	3,016	12,157	15,173
Koh Kong	839,938	11,632	24,404	95,247	971,221	240,374	1,211,595
Kratie	100,239	95,364	403,055	136,410	735,068	462,237	1,197,305
Mondul Kiri	131,439	212,341	803,665	67,975	1,215,420	151,472	1,366,892
Oddar Meanchey	50,051	18,639	104,912	16,361	189,963	473,202	663,165
Pailin	29,877	1,454	503	510	32,344	75,367	107,711
Phnom Penh	0	0	0	0	0	37,374	37,374
Preah Sihanouk	48,901	2,579	2	29,432	80,914	68,291	149,205
Preah Vihear	211,737	141,836	698,880	42,019	1,094,472	308,615	1,403,087
Prey Veng	19	0	92	1,613	1,724	474,436	476,160
Pursat	440,528	73,157	138,309	75,625	727,619	430,972	1,158,591
Ratanak Kiri	234,776	173,824	334,555	150,763	893,918	284,542	1,178,460
Siemreap	44,662	23,018	117,679	134,358	319,717	734,732	1,054,449
Stung Treng	261,240	252,779	395,117	62,181	971,317	230,344	1,201,661
Svay Rieng	28	0	0	5,189	5,217	281,608	286,825
Takeo	1,916	0	9,115	2,584	13,615	335,428	349,043
Thbang Khmom	554	149	125	108,844	109,672	383,450	493,122
Tonle Sap (Not province)	0	0	0	1,563	1,563	253,207	254770
Total Area (ha)	2,861,233	1,071,947	3,336,349	1,472,872	8,742,401	9,418,273	18,160,674
Percent (%)	15.76	5.90	18.37	8.11	48.14	51.86	100.00

=== Tree cover loss ===
Global Forest Watch publishes annual estimates of tree cover loss and 2000 tree cover extent derived from time-series analysis of Landsat satellite imagery in the Global Forest Change dataset. In this framework, tree cover refers to vegetation taller than 5 m (including natural forests and tree plantations), and tree cover loss is defined as the complete removal of tree cover canopy for a given year, regardless of cause.

For Cambodia, the dashboard reports that from 2001 to 2024 the country lost about 2,900,000 ha (29,000 km^{2}) of tree cover (about 33% of its 2000 tree cover area). For tree cover density greater than 30%, country statistics report a 2000 tree cover extent of 8,828,152 ha (88,281.52 km^{2}). The charts and table below display this data; in simple terms, the annual loss number is the area where tree cover disappeared in that year, and the extent number shows what remains of the 2000 tree cover baseline after subtracting cumulative loss (forest regrowth is not included in the dataset).

Annual tree cover loss in Cambodia, 2001–2024. View chart definition.
Tree cover extent in 2000 minus cumulative tree cover loss in Cambodia, 2001–2024 (loss-only residual; does not account for gain). View chart definition.

Annual tree cover loss
Year	Tree cover extent (km2) (Note: This residual measure does not include forest regrowth.)	Annual tree cover loss (km2)
2001	87,996.61	284.91
2002	87,447.45	549.16
2003	86,884.03	563.42
2004	86,106.63	777.40
2005	85,463.64	642.98
2006	84,631.53	832.11
2007	83,799.22	832.31
2008	82,919.82	879.40
2009	81,701.90	1,217.92
2010	79,322.16	2,379.74
2011	77,441.61	1,880.55
2012	75,501.97	1,939.64
2013	73,618.77	1,883.20
2014	71,974.38	1,644.39
2015	70,636.33	1,338.05
2016	68,818.19	1,818.14
2017	67,625.21	1,192.98
2018	66,456.93	1,168.28
2019	65,056.30	1,400.63
2020	63,637.19	1,419.11
2021	62,220.03	1,417.16
2022	61,181.23	1,038.80
2023	59,972.77	1,208.46
2024	59,066.47	934.77

== Causes ==
=== Government resource management for development ===
The Royal Government of Cambodia (RGC) sees great potential in Cambodia's forests to further the country's development. The government can use timber exports to acquire foreign currencies and create necessary revenue to support reconstruction and development. The World Bank considered the forest to be “one of the few important resources for development in Cambodia.” Starting in 1992, the RGC used revenue generated from the sale of forest products to finance various development projects.

Forest revenues as a percent of total government revenues decreased from 14 percent in 1994 to 5 percent in 1996. This revenue decrease and visible mismanagement of the forest sector spurred the IMF, World Bank, Food and Agriculture Organization, and the United Nations Development Program in 1994 and 1995 to review Cambodia's forest policies. Some forest policies have been reformed however the causes of deforestation cannot be fixed solely through policy.

Despite potential gains from utilizing forest resources, the government has faced pressures from domestic and international groups that are concerned about deforestation. Domestically, local communities rely on forests for timber and non-timber resources, as well as the positive contributions of the forest to rice farming and fisheries. Internationally, there are many nongovernment organizations and environmental organizations that have expressed concern over deforestation in Cambodia. In the 1990s, the Cambodian government passed and lifted many government bans on timber exports as a result from these pressures.

There are some barriers to forest development and sustainable forest management. In 1999, 35% to 40% of the forests were considered dangerous due to land mines, ongoing conflicts, and rogue armed forces. Cambodia has the highest number of land mines per capital. Land mines have prevented the utilization of forests. Another barrier is an absence of reliable data on existing forests relating to their extent, composition, and problems of access. Cambodia has very little data on their environment due to their prolonged civil war. UN organizations and international NGOs support most of the environmental activities such as collecting data. In addition, estimates of forestry output are unknown but are assumed to be over the legal mount due to illegal cutting.

Global Witness, a British NGO, criticizes RGC's management of forests. In a briefing document published in 1996, Global Witness describes how the RGC secretly creates forest policies that benefit them, their allies in the Thai government, and foreign businesses. Global Witness asserts that RGC's management of Cambodia's forest goes against the Cambodian Constitution. One example the Global Witness draws on to illustrate the collusion occurring within the RGC is the 1995 ban of cutting fresh timber and timber exports. Publicly the RGC implemented this two-year ban in order to fully assess the state of forests around the country with an ultimate goal to create a sustainable development plan for future forest use.

However, during this time, the RGC privately participated in forest concessions with foreign companies. One point of contention is that these forest concessions required the approval of only three government officials: the two Prime Ministers and the Minister of Agriculture. Global Witness argues that the fate of Cambodia's forests and therefore livelihoods of many Cambodians rested in a few hands of those with opposing interests.

Global Witness also says a vast illegal logging operation is driving the country's rarest tree species to the brink of extinction with government and military officials acting with impunity to keep the operation functioning. Another Global Witness report in 2015 said, "government and industry insiders, including people who work for Okhna Try Pheap, indicated that entrenched corruption had ensured loggers in his network were given safe passage and immunity from timber confiscations and penalties."

This report also named Cambodian timber magnate Try Pheap at the center of a large illegal logging enterprise driving Cambodia's rarest tree species to the brink of extinction. The report concludes that the operation of the illegal logging is being done with the collusion of government and military officials with virtually all of the illegally cut and transported wood going to China.

=== Commercial logging ===
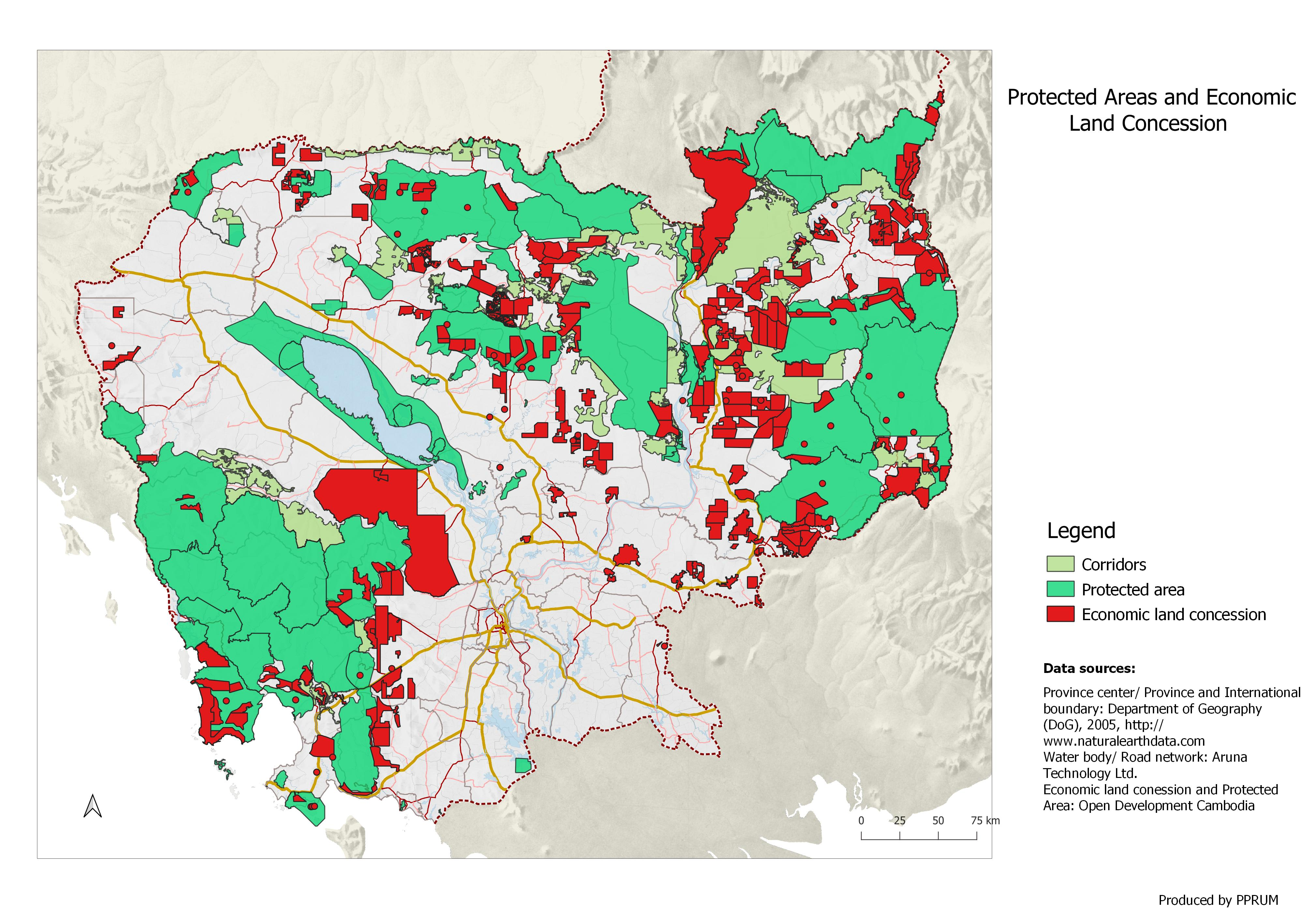
This map shows the overlapping areas between protected areas and economic land concessions.

The last decade has seen central forest management placing a priority on commercial timber interests which often coincide with large scale deforestation. By 1999, over 4.7 million hectares were granted to 25 private companies for commercial logging. The wood production in 1997 is this country was 3.4 million cubic meters which 5 times over the sustainable forest yield. Environmental and social aspects of sustainable forest management were largely ignored. This has led to over-logging, conflicts with local communities over rights, and limited contribution to national development and poverty alleviation.

Foreign enterprises began to take part in commercial logging after the Paris Peace Agreement in 1991. The period of 1994–96 saw an increase of forest concessions to private companies which reflected the RGC's move toward liberalizing its economy. In 1996, the World Band, United Nations Development Program, and Food and Agriculture Organization advocated for market-oriented policy reform regarding the management of Cambodia's forests in order to increase forest revenue and avoid overexploitation.

There are two kinds of agreements concerning commercial logging: investment agreement and forest timber license. Investment agreements are concessions are given to those who have invested in facilities for logging and wood processing. Forest timber licenses are contracts signed between an enterprise and senior government officials. The details of the contract are not open to the public. The details of the contract have limited public transparency, but 84 concession agreements are accessible through the open data portal of Open Development Cambodia. The contract often includes sustainable forestry guidelines but they are rarely enforced.

The international price for forests are $74/cubic meter compared to $14/cubic meter in Cambodia. The undervaluing of Cambodian forests has contributed to foreign acquisition and loss of profit for Cambodia.

Cambodia has implemented economic land concessions (ELCs) for agro-industrial development and forest land concessions, in effort to liberalize their economy. Supporters of the policy argue that ELCs to encourage investment from abroad, new technology for agriculture, linking of trade markets, and create new jobs. On the other hand, critics of the policy argue that ELCs will disposes local communities of their land rights, threaten their livelihood, and create social problems. The granted concessions often overlap with occupied community lands. In 2014, around one third of the land conflict occurred in Cambodia was caused by economic land concessions (97 out of 308 land conflict cases).

As of 2015, economic land concessions (15,300 square kilometers in 18 provinces) were granted to 267 companies, including 3,800 square kilometers of protected area, according to the NGO Forum on Cambodia. Another source from LICADO, shows that the total size of ELC was 18,300 square kilometers granted to 228 companies, of which 96 are locally owned 128 are foreign owned, and the remaining 4 are unknown.

The biggest criticism of land concessions for economic purposes is the lack of transparency. Often, distribution of the land concessions and the use of the land is unknown outside of the government and those granted land concessions. Often land concessions have been cleared but not cultivated. This raises questions to whether the land concessions were for productive development or land grabbing.

=== Illegal logging ===
Illegal logging poses a large threat to Cambodia's forests. It allows for undocumented and unauthorized deforestation in which allows for the exploitation of Cambodia's forests. There are many cases in which the military carries out illegal logging without knowledge from the government. It is difficult for central government officials to visit areas still controlled by former Pol Pot forces. Illegal commercial timber interests take advantage of weak law enforcement to benefit from illegal cutting. The majority of illegal deforestation is done by the military and powerful sub-contractors.

=== Local use ===
The Cambodian population has increased gradually with the annual growth rate over 1.5% since 2005. As of 2019, the total population increased to 15.29 million people, according to provisional results from Cambodia's 2019 census. The 2019 census shows that the provinces with high forest cover rate have a high annual growth rate: Preah Vihear province (3.5%), followed by Mondul Kiri (3.4%), Stung Treng (3.2%), Otdar Meanchey (3.1%) and Ratanak Kiri (2.8%). Cambodians living near or in forests depend on forests resources for a variety of products and services. Forest-dependent people almost exclusively extract non-timber forest products, rather than timber extraction. Non-timber forest products are used for both subsistence and commercial purposes. Non-Timber forest products include food, medicine, agricultural inputs, and fuel. Forest dwelling people and indigenous entrepreneurs have relied on the forest as a vital source of income for nearly two thousand years.

Timber resources are used for building materials, firewood, and charcoal production. The use of fossil fuels is rare in Cambodia; fuelwood represents 90% of its energy supply. Fuelwood production has been the main cause of deforestation in locations such as the inundated forest of Tonle Sap. Garment factories in Cambodia have contributed to deforestation by using firewood to generate electricity.

A study conducted by the Cambodia Development Resource Institute found that poor households in the survey gained 42 percent of their livelihood value from forests, equal to $200/household annually. Medium households obtained an average of 30 percent of their livelihood value from forests, equal to $345/household annually. The forests contribute greatly to the livelihoods of rural households living near forests. Deforestation negatively affects these communities by threatening their livelihoods. The poor, who have restricted access to various resources and means of income are more dependent on forest resources. Forest management should be integrated with Environmental rural development and poverty reduction strategies.

=== International demand ===
The international timber trade drives demand for Cambodian forest wood. A great deal of timber from Cambodian forests is exported to China and neighbouring Vietnam.

== Impacts ==
=== Environmental ===
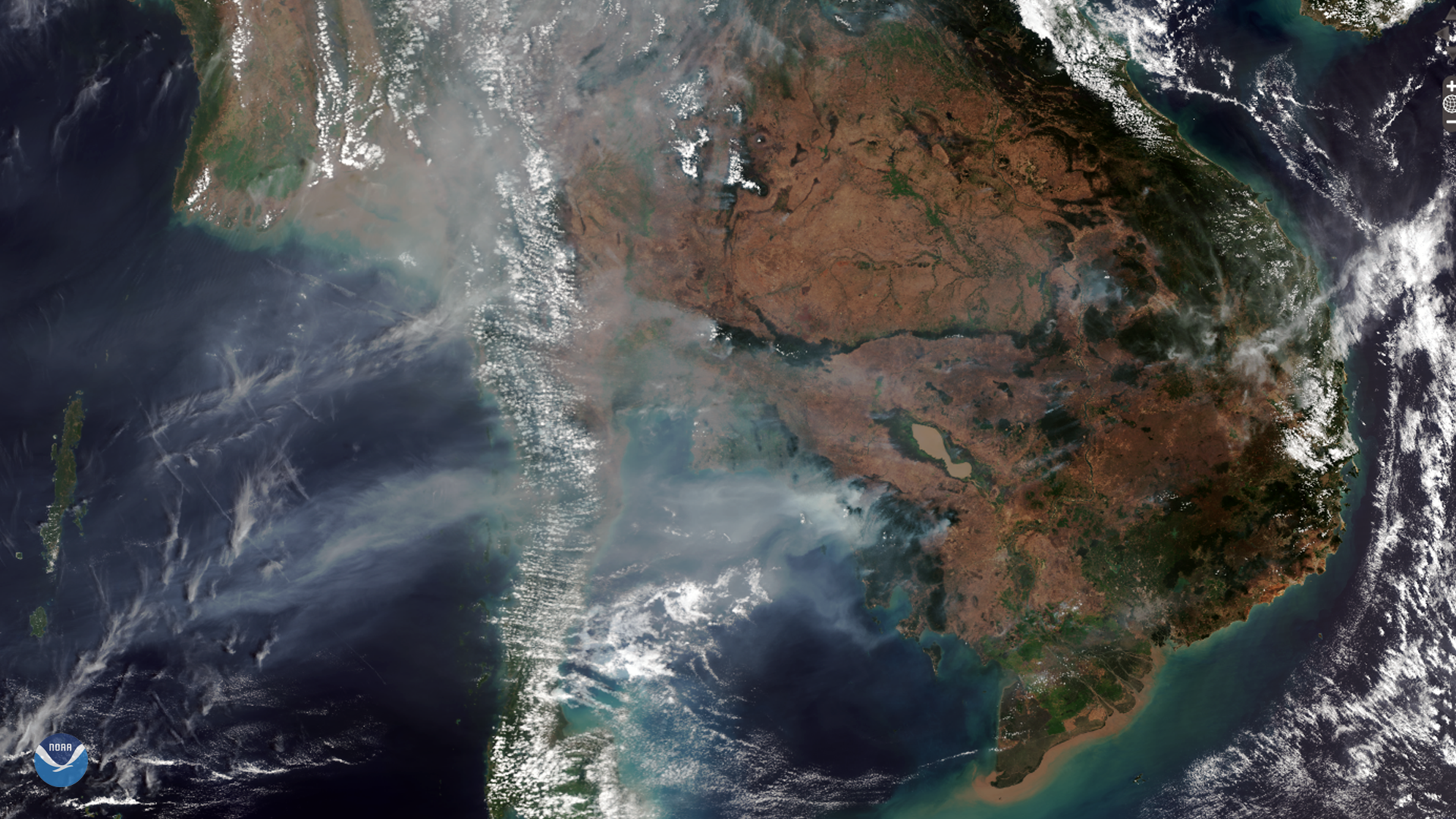
Satellite image of forest fires in Cambodia in February 2020.

Cambodia's forests are important on a national and global scale. Forests provide positive impacts on their surroundings such as watershed protection, carbon storage, recreation, and biodiversity conservation. In addition, they include scarce primeval tropical rainforests with rich biodiversity and absorb greenhouse gases. In 1999, Cambodia's total forest area was 11 million hectare, which stored 150 tons of carbon each, resulting in Cambodia's forest storing 1.6 billion tons of carbon per year. With every 100,000 hectare of deforestation, 15 million tons of carbon will remain in the atmosphere.

=== Rice crops ===
The forests are especially important for water currents that are used to irrigate rice crops. Decrease in forest cover contributes to erosion, flooding, and siltation of streams which compromises water currents which directly support the livelihoods of the Cambodian people.

=== Fisheries ===
Deforestation negatively affects the productivity of Cambodia's freshwater bodies which provides food in the form of fish for many Cambodians. The productivity of Cambodia's freshwater bodies, such as the Mekong River, the Great Lake and Tonle Sap River, rely on the inundation of forests. Inundated forests allow for phytoplankton and zooplankton development, shelter for juvenile and adult fish species, and serve as reproduction zones. However, high productivity, biodiversity, and rich vegetation have declined in the last several decades due to deforestation and other environmental degradation and overexploitation.

This has negative impacts on many Cambodians. Around 90% of Cambodia's population is concentrated on the riparian provinces of the Mekong River, the Great Lake, and the Tonle Sap River. Cambodians, especially poor rural rice farmers, rely on the freshwater bodies for subsistence fishing. Freshwater fish is the basic and most prevalent food of Cambodia after rice, it makes up 70% of animal protein in Cambodian diets. Deforestation has decreased fishing capabilities by reducing the area available for productive ecological activities such as breeding in addition to restricting access for fishermen.

=== Wildlife ===
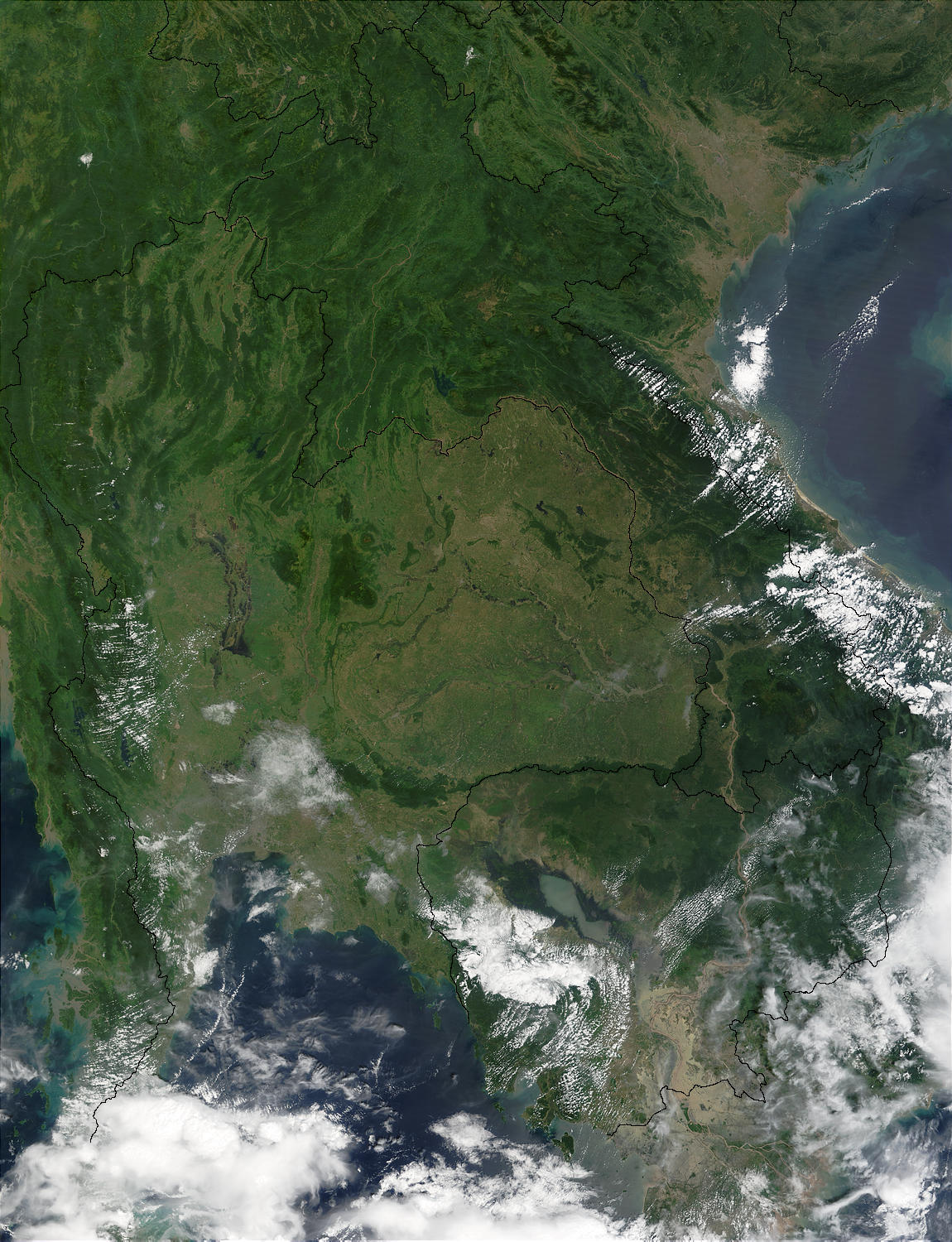
The effects of deforestation and subsequent flooding can be seen from space on ordinary satellite images. This image is from the Terra satellite in 2002.

Numerous species of globally endangered wildlife inhabitant Cambodia's forests. Keo Seima Wildlife Sanctuary serves as the habitat for over 60 species listed as Globally Threatened, Near-threatened or Data Deficient by IUCN criteria. Prey Lang Wildlife Sanctuary is home to 50 threatened species and 21 species prioritized for genetic conservation. The decline [MD1] of wildlife species in Cambodia is driven by the depletion of habitat. Deforestation from commercial and illegal logging and land use conversion are the leading causes of the decline or depletion of habitat.

=== Indigenous people ===
Approximately 200,000 indigenous people always are identified in 24 groups scattered over 15 southwestern and northeastern provinces of Cambodia. They live in remote and isolated areas surrounded by forest[2]. Their livelihoods and culture depend on forests. Their main income, food, clothing, and medicine are based on the collection of non-timber forest products.

== Preventive measures ==
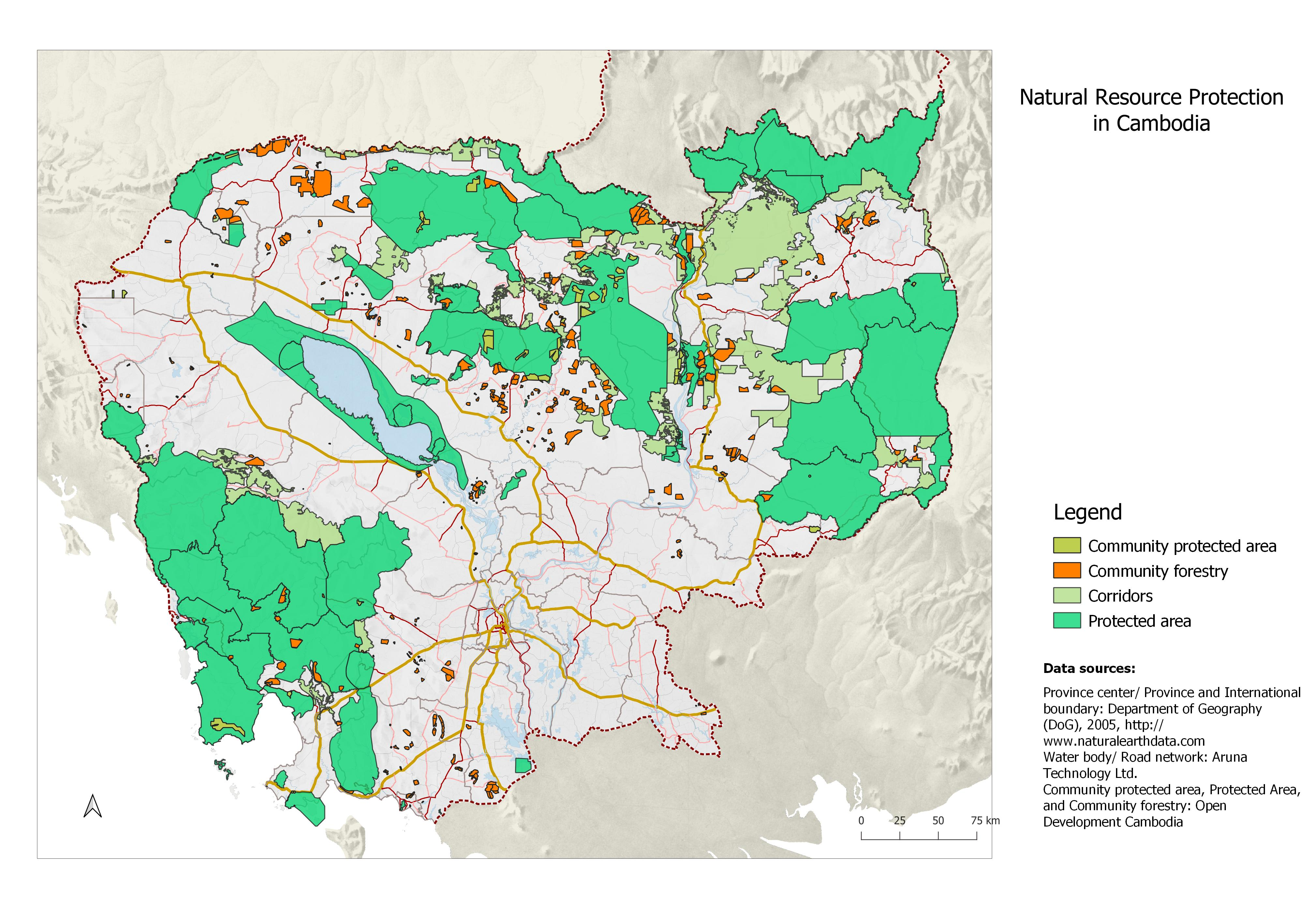
This map shows the 2019 protected areas, community forestry and community protected area.

=== Community forestry ===
The concept of community forestry started in India in the 1970s. It acknowledges that local communities in forest regions have knowledge and skills to use forests in a sustainable manner. Their knowledge is rooted in the ecological, cultural, and social characteristics of the community. In community forests, local residents are given certain rights and become the main actors of forest management. The goal of community forests is not to make profits or directly support the current residents by itself, but rather to promote sustainable and effective use of environmental resources and their fair distribution for the present and future generations.

Community forests, established in 1994 in Cambodia, aims to ensure locals rights to forest resources. This program allows for locals to directly participate in the protection, conservation, and development of forest resources. Some challenges that have arisen are conflicting interests with how to manage forests within communities, the government's reluctance to transfer resource management power to communities, powerful special interests overshadowing local interests, the costs of management, and lack of needed assistance.

Some researchers argue that the community forestry framework requires industrial forestry reform as well as redefined policies for rural development. Despite its shortcomings, this program has grown very popular among those who live in rural areas. As of 2016, 610 communities participate in community forestry, covering 5,066 square kilometers in 21 provinces. Community forests only cover 2.8 percent of Cambodia's land area which is extremely small compared to the concessions given to commercial forestry.

Community forestry units in Cambodia:

Province	No. districts	No. communes	No. community forestry units	Area (ha)
Kep	3	2	2	1,009
Koh Kong	13	4	8	17,514.41
Kratie	46	6	19	72,993
Tbong Khmum	11	2	3	3,521
Kampong Chnnang	34	5	16	11,019.7
Kampong Thom	87	7	29	84,225.52
Kampong Speu	39	6	24	17,744
Kampot	33	7	22	13,543
Takeo	13	2	14	10,791
Banteay Meanchey	12	4	9	4,970
Pailin	4	2	4	858
Battambang	32	7	14	11,095.25
Pursat	91	6	24	17,773
Preah Vihear	47	6	19	72,040
Mondulkiri	8	3	4	10,268
Ratanakiri	37	7	19	22,754
Siemreap	57	12	30	31,263
Stung Treng	13	3	16	35,557.28
Svay Rieng	8	6	9	1,219.7
Oddar Meanchey	14	4	9	65,168
Preah Sihanouk	2	1	2	1,274

=== Community Protected Areas ===
The first protected area was established in 1998 under the reign of King Sihanouk. However, the law on protected areas was adopted in 2008 to govern biodiversity and ensure the sustainability of natural resource within the protected areas. This law recognized the rights of indigenous communities and the general public to participate in decision making on managing and conserving biodiversity in a sustainable approach. Community protected areas is a mechanism to engage the local community including indigenous people, who are the primary natural resource users, in planning, monitoring and decision making on protected area management. As of 2018, the number of community protected areas has increased to 153 communities within 51 protected areas.

The communities are the ecological safeguards and they cooperate with the Ministry of Environment to patrol the forest and protect against environmental crimes such as illegal logging and poaching. The communities receive income from collecting non-timber products and funding support from government and development partners. Since 2017, more than US$32 million are provided by international development partners to support nature conservation and protection of protected areas.

=== Governance and legal framework ===
Although the law on protected areas gave a legal foundation to the Ministry of Environment (MOE) to govern protected areas, some areas such as conservation area and protected forest are under the governance of the Forestry Administration, the Ministry of Agriculture, Forestry and Fisheries (MAFF). The economic land concession, which is a state land lease to the private sector for agroindustry development, is governed by MOE and MAFF. In April 2016, the RGC decided to transfer 18 conservation forests over 2.6 million hectares from MAFF to MOE while 73 ELC were transferred to the authority of MAFF. In 2017, the RGC has created a 1.4 million-hectare biodiversity conservation corridor which is the bridge connecting protected areas across the whole country.

An environmental code has been drafted since 2015 with public consultation from community, NGO and development partners. This code strengthens the effectiveness of environmental protection, conservation management, and restored natural resources and biodiversity. This law guarantees open access to environmental information and includes guidelines for sustainable resource management and environmental impact assessment for development projects, according to the eleventh draft of the environmental code. The law is in draft 11th as of April 2018.

=== Reducing Emissions from Deforestation and forest Degradation (REDD+) Program ===
RGC adopted the National REDD+ Strategy (NRS) 2017 – 2021. This policy established an inter-ministry platform for combating climate change effects through the improvement of natural resources and forest area. REDD+ is a program that allows private companies to purchase and protect carbon stocks from developing countries as a part of cooperate social responsibility or climate commitments. These projects provide funding for protected area management, and provide alternative, sustainable land use options compared to other uses like economic land concessions. In 2016, the Walt Disney Corporation purchased carbon credits worth US$2.6 million from Cambodia. Since 2016, Cambodia has received over US$11 million from carbon credits.

Cambodia has submitted national forest reference levels (FRLs) under the UNFCCC REDD+ framework through the UNFCCC REDD+ Web Platform. These reference levels provide benchmarks for assessing REDD+ performance in the context of results-based payments, and each proposed FRL is subject to a UNFCCC technical assessment.

Cambodia’s first assessed national FRL (technical assessment published in 2018) used a historical reference period of 2006–2014 and covered three REDD+ activities: reducing emissions from deforestation, reducing emissions from forest degradation, and enhancement of forest carbon stocks. Following the facilitative technical assessment process, the FRL was revised from 79,245,653 to an assessed value of 78,953,951 tonnes of carbon dioxide equivalent (t CO_{2} eq) per year, expressed as an annual average of net CO_{2} emissions/removals. The assessment described activity data derived from Landsat-based land-use/cover maps (2006, 2010 and 2014) and noted that, at the time, emission factors were compiled from available studies and existing forest inventory surveys (rather than a single national forest inventory).

Cambodia submitted an updated (second) national FRL in 2021 for the reference period 2011–2018. In the modified submission used for the technical assessment, the scope was limited to deforestation only, and the assessed FRL corresponded to 60,257,501 t CO_{2} eq per year, with an uncertainty of 11.07%. The technical assessment noted that the earlier assessed FRL for 2006–2014 was higher than the 2011–2018 FRL, and attributed the differences mainly to changes in the reference period and methodological updates (including the exclusion of enhancement of forest carbon stocks from the modified 2021 submission), meaning the headline FRL values are not a simple like-for-like indicator of deforestation trend changes.

Cambodia has also developed a draft national forest monitoring system (NFMS) for REDD+ implementation and broader forest management. The NFMS document describes a phased approach that builds on existing mechanisms and tools, combining remote sensing and ground-based approaches, and notes that national forest cover mapping has been undertaken periodically (e.g., approximately every four years) using satellite imagery. The UNFCCC REDD+ Web Platform hosts Cambodia’s NFMS documentation alongside its REDD+ submissions and technical assessment materials.

=== Afforestation ===
According to the Forestry Department of the Ministry of Agriculture, the Cambodian government started afforestation projects in 1985. The reforesting plan was 500-800 hectares per year, towards a goal of 100,000 hectares (1000 km^{2}. 7,500 hectares (7.5 km^{2}) had been forested by 1997; limited funds prohibited more ambitious coverage.

The annual Arbor Day holiday on 9 July, early in the rainy season, is when Cambodians are encouraged to plant trees. Educational programmes on seeds and soil are offered in schools and temples, and afforestation measures are advertised through TV and radio.

== See also ==
- Climate change in Cambodia
- Hunting in Cambodia
