= Pate, Cambodia =

Pate ប៉ាតេ
- Commune
- Location within Cambodia
- Coordinates: 13°38′41″N 107°20′14″E
- Country: Cambodia
- Province: Ratanakiri Province
- District: Ou Ya Dav District
- Villages: 4

Population (1998)
  - Total: 1,329
- Time zone: UTC+07
- Geocode: 160704

Pate (Khmer: ប៉ាតេ) is a commune in Ou Ya Dav District in northeast Cambodia. It contains four villages and has a population of 1,329. In the 2007 commune council elections, three of the commune's five seats went to the Sam Rainsy Party and two went to the Cambodian People's Party. The land alienation rates in Pate was high as of January 2006. (See Ratanakiri Province for background information on land alienation.)

Village	Population (1998)	Sex ratio (male/female) (1998)	Number of households (1998)	Notes
Plang	279	0.99	39	
Kong Thum	710	0.93	102	
Pa Ar	170	0.81	28	
Yu	170	0.87	38	
