= Saom Thum =

Saom Thum សោមធំ
- Commune
- Location within Cambodia
- Coordinates: 13°44′02″N 107°22′59″E
- Country: Cambodia
- Province: Ratanakiri Province
- District: Ou Ya Dav District
- Villages: 3

Population (1998)
  - Total: 1,964
- Time zone: UTC+07
- Geocode: 160706

Saom Thum (Khmer: សោមធំ) is a commune in Ou Ya Dav District in northeast Cambodia. It contains three villages and has a population of 1,964. In the 2007 commune council elections, three of the commune's five seats went to the Cambodian People's Party and two went to the Sam Rainsy Party. The land alienation rates in Saom Thum was low as of January 2006. (See Ratanakiri Province for background information on land alienation.)

Village	Population (1998)	Sex ratio (male/female) (1998)	Number of households (1998)	Notes
Saom Klueng	852	0.91	131	
Saom Trak	696	0.92	136	
Saom Kol	416	1.06	62	
