= Bar Kham =

Bar Kham បរខាំ
- Commune
- Location within Cambodia
- Coordinates: 13°31′52″N 107°19′36″E
- Country: Cambodia
- Province: Ratanakiri Province
- District: Ou Ya Dav District
- Villages: 6

Population (1998)
  - Total: 1,392
- Time zone: UTC+07
- Geocode: 160701

Bar Kham (Khmer: បរខាំ) is a commune in Ou Ya Dav District in northeast Cambodia. It contains six villages and has a population of 1,392. In the 2007 commune council elections, three of the commune's five seats went to the Cambodian People's Party, one went to the Sam Rainsy Party, and one went to Funcinpec. The land alienation rate in Bar Kham was high as of January 2006. (See Ratanakiri Province for background information on land alienation.)

Village	Population (1998)	Sex ratio (male/female) (1998)	Number of households (1998)	Notes
Tung	174	0.83	21	
Deh	96	1.29	16	
Plor	295	0.93	28	
Phnong	342	1.11	62	
Kok Chray	223	0.99	45	
Pril	262	1	53	
