= Pak Nhai =

Pak Nhai ប៉ក់ញ៉ៃ
- Commune
- Location within Cambodia
- Coordinates: 13°42′05″N 107°30′02″E
- Country: Cambodia
- Province: Ratanakiri Province
- District: Ou Ya Dav District
- Villages: 4

Population (1998)
  - Total: 2,156
- Time zone: UTC+07
- Geocode: 160703

Pak Nhai (Khmer: ប៉ក់ញ៉ៃ) is a commune in Ou Ya Dav District in northeast Cambodia. It contains four villages and has a population of 2,156. In the 2007 commune council elections, three of the commune's five seats went to the Cambodian People's Party and two went to the Sam Rainsy Party. The land alienation rate in Pak Nhai was severe as of January 2006. (See Ratanakiri Province for background information on land alienation.)

| Village | Population (1998) | Sex ratio (male/female) (1998) | Number of households (1998) | Notes |
|---|---|---|---|---|
| Pak Thum | 956 | 1.14 | 162 | |
| Pak Touch | 228 | 1.11 | 45 | |
| Pak Por | 311 | 0.94 | 51 | |
| Lom | 661 | 1.02 | 119 | |
