= Mokrý Lom =

- Municipality
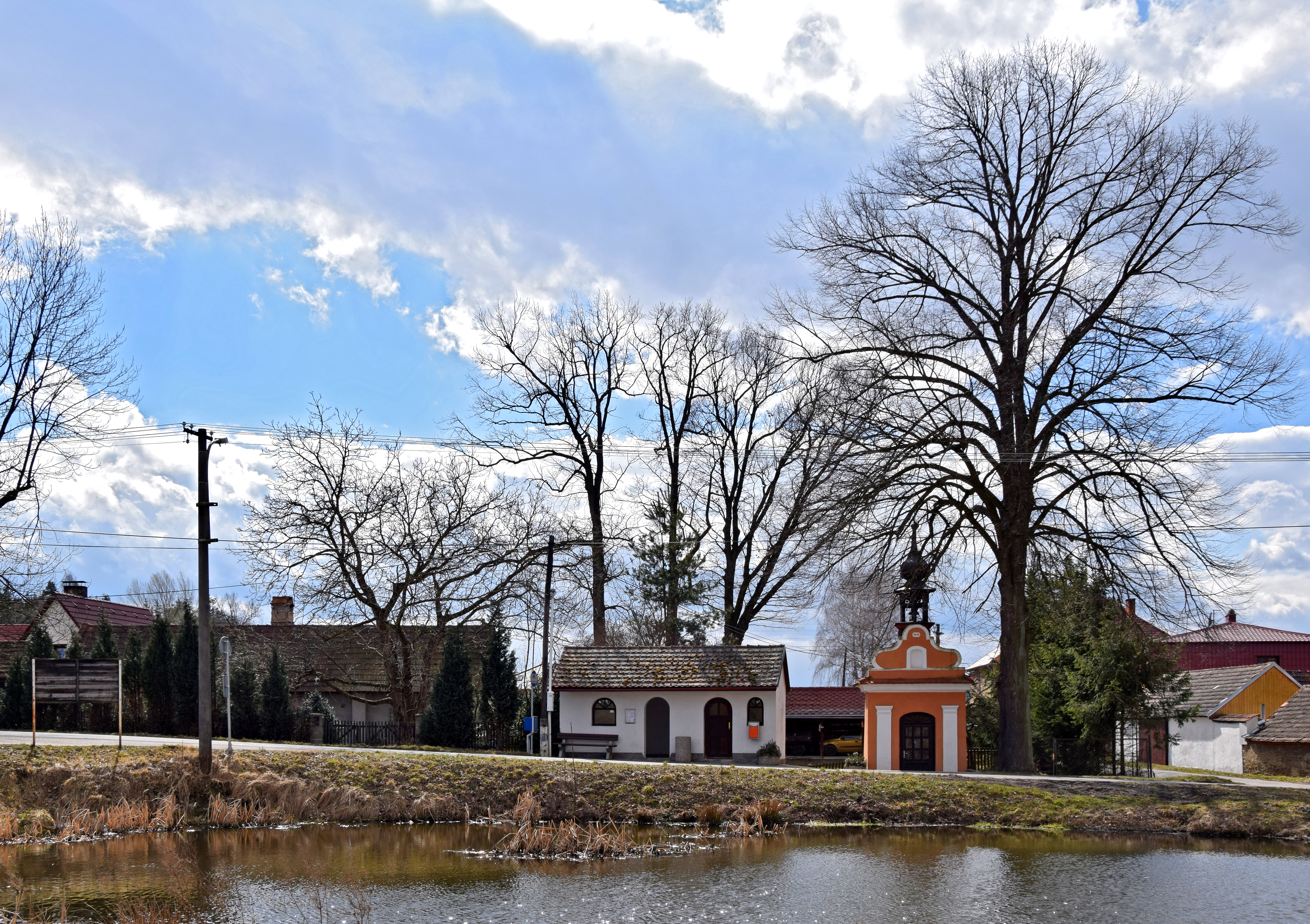
- Centre of Mokrý Lom

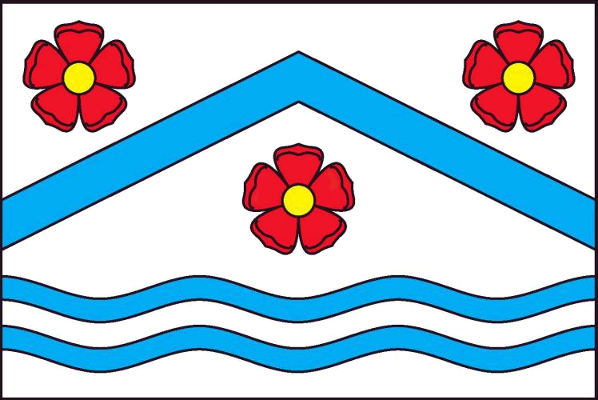
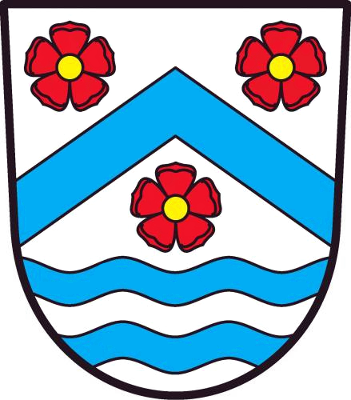
- Flag Coat of arms

- Location in the Czech Republic
- Coordinates: 48°50′41″N 14°30′51″E
- Country: Czech Republic
- Region: South Bohemian
- District: České Budějovice
- First mentioned: 1362

Area
  - Total: 3.56 km^{2} (1.37 sq mi)
- Elevation: 515 m (1,690 ft)

Population (2026-01-01)
  - Total: 113
  - Density: 31.7/km^{2} (82.2/sq mi)
- Time zone: UTC+1 (CET)
  - Summer (DST): UTC+2 (CEST)
- Postal code: 374 01
- Website: www.mokrylom.cz

Mokrý Lom is a municipality and village in České Budějovice District in the South Bohemian Region of the Czech Republic. It has about 100 inhabitants.

== Administrative division ==
Mokrý Lom consists of three municipal parts (in brackets population according to the 2021 census):

- Mokrý Lom (90)
- Lahuť (8)
- Polžov (19)

== Etymology ==
The word lom has several meanings in Czech. The name Mokrý Lom can be translated as 'wet quarry' or 'wet bend', but in Old Czech, lom was also used for 'crack', 'fight' and 'defeat'.

== Geography ==
Mokrý Lom is located about 14 kilometres (9 mi) south of České Budějovice. It lies in the Gratzen Foothills. The highest point is at 541 m (1,775 ft) above sea level.

== History ==
The first written mention of Mokrý Lom is from 1362. The village was a part of the Velešín estate until 1387, when it was acquired by the Rosenberg family.

After the revolution in 1850, when modern municipalities were established, Mokrý Lom became part of Sedlce. In 1924, Mokrý Lom was separated and thus the current municipality was created.

== Demographics ==
Historical population

Year	Pop.	±%
1869	206	—
1880	174	−15.5%
1890	177	+1.7%
1900	194	+9.6%
1910	206	+6.2%

Year	Pop.	±%
1921	202	−1.9%
1930	176	−12.9%
1950	111	−36.9%
1961	102	−8.1%
1970	95	−6.9%

Year	Pop.	±%
1980	105	+10.5%
1991	73	−30.5%
2001	67	−8.2%
2011	102	+52.2%
2021	117	+14.7%

Source: Censuses

== Transport ==
There are no railways or major roads passing through the municipality.

== Sights ==
The only protected cultural monument in the municipality is a Baroque chapel from 1848, located in the centre of Mokrý Lom.
