= Lom (Tábor District) =

- Municipality
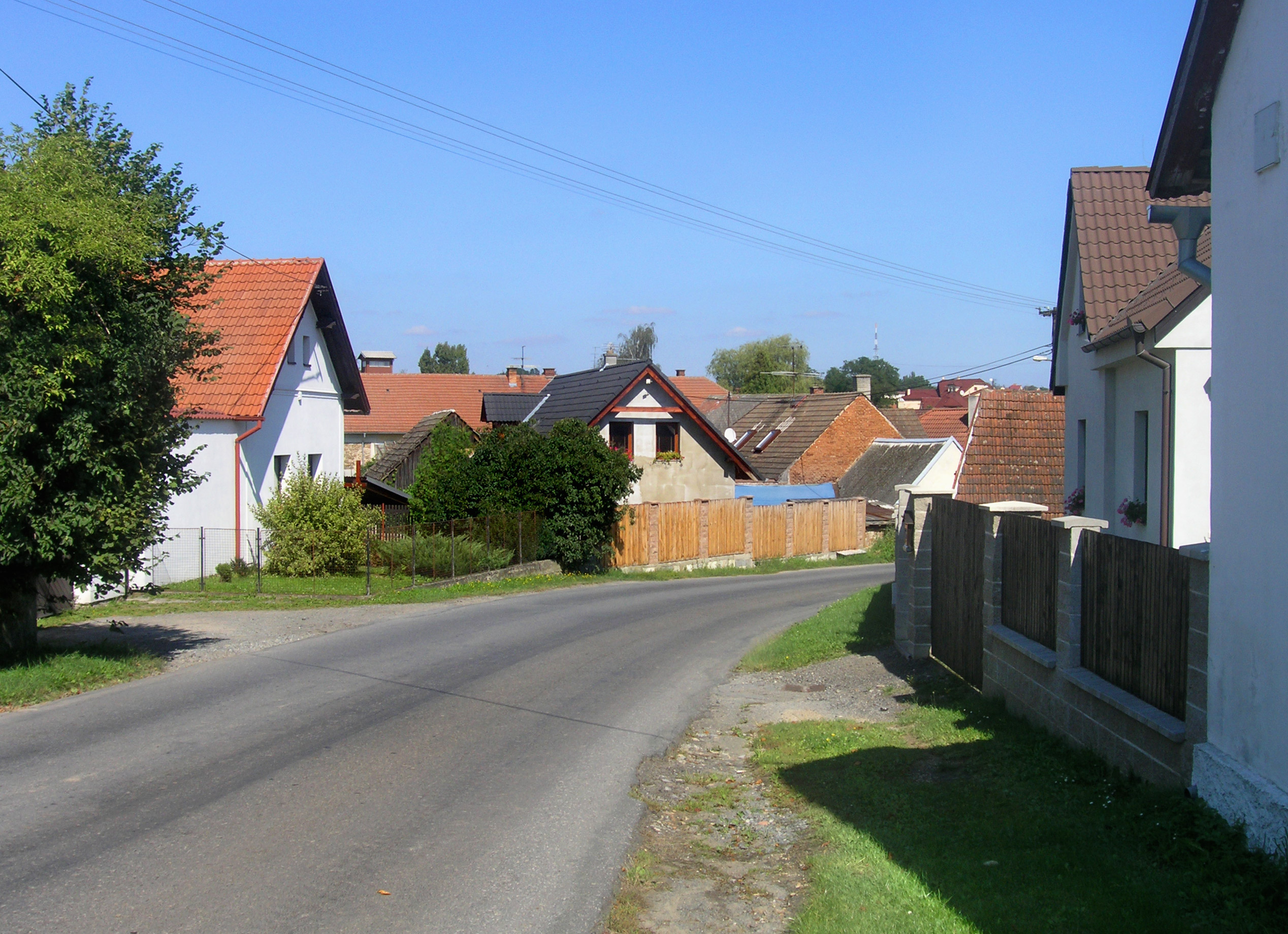
- Main street

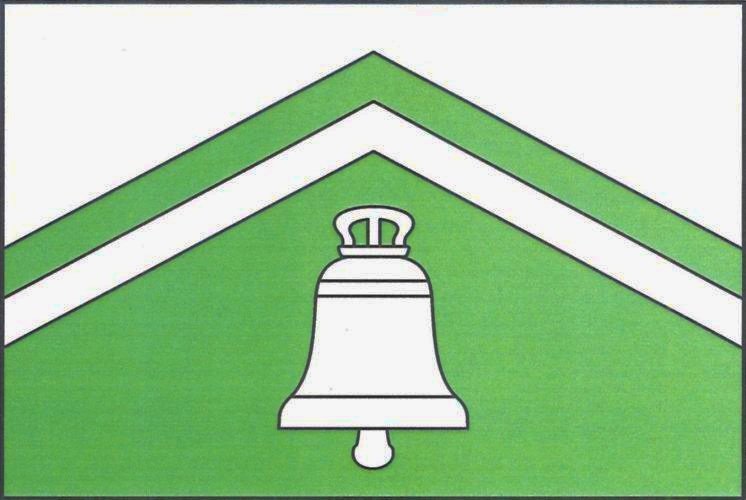
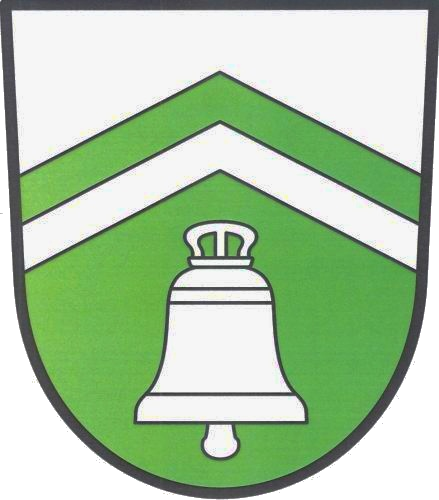
- Flag Coat of arms

- Location in the Czech Republic
- Coordinates: 49°21′47″N 14°37′42″E
- Country: Czech Republic
- Region: South Bohemian
- District: Tábor
- First mentioned: 1347

Area
  - Total: 3.83 km^{2} (1.48 sq mi)
- Elevation: 460 m (1,510 ft)

Population (2026-01-01)
  - Total: 172
  - Density: 44.9/km^{2} (116/sq mi)
- Time zone: UTC+1 (CET)
  - Summer (DST): UTC+2 (CEST)
- Postal code: 390 02
- Website: www.obec-lom.cz

Lom is a municipality and village in Tábor District in the South Bohemian Region of the Czech Republic. It has about 200 inhabitants.

Lom lies approximately 7 kilometres (4 mi) south of Tábor, 45 km (28 mi) north of České Budějovice, and 82 km (51 mi) south of Prague.

== Demographics ==
Historical population
Year	Pop.	±%
1869	240	—
1880	235	−2.1%
1890	201	−14.5%
1900	181	−10.0%
1910	204	+12.7%
1921	216	+5.9%
1930	195	−9.7%
1950	172	−11.8%
1961	155	−9.9%
1970	158	+1.9%
1980	179	+13.3%
1991	147	−17.9%
2001	137	−6.8%
2011	150	+9.5%
2021	169	+12.7%
Source: Censuses
