= Agence Kampuchea Presse =

National news agency of Cambodia

Agence Kampuchea Press (AKP; Khmer: ទីភ្នាក់ងារសារព័ត៌មានកម្ពុជា) is the national news agency of Cambodia.
