= Ou Ya Dav District =

Coordinates: 13.5205°N 107.4326°E

Ou Ya Dav អូរយ៉ាដាវ
- District
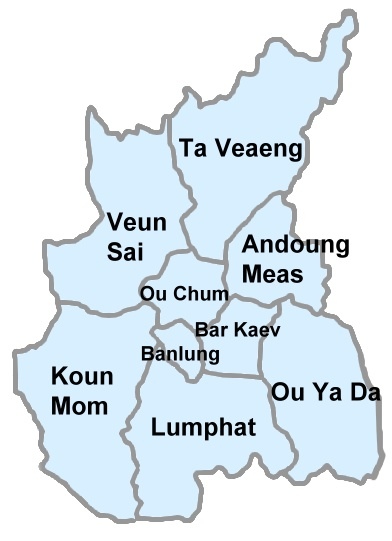
- Location in Ratanakiri

- Location of Ratanakiri in Cambodia
- Country: Cambodia
- Province: Ratanakiri
- Communes: 7

Area
  - Total: 1,613.8 km^{2} (623.1 sq mi)

Population (2019)
  - Total: 23,932
- Time zone: UTC+7 (ICT)
- Geocode: 8405030
- District code: 1407

Ou Ya Dav District (Khmer: អូរយ៉ាដាវ) is a district in Ratanakiri Province, northeastern Cambodia. The district center is located approximately 42 km (26 mi) from the provincial capital Banlung. It covers an area of approximately 161.38 km^{2} (62.31 sq mi) and had a population of 23,932 in 2019. It is subdivided into seven communes and 29 villages.

== Geography ==
Ou Ya Dav is one of the nine districts (srok) of Ratanakiri province, Cambodia. It covers an area of approximately 161.38 km^{2} (62.31 sq mi), of which 33.61 km^{2} (12.98 sq mi) was classified as forest land, 129.11 km^{2} (49.85 sq mi) as cultivation land, 15.97 km^{2} (6.17 sq mi) as construction land, and 20.69 km^{2} (7.99 sq mi) as other land in 2009. The district center is located approximately 42 km (26 mi) from the provincial capital Banlung. It is bordered by Lumphat District to the west, Bar Kaev District to the northwest, Andoung Meas District to the north, and Kaoh Nheaek District to the south. Ou Ya Dav shares an international border with Vietnam. The Ou Ya Dav International Border Checkpoint connects Cambodia with the Lệ Thanh checkpoint in Gia Lai province, Vietnam. It has a tropical savanna climate as per the Köppen climate classification.

== Administration ==
The district is headed by a district governor. Ou Ya Dav District is subdivided into seven communes (khum)– Bar Kham, Lum Choar, Pak Nhai, Pate, Sesant, Saom Thum, Ya Tung. The communes are administrated by a commune council headed by a commune chief elected directly for a five year period. The communes are further subdivided into 29 villages (phum), which are each headed by a village chief, appointed by the corresponding commune council. Bar Kham and Lum Choar are the closest villages to the district administration, located approximately 5 km (3.1 mi) away, while Ya Tung is the farthest, at approximately 26 km (16 mi).

Commune	Villages	Population (1998)	Map
Bar Kham	Tung, Deh, Plor, Kok Pnong, Ta Kok Chray, Pril	3,831	
Lum Choar	Pralae, Ka Te, Trang, Un	2,790	
Pak Nhai	Pak Thum, Pak Touch, Pak Por, Lam	4,702	
Pate	Plang, Kong Thum, Pa Ar, Kong Yu	3,287	
Sesant	Ka Tang, Phi, Pa Dal	2,041	
Saom Thum	Saom Klueng, Saom Trak, Saom Kol	4,082	
Ya Tung	Ten Ngol, Peak, TenSoh, Dar, Sam	3,199	

== Demographics ==
According to the 1998 census, Ou Ya Dav District had a population of 10,898 including 5,410 males and 5,488 females. The district had 1,847 households, with an average household size of 5.9 persons. The population increased to 15,403 in 2008. As per the 2019 census, the population was 23,932, including 11,976 males and 11,956 females. The district had 5,682 households, with an average household size of 4.2 persons.

In 2008, approximately 95% of families in the district were engaged primarily in agriculture, with 87% of families involved in rice cultivation. The rest of the population was engaged in services (2%) and trade (1%).
