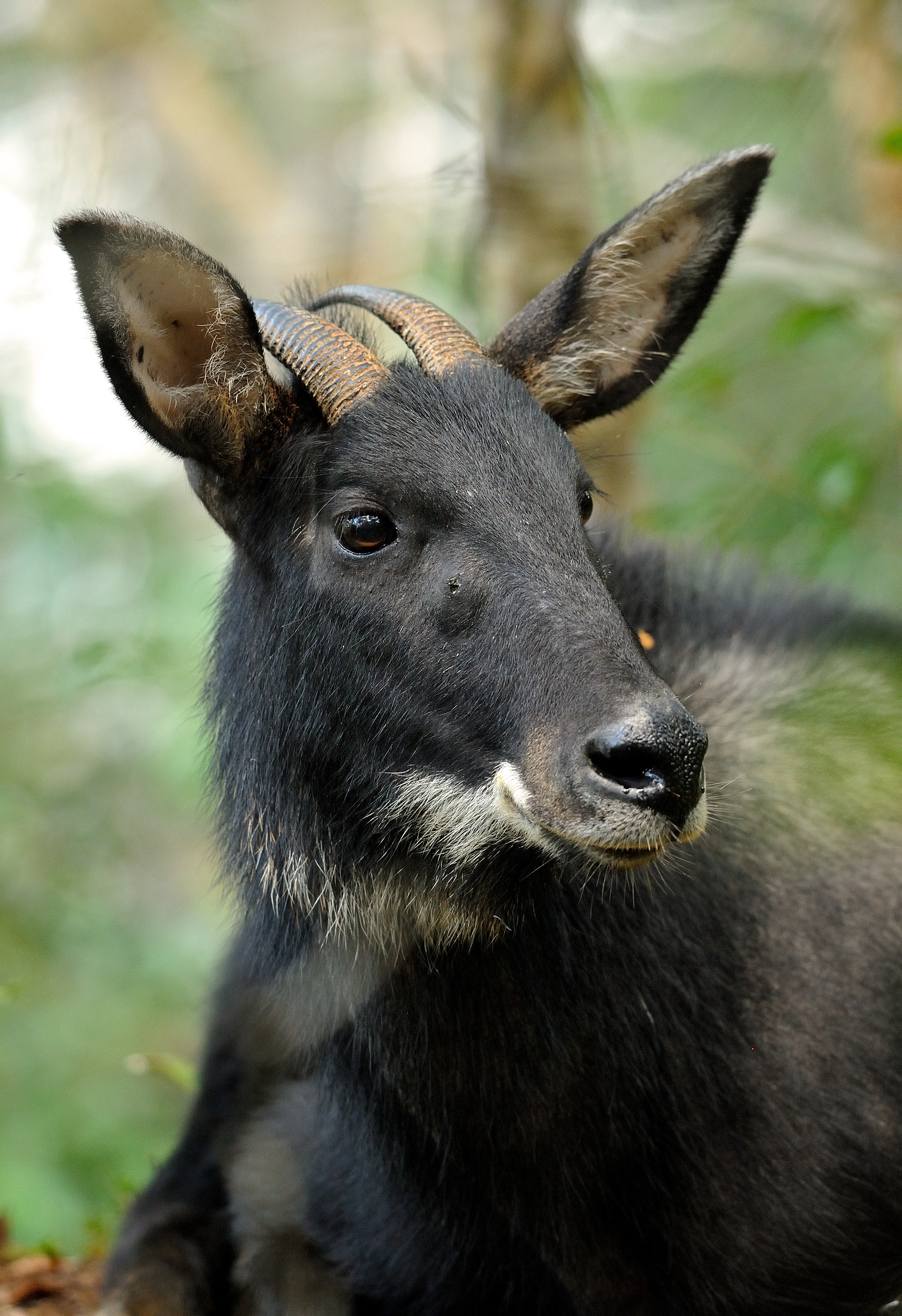

Conservation status
- Vulnerable (IUCN 2.3)

Scientific classification
- Domain: Eukaryota
- Kingdom: Animalia
- Phylum: Chordata
- Class: Mammalia
- Order: Artiodactyla
- Family: Bovidae
- Subfamily: Caprinae
- Genus: Capricornis
- Species: C. sumatraensis
- Subspecies: C. s. maritimus

Trinomial name
- Capricornis sumatraensis maritimus (Heude, 1888)

Synonyms
- Naemorhedus sumatraensis maritimus; Capricornis milneedwardsii maritimus

= Indochinese serow =

The Indochinese serow (Capricornis sumatraensis maritimus) is a vulnerable goat-antelope, a subspecies of the mainland serow, native to Cambodia, Laos, Myanmar, Thailand and Vietnam.

In Cambodia the Indochinese serow, known as សត្វកែះ /sat kɛh/, is restricted to the forests of the karstic mountain areas in Mondulkiri Province. The main threat in Cambodia comes from logging, hunting as well as landmines and other ordnance left by the conflict.
