= Étienne Aymonier =

French linguist and explorer

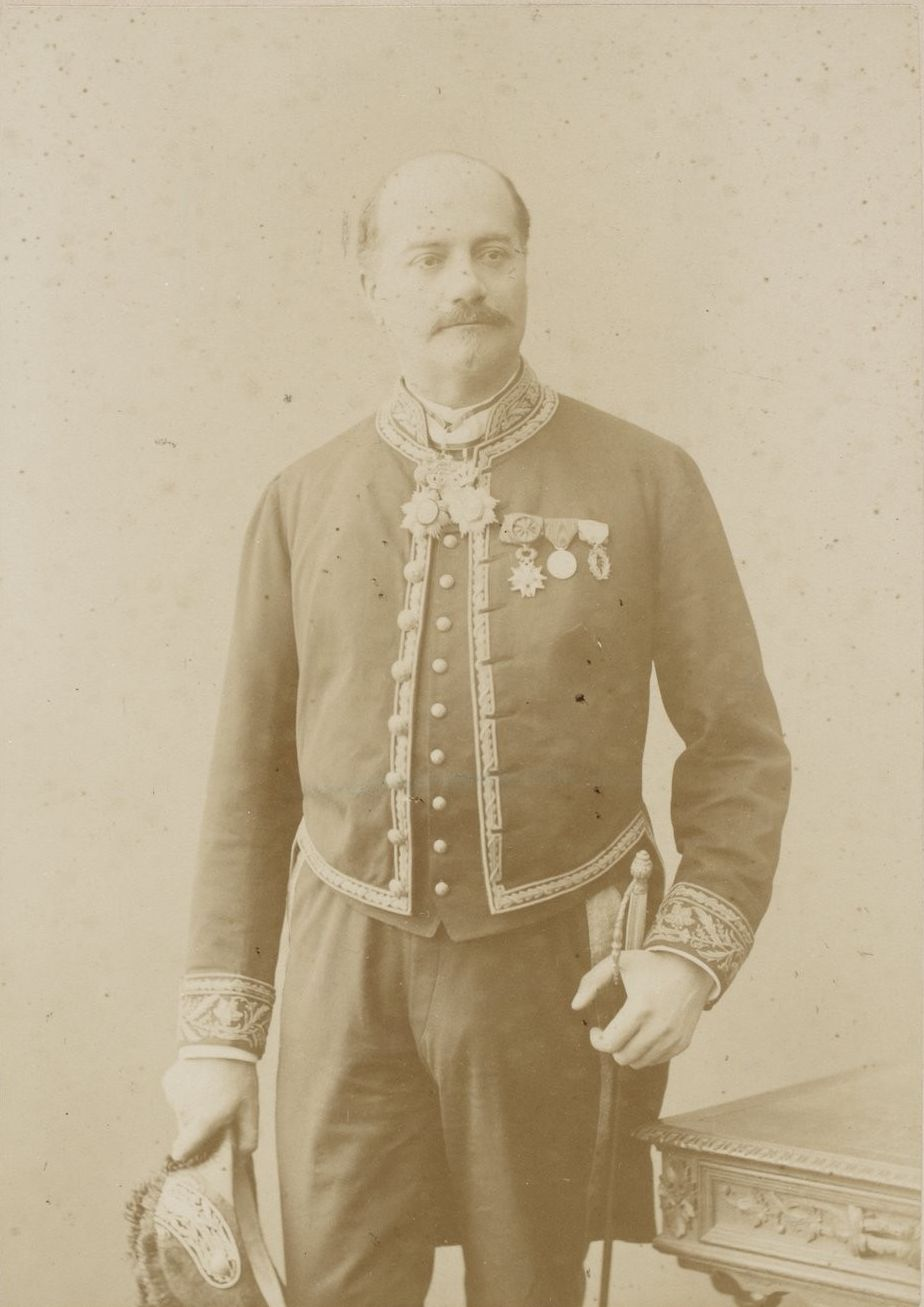
Étienne François Aymonier

Étienne François Aymonier (26 February 1844 – 21 January 1929) was a French linguist and explorer. He was the first archaeologist to systematically survey the ruins of the Khmer Empire in today's Cambodia, Thailand, Laos and southern Vietnam. His principal work was "Le Cambodge", published in three volumes from 1900 to 1904.

He was born in Le Châtelard, Savoie, France.

He served as acting French representative for the French protectorate of Cambodia from 6 January 1879 to 10 May 1881 and was the first director of the École Coloniale. He assembled a large collection of Khmer sculpture, which was later housed in the Guimet Museum in Paris. He also wrote books on the Cham language.

He died on 21 January 1929 at the age of 84.

== Legacy ==
The species Gyrinocheilus aymonieri (Siamese algae eater) commemorates his name.

== Works ==
- Etienne Aymonier; Antoine Cabaton (1906). Dictionnaire čam-français. Vol. 7 of Publications de l'École française d'Extrême-Orient. E. Leroux.
- Etienne Aymonier (1889). Grammaire de la langue chame. Imprimerie coloniale.
