= Ka Choung =

Waterfall in Ratanakiri, Cambodia

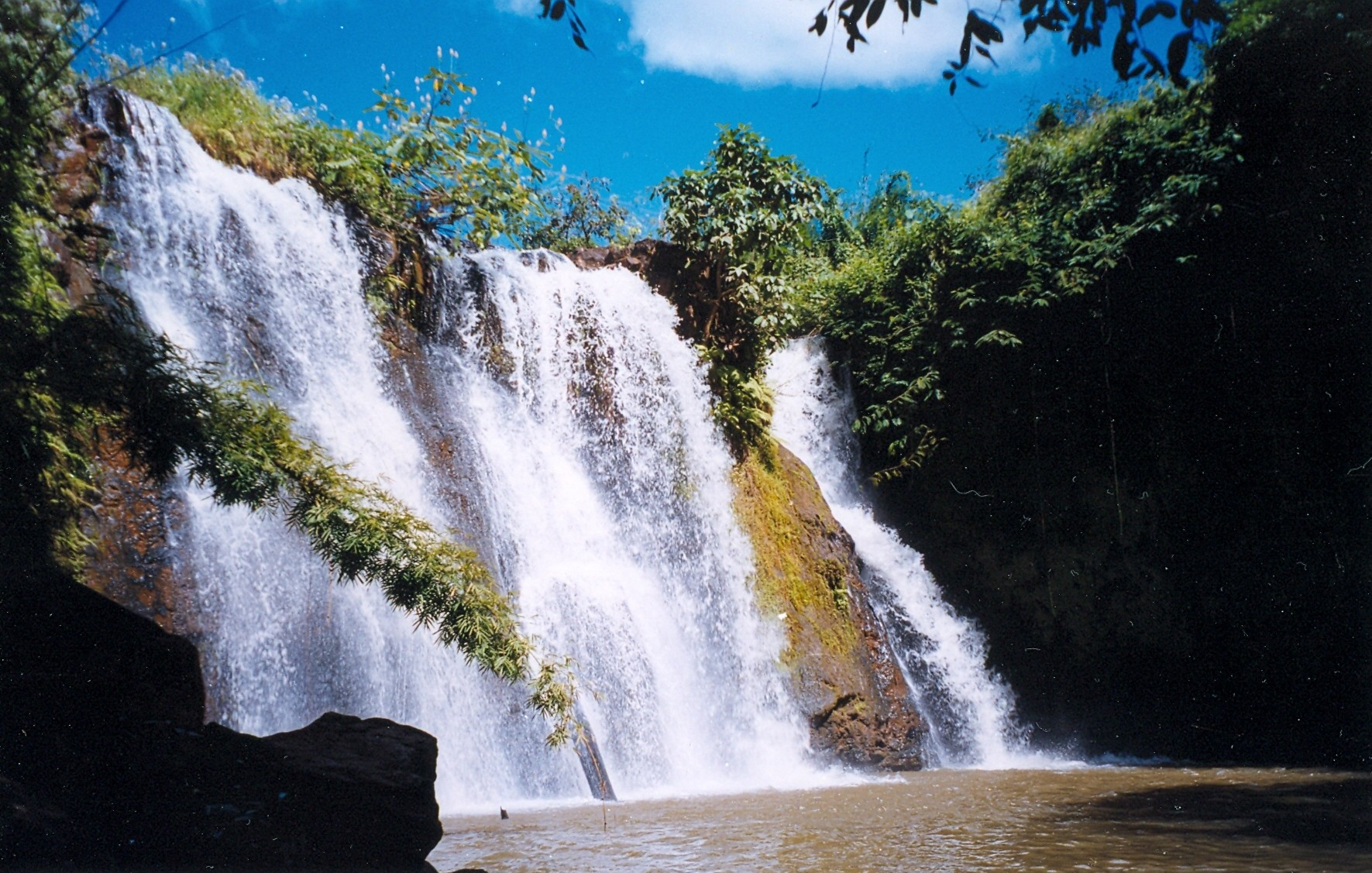
Ka Choung falls in December 1999

Ka Choung is a waterfall in Ratanakiri province in Cambodia. The falls are located in Ban Lung District about 7 kilometres north west of the provincial capital Banlung.

== See also ==
- List of waterfalls
