= Lake Yeak Laom =

- បឹងយក្សឡោម (Khmer)
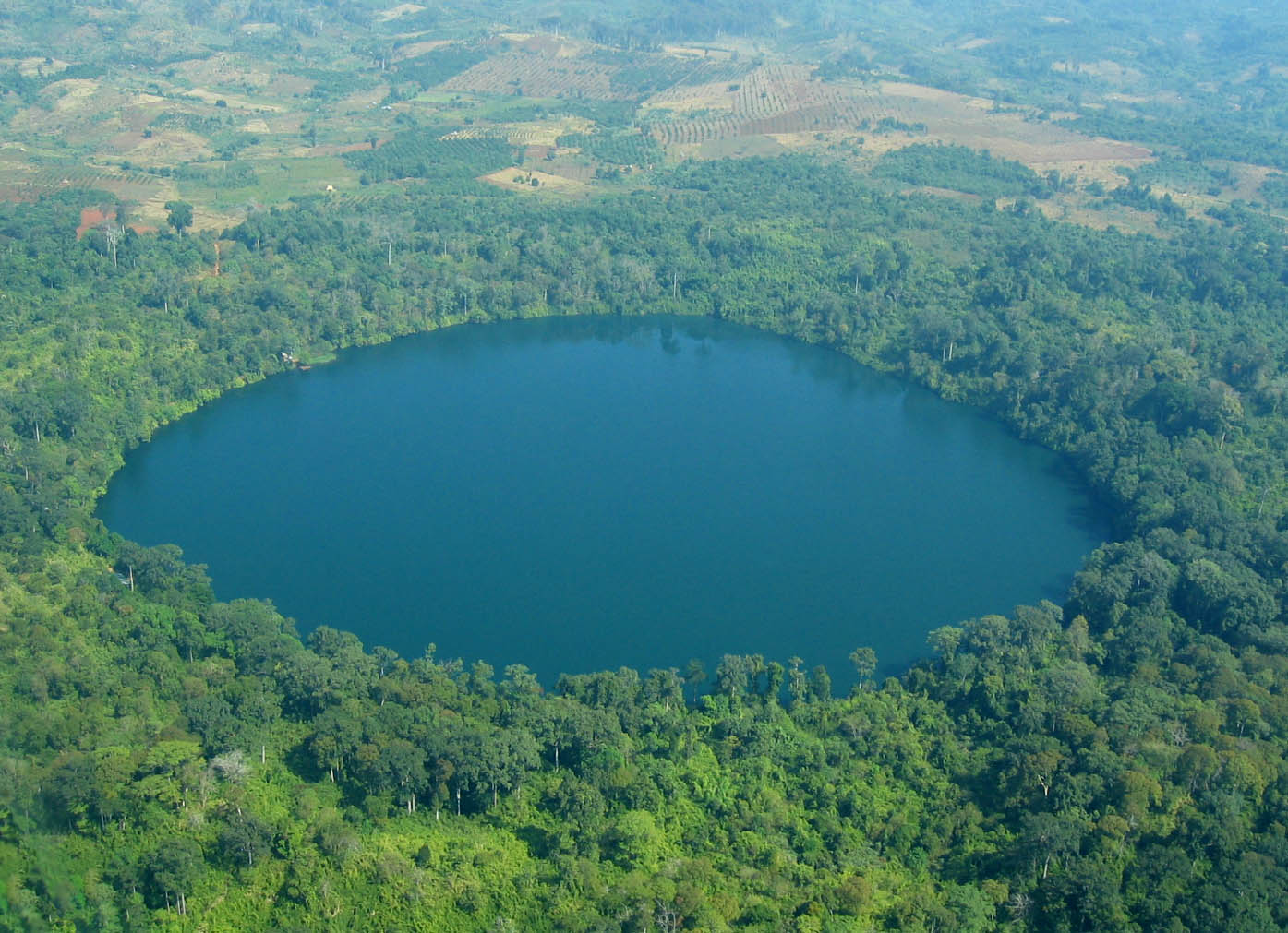
- Aerial view of Lake Yeak Laom in 2006

- Location within Cambodia
- Location: Ratanakiri, Cambodia
- Coordinates: 13.730°N 107.015°E
- Type: Volcanic crater lake
- Basin countries: Cambodia
- Max. length: 750 metres (2,460 ft)
- Max. width: 750 metres (2,460 ft)
- Surface area: 0.44 square kilometres (0.17 sq mi)
- Max. depth: 50 m (160 ft)

Lake Yeak Laom (Khmer: បឹងយក្សឡោម, Bœ̆ng Yôks Laôm [ɓəŋ jĕək laom]) is a volcanic crater lake and a tourist destination in the commune of Yeak Laom, Banlung Municipality, Ratanakiri Province, in north-eastern Cambodia. It is about 5 km south of Banlung town, the provincial capital, and is located in a protected area. In 2012, Lake Yeak Laom was selected among the 15 most beautiful crater lakes in the world.

== Geology ==
Around 700,000 years ago, a volcanic eruption resulted in the creation of the lake in Ratanakiri's mountain region. The shore of Yeak Laom Lake forms an almost perfect circle. It is 800 meters in diameter, and about 50 meters deep. Its shape and depth are due to its volcanic's origin.

== Local beliefs ==
The Tampuan folklore, the lake was formed by a giant digging a pit to retrieve his beautiful daughter from a suitor with whom she had run away. Rain filled the pit, creating the lake.

The lake and forest area have spiritual significance for the Tampuan people, who perform ritual offerings during harvesting, planting or family sickness.

== Climate ==
Banlung's rainy season occurs from May–October while it has dry periods from December–February. On average, the warmest month is April, and the coolest month is January. July is the wettest month while January is the driest.

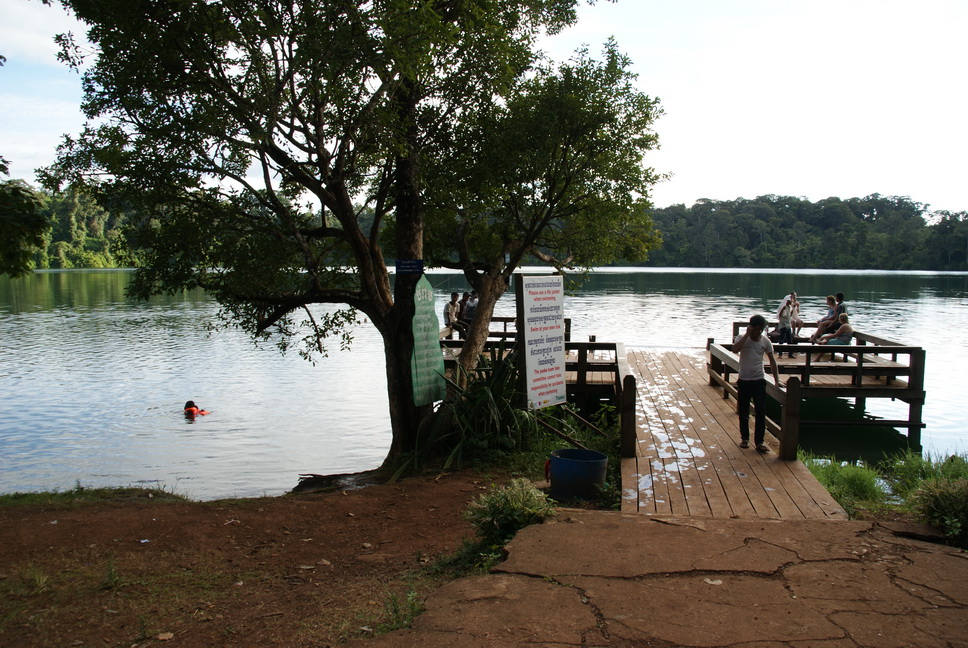
Sitting area around the lake

== Tourist activity ==
Yak Loam is a popular tourist destination, taking only 10 minutes by car or tuktuk from Banlung town. The lake is encircled by a ring of forest, and the clear emerald water is used for swimming, with life-jackets provided. A 3-kilometer path circles around the lake, with a small museum offering insight into Tampuan culture. Handicraft stores selling souvenirs made by the hill tribes living nearby are found at the entrance, and ethnic costumes can be hired for photo shoots. The hill tribes also sell fresh honey combs, rice wine, dried beef, wild fruits and other snacks. The entrance fee is $0.25 for Cambodian nationals and $2 for international visits. Food can be brought from outside, or purchase from stalls.

== Protected area and management ==
Before 1995, environmental impacts from litter and agricultural were increasing. That year, the provincial authority and the International Development Research Centre (UK) began environmental protection and education activities with the Tampuen community around the lake, with the community itself taking over the project in 1997.

The governor of Ratanakiri approved a 25-year agreement for the local Tampuen community to manage the lake and surrounding area. Indigenous land rights were explicitly included in land laws introduced in 2001. A Community Based Tourism Committee of ten elders was formed with one man and one woman from each of the five Tampuen villages in the area, with this committee overseeing activities with proceeds from the entry fee going back into supporting the community and the ongoing protection of the lake and the surrounding forest. Tampuen guides provide nature tours around the lake, and community members perform traditional dance to raise money for community development.

A 2018 sub decree from the Ministry of Environment established Boeng Yeak Laom Multiple Use Area covering 36.2 hectares, which includes the lake and the surrounding ring of forest.

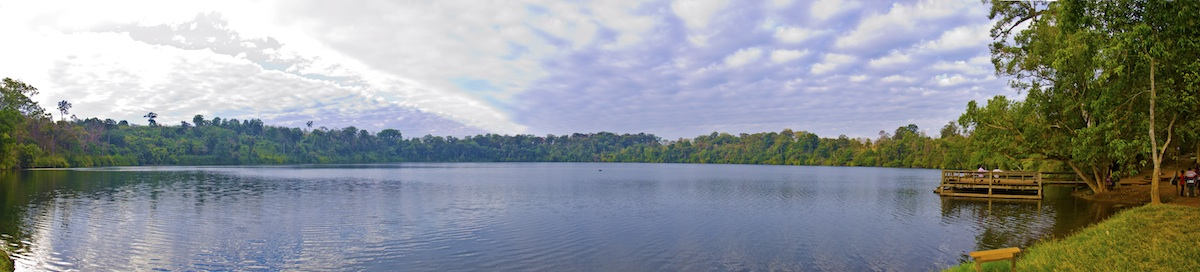
Panorama of Yeak Laom Lake.

== See also ==
- List of volcanoes in Cambodia
