= Ou Chum District =

Ou Chum អូរជុំ
- District
- Location in Cambodia
- Coordinates: 13.8407°N 107.0302°E
- Country: Cambodia
- Province: Ratanakiri
- Communes: Cha Ung, Chan/Puoy, Aekakpheap, Kalai, Ou Chum, Sameakki, L'ak

Area
  - Total: 530.98 km^{2} (205.01 sq mi)

Population (2019)
  - Total: 25,301
- Time zone: UTC+7 (Cambodia time)
- District code: 1406

Ou Chum (Khmer: អូរជុំ) is a district in Ratanakiri Province, Cambodia. The district center is located approximately 8 km (5.0 mi) from the provincial capital Banlung. It covers an area of approximately 530.98 km^{2} (205.01 sq mi) and had a population of 25,301 in 2019. It is subdivided into seven communes and 37 villages.

== Geography ==
Ou Chum is one of the nine districts (srok) of Ratanakiri province, Cambodia. It covers an area of approximately 530.98 km^{2} (205.01 sq mi), of which 260.63 km^{2} (100.63 sq mi) was forested, 139.47 km^{2} (53.85 sq mi) was classified as cultivation land, 1.46 km^{2} (0.56 sq mi) as construction land, and 129.42 km^{2} (49.97 sq mi) as other land in 2009. The district center is located approximately 8 km (5.0 mi) from the provincial capital Banlung. It is bordered by Ban Lung and Bar Kaev Districts to the south, Andoung Meas District to the east, Ta Veaeng District to the northeast, Koun Mom District to the west, and Veun Sai District to the northwest.

== Communes ==
The district is headed by a district governor. Lumphat district is subdivided into seven communes (khum)–Cha Ung, Pouy, Aekakpheap, Kalai, Ou Chum, Sameakki, and L'ak. The communes are administrated by a commune council headed by a commune chief elected directly for a five year period. The communes are further subdivided into 37 villages (phum), which are each headed by a village chief, appointed by the corresponding commune council. Cha Ung is located closest to the district administration at 2 km (1.2 mi), while L'ak is the farthest at 25 km (16 mi).

Commune	Villages	Population (1998)
Cha Ung	Char Ung Ket, Char Ung Chan, Phlay Ampil, Thuoy Tum, Char Ung Kao	1,733
Chan/Pouy	Chan, Kan Saeung, Kreh, Ta Ngach, Svay, Khmaeng, Krala, Kang Kuy	1,696
Aekakpheap	Pa Or, Pa Chon Thum, Oum, Krouch	1,752
Kalai	Kalai Muoy, Kalai Pir, Kalai Bei	820
Ou Chum	Ou Chum, Tharang Chong, Svay, L'eun Kreaeng, L'eun Chong, Tang Pleng, Tang Kamal, L'eun Kangmis	3,090
Sameakki	Ka Meaen, Prak, Ba Nhuk, Ping	1,424
L'ak	L'ak, Kralong, Kouk, Kam, Phum Pir	1,348

== Demographics ==
According to the 1998 census, Ou Chum District had a population of 11,863 including 5,737 males and 6,126 females. The district had 2,104 households, with an average household size of 5.6 persons. The population increased to 17,982 in 2008. As per the 2019 census, the population was 25,301, including 12,611 males and 12,690 females. The district had 5,718 households, with an average household size of 4.4 persons.

In 2008, 3,915 of the 3,951 families (approximately 99%) in the district were primarily engaged in agriculture, with 96% of families engaged in rice farming. The rest of the population was engaged in services (18 families) and trade (4 families).
