= Bar Kaev District =

Bar Kaev បាគាវ
- District
- Location in Cambodia
- Coordinates: 13.6927°N 107.2197°E
- Country: Cambodia
- Province: Ratanakiri

Area
  - Total: 506.26 km^{2} (195.47 sq mi)

Population (2019)
  - Total: 28,279
- Time zone: UTC+7 (GMT + 7)

Bar Kaev District (Khmer: បាគាវ) (also transliterated Bar Keo) is a district in Ratanakiri Province, Cambodia. It is located approximately 30 km (19 mi) from the provincial capital Banlung. It covers an area of approximately 506.26 km^{2} (195.47 sq mi), and had a population of 28,279 in 2019. It is subdivided into six communes and 34 villages.

== Geography ==
Bar Kaev is one of the nine districts (srok) of Ratanakiri province, Cambodia. It covers an area of approximately 506.26 km^{2} (195.47 sq mi), of which 189.16 km^{2} (73.04 sq mi) was forested, 129.62 km^{2} (50.05 sq mi) was classified as cultivation land, and 187.66 km^{2} (72.46 sq mi) as others. The district center is located approximately 30 km (19 mi) from the provincial capital Banlung. It is bordered by Andoung Meas District to the north, Ou Chum District to the northwest, Ban Lung District to the west, Lumphat District to the south, and Ou Ya Dav District to the east. The region had an elevation ranging from approximately 100 to 400 m (330 to 1,310 ft). It experiences a monsoon climate with annual rainfall of more than 200 cm (79 in).

The district is headed by a district governor. Bar Kaev district is subdivided into six communes (khum)–Kak, Ke Chong, Laming, Lung Khung, Seung, and Ting Chak. The communes are administrated by a commune council headed by a commune chief elected directly for a five year period. The communes are further subdivided into 34 villages (phum), which are each headed by a village chief, appointed by the corresponding commune council.

== Demographics ==
In 1998, the district had a population of 11,758, comprising 5,754 males and 6,004 females. The population increased to 19,953 in 2008. As per the 2019 census, the population was 28,279, including 14,189 males and 14,090 females. The district had 6,633 households, with an average household size of 4.3 persons.

In 2008, almost 99% of the families in the district were engaged in agriculture, with rice being the staple crop. The rest of the population was engaged in the service sector.
