= La Minh Commune =

La Minh Commune ឃុំឡាមីញ
- Commune
- Location within Cambodia
- Coordinates: 13°35′N 107°10′E
- Country: Cambodia
- Province: Ratanakiri Province
- District: Bar Kaev
- Villages: 5

Population (1998)
  - Total: 2,622
- Time zone: UTC+07

La Minh Commune (Khmer: ឃុំឡាមីញ) is a commune in Bar Kaev District in northeast Cambodia. It contains five villages and has a population of 2,622.

In the 2007 commune council elections, all five seats went to members of the Cambodian People's Party. Land alienation is a severe problem in Laming. (See Ratanakiri Province for background information on land alienation.)

== Villages ==
Village	Population (1998)	Sex ratio (male/female) (1998)	Number of households (1998)
Trom (ត្រុំ)	675	0.92	147
Su (ស៊ូ)	212	0.88	49
Nhal (or Nhol) (ញល)	328	0.91	67
Khmang (ខ្មាំង)	285	0.85	58
Phum Muoy (ភូមិ ១) and/or Phum Pram			
