= Ta Veaeng District =

District in Ratanakiri Province, Cambodia

Ta Veaeng តាវែង
- District
- Location in Cambodia
- Coordinates: 14°17′31″N 107°14′25″E
- Country: Cambodia
- Province: Ratanakiri

Area
  - Total: 2,284.65 km^{2} (882.11 sq mi)

Population (2019)
  - Total: 7,503
- Time zone: UTC+7 (ICT)
- Geocode: 1408

Ta Veaeng (Khmer: តាវែង; also transliterated Ta Veng) is a district in Ratanakiri Province, Cambodia. The district center is located approximately 49 km (30 mi) from the provincial capital Banlung. It covers an area of approximately 2,284.65 km^{2} (882.11 sq mi) and had a population of 7,503 in 2019. It is the largest district by area and the least populated in the province. It is subdivided into two communes and 20 villages.

== Geography ==
Ta Veaeng is one of the nine districts (srok) of Ratanakiri province, Cambodia. It covers an area of approximately 2,284.65 km^{2} (882.11 sq mi), and is the largest district by land area in the province.Of the total land area, 1,201.27 km^{2} (463.81 sq mi) was forested, 128.25 km^{2} (49.52 sq mi) was classified as cultivation land, 0.94 km^{2} (0.36 sq mi) as construction land, and 954.18 km^{2} (368.41 sq mi) as other land in 2009. The district center is located approximately 49 km (30 mi) from the provincial capital Banlung. It is bordered by Veun Sai District to the southwest, Ou Chum District to the south, and Andoung Meas District to the southeast. It is bordered by Laos to the north and Vietnam to the east.

The district is located in the Se San River basin, with 19 of its villages (phum) located along the river. The Virachey National Park extends across Ta Veaeng, Veun Sai, and Andoung Meas districts. The park is spread over 332,500 ha (822,000 acres), and was established in 1993. It was designated an ASEAN Heritage Park in 2003. In 2023, the park's protected area was expanded to approximately 405,766 ha (1,002,670 acres). The district has a tropical savanna climate as per the Köppen climate classification.

== Administration ==
The district is headed by a district governor. Ta Veaeng District is subdivided into two communes (khum)–Ta Veaeng Leu and Ta Veaeng Kraom. The communes are administrated by a commune council headed by a commune chief elected directly for a five year period. The communes are further subdivided into 20 villages (phum), which are each headed by a village chief, appointed by the corresponding commune council. The district office is located in Ta Veaeng Kraom and the office of Ta Veaeng Leu Commune is located approximately 8 km (5.0 mi) away.

Ta Veaeng Leu

Village	Population (1998)	Sex ratio	Number of households	Notes
Chan	145	0.71	32	
Chuoy	303	0.83	56	
Ta Bouk	288	0.97	53	
Bangket	232	0.98	47	
Sanh	137	1.32	32	
Ke Kuong	159	0.73	25	
Rieng Vinh	177	0.97	43	
Phlueu Thum	185	0.93	35	
Phlueu Touch	131	0.96	29	
Ta Veaeng	642	0.81	118	

Ta Veaeng Kraom

Village	Population (1998)	Sex ratio	Number of households	Notes
Tumpuon Reung Thum	372	1.02	69	
Kaoh Pong	34	1.27	8	
Sieng Say	178	0.78	26	
Pha Yang	207	1.07	44	
Keh Kuong Touch	106	1.3	19	
Ta Ngach	102	0.82	16	
Phav	480	0.85	75	
Tumpuon Reung Touch	156	1.14	28	
Vieng Chan	104	0.73	20	
Tun	187	0.99	54	

== Demographics ==
According to the 1998 census, Ta Veaeng District had a population of 4,325, comprising 2,399 people in Ta Veaeng Leu and 1,926 in Ta Veaeng Kraom. According to the 2008 census, the population was 5,835. As per the 2019 census, the population was 7,503, including 3,753 males and 3,750 females. It is the least populated district in the province. The district had 1,960 households, with an average household size of 3.8 persons.

In 2008, the district had 5,891 people belonging to indigenous ethnic groups, including 4,883 Brao, 880 Kreung, 116 Lun, six Kavet, four Kachok, and two Tampuan. Approximately 99% of families in the district were engaged primarily in agriculture, with 96% of the families engaged in rice cultivation. The rest of the families were engaged in services (1%) and trade (1%).
