= Lamming =

Lamming is a surname. Notable people with the surname include:

- David Lamming (1936–2010), English rugby league footballer
- George Lamming (1927–2022), Barbadian novelist, essayist, and poet
- R. M. Lamming (born 1948 or 1949), British writer

== See also ==
- Laming, surname
- Lamming Mills, former unincorporated community in British Columbia
