= BVB (Cambodia) =

- Company type: Private company
- Headquarters: Phnom Penh, Cambodia
- Area served: Cambodia
- Key people: Toch Bopha, Duong Vibol, Sin Bopha
- Subsidiaries: BVB Investment Ltd; Viriya BVB Insurance Plc; BVB Machinery Trading Co Ltd

BVB (Bopha Vibol) is a private company conglomerate based in Phnom Penh, Cambodia.

== BVB Investment Ltd ==
On 2 May, the Ratanakiri provincial governor granted a 1,250-acre (5.1 km^{2}), 90-year lease to BVB Investment to develop a tourist attraction site on Youl Mountain in Yeak Laom commune, Banlung District, including parts of the indigenous Phnom, Sill, and Lapo villages. According to a United States Department of State Human Rights Practices report, NGOs reported that much of the leased area may be eligible for registration as indigenous community land under the 2001 law. The affected indigenous communities were not involved in lease negotiations.

== Viriya BVB Insurance Plc ==
On Monday 6 April 2009, the Royal Government of Cambodia sold 75% of its shares in the formerly state owned CAMINCO insurance company for US$5.7 million. The Royal Government however, retains a 25% share in the company. The existence of the deal was not widely known. Cheam Yeap, the head of the National Assembly's banking and finance committee and a Cambodian People's Party MP, told the Phnom Penh Post that he knew nothing about it.

== BVB Machinery Trading Co Ltd ==
The BVB Machinery Trading Company is a machinery warehouse based on the National Road No 6A.

== See also ==
- Cambodian National Insurance Company
