= Andoung Meas District =

Andoung Meas អណ្តូងមាស
- District
- Location within Cambodia
- Coordinates: 13.8807°N 107.3474°E
- Country: Cambodia
- Province: Ratanakiri

Area
  - Total: 835.9 km^{2} (322.7 sq mi)

Population (2019)
  - Total: 17,617
- Time zone: UTC+7 (GMT + 7)

Andoung Meas District (Khmer: អណ្តូងមាស; "Well of Gold") is a district in Ratanakiri Province, Cambodia. It is located about 50 km (31 mi) east of the provincial capital Banlung, close to the Vietnam border. It covers an area of approximately 835.9 km^{2} (322.7 sq mi) and had a population of 17,617 in 2019. It is subdivided into three communes and 21 villages.

== Geography ==
Andoung Meas is one of the nine districts (srok) of Ratanakiri province. It covers an area of approximately 835.9 km^{2} (322.7 sq mi), of which 482.7 km^{2} (186.4 sq mi) was forested in 2009. The district is located about 50 km (31 mi) east of the provincial capital Banlung, close to the Vietnam border. It is bordered by Ta Veaeng District to the north, and Bar Kaev and Ou Chum Districts to the west, and Ou Ya Dav District to the south. It is located in the Se San River basin, with 11 of its 21 villages (phum) located along the river. The district has prospective copper and gold deposits.

The district is headed by a district governor. Andoung Meas district is subdivided into three communes (khum)–Malik, Nhang and Ta Lav. The communes are administrated by a commune council headed by a commune chief elected directly for a five year period. The communes are further subdivided into 21 villages (phum), which are each headed by a village chief, appointed by the corresponding commune council.

== Demographics ==
The district had a population of 6,896 in 1998, which increased to 10,365 in 2008. As per the 2019 census, the population was 17,617 including 8,840 males and 8,777 females. The district had 3,955 households, with an average household size of 4.5 persons.

In 2008, almost 98% of the families in the district were engaged in agriculture, with rice being the staple crop. The rest of the population was engaged in the service sector.
