= Ratanakiri Airport =

Airport in Ban Lung, Cambodia

- IATA: RBE; ICAO: VDRK

Summary
- Airport type: Public
- Serves: Ratanakiri Province, Cambodia
- Location: Ban Lung
- Coordinates: 13°43′55″N 106°59′01″E

Map
- Location of airport in Cambodia

Runways
| Direction | Length | | Surface |
| Direction | m | ft | Surface |
|---|---|---|---|
| 18/36 | 1,300 | 4,265 | Soil |

Statistics (?)
- Passenger movements: ?
- Airfreight movements in tonnes: ?
- Aircraft movements: ?

Ratanakiri Airport (IATA: RBE, ICAO: VDRK) is an airport occupying the western edge of Ban Lung town in Ratanakiri Province, Cambodia.

== History ==
Built in the 60's, the airport was operational until abandoned in the 70's due to war. It was rediscovered in the 90's by local airlines. In November 2005, there was a minor accident at Ratanakiri Airport when a plane arriving from Phnom Penh hit the side of the runway and ground looped, which caused the right hand main landing gear to collapse. The Y-7-100C aircraft was operated by PMT Air and leased from Royal Phnom Penh Airways. There were 59 passengers and 6 crew aboard at the time of the crash, but there were no fatalities. In the wake of this incident, and the more serious crash of PMTair Flight 241 in Kampot in July 2007, PMT Air ceased regular commercial flights to Ratanakiri. Since then, no commercial flights to Ban Lung are available and only chartered and private flights use the airport.
