= Malik, Cambodia =

Commune in Andoung Meas District, Ratanakiri, Cambodia

Malik ម៉ាលិក
- Commune
- Location within Cambodia
- Coordinates: 13°51′00″N 107°16′00″E
- Country: Cambodia
- Province: Ratanakiri
- District: Andoung Meas District

Population (1998)
  - Total: 1,440
- Time zone: UTC+07

Malik (Khmer: ម៉ាលិក) is a commune in Andoung Meas District in north-east Cambodia. It contains four villages and has a population of 1,440. In the 2007 commune council elections, all five seats went to members of the Cambodian People's Party. The land alienation rate in Malik was moderate as of January 2006.

== Villages ==
Village	Population (1998)	Sex ratio (male/female) (1998)	Number of households (1998)	Notes
Malik	417	214/203		
Katae	295	145/150		
Ka Hal	289	136/153		
Loum	439	233/206		
