= Ratanakiri (National Assembly constituency) =

National Assembly constituency of Cambodia

- National Assembly constituency
- Province: Ratanakiri
- Population: 217,453
- Major settlements: Banlung

Current constituency
- Created: 1993
- Seats: 1
- Member(s): Bou Lam

Ratanakiri (Khmer: រតនគិរី) is one of the 25 constituencies of the National Assembly of Cambodia. It is allocated 1 seat in the National Assembly.

== MPs ==
Election	MP (Party)
1993	Bou Thang (CPP)
1998	Bou Thang (CPP)
2003	Bou Thang (CPP)
2008	Bou Thang (CPP)
2013	Bou Thang (CPP)
2018	Bou Thang (CPP)
