= Kreh =

Kreh may refer to:

- Kreh, a village in Pouy in Cambodia
- KREH, a radio station in Texas, United States
