= Chrung =

Chrung may refer to:

- Chrung, a village in Kak Commune, Bar Kaev District, Cambodia
- Chrung, a village in Ke Chong Commune, Cambodia
