= Koun Mom District =

Koun Mom ស្រុកកូនមុំ
- District
- Location in Cambodia
- Coordinates: 3.5762°N 106.7677°E
- Country: Cambodia
- Province: Ratanakiri
- Communes: 6

Area
  - Total: 1,919.5 km^{2} (741.1 sq mi)

Population (2019)
  - Total: 30,810
- Time zone: UTC+7 (Cambodia time)
- District code: 1604

Koun Mom (Khmer: ស្រុកកូនមុំ) is a district in Ratanakiri Province, northeastern Cambodia. It covers an area of approximately 1,919.5 km^{2} (741.1 sq mi) and had a population of 30,810 in 2019. It is subdivided into six communes and 23 villages.

== Geography ==
Koun Mom is one of the nine districts (srok) of Ratanakiri province, Cambodia. It covers an area of approximately 1,919.5 km^{2} (741.1 sq mi), of which 1,646.43 km^{2} (635.69 sq mi) was forested, 151.6 km^{2} (58.5 sq mi) was classified as cultivation land, 8.8 km^{2} (3.4 sq mi) as construction land, and 112.67 km^{2} (43.50 sq mi) as other land in 2009. It is bordered by Veun Sai District to the north, Ban Lung and Ou Chum Districts to the northeast, Lumphat District to the east, Kaoh Nheaek District to the south, and Sesan District to the west.

The district is headed by a district governor. Koun Mom district is subdivided into six communes (khum)–Serei Mongkol, Srae Angkrong, Ta Ang, Teun, Trapeang Chres, and Trapeang Kraham. The communes are administrated by a commune council headed by a commune chief elected directly for a five year period. The communes are further subdivided into 23 villages (phum), which are each headed by a village chief, appointed by the corresponding commune council.

== Demographics ==
According to the 1998 population census, Koun Mom had a population of 8,814. The population increased to 15,505 in 2008. As per the 2019 census, the population was 30,810, including 15,693 males and 15,117 females. The district had 7,190 households, with an average household size of 4.3 persons.

In 2008, almost 96% of the families in the district were engaged in agriculture, with rice being the staple crop. The rest of the population was engaged in services (2%) and trade (1%).
