= O Chum 2 Hydropower Dam =

Dam in Ratanakiri, Cambodia

- Location within Cambodia
- Official name: O Chum 2 Hydropower Dam
- Country: Cambodia
- Location: Banlung, Ratanakiri province, Cambodia
- Coordinates: 13°46′20.4″N 106°59′14.3″E
- Opening date: 1992
- Owner: Cambodia Government

Dam and spillways
- Type of dam: Seasonal Storage
- Impounds: Lam Dom Noi River
- Height: 10 m (33 ft)
- Length: 107 m (351 ft)

Reservoir
- Creates: O Chum 2 Hydropower Dam Reservoir
- Catchment area: 45 km^{2} (17 sq mi)

Power Station
- Installed capacity: 1 MW (1,300 hp)
- Annual generation: 51 GWh (180 TJ)

O Chum 2 Hydropower Dam is located on O Chum River, in Banlung, Ratanakiri Province, Cambodia. O Chum 2, commissioned in 1993, is a 1 MW mini-hydropower plant located in the north-east of Ratanakiri province. It is owned and operated by the Cambodian government and has an estimated annual generation output of between 2.2 and 2.5 GWh.

The dam has the following characteristics:

- installed capacity 1 megawatt (1,300 hp)
- 51 gigawatt-hours (180 TJ) annually
- seasonal storage hydropower
- head 32.6 metres (107 ft)
- height 10 metres (33 ft)
- length 3,107 metres (10,194 ft)
- active storage 0.1 million cubic metres (3.5×10^{6} cu ft)
- catchment area 45 square kilometres (17 sq mi)

== See also ==
- Mekong
- Mekong River Commission
