= Pa Ar =

Pa Ar may refer to:

- Pa Ar, a village in Ke Chong commune, Bar Kaev district, Cambodia
- Pa Ar, a village in Pate commune, Ou Ya Dav district, Cambodia
