= Lumphat District =

Lumphat លំផាត់
- District
- Location in Cambodia
- Coordinates: 13°25′N 107°0′E
- Country: Cambodia
- Province: Ratanakiri
- Communes: 6

Area
  - Total: 1,209.9 km^{2} (467.1 sq mi)

Population (2019)
  - Total: 27,839
- Time zone: UTC+7 (Cambodia time)
- District code: 1605

Lumphat (Khmer: លំផាត់) is a district in Ratanakiri Province, northeastern Cambodia. It covers an area of approximately 1,209.9 km^{2} (467.1 sq mi) and had a population of 27,839 in 2019. It is subdivided into six communes and 26 villages.

== History ==
During the reign of Norodom Sihanouk, Lumphat served as the provincial capital of Ratanakiri, which was an outpost in northeastern part of the country. It suffered extensive damage during the Vietnam War. After the fall of the Khmer Rouge in 1979, Banlung became the capital of the Ratanakiri province.

== Geography ==
Lumphat is one of the nine districts (srok) of Ratanakiri province, Cambodia. It covers an area of approximately 1,209.9 km^{2} (467.1 sq mi), of which 770 km^{2} (300 sq mi) was forested, 410 km^{2} (160 sq mi) was classified as cultivation land, and 69 km^{2} (27 sq mi) as construction land in 2009. The district center is located approximately 30 km (19 mi) from the provincial capital Banlung. It is bordered by Ban Lung and Bar Kaev Districts to the north, Ou Ya Dav District to the east, Kaoh Nheaek District to the south, and Koun Mom District to the west.

== Administration ==
The district is headed by a district governor. Lumphat district is subdivided into six communes (khum)–Chey Otdam, Ka Laeng, La Bang Muoy, La Bang Pir, Pa Tang, and Seda. The communes are administrated by a commune council headed by a commune chief elected directly for a five year period. The communes are further subdivided into 26 villages (phum), which are each headed by a village chief, appointed by the corresponding commune council.

Commune	Villages	Population (1998)
Chey Otdam	Ou Kan, Srae Chhuk, Sam Kha, Dei Lou, Thmei, Lumphat	2,832
Ka Laeng	Says, Ka Laeng, Ka Nang Ket	1,026
La Bang Muoy	Kam Phlenh, Ka Tueng, Ka Tieng, Ka Lang	912
La Bang Pir	Ka Tieng, Ka Chanh	670
Pa Tang (Ba Tang)	Ul, Pruok, Pa Tang, Chang Rea	1,964
Seda	Thmei, Pa Tat, Kaeng San, Sakmotr Leu, Poum, Nang Hai, Sakmotr Kraom	2,897

== Demographics ==
According to the 1998 population census, Lumphat District had a population of 10,301 including 5,054 males and 5,247 females. The population increased to 18,975 in 2008. As per the 2019 census, the population was 27,839, including 14,099 males and 13,740 females. The district had 6,335 households, with an average household size of 4.4 persons.

In 2008, almost 98% of the families in the district were engaged in agriculture, with rice being the staple crop. The rest of the population was engaged in services (1%) and trade (1%).
