= Non-governmental organizations in Ratanakiri province =

There are several non-governmental organizations that operate in Ratanakiri Province, Cambodia.

NGO name	International/local	Notes
CIDSE	International	CIDSE began operating in Cambodia in 1979. The organization administers a community development program that aims to improve living conditions of the poor in a sustainable, community-based approach. They also work to strengthen local NGOs in the province.
DRC	International	DRC works on Mekong-related projects.
Japan International Volunteer Centre	International	The Japan International Volunteer Centre works on Mekong-related projects.
Oxfam HK	International	Oxfam HK works on Mekong-related projects.
Oxfam UK/I	International	Oxfam UK/I was one of the early NGOs in Cambodia. They operate a community development programme that comprises several projects, including microcredit, community organization, community-based natural resources management, health and sanitation, and education. They work with several local NGOs.
Overseas Service Bureau, Australia	International	The Overseas Service Bureau, Australia works on agriculture-related projects. They have one volunteer forester.
Voluntary Services Overseas	International	Voluntary Services Overseas works on education-related projects.
World Concern International	International	World Concern International works on education-related projects.
Catholic Office for Emergency Relief and Refugees	International	The Catholic Office for Emergency Relief and Refugees works on health-related projects and provides support to the provincial hospital.
Health Unlimited	International	Health Unlimited runs the Ratanakiri Primary Health Care Projects. These projects focus on improving community health, health centers, and the provincial health department and training health staff.
International Resources for the Improvement of Sight	International	International Resources for Improvement of Sight is an outreach eye care service project.
SAWA Cambodia	International	SAWA Cambodia is a Dutch NGO. It has been assigned by CARERE/UNDP to set up a Technical Support Unit under the Provincial Rural Development Committee.
World Concern Cambodia		World Concern Cambodia's projects focus on hilltribes and integrated community development.
Cambodian Human Rights and Development Association	Local	
