= Kalai, Cambodia =

Commune in Ou Chum District, Ratanakiri Province, Cambodia

Kalai កាឡៃ
- Commune
- Location within Cambodia
- Coordinates: 13°50′N 106°57′E
- Country: Cambodia
- Province: Ratanakiri Province
- District: Ou Chum District
- Villages: 3

Population (1998)
  - Total: 820
- Time zone: UTC+07
- Geocode: 160604

Kalai (Khmer: កាឡៃ) is a commune in Ou Chum District in north-east Cambodia. It contains three villages and had a population of 820 in 1998. In the 2007 commune council elections, all five seats went to members of the Cambodian People's Party. The NGO Forum on Cambodia reported in 2006 that the land alienation rate in Kalai was moderate. (See Ratanakiri Province for background information on land alienation.)

== Villages ==
Village	Population (1998)	Number of households (1998)	Sex ratio (male/female) (1998)	Notes
Kalai Muoy (កាឡៃ ១, Kalai 1)	217	42	0.99	
Kalai Pir (កាឡៃ ២, Kalai 2)	346	63	0.9	
Kalai Bei (កាឡៃ ៣, Kalai 3)	257	46	0.96	
