= Cambodian National Insurance Company =

- Company type: Private
- Industry: Insurance
- Founded: 1990
- Headquarters: Phnom Penh, Cambodia
- Area served: Siem Reap, Sihanoukville, Banteay Meanchey, Kampong Cham
- Key people: Duong Vibol, Managing Director
- Services: General, commercial, vehicle, home
- Net income: ▼US$ 100,000 (2008)
- Parent: Varyia BVB Insurance
- Website: caminco.com.kh

Cambodian National Insurance Company (CAMINCO) is a Cambodian private insurance company with 25% of its shares owned by the Royal Government of Cambodia. It is a subsidiary of Varyia BVB Insurance.

== History ==
CAMINCO was officially incorporated in 1990, becoming the first insurance company in Cambodia. It began its operations during June 1993.

In 2000, the Insurance Law was passed and in 2001, the Sub-decree Nº132 on Insurance came into force. As a result, CAMINCO restructured into a state owned enterprise. CAMINCO was able to meet the capital requirement of US$7 Millions, the insurance company to do so, and the only company to receive the 5-year license on General Insurance Services from the Ministry of Economy and Finance.

On Monday 6 April 2009, the Royal Government of Cambodia sold 75% of its shares in the formerly state owned CAMINCO insurance company for US$5.7 million. The Royal Government however, retains a 25% share in the company. The existence of the deal was not widely known. Cheam Yeap, the head of the National Assembly's banking and finance committee and a Cambodian People's Party MP, told the Phnom Penh Post that he knew nothing about it.

== Business partners ==
- Swiss Reinsurance Company
- Mitsui Sumitomo Insurance Company
- Tokio Marine & Fire Insurance
- Toa Reinsurance Company
- Korean Reinsurance Company
- S.A. Jean Verheyen
- Malaysian Reinsurance Berhad
- BEST RE
- General Insurance Corporation of India (GICI)
- Asian Reinsurance Corporation
- Ho Chi Minh City Insurance Company (Bao Minh)
- Professional Insurance Brokers

== See also ==
- BVB
