= Virachey National Park =

National park in Cambodia

- IUCN category II (national park)
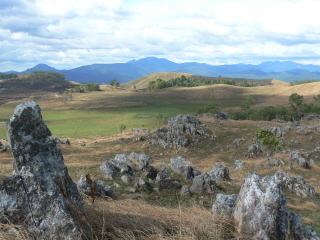
- Veal Thom grasslands

- Location within Cambodia
- Location: Ratanakiri Province, Cambodia
- Nearest city: Banlung
- Coordinates: 14.32569763°N 106.9981862°E
- Area: 3,380.57 km^{2} (1,305.25 sq mi)
- Established: 1993
- Governing body: Ministry of Environment

Virachey National Park (Khmer: ឧទ្យានជាតិវីរជ័យ) is a national park in north-eastern Cambodia covering an area of 3,380.57 km^{2} (1,305.25 sq mi).

The park is one of only two Cambodian ASEAN Heritage Parks. The park overlaps Ratanakiri and Stung Treng Provinces. The park's flora and fauna are threatened by illegal logging. The administration of the park is the responsibility of the Cambodian Ministry of Environment.

== Description ==
Located in some of the deepest and most isolated jungles of Cambodia, Virachey is largely unexplored and holds a large assortment of wildlife, waterfalls, and mountains. The park comprises dense semi-evergreen lowlands, montane forests, upland savannah, bamboo thickets, and occasional patches of mixed deciduous forest. Most of the area lies above 400 meters up to 1,500 meters.
