= Pao Ham Phan =

Cambodian politician

Pao Ham Phan (Vietnamese: Páo Hạm Phạn) was the governor of Ratanakiri Province, Cambodia, until his retirement in May 2014. As of 2017, he is a Secretary of State at the Ministry of the Interior.

In 1997, he was deputy governor. He is a member of the central committee of the Cambodian People's Party, the ruling party of Cambodia.
