= List of volcanoes in Cambodia =

This is a list of active, dormant and extinct volcanoes in Cambodia.

Name	Elevation		Location	Last eruption
Name	meters	feet	Coordinates	Last eruption
Yak Loum	-	-	13.730°N 107.015°E	-
