= Aekakpheap =

Aekakpheap ឯកភាព
- Commune
- Location within Cambodia
- Coordinates: 13°45′35″N 107°06′02″E
- Country: Cambodia
- Province: Ratanakiri Province
- District: Ou Chum District
- Villages: 4

Population (1998)
  - Total: 1,752
- Time zone: UTC+07
- Geocode: 160603

Aekakpheap (Khmer: ឯកភាព) is a commune in Ou Chum District in northeast Cambodia. It contains four villages and had a population of 1,752 in 1998. In the 2007 commune council elections, all five seats went to members of the Cambodian People's Party. The NGO Forum on Cambodia reported in 2006 that the land alienation rate in Aekakpheap was severe. (See Ratanakiri Province for background information on land alienation.)

== Villages ==
Village	Population (1998)	Number of households (1998)	Sex ratio (male/female) (1998)	Notes
Pa Chon Thum	785	95	0.99	
Pa Ao	404	66	0.87	
Oum	193	30	0.82	
Krouch	370	69	0.87	
