= Sameakki =

Sameakki ឃុំសាមគ្គី
- Commune
- Location within Cambodia
- Coordinates: 13°49′24″N 107°07′39″E
- Country: Cambodia
- Province: Ratanakiri Province
- District: Ou Chum District
- Villages: 4

Population (1998)
  - Total: 1,424
- Time zone: UTC+07
- Geocode: 160606

Sameakki (Khmer: ឃុំសាមគ្គី) is a commune in Ou Chum District in north-east Cambodia. It contains four villages and had a population of 1,424 in 1998. In the 2007 commune council elections, all five seats went to members of the Cambodian People's Party. The NGO Forum on Cambodia reported in 2006 that the land alienation rate in Sameakki was severe. (See Ratanakiri Province for background information on land alienation.)

== Villages ==
Village	Khmer name	Population (1998)	Number of households (1998)	Sex ratio (male/female) (1998)	Notes
Ka Meaen	កាមែន	552	89	0.91	
Prak	ប្រាក់	354	74	1	
Nha (Bha Nhuk)	ញ៉ុ	348	58	1.12	
Ping	ពីង	170	28	0.93	
