= Cha Ung =

Commune in Ou Chum District, Ratanakiri, Cambodia

Cha Ung ចាអ៊ុង
- Commune
- Location within Cambodia
- Coordinates: 13°45′34″N 106°55′49″E
- Country: Cambodia
- Province: Ratanakiri
- District: Ou Chum District
- Villages: 5

Population
  - Total: 1,733
- Time zone: UTC+07
- Geocode: 160601

Cha Ung (Khmer: ចាអ៊ុង) is a commune in Ou Chum District in north-east Cambodia. It contains Char Ung Ket, Char Ung Chan, Phlay Ampil, Thuoy Tum, Char Ung Kao villages and has a population of 1,733. In the 2007 commune council elections, all five seats went to members of the Cambodian People's Party. The land alienation rate in Cha Ung was moderate as of January 2006. (See Ratanakiri Province for background information on land alienation.)

== Villages ==
Village	Population (1998)	Sex ratio (male/female) (1998)	Number of households (1998)	Notes
Char Ung Ket	177	42	0.90	
Char Ung Chan	354	80	0.92	
Phlay Ampil	556	131	0.99	
Thuoy Tum	208	60	0.79	
Cha Ung Kau	438	79	0.90	
