= Ou Chum (commune) =

Ou Chum អូរជុំ
- Commune
- Location within Cambodia
- Coordinates: 13°48′N 107°00′E
- Country: Cambodia
- Province: Ratanakiri Province
- District: Ou Chum District
- Villages: 8

Population (1998)
  - Total: 3,090
- Time zone: UTC+07
- Geocode: 160605

Ou Chum (Khmer: អូរជុំ) is a commune in Ou Chum District in north-east Cambodia. It contains eight villages and had a population of 3,090 in 1998. In the 2007 commune council elections, all five seats went to members of the Cambodian People's Party. The NGO Forum on Cambodia reported in 2006 that the land alienation rate in Ou Chum was high. (See Ratanakiri Province for background information on land alienation.)

== Villages ==
| Village | Khmer name | Population (1998) | Number of households (1998) | Sex ratio (male/female) (1998) | Notes |
|---|---|---|---|---|---|
| Ou Chum | អូរជុំ | 733 | 112 | 1.12 | |
| Tharang Chong | ថារ៉ងជង | 542 | 95 | 0.95 | |
| Tharang Svay | ថារ៉ងស្វាយ | 417 | 67 | 0.96 | |
| L'eun Kraen | ល្អឺនក្រែន | 300 | 46 | 0.89 | |
| L'eun Chong | ល្អឺនជង | 254 | 35 | 0.94 | |
| Tang Pleng | តងប្លេង | 240 | 38 | 0.95 | |
| Tang Kamal | តងកាម៉ាល់ | 326 | 57 | 0.86 | |
| L'eun Kang Mis | ល្អឺនកាំមីស | 278 | 43 | 0.96 | |
