= Lung Khung =

Commune in Bar Kaev District, Ratanakiri Province, Cambodia

Lung Khung លុងឃុង
- Commune
- Location within Cambodia
- Coordinates: 13°38′N 107°8′E
- Country: Cambodia
- Province: Ratanakiri Province
- District: Bar Kaev
- Villages: 4

Population (1998)
  - Total: 1,828
- Time zone: UTC+07

Lung Khung (Khmer: លុងឃុង) is a commune in Bar Kaev District in northeast Cambodia. It contains four villages and has a population of 1,828. In the 2007 commune council elections, all five seats went to members of the Cambodian People's Party. Land alienation is a problem of moderate severity in Lung Khung. (See Ratanakiri Province for background information on land alienation.)

== Villages ==
Village	Population (1998)	Sex ratio (male/female) (1998)	Number of households (1998)
Lung Khung	998	0.87	213
Pa Ar	383	0.95	84
Pa Yang	297	0.98	56
Chreak	146	0.90	32

In addition to the four villages listed above, the census recorded one household of four people outside the villages.
