= Pouy (commune) =

Commune in Ou Chum District, Ratanakiri, Cambodia

Pouy ប៉ូយ
- Commune
- Location within Cambodia
- Coordinates: 13°54′42″N 107°01′57″E
- Country: Cambodia
- Province: Ratanakiri
- District: Ou Chum District
- Villages: 8

Population (1998)
  - Total: 1,696
- Time zone: UTC+07
- Geocode: 160602

Pouy (Khmer: ប៉ូយ) is a commune in Ou Chum District in north-east Cambodia. It contains Chan, Kan Saeung, Kreh, Ta Ngach, Svay, Khmaeng, Krala, Kang Kuy villages and has a population of 1,696. In the 2007 commune council elections, all five seats went to members of the Cambodian People's Party. The land alienation rate in Pouy was low as of January 2006. (See Ratanakiri Province for background information on land alienation.)

== Villages ==
Village	Population (1998)	Number of households (1998)	Sex ratio (male/female) (1998)	Notes
Chan	159	24	0.75	
Kan Saeung	260	55	0.74	
Kreh	163	24	0.99	
Ta Ngach	146	29	0.8	
Khlung	173	41	0.92	
Khmaeng	315	56	0.94	
Krala	317	55	0.91	
Svaay	163	36	0.83	
