= David Lamming =

English rugby league coach (1936–2010)

Personal information
- Full name: David W. Lamming
- Born: first ¼ 1936; Lupset?, Wakefield district, England
- Died: 2010 (aged 73–74)

Playing information
- Position: Loose forward
Club
| Years | Team | Pld | T | G | FG | P |
|---|---|---|---|---|---|---|
| 1954–62 | Wakefield Trinity | 113 | 23 | 0 | 0 | 69 |

Coaching information
Club
| Years | Team | Gms | W | D | L | W% |
| 1984–85 | Wakefield Trinity |

David W. Lamming (first ¼ 1936 – 2010) was an English professional rugby league footballer who played in the 1950s and 1960s, and coached in the 1980s. He played at club level for Wakefield Trinity (Juniors), and Wakefield Trinity, as a loose forward, and coached at club level for Wakefield Trinity.

== Background ==
David Lamming's birth was registered in Wakefield district, West Riding of Yorkshire, England, and he died aged 73–74.

== Playing career ==
David Lamming signed for Wakefield Trinity during December 1953, he made his début for Wakefield Trinity during April 1954, and he played his last match for Wakefield Trinity during the 1961–62 season.

== Contemporaneous Article Extract ==
"Outlines - On David Lamming Our spotlight again falls upon one of the many local products in our present side; one whose promise was seen in schoolboy football and developed in our own "nursery" teams. David Lamming's career began at Snapethorpe School, and it was soon evident that he was a "natural" loose-forward. He was a regular choice for the Wakefield City team and his work with them gained recognition by the County. He represented Yorkshire Boys against Cumberland and Lancashire. He came to Belle Vue, and was brought along in our own Trinity Juniors team, and from there he was signed in December, 1953. After a number of "A" team appearances he made his senior début against Keighley on April 10, 1954. He was then eighteen, and although there were only two other senior appearances for him that term, he was brought along gradually into senior company during the next campaign and shared selection at loose-forward with Colin Clifft. Unfortunately, just when he had gained permanent selection in our senior ranks, he was called away on National Service with the Army. This meant, a complete season from our first team but, on his return in 1958, he was soon in action again, and made 21 appearances. Around this time, however, Trinity's pack was being strengthened with experienced internationals. For Lamming it meant that a new challenge had to begin; and he was young enough and keen enough to accept this in the right spirit. He has come back to be a regular contender for a pack berth and, at the same time, his talents at loose-forward have been valuable when called in to deputise for Derek Turner when Trinity's captain has had international calls. He is now nearing his century of appearances for the first team and there is proof there of the experience he has gained in these recent years. he is still only 24 years of age; young enough to be one of the forwards on which Trinity's future is to be built, and with the ability for that to be done confidently. His career, in fact can hold much for the seasons ahead."

Sporting positions
| Preceded by Geoffrey Wraith; 1984 | Coach Wakefield Trinity; 1984-1985 | Succeeded by Len Casey; 1985-1986 |
