= Land alienation in Ratanakiri province =

Social problem in Cambodia

Despite a 2001 law allowing indigenous communities to obtain collective title to traditional lands, land alienation has been a major problem in Ratanakiri Province, Cambodia; some villages have been left nearly landless. The national government has granted concessions over land traditionally possessed by Ratanakiri's indigenous peoples, and even land "sales" have often involved bribes to officials, coercion, threats, or misinformation. For instance, a group of Ratanakiri villagers in 2001 were given salt and promises of development by military representatives in exchange for thumbprinting documents that—unbeknownst to them—transferred ownership of their ancestral lands to a military general. Following the involvement of several international NGOs, land alienation has decreased in frequency. These NGOs have assisted in the training of provincial government officials, promoting understanding of indigenous community concerns as well as encouraging dialog between the provincial and national governments. Pilot communal land titling projects have aimed to give legal force to traditional land ownership. Community natural resource management initiatives in Ratanakiri have been successful and have served as models for similar programs on a national level.
