= Yeak Laom =

Coordinates: 13°45′N 107°01′E

Yeak Laom យក្សឡោម
- Commune
- Interactive map of Yeak Laom
- Country: Cambodia
- Province: Ratanakiri
- Municipality: Banlung

Population (1998)
  - Total: 1,855
- Time zone: UTC+7 (ICT)

Yeak Laom (Khmer: យក្សឡោម) is a commune (khum) in the Banlung Municipality of the Ratanakiri Province in northeastern Cambodia. It has a population of 1,855.

On May 2, 2008, the Ratanakiri provincial governor granted a 1,250-acre (5.1 km^{2}), 90-year lease to BVB Investment to develop a tourist attraction site on Youl Mountain in the commune including parts of the indigenous Phnom, Sil, and Lapo villages. NGOs reported that much of the leased area may be eligible for registration as indigenous community land under the 2001 law. The affected indigenous communities were not involved in lease negotiations.

== Villages ==
Village	Population		
Village	Males	Females	Total
Lon	199	225	424
Phnum	101	96	197
Sil	139	149	288
La Pou	299	312	611
Chri	174	161	335
