= Keh Chong Commune =

Keh Chong Commune ឃុំកិះចុង
- Commune
- Location within Cambodia
- Coordinates: 13.8°N 107.3°E
- Country: Cambodia
- Province: Ratanakiri Province
- District: Bar Kaev
- Villages: 9

Population (1998)
  - Total: 2,415
- Time zone: UTC+07
- Geocode: 160302

Keh Chong (Khmer: ឃុំកិះចុង) is a commune in Bar Kaev District in northeast Cambodia. It contains nine villages and has a population of 2,415. In the 2007 commune council elections, four of its seats went to the Cambodian People's Party and one went to the Sam Rainsy Party. Land alienation is a problem of moderate severity in Ke Chong. (See Ratanakiri Province for background information on land alienation.)

== Villages ==
Village	Population (1998)	Sex ratio (male/female) (1998)	Number of households (1998)
Reu Han	315	1.02	48
Reu Khun	337	0.86	52
Krieng	417	0.97	67
Dal	250	0.94	38
Pa Ar	321	0.90	34
Paa Le	223	1.08	23
Ray	233	0.86	29
Chrung	264	1.06	32
Sa Lev	55	1.04	8
