= Laming =

Laming is a surname. Notable people with the surname include:

- Annette Laming-Emperaire (1917–1977), French archeologist
- Andrew Laming (born 1966), Australian medical doctor and former politician
- Bruce Laming (1938–2017), Australian Liberal Party politician in the Queensland parliament
- Frank Laming (1908–1989), Anglican priest
- Herbert Laming, Baron Laming (born 1936), British social worker and member of the House of Lords
- Marc Laming, British illustrator and designer
- Richard Laming (c. 1798–1879), British surgeon, natural philosopher, inventor, chemist, and industrialist

== See also ==
- Laming Worthington-Evans (1868–1931), British Conservative politician
- Sankt Katharein an der Laming, former municipality in the district of Bruck-Mürzzuschlag in Styria, Austria
