= Ratanakiri province =

Province of Cambodia

Ratanakiri Province ខេត្តរតនគិរី
- Province

Khmer transcription(s)
  - Khmer: ខេត្តរតនគិរី
  - UNGEGN: Khaet Roătănă Kĭri
  - ALA-LC: Khett Ratana Girī
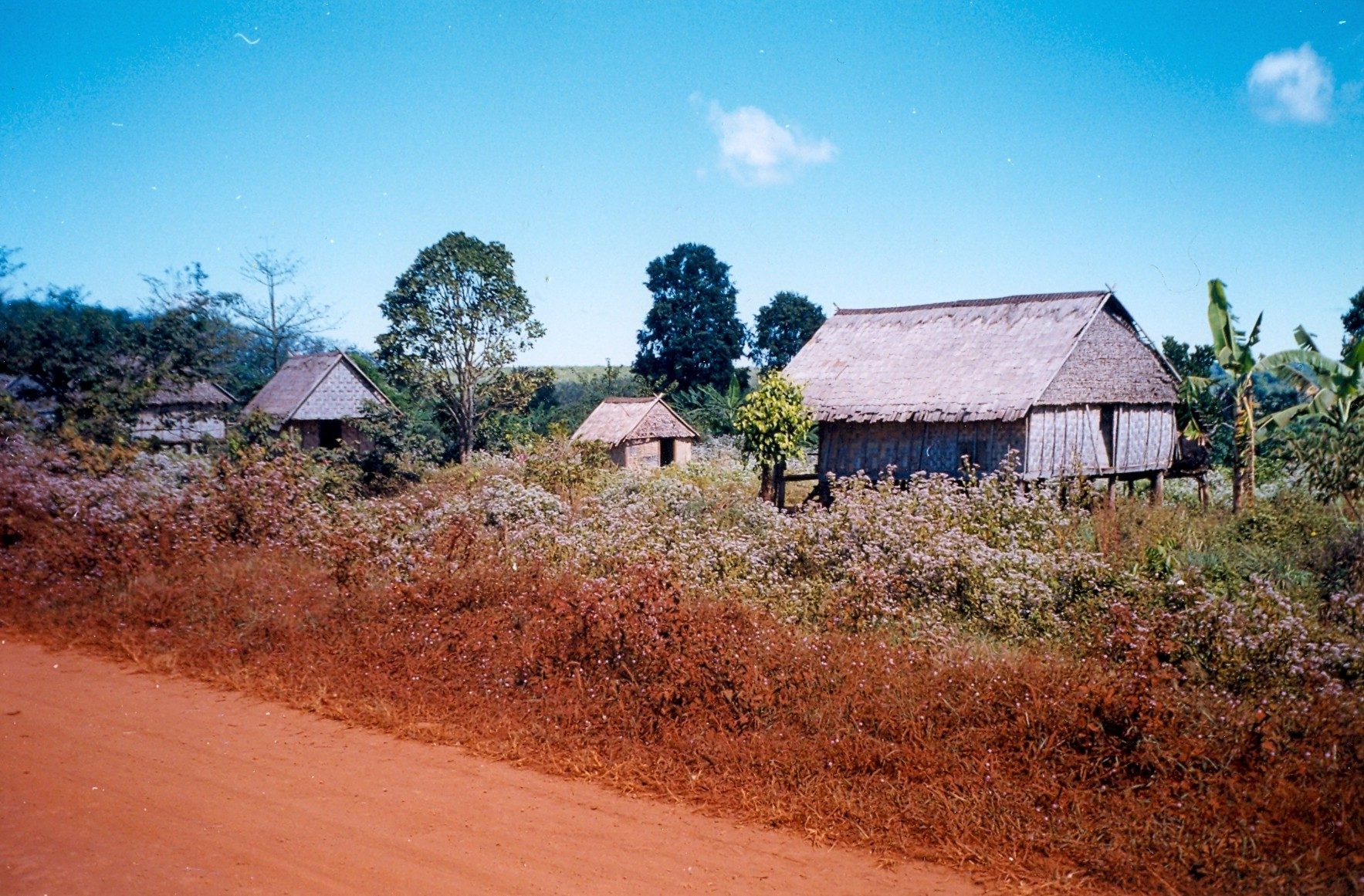
- Ratanakiri countryside

- Seal

- Location of Ratanakiri in Cambodia
- Coordinates: 13°44′N 107°0′E
- Country: Cambodia
- Established: 1959
- Capital: Banlung
- Subdivisions: 1 municipality; 8 districts

Government
  - Governor: Nhem Samoeurn (CPP)
  - National Assembly: 1 / 125

Area
  - Total: 10,782 km^{2} (4,163 sq mi)
  - Rank: 9th

Population (2024)
  - Total: ▼235,852
  - Rank: 19th
  - Density: 19/km^{2} (49/sq mi)
  - Rank: 21st
- Time zone: UTC+07:00 (ICT)
- Website: www.ratanakiri.gov.kh

Ratanakiri Province (Khmer: រតនគិរី, Khaet Roătănă Kĭri, [rŏət.ta.na ki.riː]; lit. 'crystal mountains') is a province of northeast Cambodia. It borders the provinces of Mondulkiri to the south and Stung Treng to the west and the countries of Laos (Attapeu in Khmer Language is Ach Krapeu) and Vietnam (Gia Lai and Quảng Ngãi) to the north and east, respectively. The province extends from the mountains of the Annamite Range in the north, across a hilly plateau between the Tonlé San and Tonlé Srepok rivers, to tropical deciduous forests in the south. In recent years, logging and mining have scarred Ratanakiri's environment, long known for its beauty.

For over a millennium, Ratanakiri has been occupied by the highland Khmer Loeu people, who are a minority elsewhere in Cambodia. During the region's early history, its Khmer Loeu inhabitants were exploited as slaves by neighboring empires. The slave trade economy ended during the French colonial era, but a harsh Khmerization campaign after Cambodia's independence again threatened Khmer Loeu ways of life. The Khmer Rouge built its headquarters in the province in the 1960s, and bombing during the Vietnam War devastated the region. Today, rapid development in the province is altering traditional ways of life.

Ratanakiri is sparsely populated; its 184,000 residents make up just over 1% of the country's total population. Residents generally live in villages of 20 to 60 families and engage in subsistence shifting agriculture. Ratanakiri is among the least developed provinces of Cambodia, though development indicators have been improving rapidly. Its infrastructure is poor, and the local government is weak.

== History ==
Ratanakiri has been occupied since at least the Stone or Bronze Age, and trade between the region's highlanders and towns along the Gulf of Thailand dates to at least the 4th century A.D. The region was invaded by Annamites, the Cham, the Khmer, and the Thai during its early history, but no empire ever brought the area under centralized control. From the 13th century or earlier until the 19th century, highland villages were often raided by Khmer, Lao, and Thai slave traders. The region was conquered by local Laotian rulers in the 18th century and then by the Thai in the 19th century. The area was incorporated into French Indochina in 1893, and colonial rule replaced slave trading. The French built huge rubber plantations, especially in Labansiek (present-day Banlung); indigenous workers were used for construction and rubber harvesting. While under French control, the land comprising present-day Ratanakiri was transferred from Siam (Thailand) to Laos and then to Cambodia. Although highland groups initially resisted their colonial rulers, by the end of the colonial era in 1953 they had been subdued.

Ratanakiri Province was created in 1959 from land that had been the eastern area of Stung Treng Province. The name Ratanakiri (រតនគិរី) is formed from the Khmer words រតនៈ (roătănă, lit. 'crystal', from Sanskrit ratna) and គិរី (kĭri, lit. 'mountain', from Sanskrit giri), describing two features for which the province is known. During the 1950s and 1960s, Norodom Sihanouk instituted a development and Khmerization campaign in northeast Cambodia that was designed to bring villages under government control, limit the influence of insurgents in the area, and "modernize" indigenous communities. Some Khmer Loeu were forcibly moved to the lowlands to be educated in Khmer language and culture, ethnic Khmer from elsewhere in Cambodia were moved into the province, and roads and large rubber plantations were built. After facing harsh working conditions and sometimes involuntary labor on the plantations, many Khmer Loeu left their traditional homes and moved farther from provincial towns. In 1968, tensions led to an uprising by the Brao people in which several Khmer were killed. The government responded harshly, torching settlements and killing hundreds of villagers.

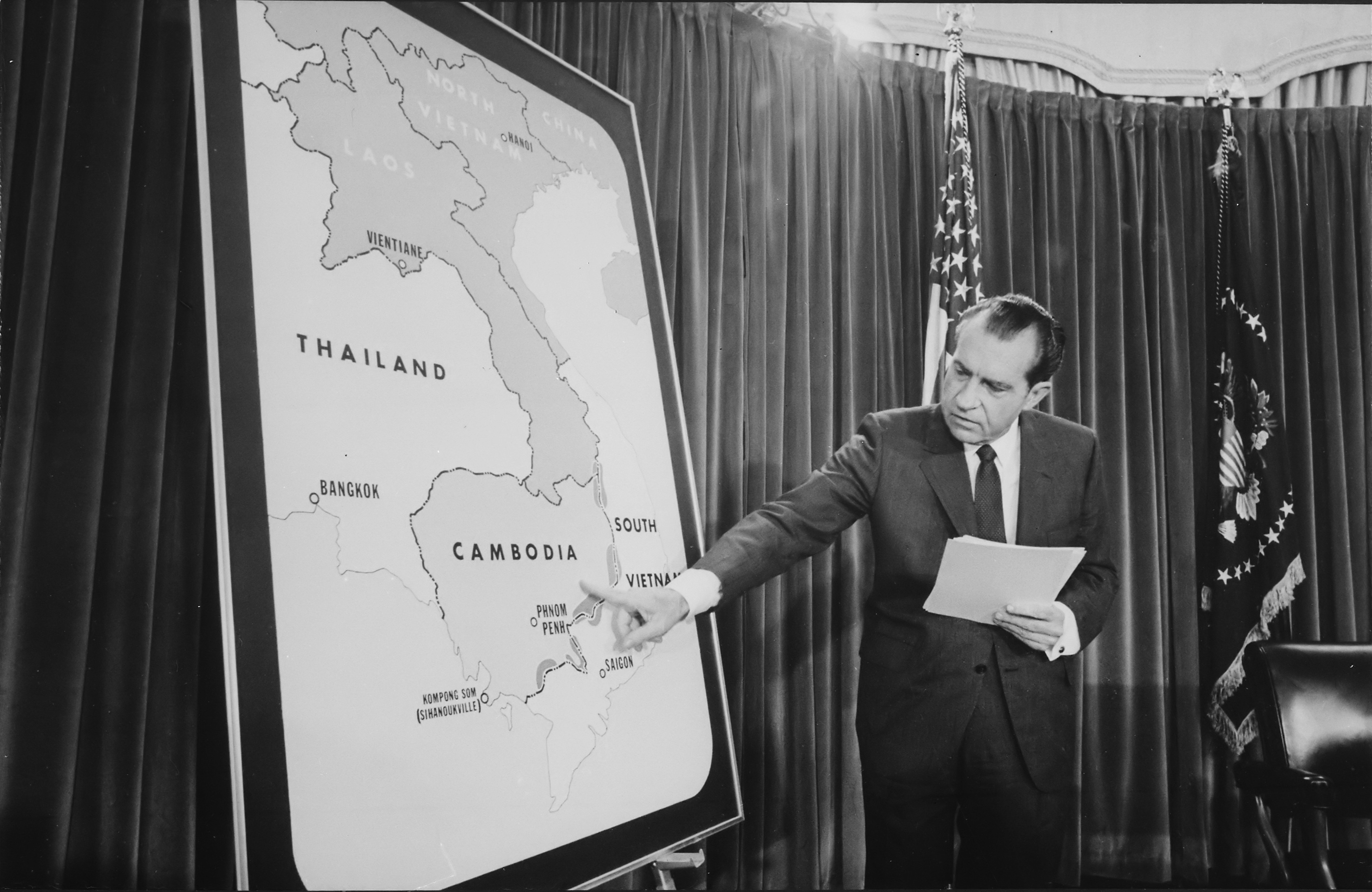
U.S. president Richard Nixon (shown here discussing Cambodia at a 1970 press conference) authorized the covert 1969–1970 bombing of Vietnamese targets in Ratanakiri.

In the 1960s, the ascendant Khmer Rouge forged an alliance with ethnic minorities in Ratanakiri, exploiting Khmer Loeu resentment of the central government. The Communist Party of Kampuchea headquarters was moved to Ratanakiri in 1966, and hundreds of Khmer Loeu joined CPK units. During this period, there was also extensive Vietnamese activity in Ratanakiri. Vietnamese communists had operated in Ratanakiri since the 1940s; at a June 1969 press conference, Sihanouk said that Ratanakiri was "practically North Vietnamese territory". Between March 1969 and May 1970, the United States undertook a massive covert bombing campaign in the region, aiming to disrupt sanctuaries for communist Vietnamese troops. Villagers were forced outside of main towns to escape the bombings, foraging for food and living on the run with the Khmer Rouge. In June 1970, the central government withdrew its troops from Ratanakiri, abandoning the area to Khmer Rouge control. The Khmer Rouge regime, which had not initially been harsh in Ratanakiri, became increasingly oppressive. The Khmer Loeu were forbidden from speaking their native languages or practicing their traditional customs and religion, which were seen as incompatible with communism. Communal living became compulsory, and the province's few schools were closed. Purges of ethnic minorities increased in frequency, and thousands of refugees fled to Vietnam and Laos. Preliminary studies indicate that bodies accounting for approximately 5% of Ratanakiri's residents were deposited in mass graves, a significantly lower rate than elsewhere in Cambodia.

After the Vietnamese defeated the Khmer Rouge in 1979, government policy toward Ratanakiri became one of benign neglect. The Khmer Loeu were permitted to return to their traditional livelihoods, but the government provided little infrastructure in the province. Under the Vietnamese, there was little contact between the provincial government and many local communities. Long after the fall of the Khmer Rouge regime, however, Khmer Rouge rebels remained in the forests of Ratanakiri. Rebels largely surrendered their arms in the 1990s, though attacks along provincial roads continued until 2002.

Ratanakiri's recent history has been characterized by development and attendant challenges to traditional ways of life. The national government has built roads, encouraged tourism and agriculture, and facilitated rapid immigration of lowland Khmers into Ratanakiri. Road improvements and political stability have increased land prices, and land alienation in Ratanakiri has been a major problem. Despite a 2001 law allowing indigenous communities to obtain collective title to traditional lands, some villages have been left nearly landless. The national government has granted concessions over land traditionally possessed by Ratanakiri's indigenous peoples, and even land "sales" have often involved bribes to officials, coercion, threats, or misinformation. Following the involvement of several international non-governmental organizations (NGOs), land alienation had decreased in frequency as of 2006. In the 2000s, Ratanakiri also received hundreds of Degar (Montagnard) refugees fleeing unrest in neighboring Vietnam; the Cambodian government was criticized for its forcible repatriation of many refugees.

== Geography and climate ==
Map of Ratanakiri, with major roads indicated in red

The geography of Ratanakiri is diverse, encompassing rolling hills, mountains, plateaus, lowland watersheds, and crater lakes. Two major rivers, Tonle San and Tonle Srepok, flow from east to west across the province. The province is known for its lush forests; as of 2015, 78% of the province was forested. In the far north of the province are mountains of the Annamite Range; the area is characterized by dense broadleaf evergreen forests, relatively poor soil, and abundant wildlife. In the highlands between Tonle San and Tonle Srepok, the home of the vast majority of Ratanakiri's population, a hilly basalt plateau provides fertile red soils. Secondary forests (regrown after shifting cultivation) dominate this region. South of the Srepok River is a flat area of tropical deciduous forests.

Like other areas of Cambodia, Ratanakiri has a monsoonal climate with a rainy season from June to October, a cool season from November to January, and a hot season from March to May. Ratanakiri tends to be cooler than elsewhere in Cambodia. The average daily high temperature in the province is 34.0 °C (93.2 °F), and the average daily low temperature is 22.1 °C (71.8 °F). Annual precipitation is approximately 2,200 millimetres (87 in). Flooding often occurs during the rainy season and has been exacerbated by the recently built Yali Falls Dam.

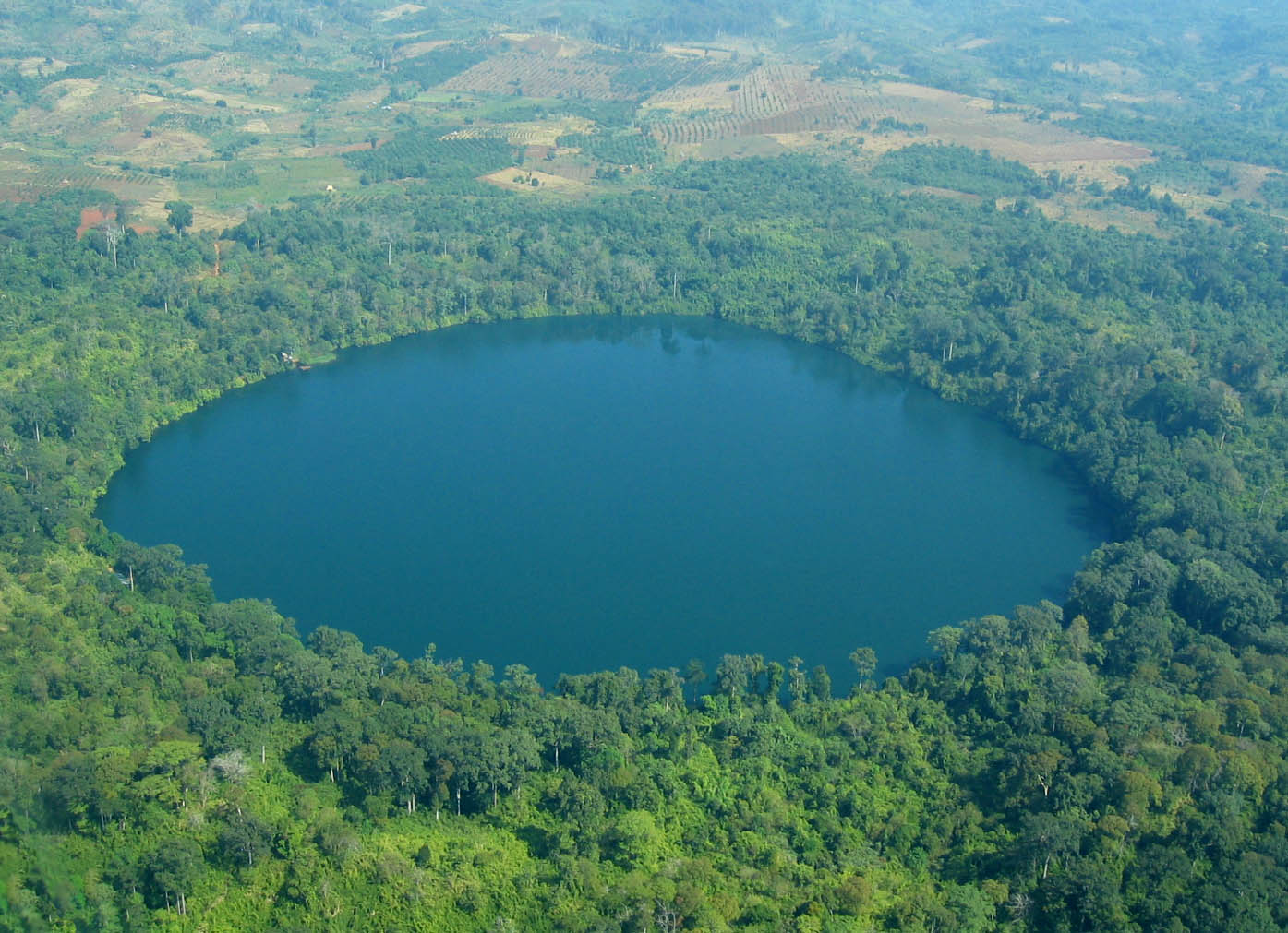
Aerial view of Yak Loum, a crater lake near Banlung

Ratanakiri has some of the most biologically diverse lowland tropical rainforest and montane forest ecosystems in mainland Southeast Asia. One 1996 survey of two sites in Ratanakiri and one site in neighboring Mondulkiri recorded 44 mammal species, 76 bird species, and 9 reptile species. A 2007 survey of Ratanakiri's Virachey National Park recorded 30 ant species, 19 katydid species, 37 fish species, 35 reptile species, 26 amphibian species, and 15 mammal species, including several species never before observed. Wildlife in Ratanakiri includes Asian elephants, gaur, and monkeys. Ratanakiri is an important site for the conservation of endangered birds, including the giant ibis and the greater adjutant. The province's forests contain a wide variety of flora; one half-hectare forest inventory identified 189 species of trees and 320 species of ground flora and saplings.

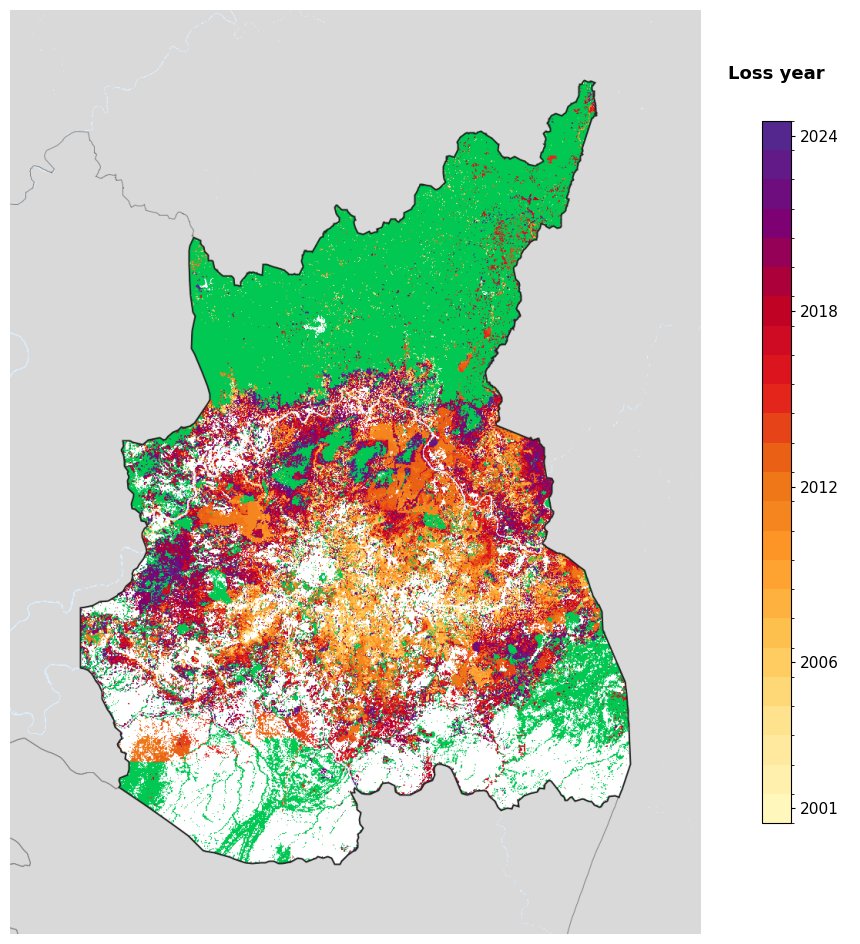
Tree-cover loss year in Ratanakiri, 2001-2024, from the Global Forest Change dataset.

Nearly half of Ratanakiri has been set aside in protected areas, which include Lomphat Wildlife Sanctuary, Virachey National Park, and Veun Sai-Siem Pang National Park. Even these protected areas, however, are subject to illegal logging, poaching, and mineral extraction. Though the province has been known for its relatively pristine environment, recent development has spawned environmental problems. The unspoiled image of the province often conflicts with the reality on the ground: visitors "expecting to find pristine forests teeming with wildlife are increasingly disappointed to find lifeless patches of freshly cut tree stumps". Land use patterns are changing as population growth has accelerated and agriculture and logging have intensified. Soil erosion is increasing, and microclimates are being altered. Habitat loss and unsustainable hunting have contributed to the province's decreasing biodiversity.

== Government and administrative divisions ==
Government in Ratanakiri is weak, largely due to the province's remoteness, ethnic diversity, and recent history of Khmer Rouge dominance. The provincial legal framework is poor, and the rule of law is even weaker in Ratanakiri than elsewhere in Cambodia. Furthermore, government services are ineffective and insufficient to meet the needs of the province. The Cambodian government has traditionally accepted substantial support from NGOs in the region.

Nhem Samoeurn is the provincial governor. As of the 2022 communal elections, commune councils in Ratanakiri are composed of 236 members representing the CPP, 22 members representing the Candlelight Party, one member representing the Grassroots Democracy Party, and one member representing the Khmer National United Party. Four commune council members in Ratanakiri (1.5%) were women as of the 2022 communal elections. Kith Try (គិត ទ្រី) represents Ratanakiri in the National Assembly of Cambodia.

Village government in Ratanakiri has both traditional and administrative components. Traditional forms of government, namely village elders and other indigenous institutions, are dominant. Members of each village designate one or more community elders to manage village affairs, mediate conflicts, and ensure that villagers follow customary laws, particularly about land and resource use. Elders do not play an autocratic role, and are instead primarily respected advisors and consensus builders. Village elders are generally male, but women also play a role in the management of the community and its resources. A village may also have a village chief—i.e., a local government person who is appointed by a higher governmental official. The village chief serves as a liaison between the village and outside government officials, but lacks traditional authority. The role of the village chief in village governance may be poorly defined; in one Kreung village, residents told a researcher that they were "very unclear exactly what the work of the village chief entailed."

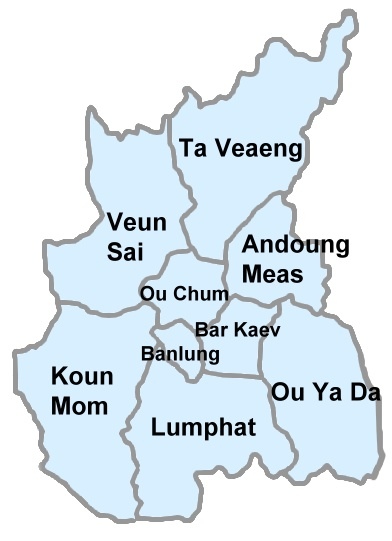
Map of Ratanakiri Province

The province is divided into eight districts and one municipality, further divided into 50 communes, as follows:

ISO Code	District	Communes	Population (2019)
1601	Andoung Meas	Malik, Nhang, Ta Lav	17,617
1602	Banlung Municipality	Kachanh, Labansiek, Yeak Laom, Boeng Kansaeng	30,399
1603	Bar Kaev	Kak, Keh Chong, La Minh, Lung Khung, Saeng, Ting Chak	28,279
1604	Koun Mom	Serei Mongkol, Srae Angkrorng, Ta Ang, Teun, Trapeang Chres, Trapeang Kraham	30,810
1605	Lumphat	Chey Otdam, Ka Laeng, Lbang Muoy, Lbang Pir, Ba Tang, Seda	27,839
1606	Ou Chum	Cha Ung, Chan, Aekakpheap, Kalai, Ou Chum, Sameakki, L'ak	25,301
1607	Ou Ya Dav	Bar Kham, Lum Choar, Pak Nhai, Pate, Sesant, Saom Thum, Ya Tung	23,932
1608	Ta Veaeng	Ta Veaeng Leu, Ta Veaeng Kraom	7,503
1609	Veun Sai	Ban Pong, Hat Pak, Ka Choun, Kaoh Pang, Kaoh Peak, Kok Lak, Pa Kalan, Phnum Kok, Veun Sai	27,210

== Economy and transportation ==
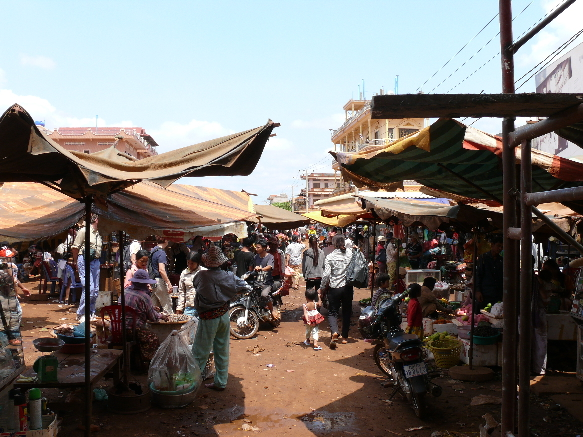
A local market in Banlung

The vast majority of workers in Ratanakiri are employed in agriculture. Most of the indigenous residents of Ratanakiri are subsistence farmers, practicing slash and burn shifting cultivation. (See Culture below for more information on traditional subsistence practices.) Many families are beginning to shift production to cash crops such as cashews, mangoes, and tobacco, a trend that has accelerated in recent years. Ratanakiri villagers have traditionally had little contact with the cash economy. As of 1997, barter exchange remained widespread, and Khmer Loeu villagers tended to visit markets only once per year until quite recently. In 2015, GDP per capita was US$2,794, up from $1,441 in 2005.

Larger-scale agriculture occurs on rubber and cashew plantations. Other economic activities in the province include gem mining and commercial logging. The most abundant gem in Ratanakiri is blue zircon. Small quantities of amethyst, blue sapphire and Peridot are also produced. Gems are generally mined using traditional methods, with individuals digging holes and tunnels and manually removing the gems; recently, however, commercial mining operations have been moving into the province. Logging, particularly illegal logging, has been a problem both for environmental reasons and because of land alienation. In 1997, an estimated 300,000 cubic meters of logs were exported illegally from Ratanakiri to Vietnam, compared to a legal limit of 36,000 cubic meters. John Dennis, a researcher for the Asian Development Bank, described the logging in Ratanakiri as a "human rights emergency".

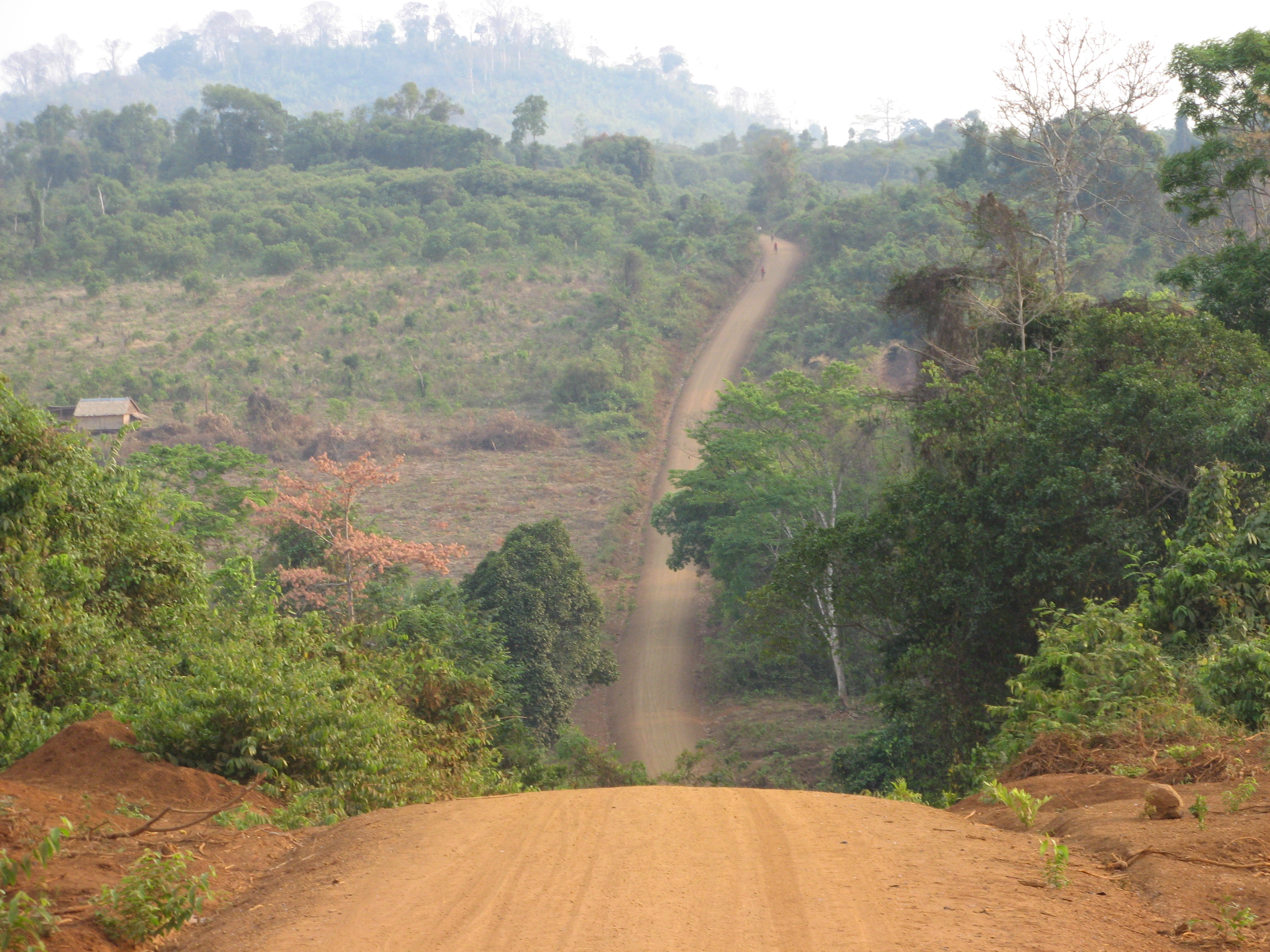
A road in rural Ratanakiri

Ratanakiri's tourist industry has rapidly expanded in recent years: visits to the province increased from 6,000 in 2002 to 105,000 in 2008 and 118,000 in 2011. The region's tourism development strategy focuses on encouraging ecotourism. Increasing tourism in Ratanakiri has been problematic because local communities receive very little income from tourism and because guides sometimes bring tourists to villages without residents' consent, disrupting traditional ways of life. A few initiatives have sought to address these issues: a provincial tourism steering committee aims to ensure that tourism is non-destructive, and some programs provide English and tourism skills to indigenous people.

Ox-cart and motorcycle are common means of transportation in Ratanakiri. The provincial road system is better than in some parts of the country, but remains in somewhat bad condition. National Road 78 between Banlung and the Vietnam border was built between 2007 and 2010; the road was expected to increase trade between Cambodia and Vietnam. There is a small airport in Banlung, but commercial flights to Ratanakiri have long been discontinued.

== Demographics and towns ==
Tampuan children in Ratanakiri Province

As of 2013, Ratanakiri Province had a population of approximately 184,000. Its population nearly doubled between 1998 and 2013, largely due to internal migration. In 2013, Ratanakiri made up 1.3% of Cambodia's total population; its population density of 17.0 residents per square kilometer was just over one fifth the national average. About 70% of the province's population lives in the highlands; of the other 30%, approximately half live in more urbanized towns, and half live along rivers and in the lowlands, where they practice wetland rice cultivation and engage in market activities. Banlung, the provincial capital located in the central highlands, is by far the province's largest town, with a population of approximately 25,000. Other significant towns include Veun Sai in the north and Lomphat in the south, with populations of 2,000 and 3,000 respectively.

In 2013, 37% of Ratanakiri residents were under age 15, 52% were age 15 to 49, 7% were age 50 to 64, and 3% were aged 65 or older; 49.7% of residents were male, and 50.3% were female. Each household had an average of 4.9 members, and most households (85.6%) were headed by men.

While highland peoples have inhabited Ratanakiri for well over a millennium, lowland peoples have migrated to the province in the last 200 years. As of 2013, various highland groups collectively called Khmer Loeu made up approximately half of Ratanakiri's population, ethnic Khmers made up 36%, and ethnic Lao made up 10%. Within the Khmer Loeu population, 35% were Tampuan as of 1996, 24% were Jarai, 23% were Kreung, 11% were Brou, 3% were Kachok, and 3% were Kavet, with other groups making up the remaining one percent. There are also very small Vietnamese, Cham, and Chinese minorities. Though the official language of Ratanakiri (like all of Cambodia) is Khmer, each indigenous group speaks its own language. As of 2006, less than 10% of Ratanakiri's indigenous population could speak Khmer fluently.

== Health, education, and development ==
Health indicators in Ratanakiri have been improving rapidly but remain relatively poor by Cambodian standards. In 2015, life expectancy was 61.9, up from 41.2 in 2005. As of 2010, 10.6% of children died before the age of five in Ratanakiri and neighboring Mondulkiri, and 55% of children had moderately to severely stunted growth. Ratanakiri residents' historically poor health can be attributed to a variety of factors, including poverty, remoteness of villages, poor quality medical services, and language and cultural barriers that prevent Khmer Loeu from obtaining medical care. As of 2006, the province had two hospitals, 14 health centers, and 15 health posts. The Ratanakiri Provincial Referral Hospital lacks sufficient staff and equipment for major surgeries, for which transfer to urban hospitals is required.

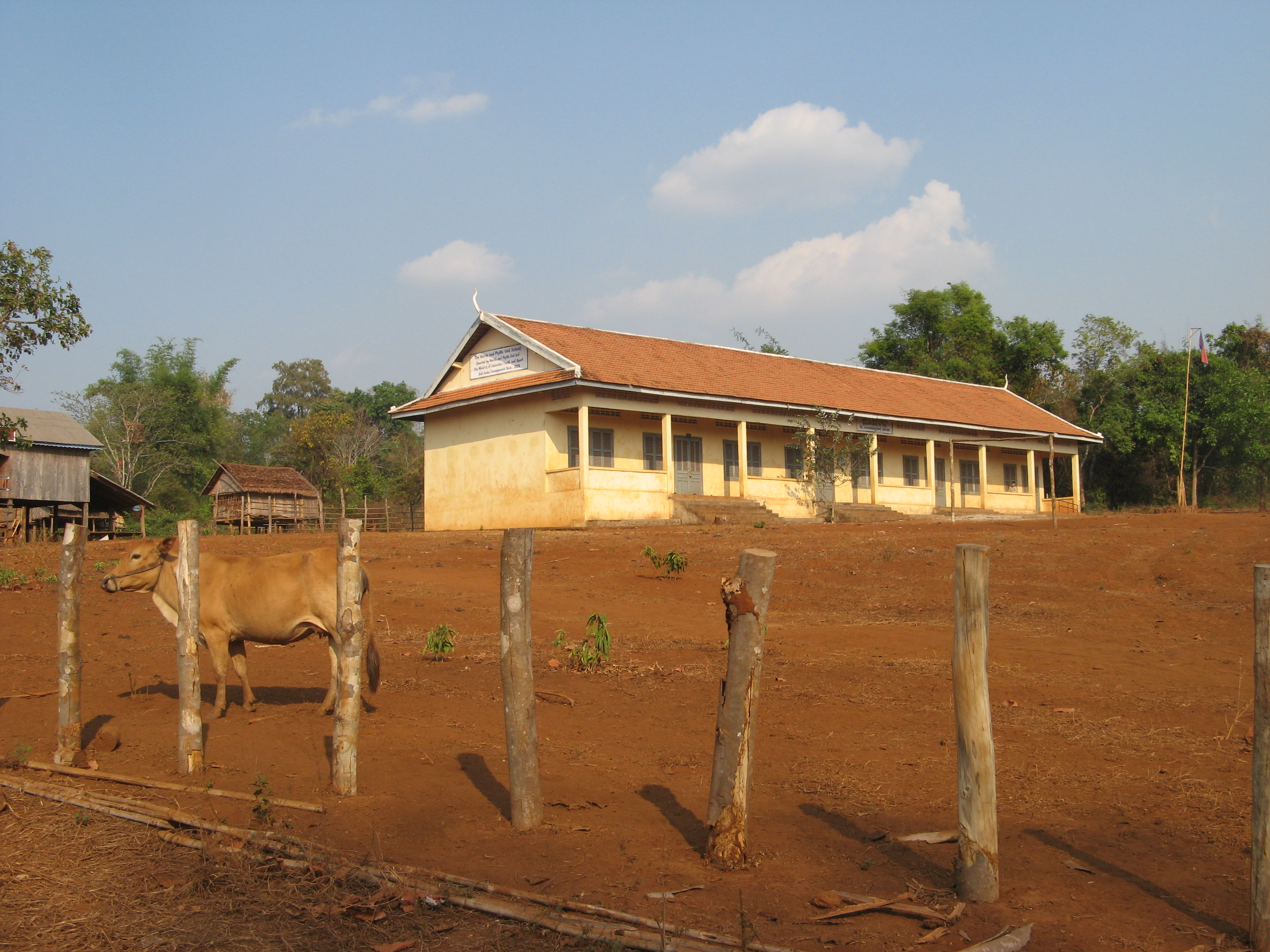
A village school in Ratanakiri

As of 2024, Ratanakiri had 259 primary schools, 23 lower secondary schools, and seven upper secondary schools—a significant increase from 1998, when there were 76 primary schools, one lower secondary school, and one upper secondary school. 65.3% of adults in Ratanakiri were literate as of 2019, compared to 84.5% in Cambodia overall. In 2015, residents had on average 3.4 years of schooling, up from 0.2 years in 2005. Access to education has historically been limited in Ratanakiri because of the expense of books, distance to schools, children's need to contribute to their families' livelihood, frequent absence of teachers, and instruction that is culturally inappropriate and in a language foreign to most students. Bilingual education initiatives, in which students begin instruction in native languages and gradually transition to instruction in Khmer, began in Ratanakiri in 2002 and appear to have been successful.

Ratanakiri is one of the least developed provinces in Cambodia. As of 2013, only 14.9% of buildings in the province had permanent roofs, walls, and flooring. As of 2019, the average home had approximately 2.0 rooms, and about 51.2% of households had toilet facilities of any kind. The most common sources of water were rivers, springs, dams or lakes (19.5% of households), protected wells (17.1%), and unprotected wells (14.2%). The most common source of light was battery power (53.1%), followed by government-provided power (41.2%). Most households (79.2%) used firewood as the main fuel for cooking. A variety of NGOs, including Oxfam and Health Unlimited, work to improve health and living conditions in the province.

== Culture ==
Khmer Loeu typically practice subsistence slash and burn shifting cultivation in small villages of between 20 and 60 nuclear families. Each village collectively owns and governs a forest territory whose boundaries are known though not marked. Within this land, each family is allocated, on average, 1–2 hectares (2.5–5 acres) of actively cultivated land and 5–6 hectares (12.5–15 acres) of fallow land. The ecologically sustainable cultivation cycle practiced by the Khmer Loeu generally lasts 10 to 15 years. Villagers supplement their agricultural livelihood with low-intensity hunting, fishing, and gathering over a large area.

Khmer Loeu diets in Ratanakiri are largely dictated by the food that is available for harvesting or gathering. Numerous food taboos also limit food choice, particularly among pregnant women, children, and the sick. The primary staple grain is rice, though most families experience rice shortages during the six months before harvest time. Some families have begun to plant maize to alleviate this problem; other sources of grain include potatoes, cassava, and taro. Most Khmer Loeu diets are low in protein, which is limited in availability. Wild game and fish are major protein sources, and smaller animals such as rats, wild chickens, and insects are also sometimes eaten. Domestic animals such as pigs, cows, and buffaloes are only eaten when sacrifices are made. In the rainy season, many varieties of vegetables and leaves are gathered from the forest. (Vegetables are generally not cultivated.) Commonly eaten fruits include bananas, jackfruit, papayas, and mangoes.

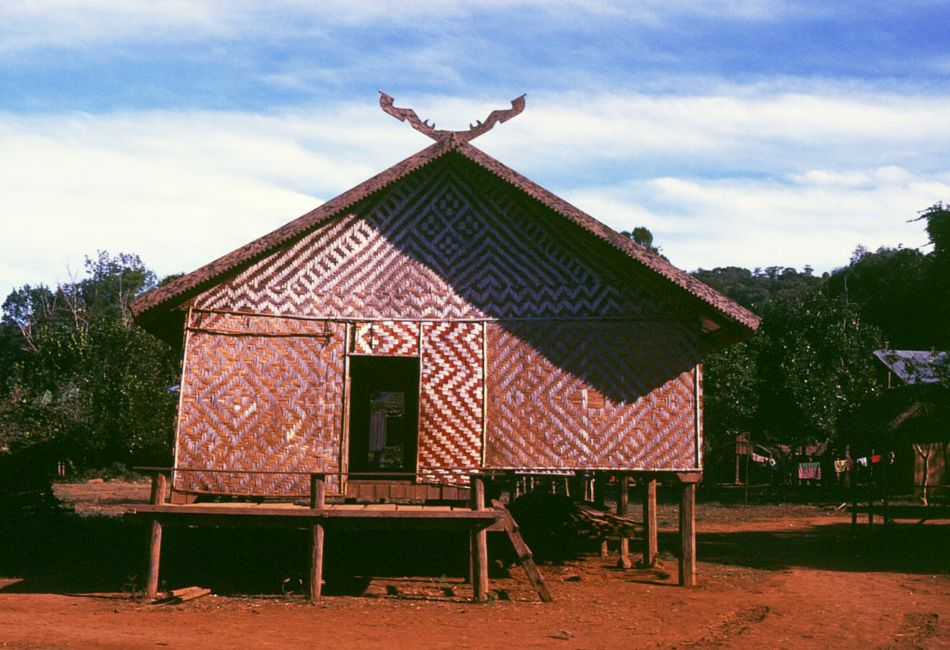
Meeting house in a Kreung village near Banlung

Houses in rural Ratanakiri are made from bamboo, rattan, wood, saek, and kanma leaves, all of which are collected from nearby forests; they typically last for around three years. Village spatial organization varies by ethnic group. Kreung villages are constructed in a circular manner, with houses facing inwards toward a central meeting house. In Jarai villages, vast longhouses are inhabited by all extended families, with the inner house divided into smaller compartments. Tampuan villages may follow either pattern.

Nearly all Khmer Loeu are animist, and their cosmologies are intertwined with the natural world. Some forests are believed to be inhabited by local spirits, and local taboos forbid cutting in those areas. Within spirit forests, certain natural features such as rock formations, waterfalls, pools, and vegetation are sacred. Major sacrificial festivals in Ratanakiri occur during March and April, when fields are selected and prepared for the new planting season. Christian missionaries are present in the province, and some Khmer Loeu have converted to Christianity. Indigenous community representatives have described the missionaries as a major threat to their society. The region's ethnic Khmer are Buddhist. There is also a small Muslim community, consisting mainly of ethnic Cham.

Because of the province's high prevalence of malaria and its distance from regional centers, Ratanakiri was isolated from Western influences until the late 20th century. Major cultural shifts have occurred in recent years however, particularly in villages near roads and district towns; these changes have been attributed to contact with internal immigrants, government officials, and NGO workers. Clothing and diets are becoming more standardized, and traditional music is being displaced by Khmer music. Many villagers have also observed a loss of respect for elders and a growing divide between the young and the old. Young people have begun to refuse to abide by traditional rules and have stopped believing in spirits.

== Notable people ==
- Pao Ham Phan, former provincial governor of Ratanakiri
