= Banlung Municipality =

Banlung municipality ក្រុងបានលុង Krong Banlung
- Municipality
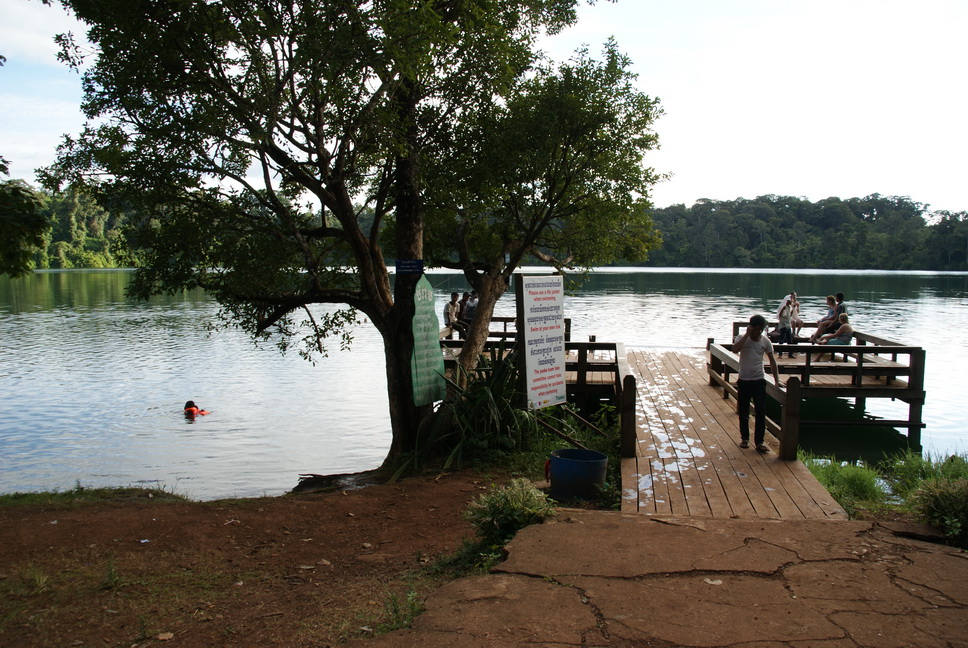
- Lake Yeak Laom

- Location in Cambodia
- Coordinates: 13°44′29″N 106°59′14″E
- Country: Cambodia
- Province: Ratanakiri
- Capital: Banlung

Government
  - Type: City municipality

Population (1998)
  - Total: 16,999
- Time zone: UTC+7 (ICT)
- Geocode: 1602

Banlung municipality (Khmer: ក្រុងបានលុង) is a municipality (krong) in Ratanakiri province, northeast of Cambodia. In 1998, it had a population of 16,999. It surrounds the provincial capital of Banlung.

== Administration ==
As of 2020, the municipality is subdivided into 4 communes (sangkat) and further subdivided into 19 villages (phum).

No.	Code	Name	Khmer	Villages
1	1602-01	Kanchanh	កាចាញ	Muoy, Pir, Bei, Buon
2	1602-02	Labansiek	ឡាបានសៀក	Chey Chumneas, Prampir Makara, Thmei, Aphiwat, Ou Romeat
3	1602-03	Yeak Laom	យក្សឡោម	Lon, Phnum, Sil, La Pou, Chri
4	1602-04	Boeng Kansaeng	បឹងកន្សែង	Tes Anlung, Ou Kansaeng, Phnom Svay, Ou Kontil, Thma Da
