= Banlung =

Banlung បានលុង Banlŭng
- City
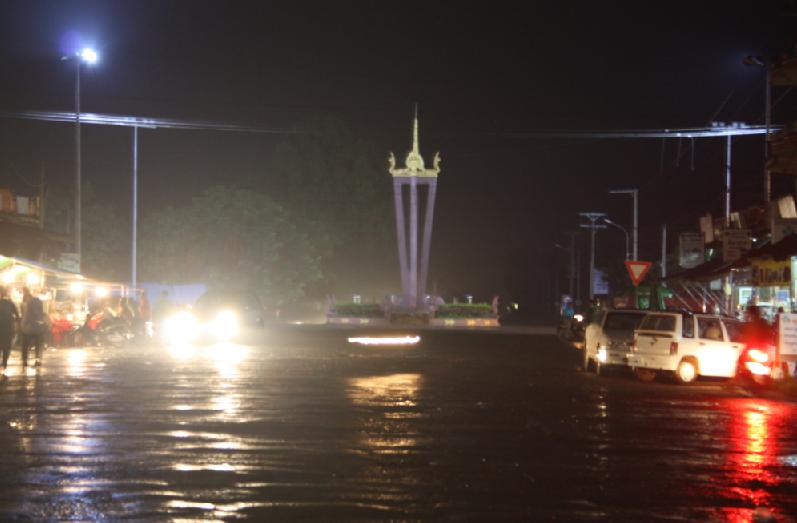
- Banlung Independence Monument at night.

- Location within Cambodia
- Coordinates: 13°44′48″N 107°0′16″E
- Country: Cambodia
- Province: Ratanakiri
- Municipality: Banlung

Population (2019)
  - Total: 30,399
- Time zone: UTC+7 (ICT)

Banlung (Khmer: បានលុង, Banlŭng [ɓaːnluŋ]) is the capital of Ratanakiri Province in northeastern Cambodia, and is 636 kilometres from the Cambodian capital of Phnom Penh. Ratanakiri Province borders Vietnam and Laos. Banlung had been previously known as Banlung district before it officially gained town status. The town has a population of around 17,000 and the surrounding district has a population of 23,888.

The town became the capital of Ratanakiri Province in 1979, following the fall of the Khmer Rouge. The capital was moved from Veun Sai to Banlung in order to facilitate trade with Vietnam (prior to Veun Sai, the capital was Lumphat). Prior to 1979, Banlung was known as Labansiek.

It is a relatively lively commercial centre; people from surrounding villages often come to the town market to sell their goods.

Three kilometres west of Banlung are the Katieng Waterfalls, where Ratnakiri's last elephants are covered by a conservation programme operated by the Airavata Elephant Foundation.

== Transportation ==
The most convenient way to reach Banlung is by road. It is well connected with its neighbouring cities such as Stung Treng, Kratie and Phnom Penh. One can fly into Phnom Penh International Airport and travel by road from there.

== Administration ==
Banlung city is divided into 4 sangkats (communes) which together contain 20 villages.

Sangkat	Khmer	Villages	Population (2019)
Kachanh	កាចាញ	Phum Muoy, Phum Pir, Phum Bei, Phum Buon	6,453
Labansiek	ឡាបានសៀក	Phum Muoy, Phum Pir, Phum Bei, Phum Buon, Phum Pram, Phum Prammuoy, Phum Prampir (Village 1, 2, 3, 4, 5, 6, 7)	12,319
Yeak Laom	យក្ខឡោម	Lon, Phnum, Sil, La Pou, Chri	3,755
Boeng Kansaeng	បឹងកន្សែង	Tes Anlung, Ou Konsaeng, Phnom Svay, Ou Kontil	7,872

== Infrastructure ==
Electricity in Banlung is produced by the nearby O Chum 2 Hydropower Dam, but in the region only around 13% of homes have access to electricity.

== Climate ==
Climate data for Banlung (1982–2024)
Month	Jan	Feb	Mar	Apr	May	Jun	Jul	Aug	Sep	Oct	Nov	Dec	Year
Mean daily maximum °C (°F)	32.7 (90.9)	34.8 (94.6)	35.6 (96.1)	36.6 (97.9)	35.2 (95.4)	32.9 (91.2)	32.6 (90.7)	32.3 (90.1)	32.4 (90.3)	33.8 (92.8)	33.2 (91.8)	32.5 (90.5)	33.7 (92.7)
Mean daily minimum °C (°F)	18.8 (65.8)	20.6 (69.1)	22.4 (72.3)	23.9 (75.0)	23.5 (74.3)	23.7 (74.7)	22.9 (73.2)	22.7 (72.9)	22.5 (72.5)	22.0 (71.6)	21.5 (70.7)	18.4 (65.1)	21.9 (71.4)
Average precipitation mm (inches)	6.6 (0.26)	56.3 (2.22)	69.6 (2.74)	76.4 (3.01)	103.9 (4.09)	250.7 (9.87)	276.4 (10.88)	301.5 (11.87)	277.3 (10.92)	213.6 (8.41)	86.9 (3.42)	9.8 (0.39)	1,729 (68.08)
Source: World Meteorological Organization

== Gallery ==
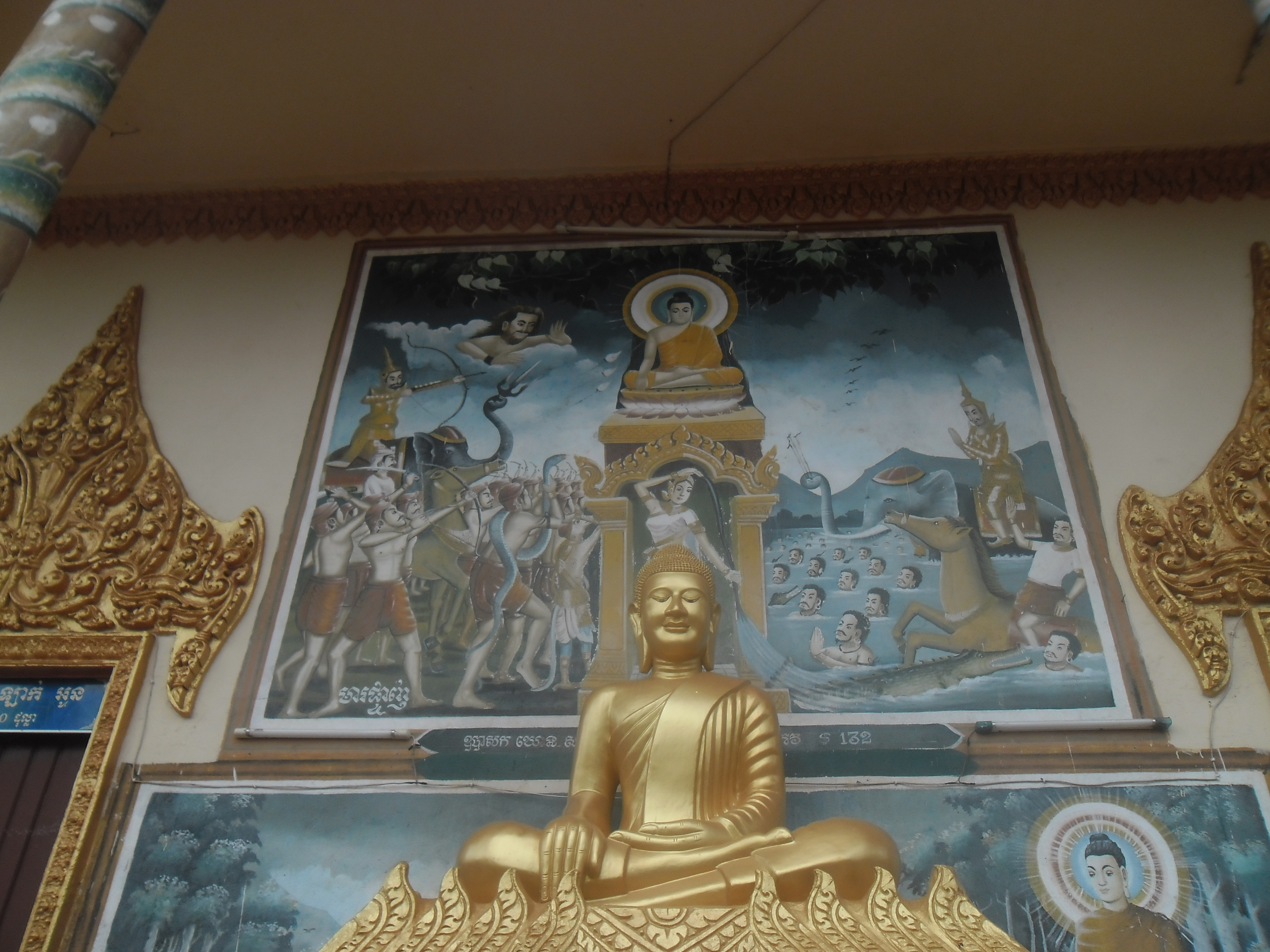

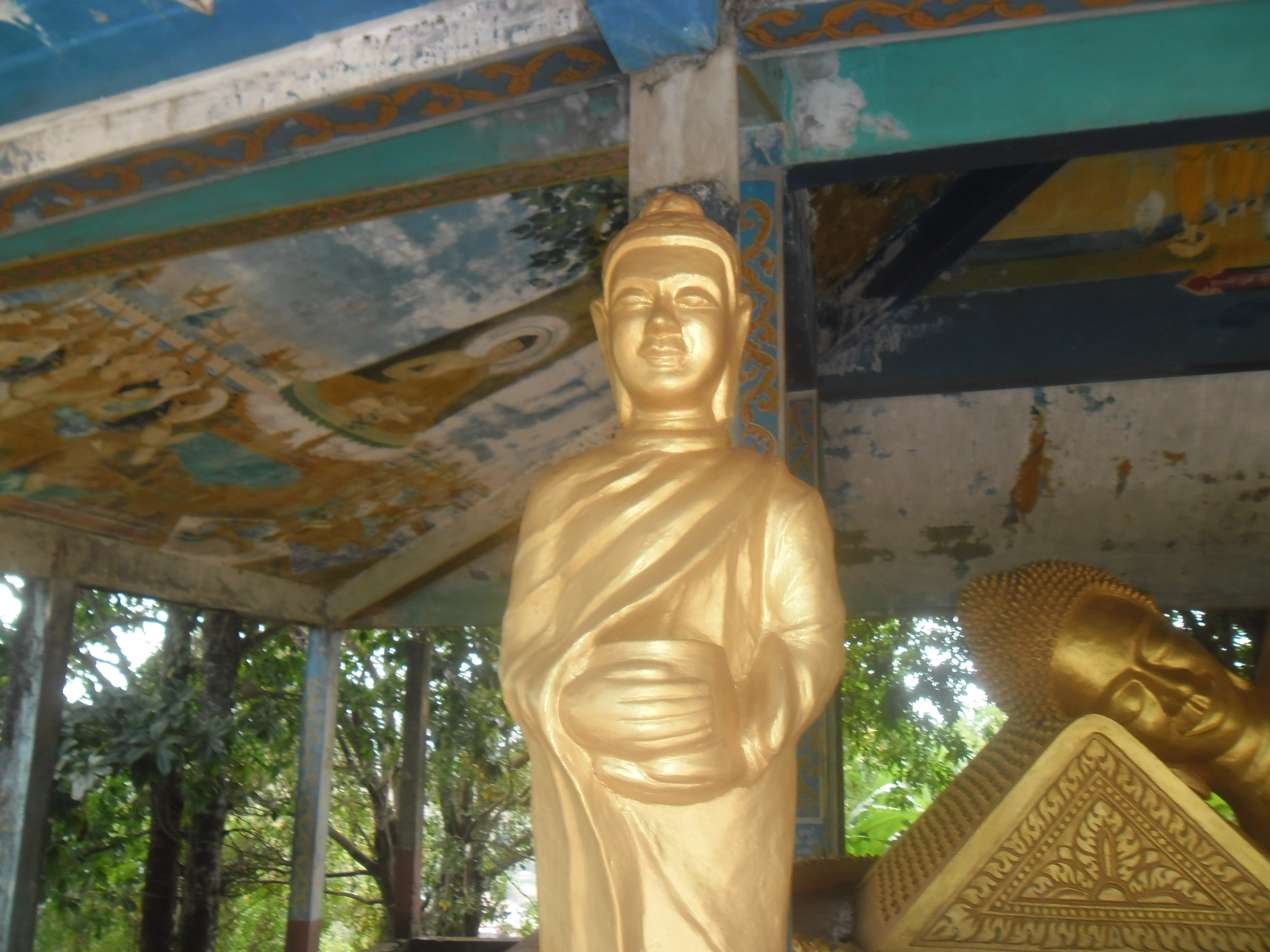

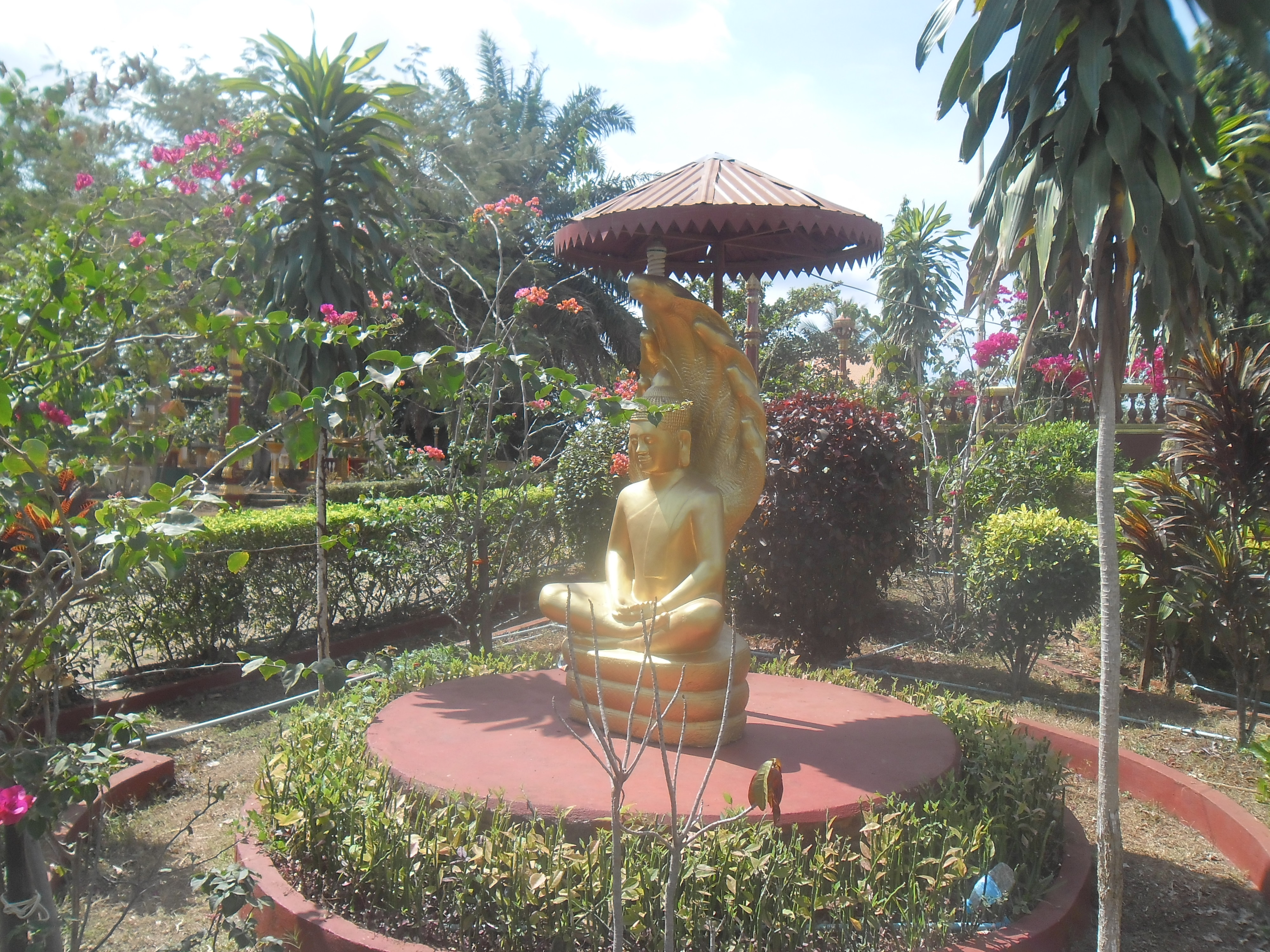

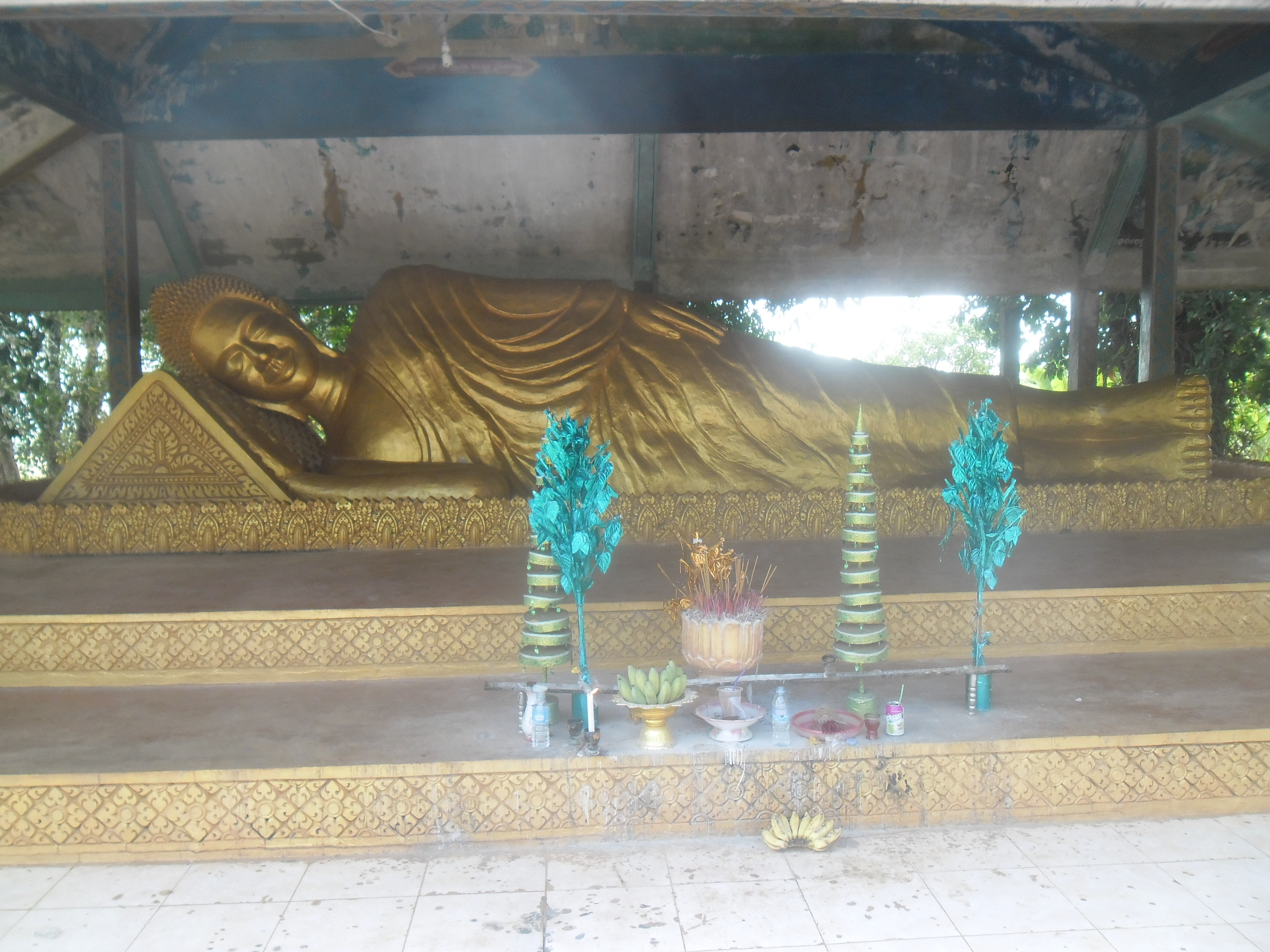

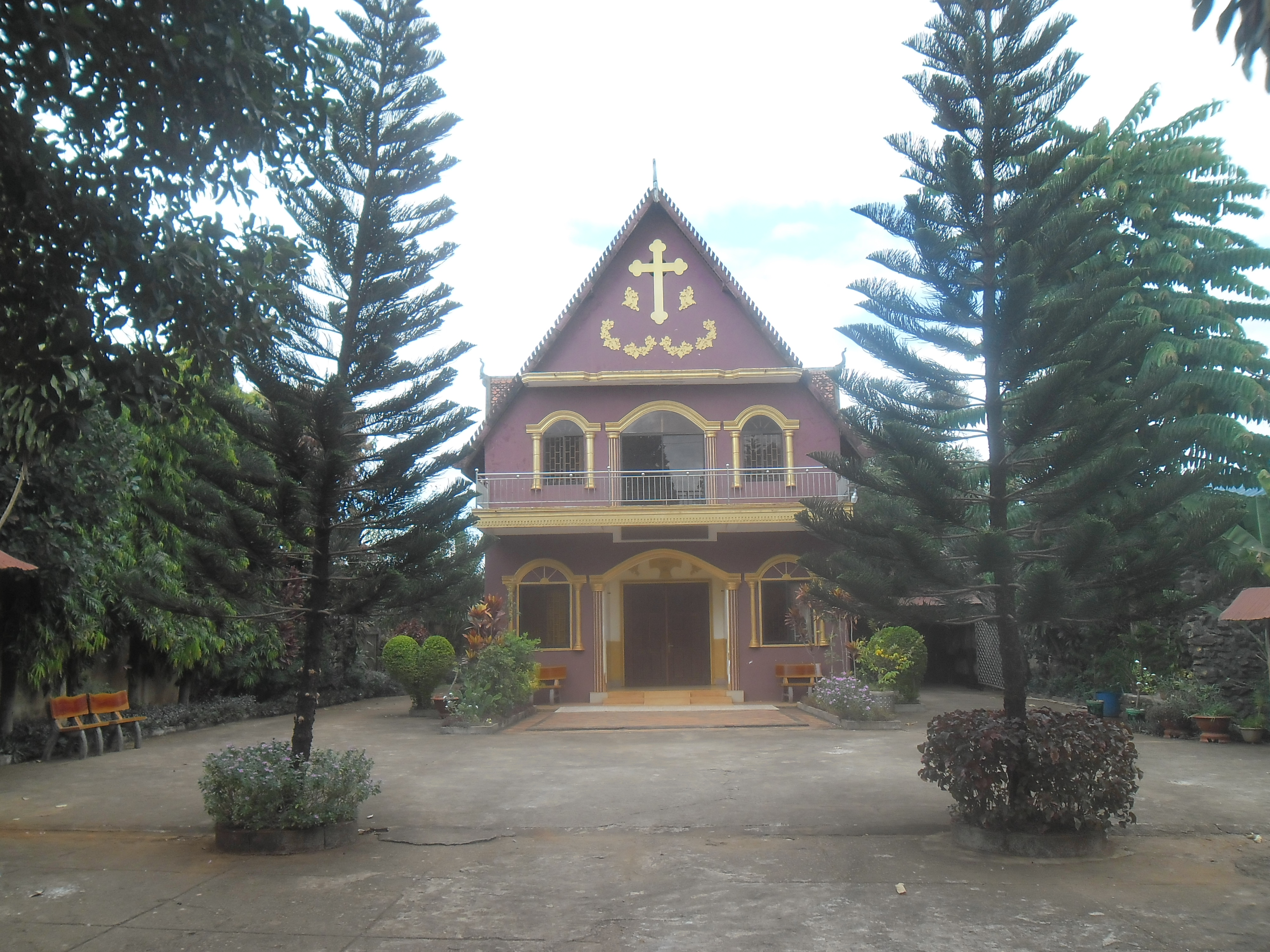

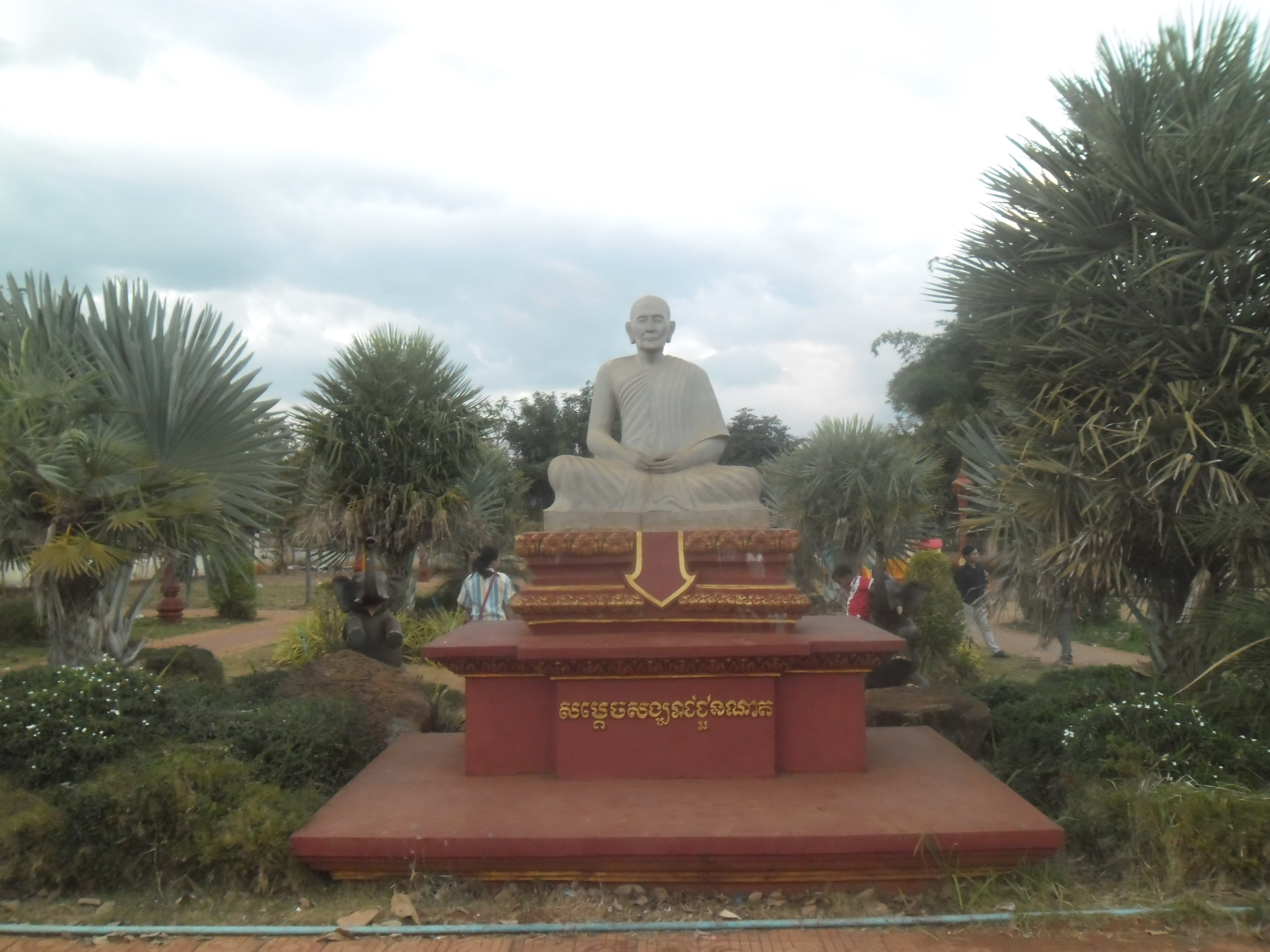

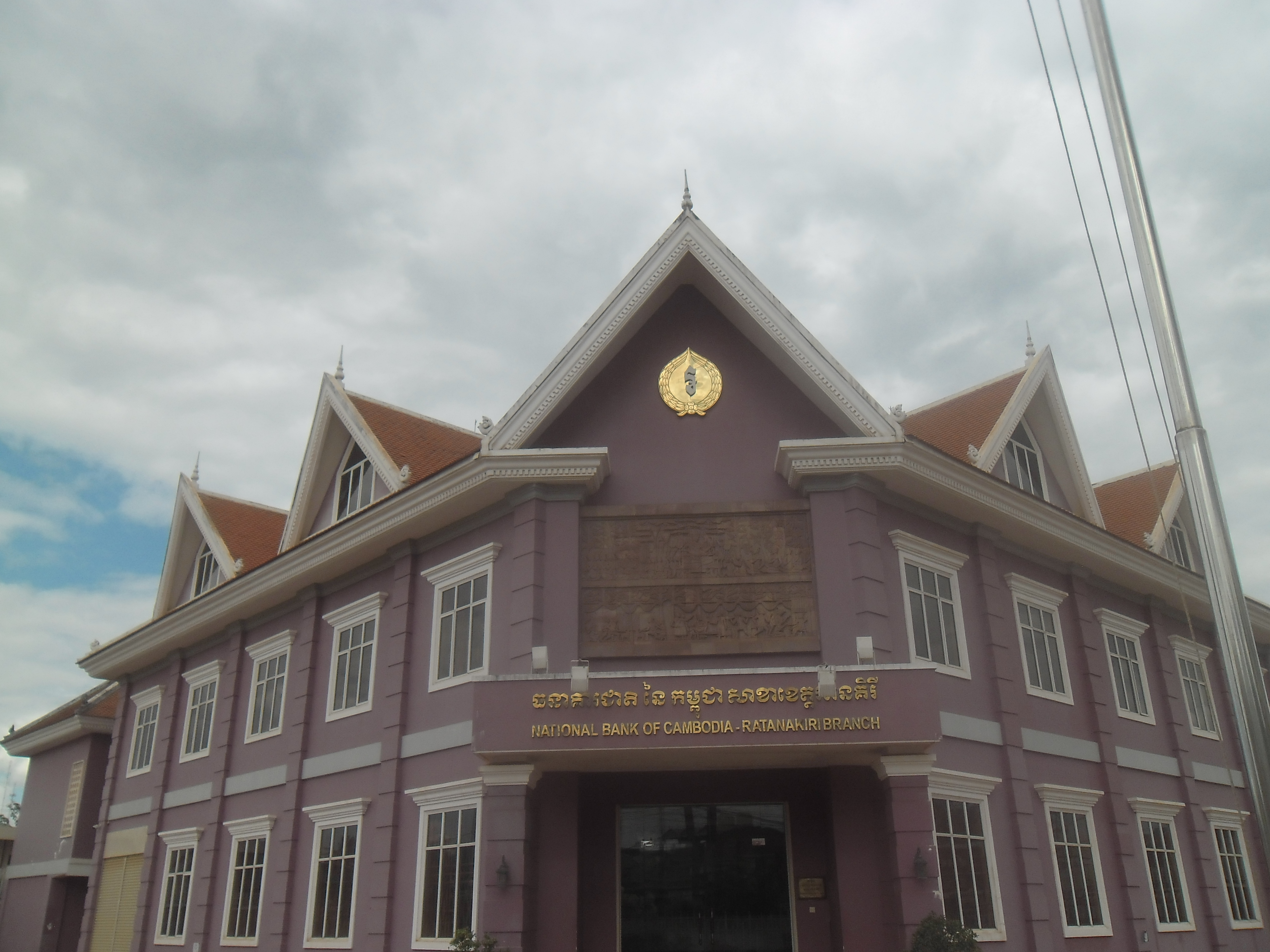

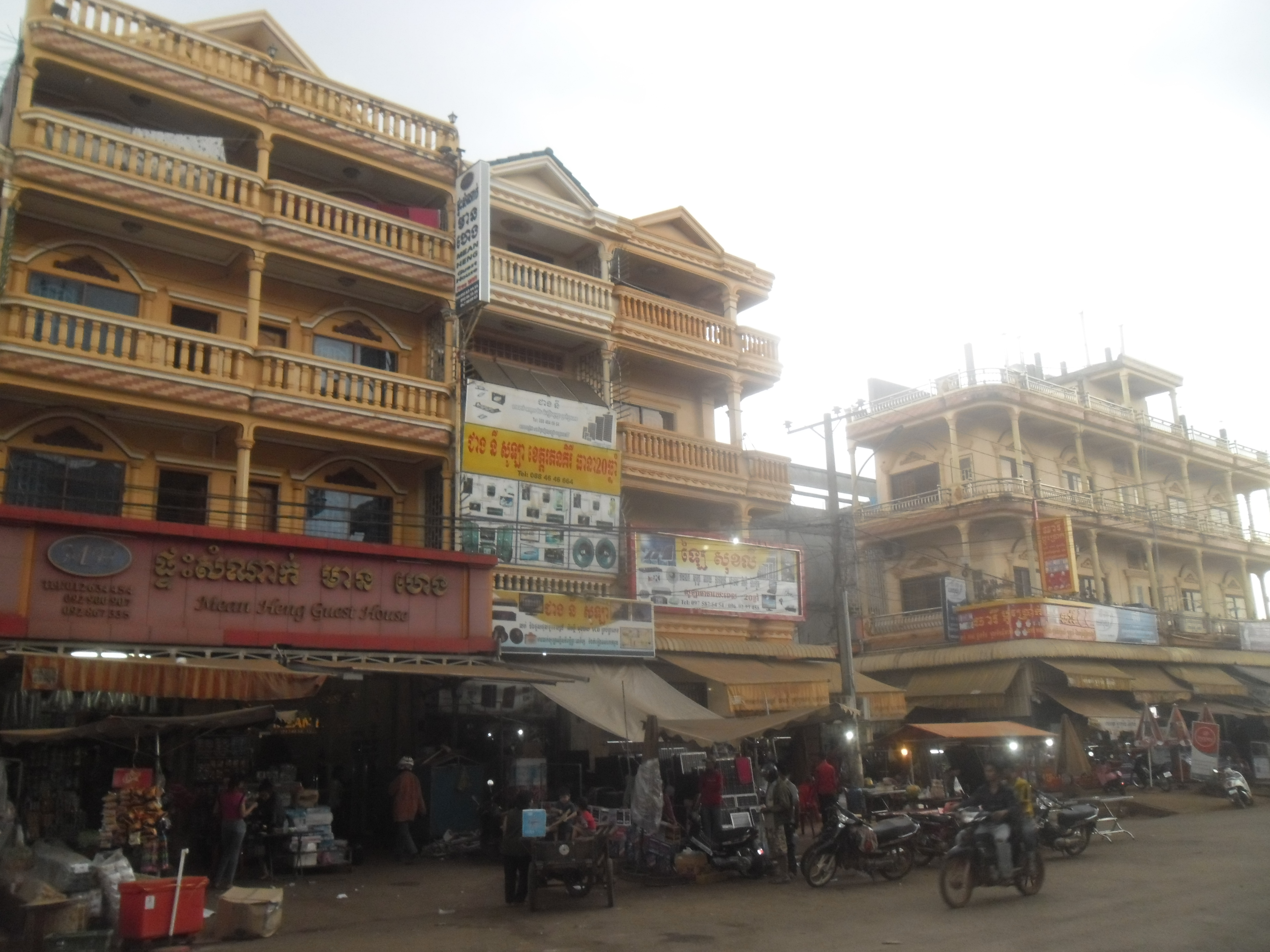

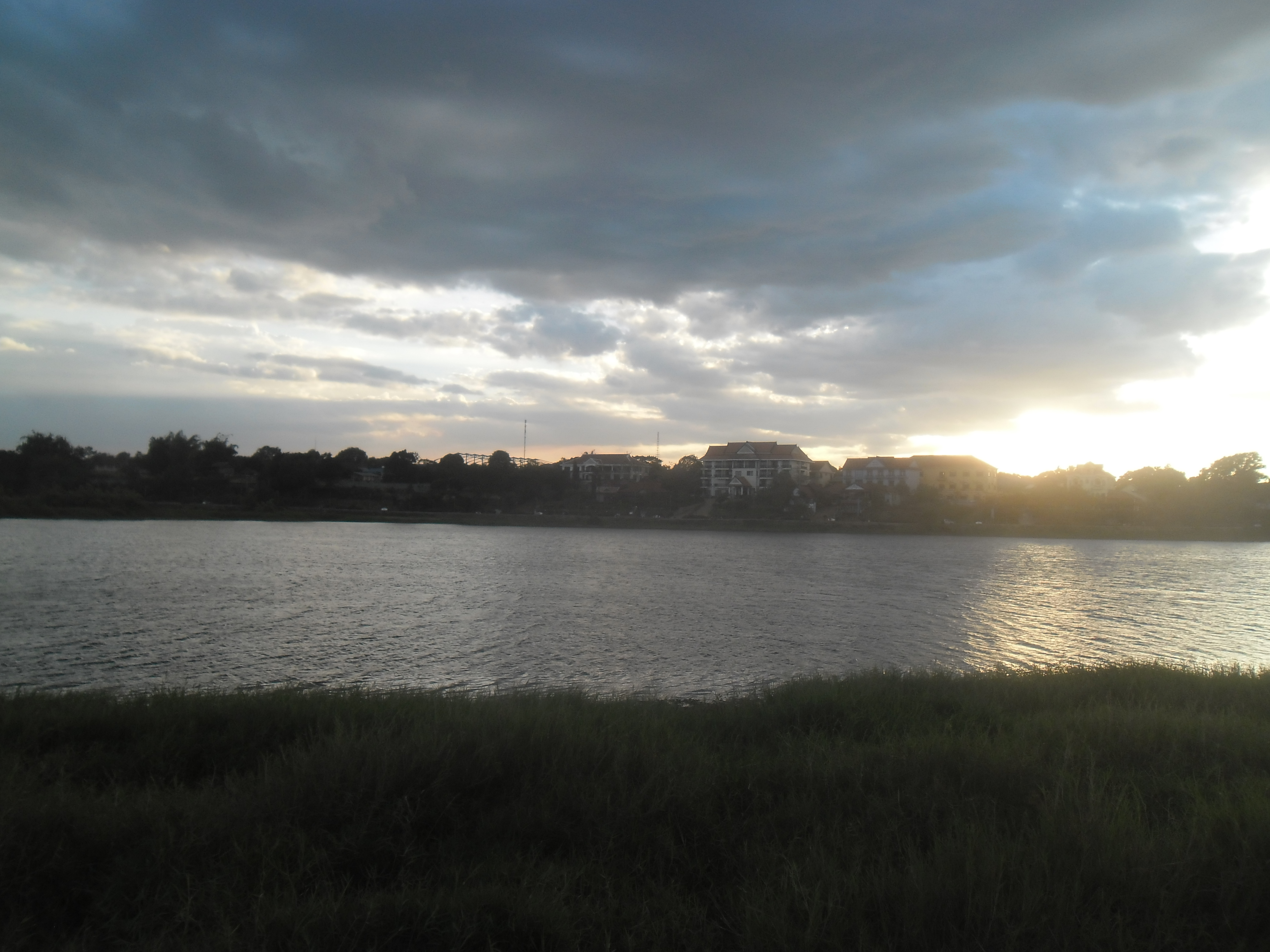

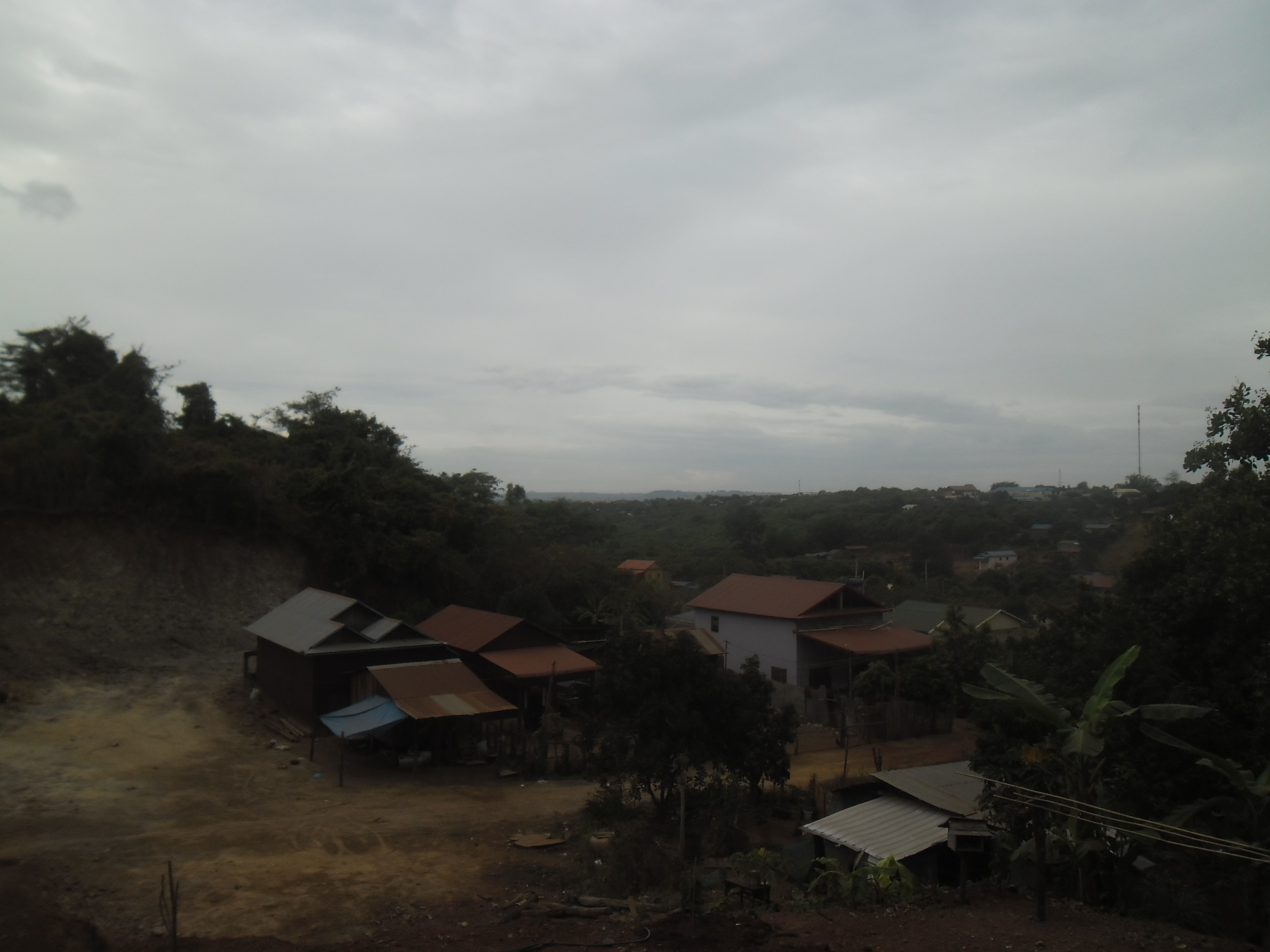
