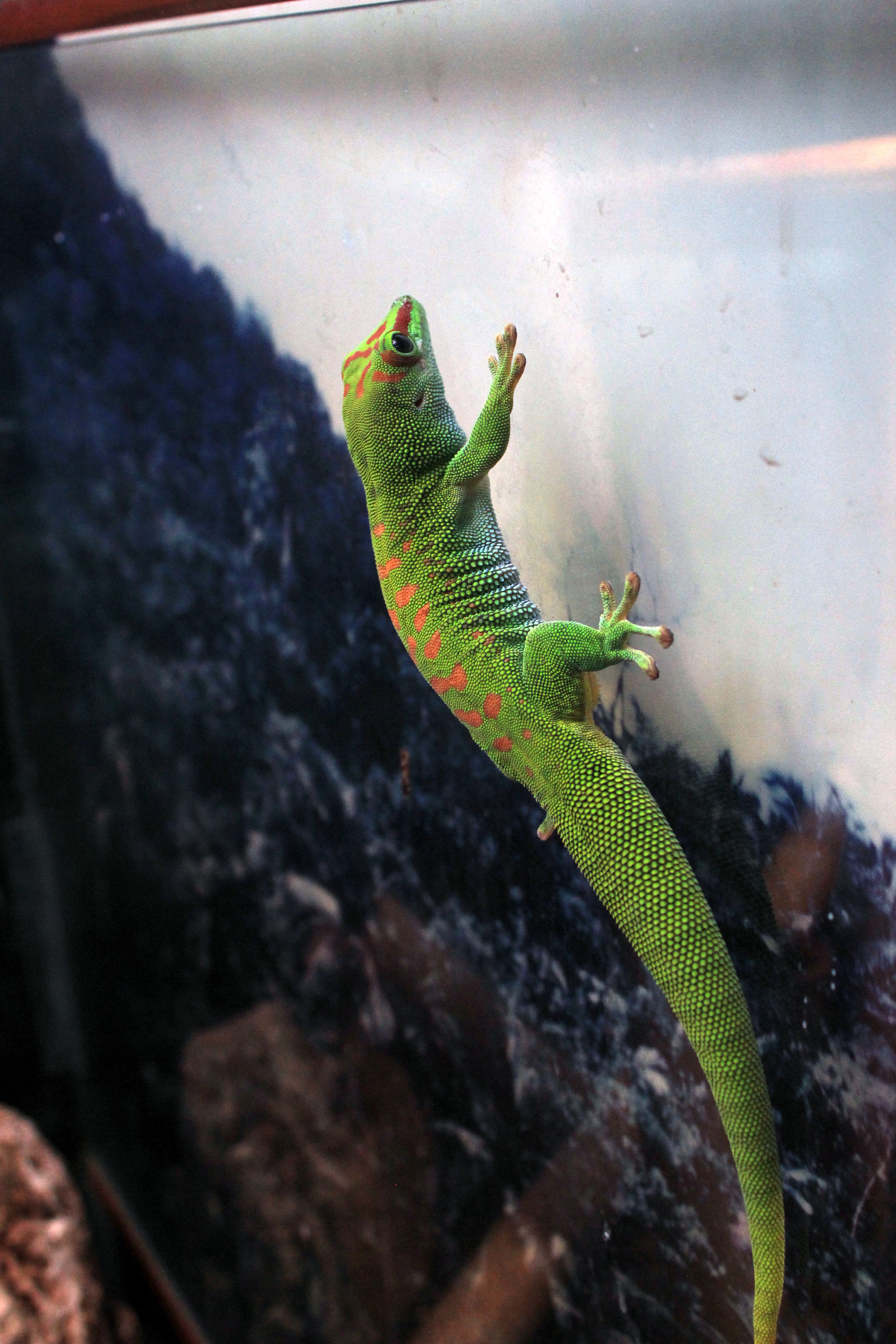

Scientific classification
- Domain: Eukaryota
- Kingdom: Animalia
- Phylum: Chordata
- Class: Reptilia
- Order: Squamata
- Infraorder: Gekkota
- Family: Gekkonidae
- Genus: Phelsuma
- Species: P. sundbergi
- Subspecies: P. s. sundbergi

Trinomial name
- Phelsuma sundbergi sundbergi Rendahl, 1939

= Seychelles giant day gecko =

Subspecies of lizard

The Seychelles giant day gecko (Phelsuma sundbergi sundbergi) is a diurnal subspecies of geckos. It lives on the island Praslin in the Seychelles and typically inhabits trees and dwellings. The Seychelles giant day gecko feeds on insects and nectar.

== Scientific synonyms ==
- Phelsuma sundbergi Rendahl, 1939
- Phelsuma pulchra Rendahl, 1939
- Phelsuma cousinense Rendahl, 1939
- Phelsuma menaiensis Mertens, 1966
- Phelsuma rubra Börner & Minuth, 1982
- Phelsuma umbrae Börner & Minuth, 1982

== Description ==
This lizard is one of the larger day geckos. It can reach a total length of about 20 cm. The body colour is bright green or bluish green. A faint red stripe extends from the nostril to the eye. On the back there are irregularly shaped reddish dots and bars present. The ventral side is white.

== Distribution ==
This species is found on the island Praslin and Curieuse in the Seychelles

== Habitat ==
Phelsuma sundbergi sundbergii is often found on different large trees such coconut palms, sea grape and coco-de-mer palms (Lodoicea maldivica). This species also lives on human dwellings. This day gecko also shares its habitat with Phelsuma astriata which may be eaten or pursued by the Seychelles giant day gecko if it attempts to reside on the same trees.

== Diet ==
These day geckos feed on various insects and other invertebrates. They also like to lick soft, sweet fruit, pollen and nectar.

== Behaviour ==
While feeding, these geckos aid in the pollination of palm trees by transferring pollen between female and male trees.

== Reproduction ==
The females of this species are colony nesters and more than 50 eggs can be found at one location. At a temperature of 28 °C, the juveniles will hatch after approximately 56–71 days.

== Care and maintenance in captivity ==
These animals should be housed in pairs. They need a large, well planted terrarium. The temperature should be about 28 °C during the day. The humidity should be maintained around 65–75% during the day and slightly higher at night. In captivity, these animals can be fed with crickets, wax moth larvae, fruit flies, mealworms and houseflies.
