= Ban Fang =

Ban Fang may refer to:

- Ban Fang, a village in Ban Pong, Cambodia
- Amphoe Ban Fang, a district in Thailand
- Ban Fang, Kaset Wisai - Roi Et Province, Thailand
- Ban Fang, Kranuan - Khon Kaen Province, Thailand
- Ban Fang, Sakhrai - Nong Khai Province, Thailand
