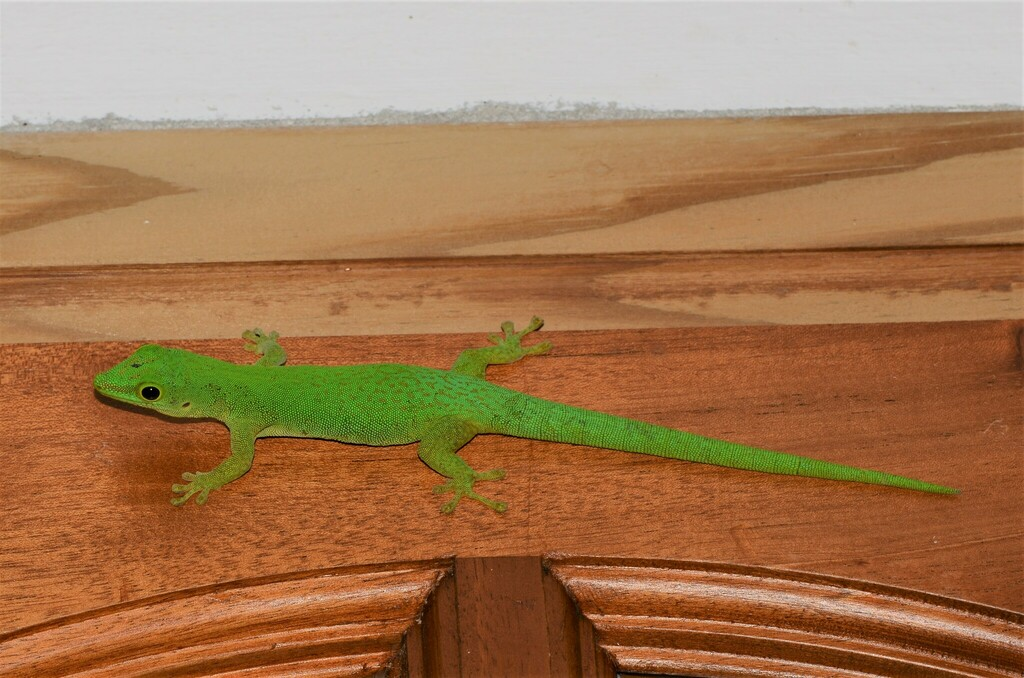

Scientific classification
- Kingdom: Animalia
- Phylum: Chordata
- Class: Reptilia
- Order: Squamata
- Suborder: Gekkota
- Family: Gekkonidae
- Genus: Phelsuma
- Species: P. sundbergi
- Subspecies: P. s. ladiguensis

Trinomial name
- Phelsuma sundbergi ladiguensis Böhme & Meier, 1981

Synonyms
- Phelsuma madagascariensis ladiguensis Böhme & Meier, 1981

= Phelsuma sundbergi ladiguensis =

Subspecies of lizard

Phelsuma sundbergi ladiguensis is a diurnal subspecies of Phelsuma sundbergi. It lives on the islands Ladigue, Felicite and Cocco in the Seychelles, and typically inhabits trees and dwellings. The Seychelles giant day gecko feeds on insects and nectar.

== Description ==
This lizard is a large day gecko. It can reach a total length of about 16 cm. The body color is bright green or bluish green. A faint red stripe extends from the nostril to the eye. On the back there are irregularly shaped reddish dots and bars present which can be quite variable in appearance. These geckos have yellow eye rings. The throat is yellow. The ventral side is yellowish white or yellow.

== Distribution ==
This species is found on the islands La Digue, Felicité and Cocco in the Seychelles.

== Habitat ==
Phelsuma sundbergi ladiguensis is often found on different large trees such coconut palms. This species also lives near or on human dwellings.

== Diet ==
These day geckos feed on various insects and other invertebrates. They also like to lick soft, sweet fruit, pollen and nectar.

== Behaviour ==
While feeding, these geckos aid in the pollination of palm trees by transferring pollen between female and male trees.

== Reproduction ==
The females of this species are colony nesters and more than 50 eggs can be found at one location. At a temperature of 28 °C, the juveniles will hatch after approximately 56–71 days.

== Care and maintenance in captivity ==
These animals should be housed singly or in pairs. Unpaired P. sundbergi ladiguensis are prone to fighting, sometimes causing significant injury or death if not quickly removed.

This is a skittish species that should not be handled and is prone to escape. They need a large, well planted terrarium. The temperature should be about 28 °C during the day. The humidity should be maintained around 65–75% during the day and slightly higher at night. In captivity, these animals can be fed with crickets, wax moth larvae, fruit flies, mealworms and houseflies. A commercial powered Crested Gecko diet (made by Repashy and mixed with water), supplemented with occasional insects, works well and supports breeding. This diet works well for most fruit/nectar-eating geckos.
