= Banded supple skink =

Conservation status
- Least Concern (IUCN 3.1)

Scientific classification
- Kingdom: Animalia
- Phylum: Chordata
- Class: Reptilia
- Order: Squamata
- Family: Scincidae
- Genus: Lygosoma
- Species: L. haroldyoungi

Binomial name
- Lygosoma haroldyoungi (Taylor, 1962)
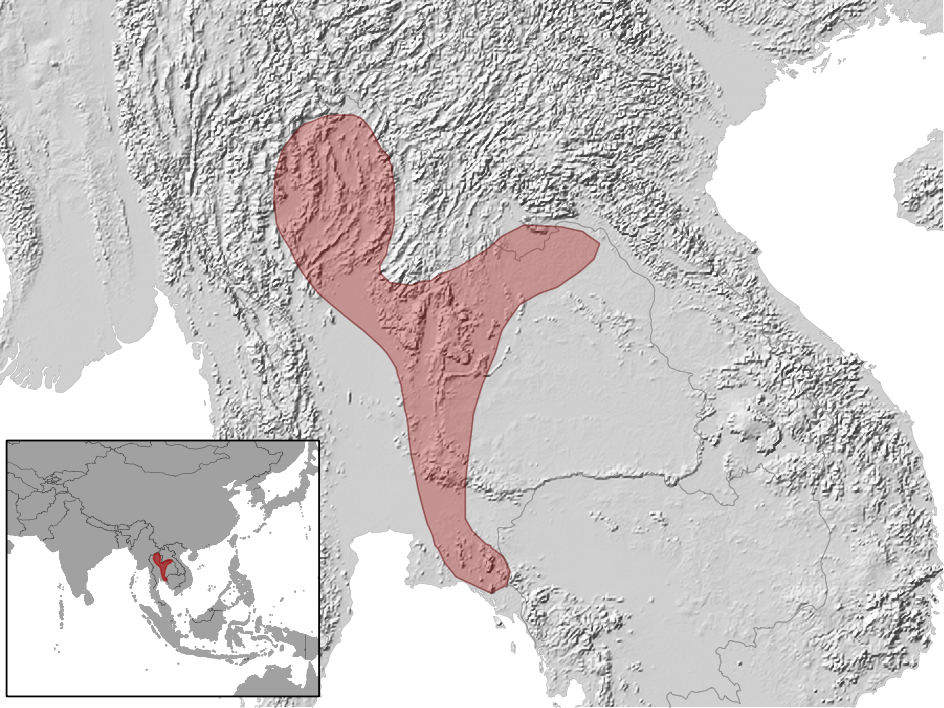
- Geographic range of Lygosoma haroldyoungi in Southeast Asia.

Synonyms
- Riopa haroldyoungi Taylor, 1962; Lygosoma haroldyoungi — Nabhitabhata, 2004; Riopa haroldyoungi — Moravec & Böhme, 2008; Lygosoma haroldyoungi — Geissler et al., 2012

Species of lizard

The banded supple skink (Lygosoma haroldyoungi), also known commonly as Harold's writhing skink and Harold Young's supple skink, is a species of lizard in the family Scincidae. The species is endemic to Southeast Asia.

== Etymology ==
The specific name, haroldyoungi, is in honor of American missionary Harold Young, who worked in Burma (now Myanmar) and Thailand, and founded the Chiang Mai Zoo.

== Distribution ==
L. haroldyoungi is distributed in northern, central, and eastern Thailand and neighbouring Laos (Moravec and Böhme 2008). In Thailand it has been found in the provinces of Chachoengsao, Chaiyaphum, Chanthaburi, Chiang Mai, Chiang Rai, Nong Khai, Phetchabun, Phitsanulok, Nakhon Ratchasima, and Loei. In Laos it occurs in Vientiane Province, and it is also found in Myanmar.

== Habitat ==
L. haroldyoungi is found in tropical deciduous forest and cultivated areas, at altitudes of 100–500 m (330–1,640 ft).

== Description ==
As an adult, L. haroldyoungi has a snout-to-vent length (SVL) of 11.5–14.8 cm (4.5–5.8 in). It has four legs, all of which are very short.

== Diet ==
L. haroldyoungi preys upon earthworms and insects.

== Reproduction ==
The mode of reproduction of L. haroldyoungi is unknown.

== Conservation status ==
L. haroldyoungi is threatened by habitat loss, but this is not a significant threat as it survives in agricultural areas.
