= Veun Sai (commune) =

Veun Sai វើនសៃ
- Commune
- Location within Cambodia
- Coordinates: 13.966887°N 106.822128°E
- Country: Cambodia
- Province: Ratanakiri Province
- District: Veun Sai
- Villages: 6

Population (1998)
  - Total: 2,443
- Time zone: UTC+07

Veun Sai (Khmer: វើនសៃ) is a commune in Veun Sai District in northeast Cambodia. It contains six villages and has a population of 2443. In the 2007 commune council elections, four seats went to members of the Cambodian People's Party and one seat went to a member of Funcinpec. Land alienation is a problem of moderate severity in Veun Sai. (See Ratanakiri Province for background information on land alienation.)

== Villages ==
| Village | Population (1998) | Sex ratio (male/female) (1998) | Number of households (1998) |
|---|---|---|---|
| Veun Sai | 464 | 0.93 | 78 |
| Pak Kae | 235 | 0.91 | 44 |
| I Tub | 252 | 1.02 | 45 |
| Thmei | 257 | 1.02 | 41 |
| Ka Lan | 836 | 1.03 | 134 |
| Kang Nak | 399 | 0.87 | 57 |

== See also ==
- Lygosoma veunsaiense first discovered at Veun Sai in 2010.
