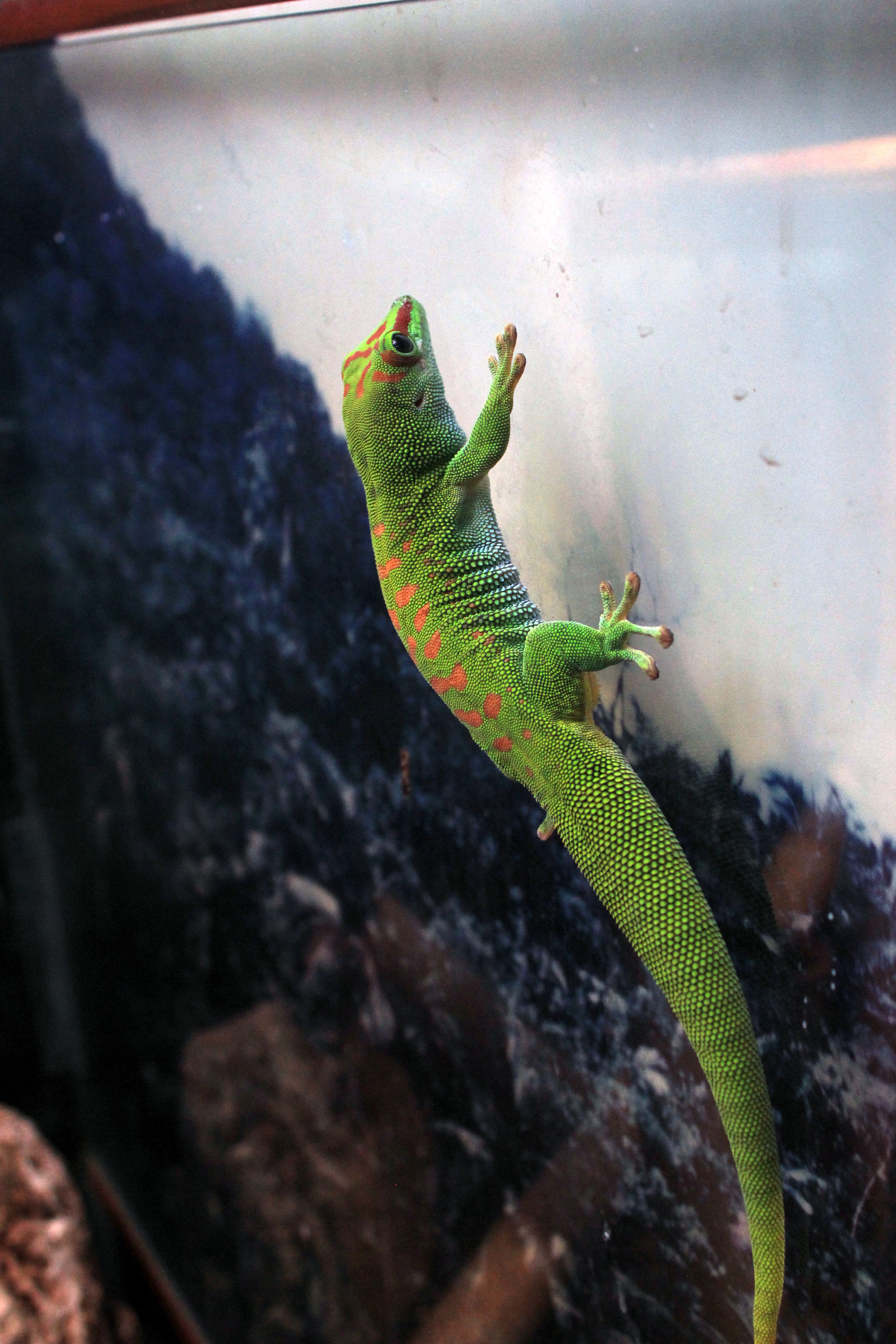

Conservation status
- Least Concern (IUCN 3.1)

Scientific classification
- Kingdom: Animalia
- Phylum: Chordata
- Class: Reptilia
- Order: Squamata
- Suborder: Gekkota
- Family: Gekkonidae
- Genus: Phelsuma
- Species: P. sundbergi

Binomial name
- Phelsuma sundbergi Rendahl, 1939
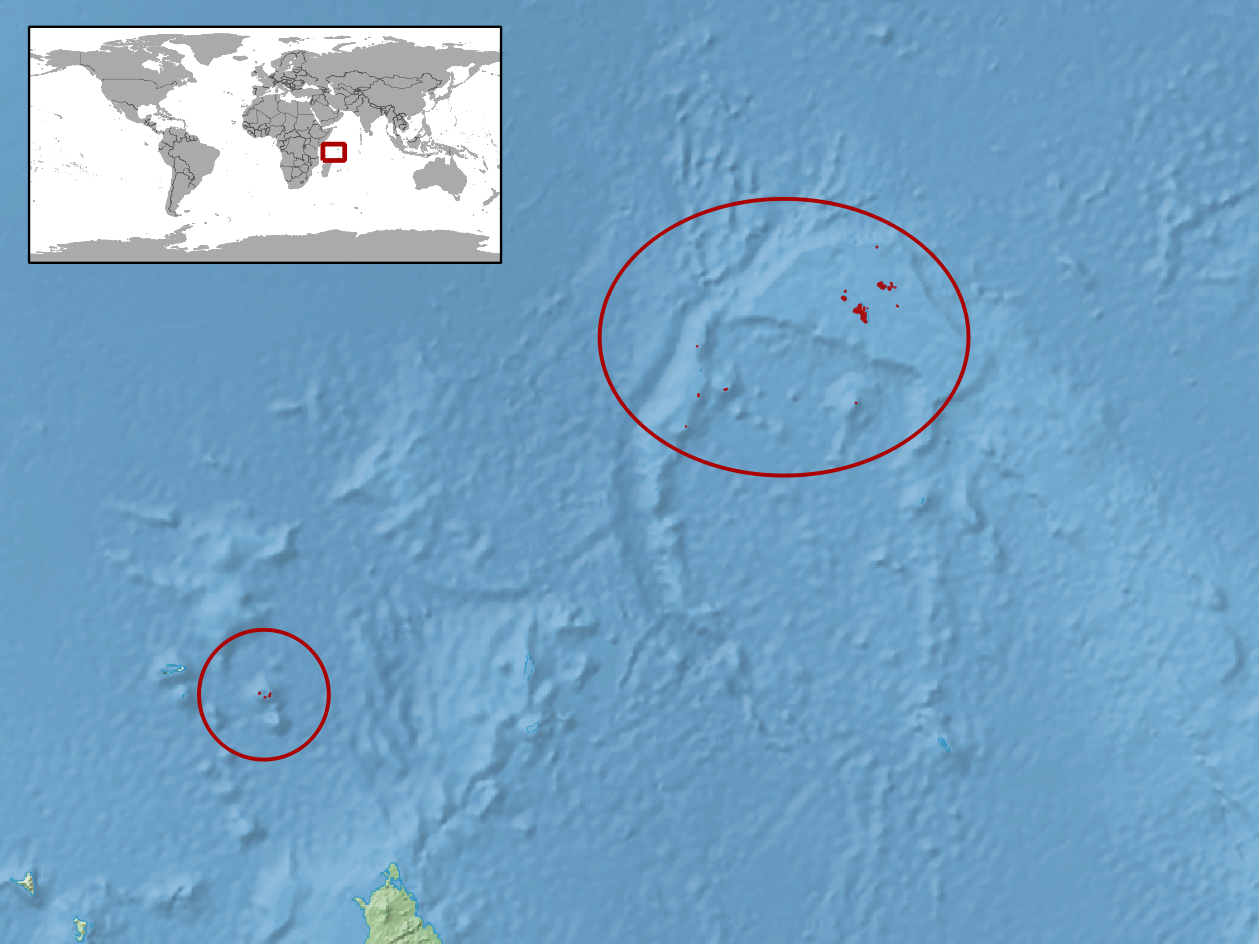

= Phelsuma sundbergi =

Species of lizard

Phelsuma sundbergi, commonly called the La Digue day gecko, Mahé day gecko, or Seychelles giant day gecko, is a species of lizard in the family Gekkonidae. The species is endemic to Seychelles and has three subspecies.

== Etymology ==
The specific name, sundbergi, is in honor of Swedish amateur ichthyologist Henrik Sundberg.

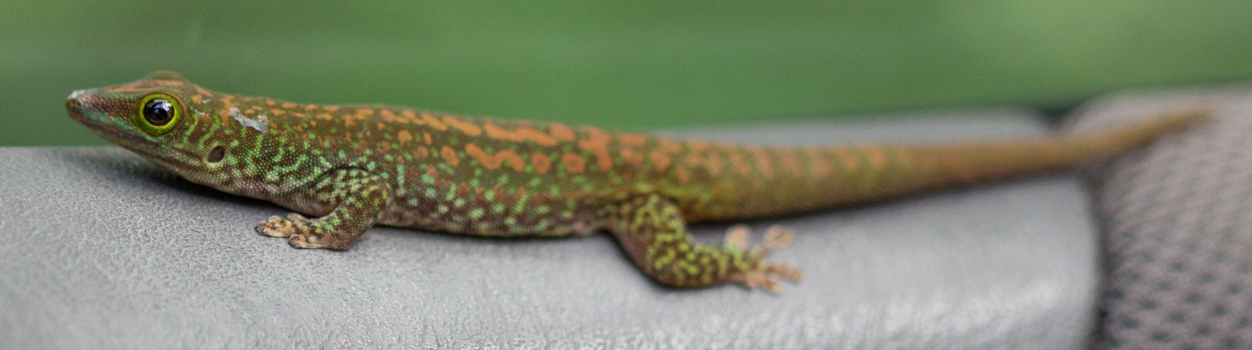
Phelsuma sundbergi longinsulae

== Habitat ==
The natural habitats of P. sundbergi are subtropical or tropical dry forests, subtropical or tropical moist lowland forests, subtropical or tropical moist montane forests, plantations, rural gardens, urban areas, and introduced vegetation.

== Conservation status ==
P. sundbergi is threatened by habitat loss.

== Reproduction ==
P. sundbergi is oviparous.

== Subspecies ==
Three subspecies are recognized as being valid, including the nominotypical subspecies.

Image	Subspecies	Common name
	Phelsuma sundbergi sundbergi Rendahl, 1939	Seychelles giant day gecko
	Phelsuma sundbergi ladiguensis Böhme & Meier, 1981	La Digue day gecko
	Phelsuma sundbergi longinsulae Rendahl, 1939	Mahé day gecko
