= Veun Sai District =

Veun Sai វើនសៃ
- District
- Location in Cambodia
- Coordinates: 14.1472°N 106.8173°E
- Country: Cambodia
- Province: Ratanakiri

Area
  - Total: 1,879.25 km^{2} (725.58 sq mi)

Population (2019)
  - Total: 22,910

Veun Sai (Khmer: វើនសៃ) is a district in Ratanakiri Province, Cambodia. The district center is located approximately 38 km (24 mi) north by road from the provincial capital Banlung, along the Tonlé San River. It covers an area of approximately 1,879.25 km^{2} (725.58 sq mi) and had a population of 22,910 in 2019. It is subdivided into nine communes and 34 villages.

== Geography ==
Veun Sai is one of the nine districts (srok) of Ratanakiri province, Cambodia. It covers an area of approximately 1,879.25 km^{2} (725.58 sq mi), of which 1,036.94 km^{2} (400.36 sq mi) was classified as forest land, 160.44 km^{2} (61.95 sq mi) as cultivation land, 3.52 km^{2} (1.36 sq mi) as construction land, and 678.32 km^{2} (261.90 sq mi) as other land in 2009. The district center is located approximately 38 km (24 mi) from the provincial capital Banlung. Located in the northern part of Ratanakiri Province, it shares an international border with Laos.

The district is located in the Tonlé San river basin, with 27 of its villages (phum) located along the river. The district is part of the area covered by Virachey National Park, which extends into Veun Sai and Ta Veaeng District in Ratanakiri Province and Siem Pang District in Stung Treng Province. The park is spread over 332,500 ha (822,000 acres), and was established in 1993. It was designated an ASEAN Heritage Park in 2003. The district also includes part of Veun Sai-Siem Pang National Park. The district belongs to the Central Annamites ecological zone. It has a monsoon climate, with a heavy rains during the monsoon season from May to September. During the rainy season, inhabitants traditionally move to agricultural fields and live in temporary settlements known as chamkar.

== Administration ==
The district is headed by a district governor. Veun Sai District is subdivided into nine communes (khum)–Ban Pong, Hat Pak, Ka Choun, Kaoh Pang, Kaoh Peak, Kok Lak, Pa Kalan, Phnum Kok, and Veun Sai. The communes are administrated by a commune council headed by a commune chief elected directly for a five year period. The communes are further subdivided into 34 villages (phum), which are each headed by a village chief, appointed by the corresponding commune council. Pong and Hat Pak are the closest communes to the district administration, located approximately 3 km (1.9 mi) away, while Phnum Kok and Veun Sai are the farthest, at approximately 40 km (25 mi).

| Khum (commune) | Phum (villages) |
|---|---|
| Ban Pong | Ban Pong, Ban Hvang |
| Hat Pak | Hat Pak, Veun Hay, Lam Poar |
| Ka Choun | Ka Choun Leu, Ka Choun Kraom, Vang, Vay, Tiem Leu, Kok Lak |
| Kaoh Pang | Pa Tang, Lam av, Pa Hay |
| Kaoh Peak | Kaoh Peak, Phak Nam, Khun |
| Kok Lak | La Lai, Rak, La Meuy, Trak |
| Pa Kalan | Pa Kalan, Kampong Cham |
| Phnum Kok | Phnum Kok Lav, Phnum Kok Prov, Kalai Ta Vang, Kalai Sapun, Tiem Kraom |
| Veun Sai | Veun Sai, Pak Kae, I Tub, Thmei, Ka Lan, Kang Nak |

== Demographics ==
According to the 1998 population census, Veun Sai District had a population of 12,389 including 6,055 males and 6,334 females. The district had 2,168 households, with an average household size of 5.7 persons. According to the 2008 census, the population had increased to 16,449. As per the 2019 census, the population was 22,910, including 11,660 males and 11,250 females. The district had 5,391 households, with an average household size of 4.2 persons.

In 2008, the indigenous population was 9,154, including 2,546 Kavet, 2,465 Kreung, 1,383 Praov, 1,140 Kachak, 953 Tampuan, 347 Charay, and 317 Lun. The district also had a substantial Lao minority population, recorded at 8,120 people in 2008, alongside 23 Vietnamese and 96 Khmer Muslims. Approximately 95% of families in the district were engaged primarily in agriculture, with 93% of the families engaged in rice cultivation. The rest of the families were engaged in services (3%), trade (3%), and hndicrafts (1%).

== See also ==
- Lygosoma veunsaiense
