= Korat supple skink =

Conservation status
- Least Concern (IUCN 3.1)

Scientific classification
- Kingdom: Animalia
- Phylum: Chordata
- Class: Reptilia
- Order: Squamata
- Family: Scincidae
- Genus: Lygosoma
- Species: L. koratense

Binomial name
- Lygosoma koratense Smith, 1917
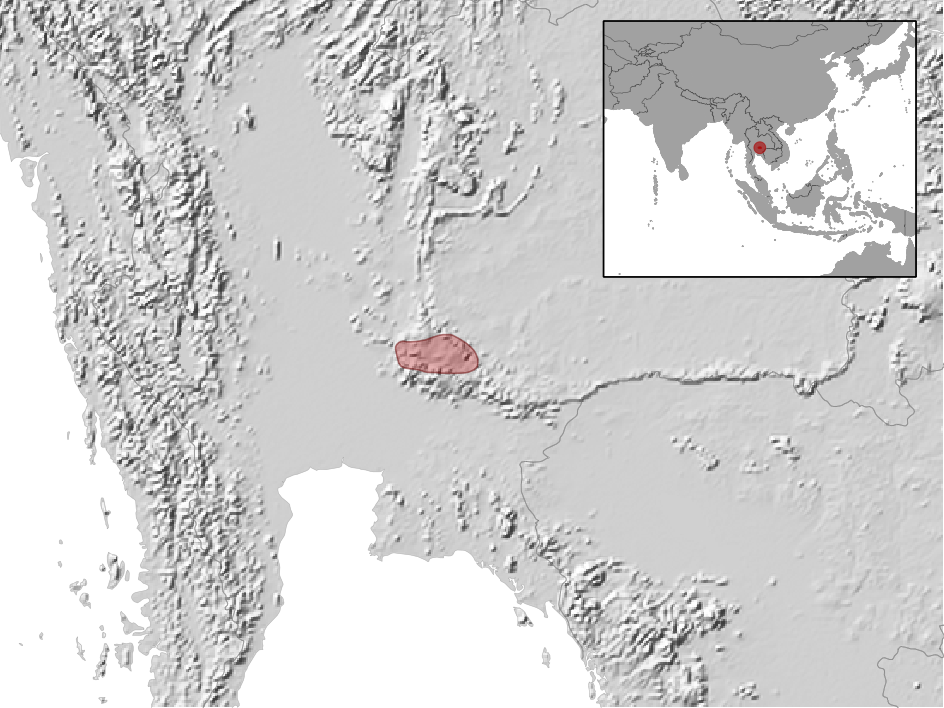

Species of lizard

The Korat supple skink or Koraten writhing skink (Lygosoma koratense) is a species of skink in the family Scincidae. It is endemic to Thailand.

It can live in many different environments, including montane evergreen rainforests and low limestone hills, and also intensively cultivated and degraded areas.
