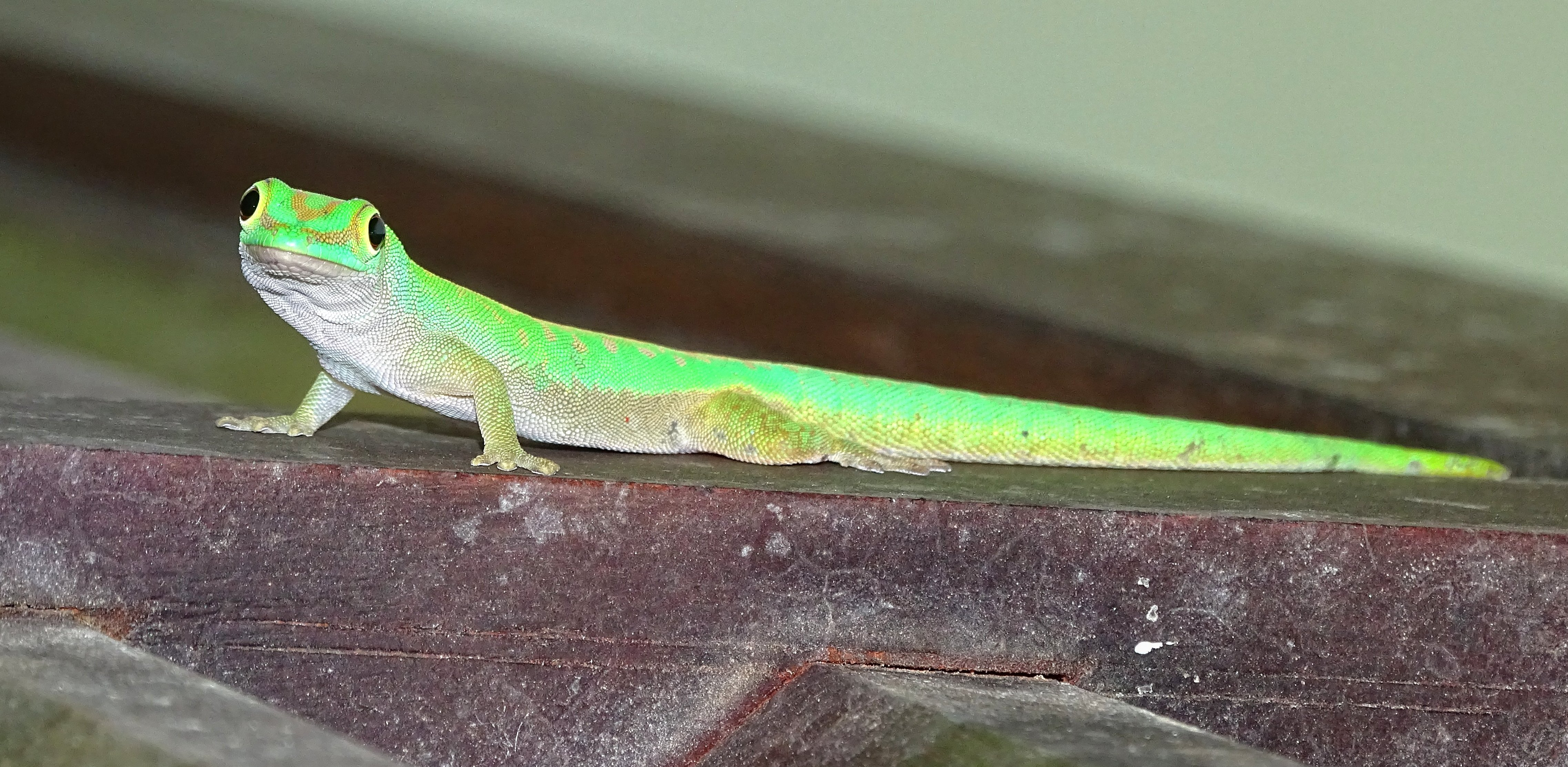

Conservation status
- Least Concern (IUCN 3.1)

Scientific classification
- Kingdom: Animalia
- Phylum: Chordata
- Class: Reptilia
- Order: Squamata
- Suborder: Gekkota
- Family: Gekkonidae
- Genus: Phelsuma
- Species: P. astriata

Binomial name
- Phelsuma astriata Tornier, 1901
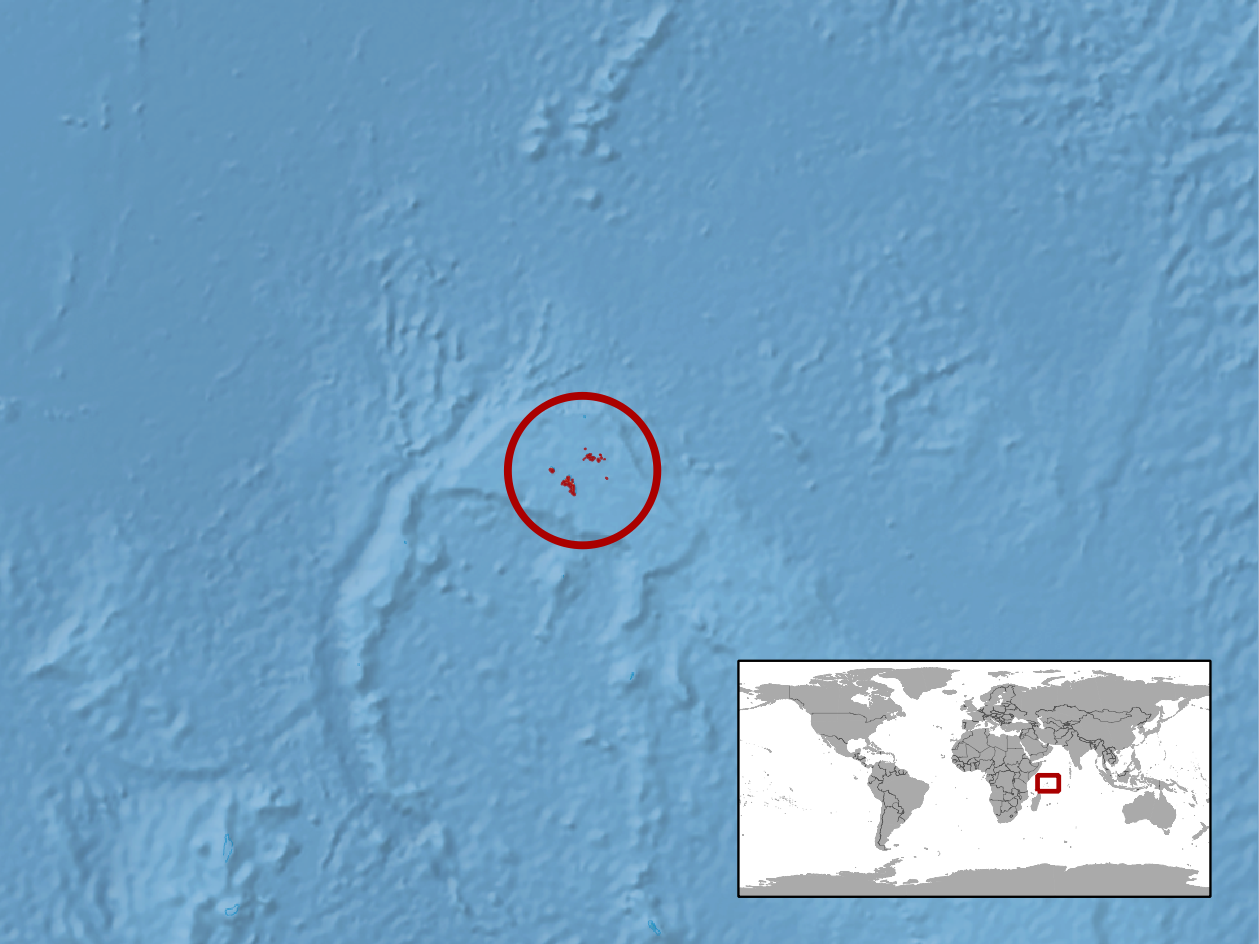

= Phelsuma astriata =

Species of lizard

Phelsuma astriata, the Seychelles (small) day gecko or stripeless day gecko is a species of lizard in the family Gekkonidae endemic to the Seychelles.

Its natural habitats are subtropical or tropical dry forests, subtropical or tropical moist lowland forest, subtropical or tropical mangrove forest, subtropical or tropical dry shrubland, subtropical or tropical moist shrubland, plantations, rural gardens, and urban areas. It is threatened by habitat loss. It lives in tropical areas. it eats vegetables of almost any kind.

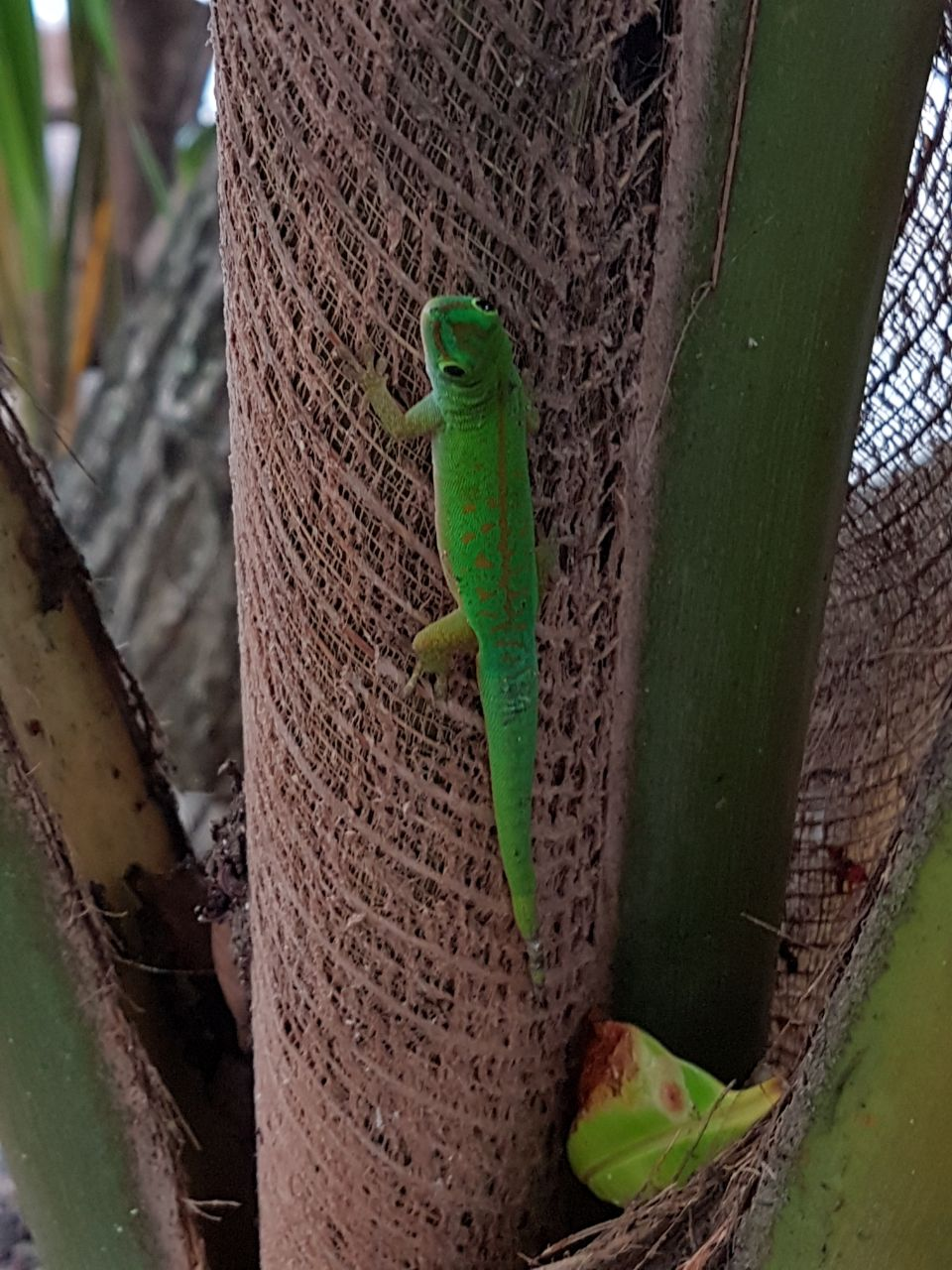
Phelsuma astriata.

These geckos possess the significant ability to dramatically change in colour intensity based on the presence or absence of light on or around them. The gecko appears bright green in light, but if kept in a dark place, even for a short period of time, its appearance darkens to an extremely dark green that could easily be mistaken for black when viewed in light. If a light is then shone on the gecko, a visual change seems to occur separately in each scale-like protuberance and gradually the entire gecko changes to a bright green in the light over a period of less than 3 minutes. The tail however changes slightly slower. During the change the gecko appears as a mottled bright and dark green simultaneously. See included images taken in Praslin, Seychelles.

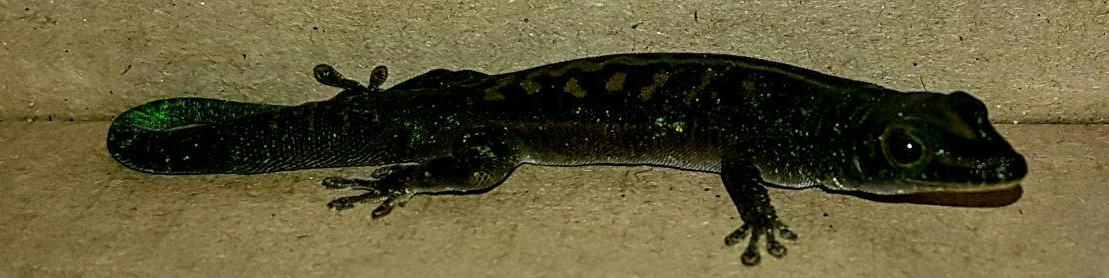
Phelsuma astriata showing extremely dark green colouration after being left in the dark for a short period of time.

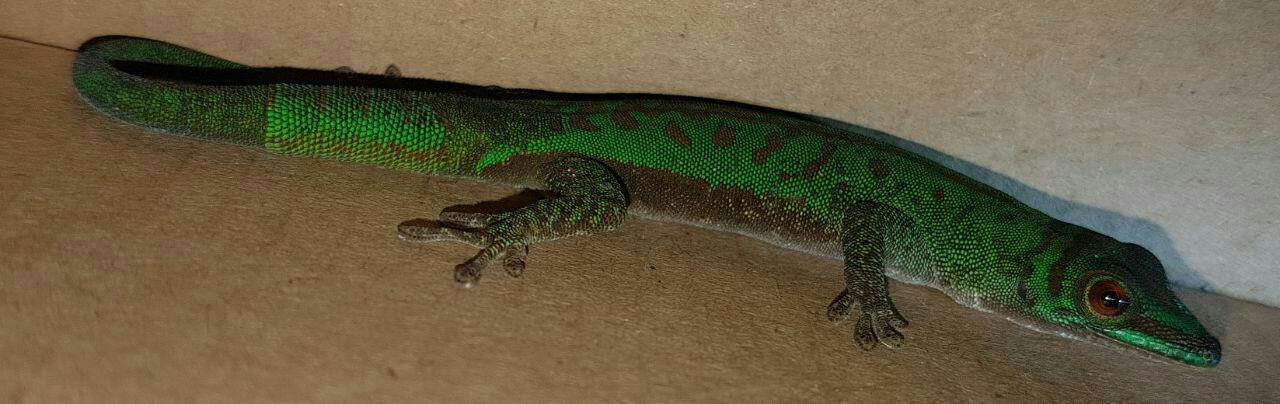
Phelsuma astriata showing change in colouration after exposure to light.

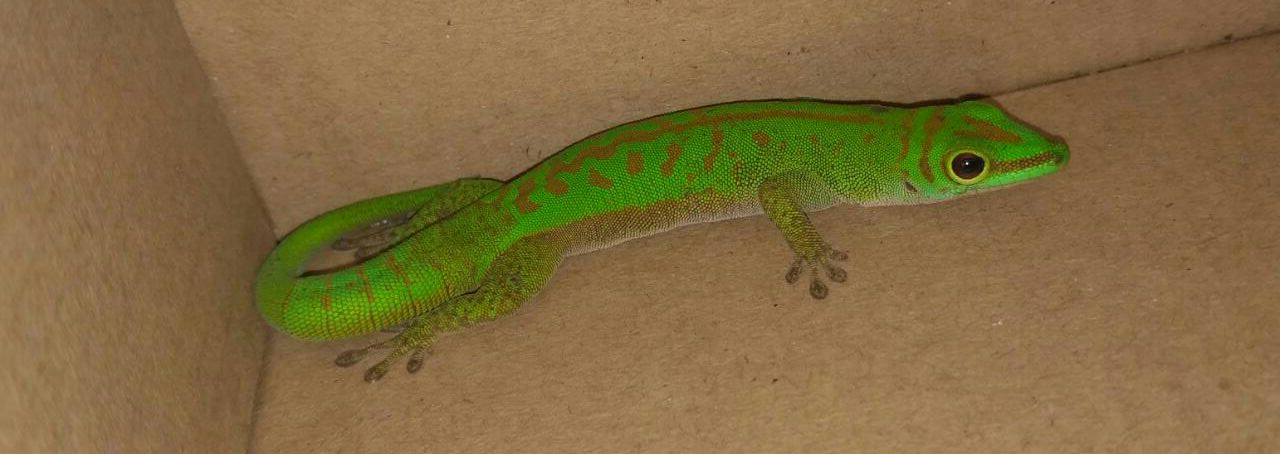
Phelsuma astriata showing bright green colouration as is normally visible in daylight.

== Subspecies ==
There are 3 subspecies of Phelsuma astriata.

- Phelsuma astriata astriata, Found on the islands of Mahé, Praslin, Silhouette, Thérèse, Astove, Frégate
- Phelsuma astriata semicarinata, northeastern islands of the Inner Seychelles, Denis Island, Daros Island, St. Joseph and La Réunion (introduced)
- Phelsuma astriata astovei, Astove
