= Phnum Kok =

Phnum Kok ភ្នំកុក
- Commune
- Location within Cambodia
- Coordinates: 13°56′00″N 106°47′00″E
- Country: Cambodia
- Province: Ratanakiri Province
- District: Veun Sai
- Villages: 5

Population (1998)
  - Total: 889
- Time zone: UTC+07
- Geocode: 160909

Phnum Kok (Khmer: ភ្នំកុក) is a commune in Veun Sai District in northeast Cambodia. It contains five villages and has a population of 889. In the 2007 commune council elections, all five seats went to members of the Cambodian People's Party.

== Villages ==
Village	Population (1998)	Sex ratio (male/female) (1998)	Number of households (1998)
Kok Lav	188	1.14	28
Kok Prov	187	0.97	30
Kalai Ta Rueng	133	1.18	25
Kalai	144	0.95	23
Tiem Kraom	237	0.88	29
