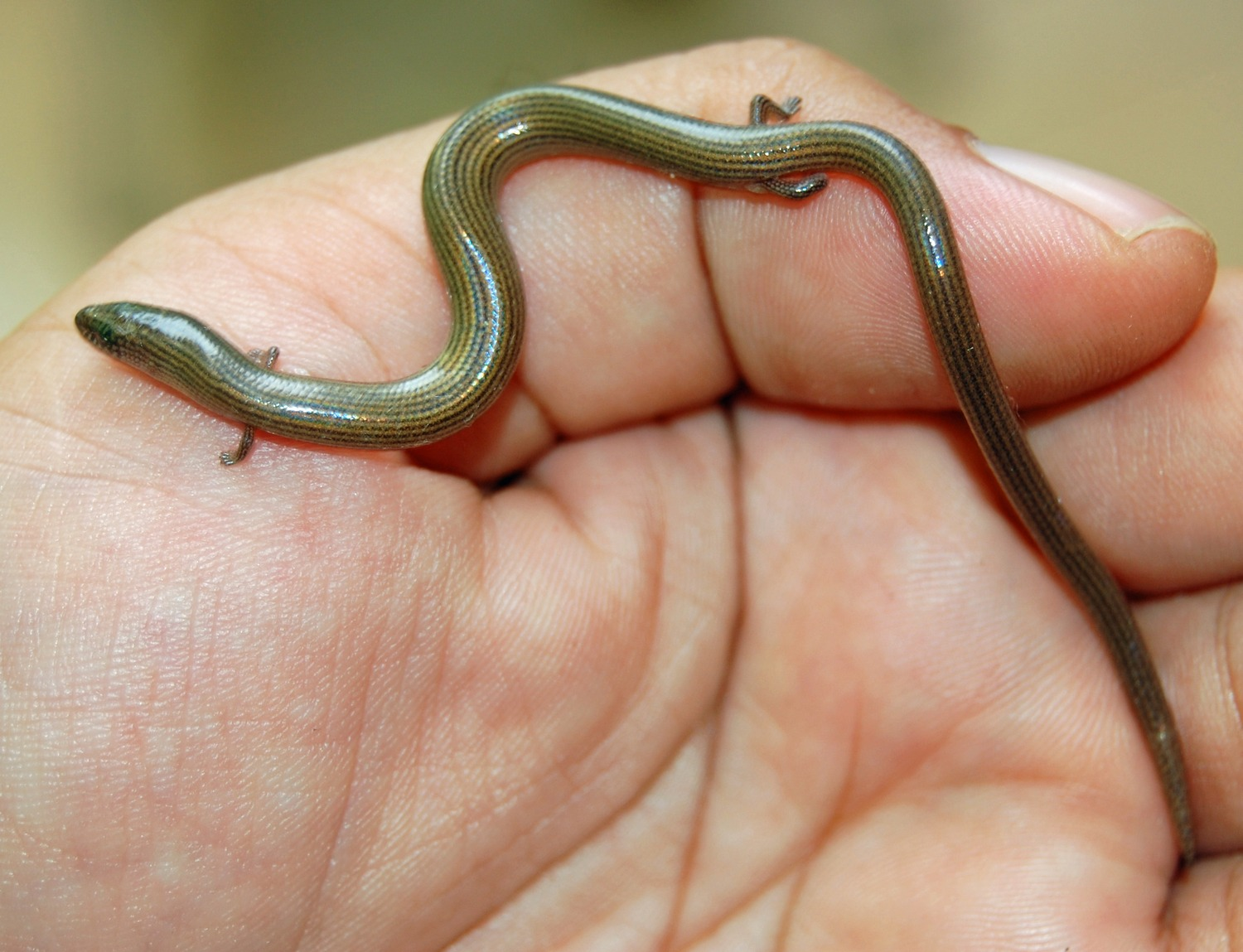
- Lygosoma quadrupes

Scientific classification
- Kingdom: Animalia
- Phylum: Chordata
- Class: Reptilia
- Order: Squamata
- Family: Scincidae
- Subfamily: Lygosominae
- Genus: Lygosoma; Hardwicke & Gray, 1828

Type species
- Anguis quadrupes Linnaeus, 1766

Species
- 16, see text

= Lygosoma =

Genus of lizards

Lygosoma is a genus of lizards, commonly known as supple skinks or writhing skinks, which are members of the family Scincidae. Lygosoma is the type genus of the subfamily Lygosominae. The common name, writhing skinks, refers to the way these stubby-legged animals move, snake-like but more slowly and more awkwardly.

== Geographic range ==
Species of Lygosoma are found in India to southeast Asia.

== Taxonomy ==
In the late 19th and early 20th century, Lygosoma was used as a "wastebin taxon", to which almost every newly described skink was assigned.

Which specific species are contained within this genus is controversial because of its unresolved historic relation to two other closely related genera: Mochlus and Lepidothyris. Currently, there are 16 known species in Lygosoma, 15 known species in Mochlus, and three known species in Lepidothyris. However, some species under the latter two genera are often listed under Lygosoma, and Lygosoma was recently found to be paraphyletic to the other two genera based on phylogenetic studies. To clear up this confusion, all species (49) pertaining to these three genera are classified as Lygosoma s.l. and the known 16 species under Lygosoma are classified as Lygosoma s.s.

After performing extensive phylogenetic analyses (genetic and molecular, species tree, and morphological anaylses), the classification of Lygosoma s.l. was further revised to containing four genera: Lygosoma (Southeast Asian writhing skinks), Mochlus (African supple skinks), Riopa (Asian gracile skinks), and Subdoluseps gen. nov. (Asian agile skinks). Genus Lygosoma s.s. was found to be separated into three clades instead of being a monophyletic group in relation to other genera within Lygosoma s.l., which in turn renamed this genus to Lygosoma and contains species that have Lygosoma quadrupes as their common ancestor. Mochlus was also found to be paraphyletic to Lepidothyris, making it not a monophyletic group and ultimately grouping genera Mochlus and Lepidothyris as one genus, Mochlus. Riopa was a recently discovered genus from about 11 years ago and was supported as a monophyletic group within Lygosoma s.l., and Subdoluseps gen. nov. is also a newly added genus to this group.

== Species ==
The following species are recognized.

- Lygosoma angeli (M.A. Smith, 1937) – Angel's writhing skink
- Lygosoma bampfyldei Bartlett, 1895 – Bampfylde's supple skink, Bampfylde's writhing skink
- Lygosoma boehmei Ziegler et al., 2007
- Lygosoma corpulentum M.A. Smith, 1921 – fat skink
- Lygosoma haroldyoungi (Taylor, 1962) – banded supple skink, Harold's writhing skink, Harold Young's supple skink
- Lygosoma isodactylum (Günther, 1864) – Siamese writhing skink, even-toed supple skink
- Lygosoma kinabatanganense Grismer, Quah, Duzulkafly & Yambun, 2018 – Kinabatangan supple skink
- Lygosoma koratense M.A. Smith, 1917 – Korat supple skink, Koraten writhing skink
- Lygosoma opisthorhodum F. Werner, 1910
- Lygosoma peninsulare Grismer, Quah, Duzulkafly & Yambun, 2018
- Lygosoma quadrupes (Linnaeus, 1766) – short-limbed supple skink, Linnaeus's writhing skink
- Lygosoma schneideri F. Werner, 1900 – Sumatran supple skink
- Lygosoma siamense Siler, Heitz, Davis, Freitas, Aowphol, Termprayoon & Grismer, 2018 – Siamese supple skink
- Lygosoma singha (Taylor, 1950)
- Lygosoma tabonorum Heitz, Diesmos, Freitas, Ellsworth & Grismer, 2016 – Palawan supple skink
- Lygosoma veunsaiense Geissler, Hartmann & Neang, 2012

Nota bene: A binomial authority in parentheses indicates that the species was originally described in a genus other than Lygosoma.
