= Lygosoma peninsulare =

Scientific classification
- Kingdom: Animalia
- Phylum: Chordata
- Class: Reptilia
- Order: Squamata
- Family: Scincidae
- Genus: Lygosoma
- Species: L. peninsulare

Binomial name
- Lygosoma peninsulare Grismer, Quah, Duzulkafly, & Yambun, 2018

Species of skink found in Malaysia

Lygosoma peninsulare is a species of skink found in Malaysia.
