= Kok Lak =

Commune in Veun Sai District, Ratanakiri Province, Cambodia

Kok Lak កុកឡាក់
- Commune
- Location within Cambodia
- Coordinates: 14°00′34″N 106°52′19″E
- Country: Cambodia
- Province: Ratanakiri Province
- District: Veun Sai
- Villages: 4

Population (1998)
  - Total: 1,312
- Time zone: UTC+07
- Geocode: 160907

Kok Lak (Khmer: កុកឡាក់) is a commune in Veun Sai District in northeast Cambodia. It contains four villages and has a population of 1312. In the 2007 commune council elections, all five seats went to members of the Cambodian People's Party. Land alienation is a problem of moderate severity in Kok Lak. (See Ratanakiri Province for background information on land alienation.)

== Villages ==
Village	Population (1998)	Sex ratio (male/female) (1998)	Number of households (1998)
La Lai	267	0.95	54
Rak	451	0.93	105
La Meuy	401	1.02	76
Trak	193	0.97	44
