= Lygosoma angeli =

Conservation status
- Least Concern (IUCN 3.1)

Scientific classification
- Kingdom: Animalia
- Phylum: Chordata
- Class: Reptilia
- Order: Squamata
- Family: Scincidae
- Genus: Lygosoma
- Species: L. angeli

Binomial name
- Lygosoma angeli (M.A. Smith, 1937)

Synonyms
- Riopa angeli M.A. Smith, 1937; Lygosoma angeli — Greer, 1977

Species of lizard

Lygosoma angeli, also known commonly as Angel's writhing skink, is a species of lizard in the family Scincidae. The species is native to Southeast Asia.

== Etymology ==
The specific name, angeli, is in honor of French herpetologist Fernand Angel.

== Geographic range ==
L. angeli is found in Cambodia, Laos, Thailand, and Vietnam.

== Habitat ==
The preferred natural habitats of L. angeli are forest and freshwater wetlands, at altitudes of 104–167 m (341–548 ft).

== Description ==
Dorsally, L. angeli is brown, reddish brown, or dark brown. Ventrally, it is tan. It may attain a snout-to-vent length (SVL) of 11 cm (4.3 in). The tail length equals SVL.

== Behavior ==
L. angeli is terrestrial and fossorial. It hides under bark of trees and stumps. It also burrows in loose soil and under fallen logs.

== Reproduction ==
The mode of reproduction of L. angeli is unknown.
