= Lygosoma schneideri =

Scientific classification
- Kingdom: Animalia
- Phylum: Chordata
- Class: Reptilia
- Order: Squamata
- Family: Scincidae
- Genus: Lygosoma
- Species: L. schneideri

Binomial name
- Lygosoma schneideri F. Werner, 1900

Species of lizard

Lygosoma schneideri, also known commonly as Schneider's writhing skink and the Sumatran supple skink, is a species of lizard in the family Scincidae. The species is endemic to Indonesia.

== Etymology ==
The specific name, schneideri, is in honor of Gustav Schneider, Jr., who collected the holotype.

== Geographic range ==
L. schneideri is found on the island of Sumatra in western Indonesia.

== Description ==
Relatively large and stout for its genus, the holotype of L. schneideri has a snout-to-vent length of 12.6 cm (5.0 in) and a tail 9.6 cm (3.8 in) long.
