= Kaoh Pang =

Commune in Veun Sai District, Cambodia

Kaoh Pang កោះប៉ង់
- Commune
- Location within Cambodia
- Coordinates: 14°04′00″N 106°58′00″E
- Country: Cambodia
- Province: Ratanakiri Province
- District: Veun Sai
- Villages: 3

Population (1998)
  - Total: 545
- Time zone: UTC+07
- Geocode: 160905

Kaoh Pang (Khmer: កោះប៉ង់) is a commune in Veun Sai District in northeast Cambodia. It contains three villages and has a population of 545. In the 2007 commune council elections, all five seats went to members of the Cambodian People's Party. Land alienation is a problem of low severity in Kaoh Pang. (See Ratanakiri Province for background information on land alienation.)

== Villages ==
| Village | Population (1998) | Sex ratio (male/female) (1998) | Number of households (1998) |
|---|---|---|---|
| Pa Daeng | 225 | 0.97 | 39 |
| Lam Av | 201 | 0.91 | 26 |
| Pa Hoy (or Pa Hay) | 119 | 0.86 | 22 |
