= Ka Choun =

Commune in Veun Sai District, Ratanakiri Province, Cambodia

Ka Choun កាចូន
- Commune
- Location within Cambodia
- Coordinates: 13.9666°N 106.8833°E
- Country: Cambodia
- Province: Ratanakiri Province
- District: Veun Sai
- Villages: 6

Population (1998)
  - Total: 1,397
- Time zone: UTC+07
- Geocode: 160904

Ka Choun (Khmer: កាចូន) is a commune in Veun Sai District in northeast Cambodia. It contains six villages and has a population of 1,397. In the 2007 commune council elections, all five seats went to members of the Cambodian People's Party. Land alienation is a problem of moderate severity in Ka Choun. (See Ratanakiri Province for background information on land alienation.)

== Villages ==
Village	Population (1998)	Sex ratio (male/female) (1998)	Number of households (1998)
Ka Choun Leu	341	1.02	61
Ka Choun Kraom	319	1.04	54
Vang	143	0.93	29
Vay	103	0.84	20
Tiem Leu	239	1.03	44
Ka Lim	252	1.15	56
