= Lygosoma tabonorum =

Conservation status
- Least Concern (IUCN 3.1)

Scientific classification
- Kingdom: Animalia
- Phylum: Chordata
- Class: Reptilia
- Order: Squamata
- Family: Scincidae
- Genus: Lygosoma
- Species: L. tabonorum

Binomial name
- Lygosoma tabonorum Heitz, Diesmos, Freitas, Ellsworth, & Grismer, 2016

Species of lizard

The Palawan supple skink (Lygosoma tabonorum) is a species of skink found in the Philippines.
