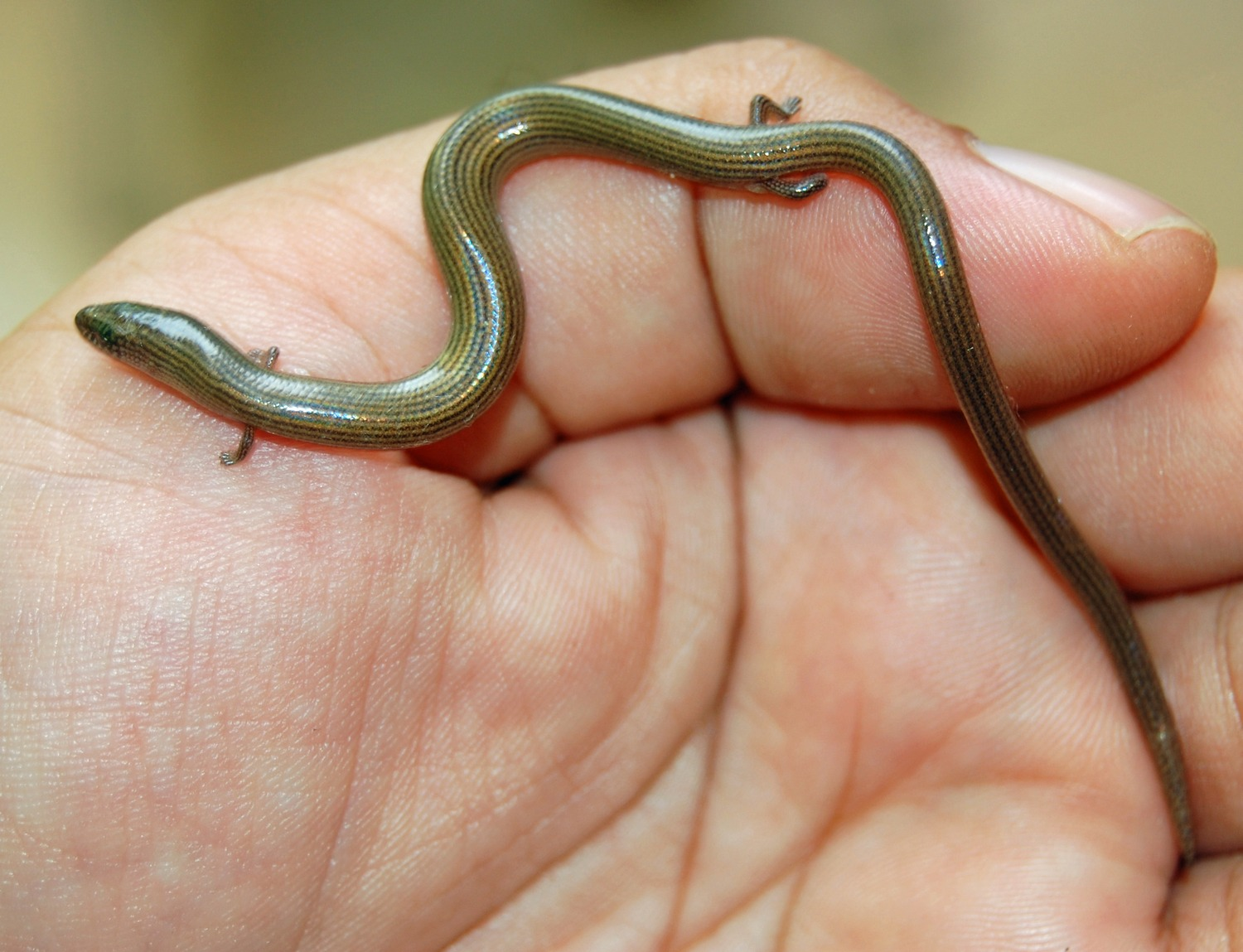

Scientific classification
- Kingdom: Animalia
- Phylum: Chordata
- Class: Reptilia
- Order: Squamata
- Family: Scincidae
- Genus: Lygosoma
- Species: L. quadrupes

Binomial name
- Lygosoma quadrupes (Linnaeus, 1766)

Synonyms
- Anguis quadrupes Linnaeus, 1766

= Lygosoma quadrupes =

Species of lizard

The short-limbed supple skink or Linnaeus's writhing skink (Lygosoma quadrupes) is a species of skink which is found widely in southern China, Hong Kong, and Southeast Asia (Thailand, Cambodia, Laos, Vietnam, West Malaysia, Indonesia (Sumatra, Java, Salayar), and the Philippines (Palawan, Calamian Islands)).
