= Kaoh Peak =

Commune in Veun Sai District, Ratanakiri Province, Cambodia

Kaoh Peak កោះពាក្យ
- Commune
- Location within Cambodia
- Coordinates: 14°01′10″N 106°56′22″E
- Country: Cambodia
- Province: Ratanakiri Province
- District: Veun Sai
- Villages: 3

Population (1998)
  - Total: 2,087
- Time zone: UTC+07
- Geocode: 160906

Kaoh Peak (Khmer: កោះពាក្យ) is a commune in Veun Sai District in northeast Cambodia. It contains three villages and has a population of 2,087. In the 2007 commune council elections, all five seats went to members of the Cambodian People's Party. Land alienation is a problem of moderate severity in Kaoh Peak. (See Ratanakiri Province for background information on land alienation.)

== Villages ==
Village	Population (1998)	Sex ratio (male/female) (1998)	Number of households (1998)
Kaoh Peak	773	1.02	95
Phak Nam	882	0.82	184
Khuon	432	0.89	90
