= Lygosoma isodactylum =

Conservation status
- Data Deficient (IUCN 3.1)

Scientific classification
- Kingdom: Animalia
- Phylum: Chordata
- Class: Reptilia
- Order: Squamata
- Family: Scincidae
- Genus: Lygosoma
- Species: L. isodactylum

Binomial name
- Lygosoma isodactylum (Günther, 1864)

Species of lizard

The Siamese writhing skink or even-toed supple skink (Lygosoma isodactylum) is a species of skink found in Cambodia and Thailand.
