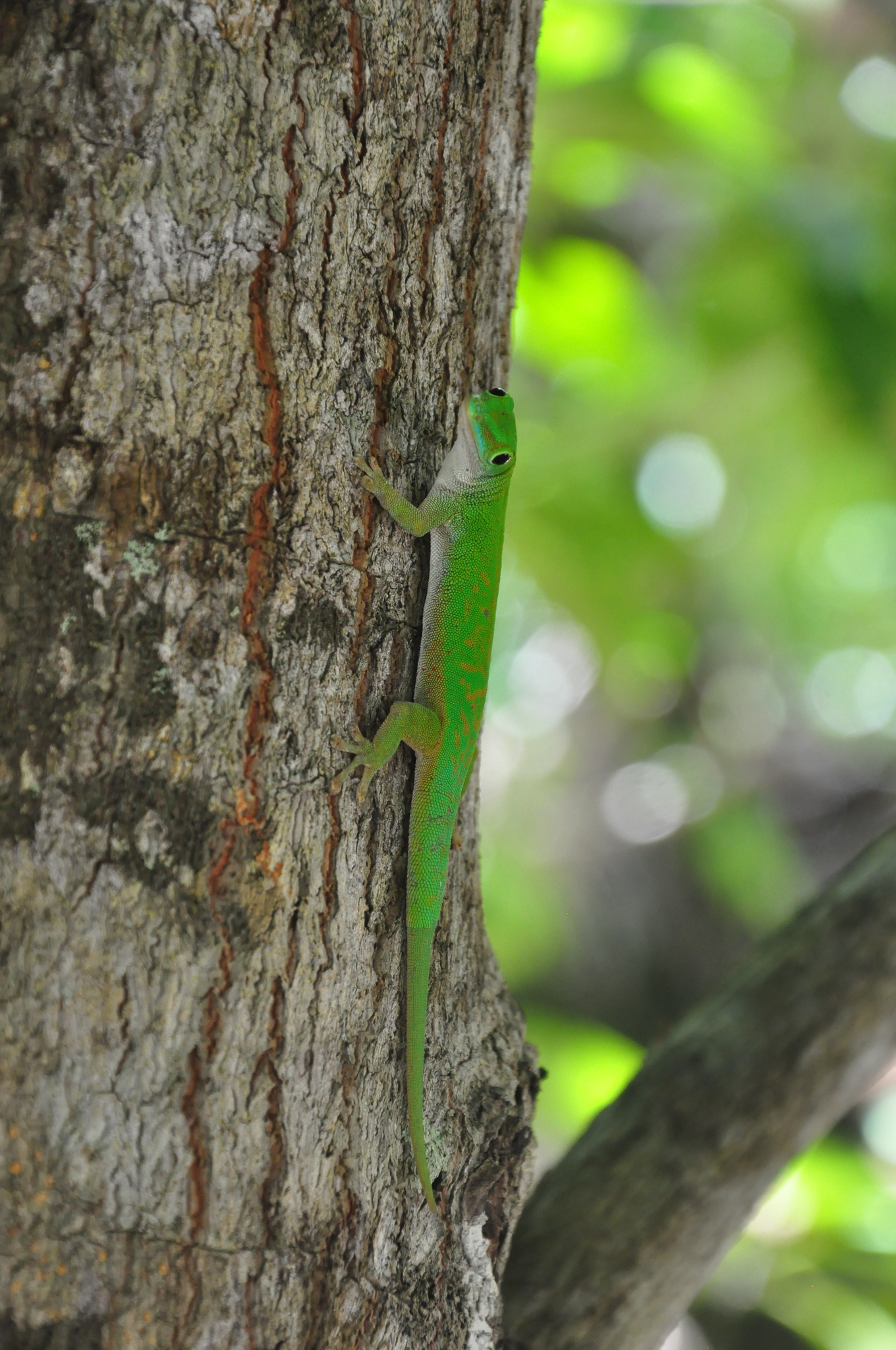

Scientific classification
- Domain: Eukaryota
- Kingdom: Animalia
- Phylum: Chordata
- Class: Reptilia
- Order: Squamata
- Infraorder: Gekkota
- Family: Gekkonidae
- Genus: Phelsuma
- Species: P. astriata
- Subspecies: P. a. semicarinata

Trinomial name
- Phelsuma astriata semicarinata Cheke, 1976

Synonyms
- Phelsuma astriata - Kluge, 1993

= Phelsuma astriata semicarinata =

Subspecies of lizard

Phelsuma astriata semicarinata is a subspecies of Seychelles day gecko. It is a small, slender gecko, has a bright green colour and feeds on insects. It is found on different islands of the Seychelles, where it often lives near human dwellings.

== Description ==
The body of this smallish day gecko is lime green with rost-coloured dots and bars on the back which are irregularly shaped. Those reddish dots form a thin mid-dorsdal stripe, which may be broken and may have some bars extending from it. There is a rust-coloured stripe between the nostril and the eye. On the head there is a rust-coloured, v-shaped marking with two transverse bars. Males often have a bluish or turquoise coloured tail and lower back. On both sides of the snout, a reddish-brown stripe is extending from the nostrils to the eye. The undersurface of the body is white. These lizards reach a total length of about 12.5 cm.

== Distribution ==
This gecko is endemic to the Seychelles island Praslin but it has also been introduced to La Réunion, where it had been recorded first in 2004.

== Habitat ==
This species is typically found on coconut palms and banana trees. It often lives near human settlements.

== Diet ==
These day geckos feed on insects, small spiders, fruit, nectar and pollen.

== Reproduction ==
Phelsuma astriata semicarinata normally lays two 10 mm large eggs. The eggs are not glued to leaves, as this species is among the "non-gluer" variety. Eggs should generally hatch in 70 – 75 days and should be incubated at approximately 25 degrees Celsius.

== Care and maintenance in captivity ==
Phelsuma astriata semicarinata should be housen in pairs. They need a vertically oriented and well planted terrarium with vertically oriented and horizontally oriented bambus sticks as thick as a thumb.

== Bibliography ==
- Henkel, F.-W. and W. Schmidt (1995) Amphibien und Reptilien Madagaskars, der Maskarenen, Seychellen und Komoren. Ulmer Stuttgart. ISBN 3-8001-7323-9
- McKeown, Sean (1993) The general care and maintenance of day geckos. Advanced Vivarium Systems, Lakeside CA.
