= Lygosoma siamense =

Conservation status
- Least Concern (IUCN 3.1)

Scientific classification
- Kingdom: Animalia
- Phylum: Chordata
- Class: Reptilia
- Order: Squamata
- Family: Scincidae
- Genus: Lygosoma
- Species: L. siamense

Binomial name
- Lygosoma siamense Siler, Heitz, Davis, Freitas, Aowphol, Termprayoon, & Grismer, 2018

Species of lizard

Lygosoma siamense, the Siamese supple skink, is a species of skink found in Vietnam, Laos, Cambodia, Thailand, and Peninsular Malaysia.
