= Gloydius halys mogoi =

Scientific classification
- Kingdom: Animalia
- Phylum: Chordata
- Class: Reptilia
- Order: Squamata
- Suborder: Serpentes
- Family: Viperidae
- Genus: Gloydius
- Species: G. halys
- Subspecies: G. h. mogoi

Trinomial name
- Gloydius halys mogoi Bour, 1993

Subspecies of Asian snake

Gloydius halys mogoi, or the Siberian Pitviper, is a subspecies of Halys pitviper from Mongolia and Siberia. As with all pit vipers, it is venomous.

== Taxonomy ==
The status of Gloydius halys mogoi is controversial, with some researchers believing it should be a junior synonym of G. h. halys, while others believe it is a full subspecies.

== Description ==
Gloydius halys mogoi can be distinguished from its sister subspecies by its specific scale counts and apical pits visible under a microscope.

== Reproduction ==
Glydius halys mogoi is known to be viviparous.
