= Lygosoma bampfyldei =

Conservation status
- Data Deficient (IUCN 3.1)

Scientific classification
- Kingdom: Animalia
- Phylum: Chordata
- Class: Reptilia
- Order: Squamata
- Family: Scincidae
- Genus: Lygosoma
- Species: L. bampfyldei

Binomial name
- Lygosoma bampfyldei Bartlett, 1895

Synonyms
- Lygosoma bampfyldei Bartlett, 1895; Riopa bampfyldei — M.A. Smith, 1937; Mochlus bampfyldei — Mittleman, 1952; Riopa bampfyldei — Chan-ard et al., 1999; Lygosoma bampfyldei — Das & Yakoob, 2007

Species of lizard

Lygosoma bampfyldei, commonly known as Bampfylde's supple skink or Bampfylde's writhing skink, is a species of lizard in the subfamily Lygosominae of the family Scincidae. The species is endemic to Malaysia.

== Etymology ==
The specific name, bampfyldei, is in honor of Charles Agar Bampfylde (1856–1918), who was head of government of the Raj of Sarawak (1896–1903).

== Geographic range ==
L. bampfyldei is found in eastern Malaysia (Sabah and Sarawak).

== Habitat ==
The preferred natural habitat of L. bampfyldei is lowland forest.

== Behavior ==
L. bampfyldei is terrestrial and fossorial.

== Reproduction ==
The mode of reproduction of L. bampfyldei is unknown.
