= Lygosoma opisthorhodum =

Scientific classification
- Domain: Eukaryota
- Kingdom: Animalia
- Phylum: Chordata
- Class: Reptilia
- Order: Squamata
- Family: Scincidae
- Genus: Lygosoma
- Species: L. opisthorhodum

Binomial name
- Lygosoma opisthorhodum Werner, 1910

Synonyms
- Riopa opisthorhodum

Species of skink found in Indonesia

Lygosoma opisthorhodum is a species of skink found in Indonesia.
