= Gloydius halys boehmei =

Scientific classification
- Kingdom: Animalia
- Phylum: Chordata
- Order: Squamata
- Suborder: Serpentes
- Family: Viperidae
- Genus: Gloydius
- Species: G. halys
- Subspecies: G. h. boehmei

Trinomial name
- Gloydius halys boehmei Nilson, 1983

Subspecies of Afghan snake

Gloydius halys boehmei, or the Böhme's pitviper, is a subspecies of Halys pitviper from Eastern Afghanistan. As with all pit vipers, it is venomous.

== Description ==
A small viper, growing up to 48.7 cm, Böhme's pitviper is often distinguished by its lack of apical pits, specific scale counts and 41 dark bands.

== Reproduction ==
Glydius halys boehmei is known to be viviparous.
