= Lygosoma singha =

Sri Lanka Supple Skink

Conservation status
- Data Deficient (IUCN 3.1)

Scientific classification
- Kingdom: Animalia
- Phylum: Chordata
- Class: Reptilia
- Order: Squamata
- Family: Scincidae
- Genus: Lygosoma
- Species: L. singha

Binomial name
- Lygosoma singha (Taylor, 1950)
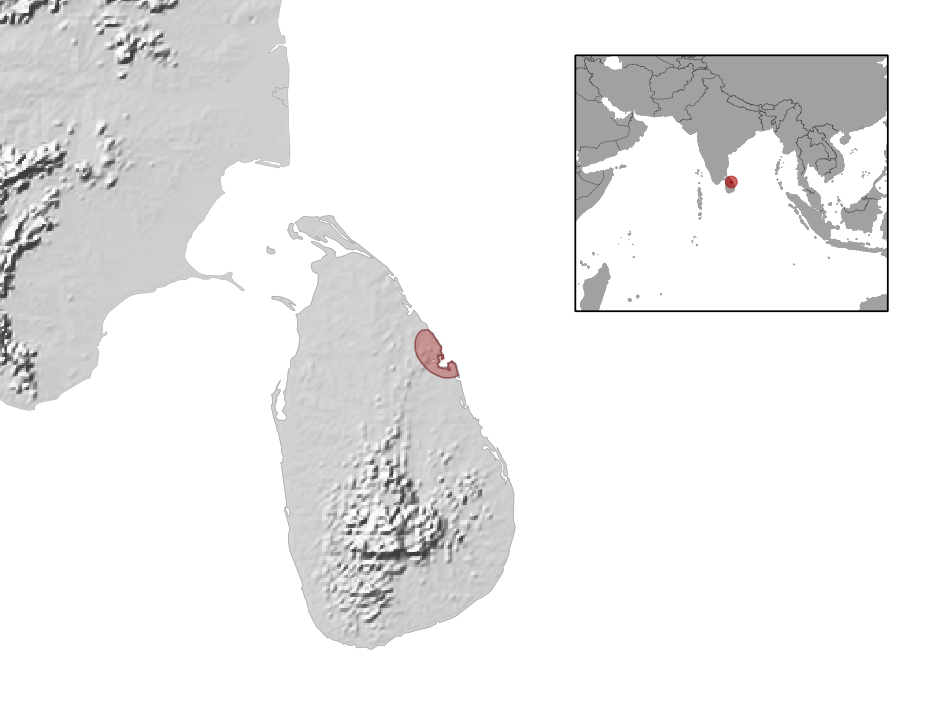

Species of lizard

Lygosoma singha is a species of skink that is endemic to the island of Sri Lanka.

== Habitat and distribution ==
It is presumably a semi-fossorial skink endemic to Sri Lanka's north-east coast.

== Ecology and diet ==
Lygosoma singha inhabits areas under 50 metres of elevation, and its diet may include insects.
