= Pa Kalan =

Pa Kalan ប៉ាកាឡាន់
- Commune
- Location within Cambodia
- Coordinates: 13°57′00″N 106°46′00″E
- Country: Cambodia
- Province: Ratanakiri Province
- District: Veun Sai
- Villages: 2

Population (1998)
  - Total: 943
- Time zone: UTC+07
- Geocode: 160908

Pa Kalan (Khmer: ប៉ាកាឡាន់) is a commune in Veun Sai District in northeast Cambodia. It contains two villages and has a population of 943. In the 2007 commune council elections, four seats went to members of the Cambodian People's Party and one seat went to a member of Funcinpec. Land alienation is a problem of low severity in Pa Kalan. (See Ratanakiri Province for background information on land alienation.)

== Villages ==
Village	Population (1998)	Sex ratio (male/female) (1998)	Number of households (1998)
Pa Kalan	624	0.87	109
Kampong Cham	319	1.1	58
