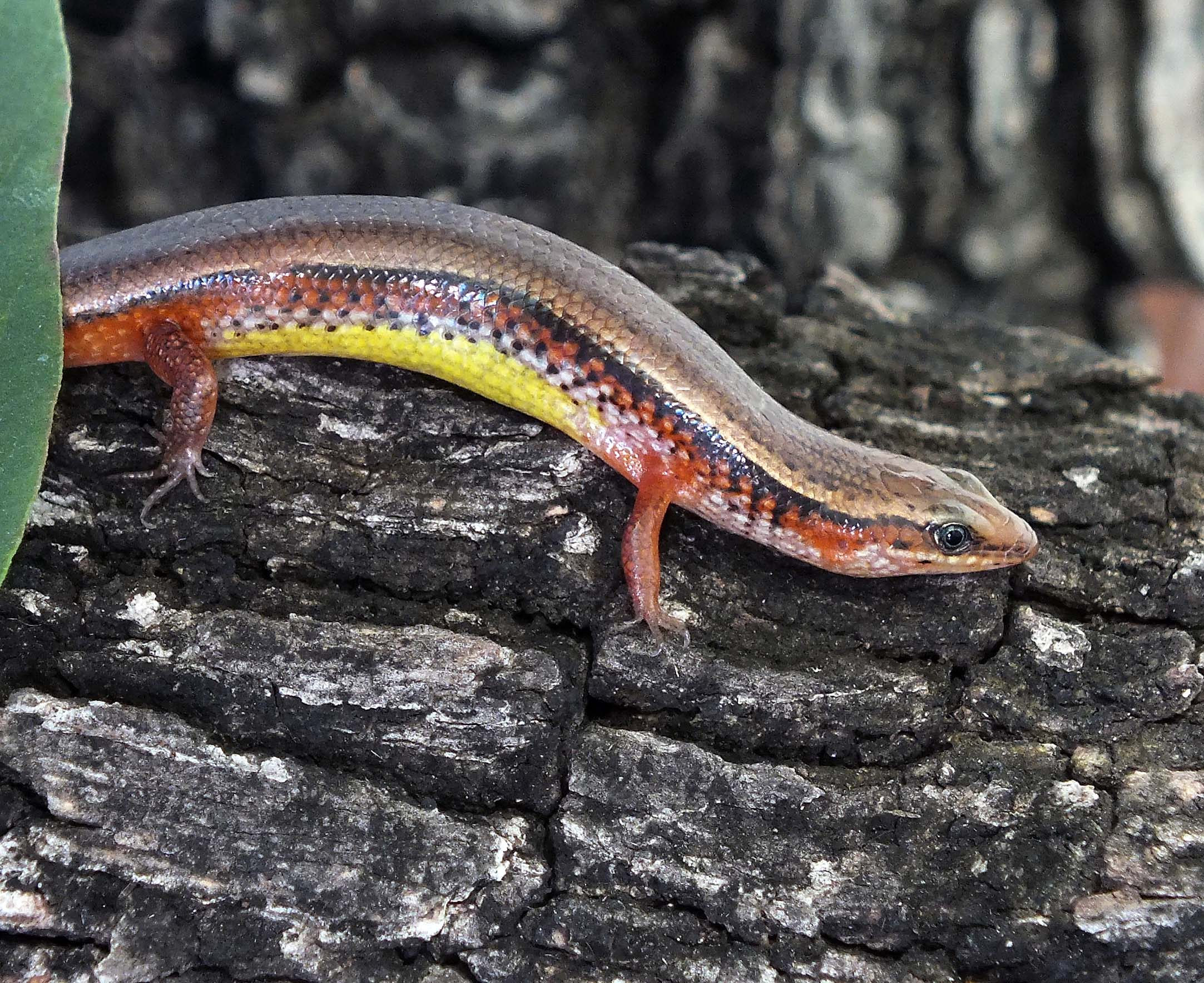

Conservation status
- Least Concern (IUCN 3.1)

Scientific classification
- Kingdom: Animalia
- Phylum: Chordata
- Class: Reptilia
- Order: Squamata
- Family: Scincidae
- Genus: Lygosoma
- Species: L. corpulentum

Binomial name
- Lygosoma corpulentum Smith, 1921

= Lygosoma corpulentum =

Species of lizard

The fat skink (Lygosoma corpulentum) is a species of skink found in Vietnam, Thailand, and Laos.
