= Hat Pak =

Commune in Veun Sai District, Ratanakiri Province, Cambodia

Hat Pak ហាត់ប៉ក់
- Commune
- Location within Cambodia
- Coordinates: 13.85°N 106.7°E
- Country: Cambodia
- Province: Ratanakiri Province
- District: Veun Sai
- Villages: 3

Population (1998)
  - Total: 978
- Time zone: UTC+07
- Geocode: 160903

Hat Pak (Khmer: ហាត់ប៉ក់) is a commune in Veun Sai District in northeast Cambodia. It contains three villages and has a population of 978. In the 2007 commune council elections, four seats went to members of the Cambodian People's Party and one seat went to a member of Funcinpec.

== Villages ==
Village	Population (1998)	Sex ratio (male/female) (1998)	Number of households (1998)
Hat Pak	661	0.96	108
Veun Hay	238	0.93	41
Pak Laav	79	0.93	15
