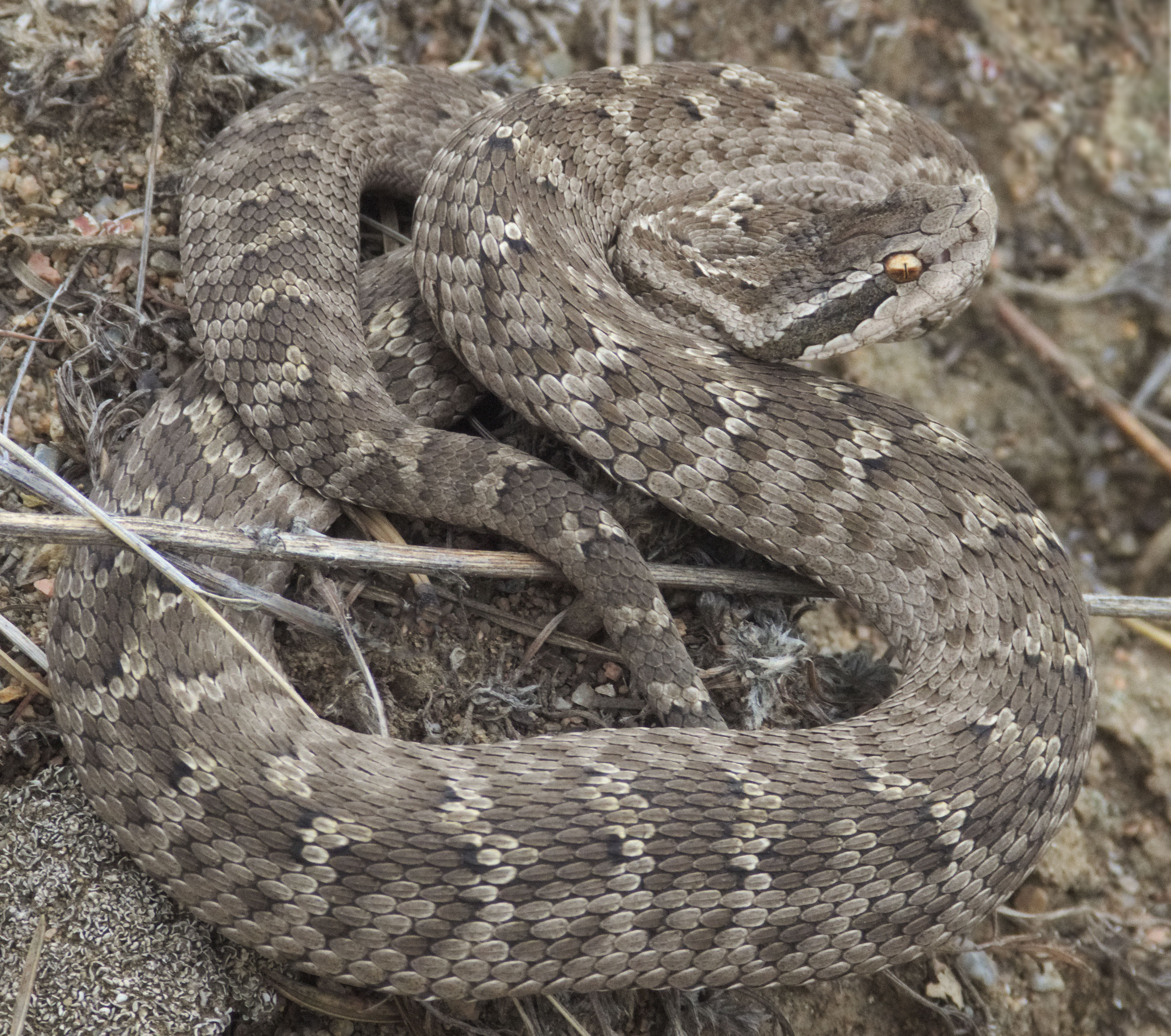
- On the Great Baikal Trail

Conservation status
- Least Concern (IUCN 3.1)

Scientific classification
- Kingdom: Animalia
- Phylum: Chordata
- Class: Reptilia
- Order: Squamata
- Suborder: Serpentes
- Family: Viperidae
- Genus: Gloydius
- Species: G. halys

Binomial name
- Gloydius halys (Pallas, 1776)

Synonyms
- List: Coluber halys Pallas, 1776; [Vipera (Echidna) Aspis] Pallasii Merrem, 1820; Trigonocephalus Halys — Lichtenstein In Eversmann & Lichtenstein, 1823; Vipera Halys — Lichtenstein In Eversmann & Lichtenstein, 1823; Trigonocephalus halys — F. Boie, 1827; Trigonocephalus [(Halys)] Halys — Gray, 1849; Halys pallasii — Günther, 1864; Ancistrodon halys — Boulenger, 1896; A[gkistrodon]. halys — Stejneger, 1907; Ancistrodon halys halys — Nikolsky, 1916; Agkistrodon halys halys — Mertens & L. Müller, 1928; Gloydius halys halys — Hoge & Romano-Hoge, 1981

= Gloydius halys =

Species of snake

Common names: Siberian pit viper, Halys viper, Halys pit viper, more.

Gloydius halys is a pit viper species found within a wide range that stretches across Asia, from Russia, east of the Urals, eastwards through China. Four subspecies are currently recognized, including the nominotypical form described here.

== Description ==
Gloydius halys grows to a maximum total length of 59 cm (23 in), which was for a female, with an included tail length of 68 mm (2.7 in). The largest male on record measured 53 cm (21 in) in total length, which included a tail length of 80 mm (3.1 in). The body build is described as moderately stout with a snout that is slightly upturned when viewed from the side.

Dorsally, G. halys is grayish, pale brown, reddish, or yellowish, with large dark spots or crossbars, the borders of which are serrated. One or two lateral series of smaller dark spots are present. There is a wide dark stripe behind the eye, bordered by light stripes both above and below. The venter is whitish, speckled with gray or brown.

The strongly keeled dorsal scales are arranged in 23 rows at midbody. The ventrals number 149-174. The anal plate is entire. The subcaudals number 31-44, and are divided (paired).

== Common names ==
Common names for G. halys include Siberian pit viper, Halys viper, Halys pit viper, Pallas's pit viper, Asiatic pit viper, Asiatic moccasin, shchitomordnik, Pallas's viper, Pallas pit viper, Korean pit viper, Mongolian pit viper.

== Geographic range ==
Gloydius halys is found in Russia, east of the Ural Mountains through Siberia, Iran, Mongolia to northern and central China, as well as the southern Ryukyu Islands of Japan. According to Gloyd and Conant (1990), the type locality given is "Salt Lake near the Lugaskoi Sawod (factory) on the Upper Yenisey" (Siberia, Russia). Redefined by Bour (1993) as "Naryn or Ryn Peski desert, near the Russia-Kazakhstan border".

== Subspecies ==
Subspecies	Taxon author	Common name	Geographic range
G. h. boehmei	Nilson, 1983	Boehme's pitviper	Known only from the type locality: Andarab valley, province of Baghlan, at 2,500 m altitude, eastern Afghanistan.
G. h. halys	(Pallas, 1776)	Siberian pitviper	Southern Siberia and Mongolia, from the Zeya River west to longitude 74° E.
G. h. mogoi	Bour, 1993		Western Mongolia.
G. h. ubsunurensis	Kropachev & Orlov, 2017		West and South Mongolia and Tuva Republic, Russia.

== Etymology ==
The subspecific name, boehmei, is in honor of German herpetologist Wolfgang Böhme.
