= Gloydius halys ubsunurensis =

Scientific classification
- Kingdom: Animalia
- Phylum: Chordata
- Class: Reptilia
- Order: Squamata
- Suborder: Serpentes
- Family: Viperidae
- Genus: Gloydius
- Species: G. halys
- Subspecies: G. h. ubsunurensis

Trinomial name
- Gloydius halys ubsunurensis Kropachev & Orlov, 2017

Subspecies of Eurasian snake

Gloydius halys ubsunurensis, also known as the Ubsunur pit viper or the Ubsunur Mamushi, is a subspecies of Halys pitviper from Mongolia and Russia. As with all pit vipers, it is venomous.

== Description ==
Gloydius halys ubsunurensis is distinguished from its sister subspecies by specific scale counts as well as the many light bands across its body and tail outlined in a darker colouration, its light-brown to grey colouration and its darker underside.

== Reproduction ==
Glydius halys ubsunurensis is known to be viviparous.
