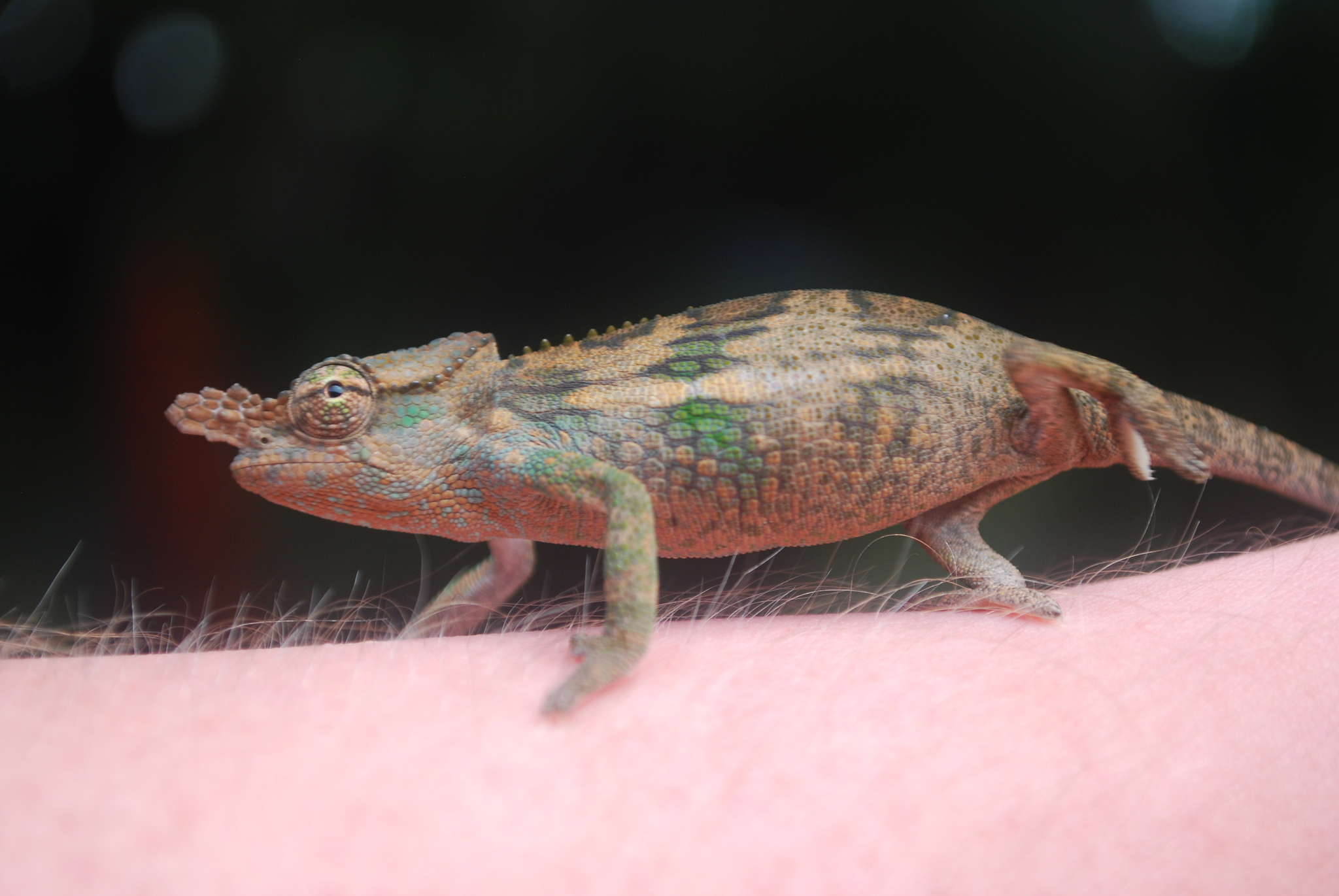

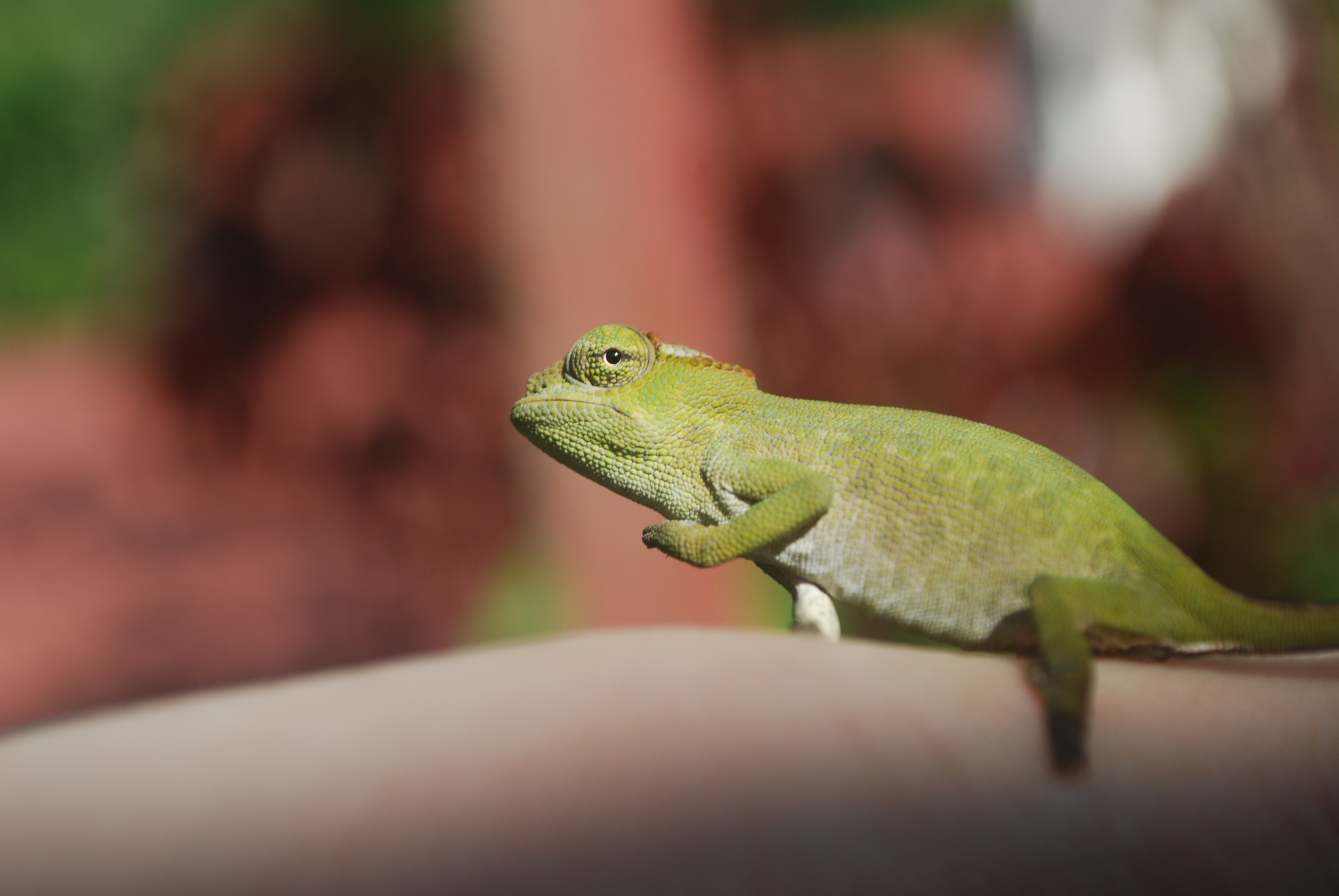
- Male above, female below

Conservation status
- Near Threatened (IUCN 3.1)

Scientific classification
- Kingdom: Animalia
- Phylum: Chordata
- Class: Reptilia
- Order: Squamata
- Suborder: Iguania
- Family: Chamaeleonidae
- Genus: Kinyongia
- Species: K. boehmei

Binomial name
- Kinyongia boehmei (Lutzmann & Nečas, 2002)
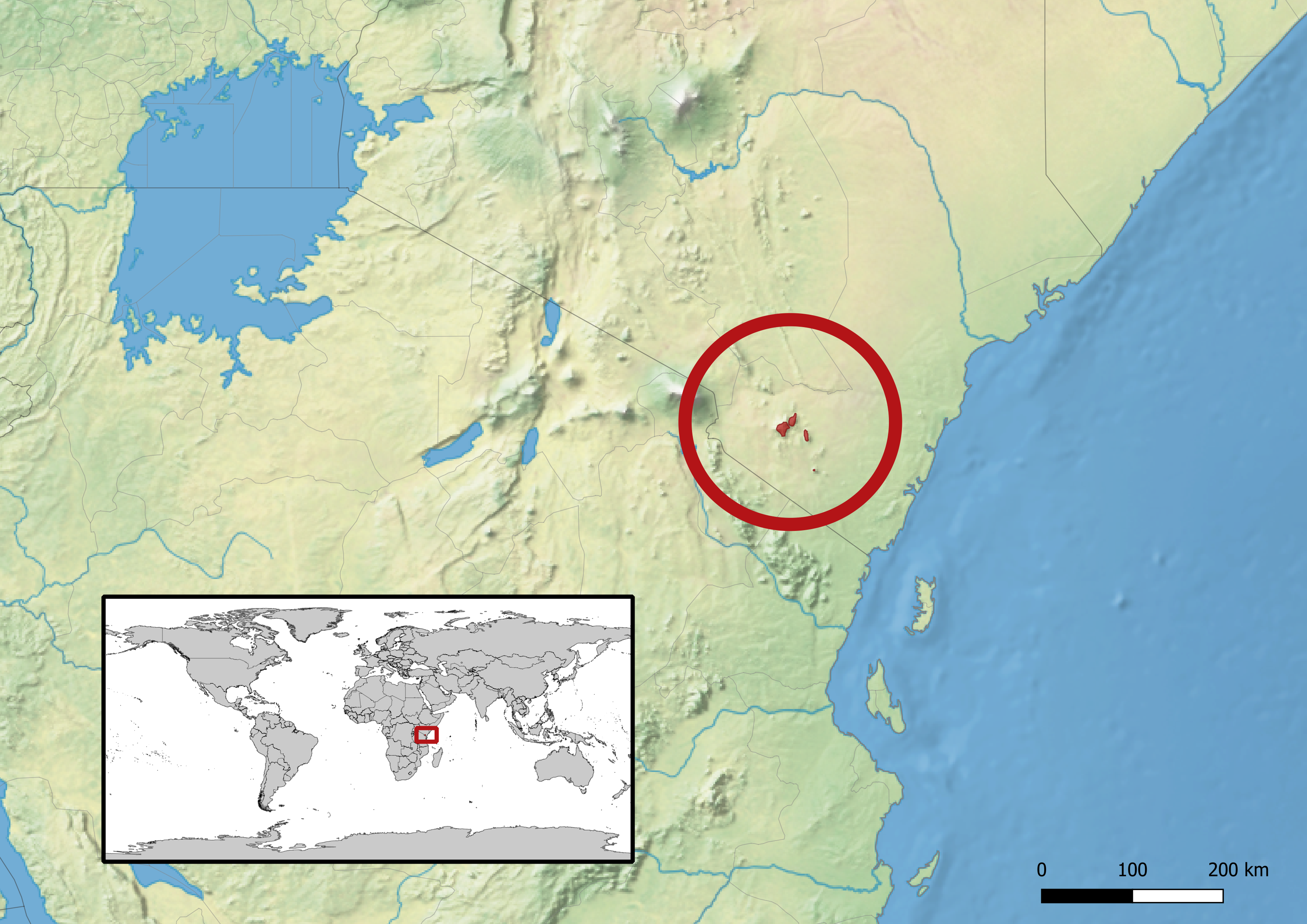

Synonyms
- Bradypodion tavetanum boehmei Lutzmann & Nečas, 2002; Kinyongia tavetana boehmei — Tilbury et al., 2006; Kinyongia boehmei — Mariaux et al., 2008

= Kinyongia boehmei =

Species of lizard

Kinyongia boehmei, the Taita blade-horned chameleon, Böhme's two-horned chameleon and Dwarf fischer's chameleon, is species of chameleon, a lizard in the family Chamaeleonidae, found only in the Taita Hills of southeastern Kenya. It is the smallest species in the East African "two-horned chameleon" group and until 2008 it was generally considered a part of K. tavetana.

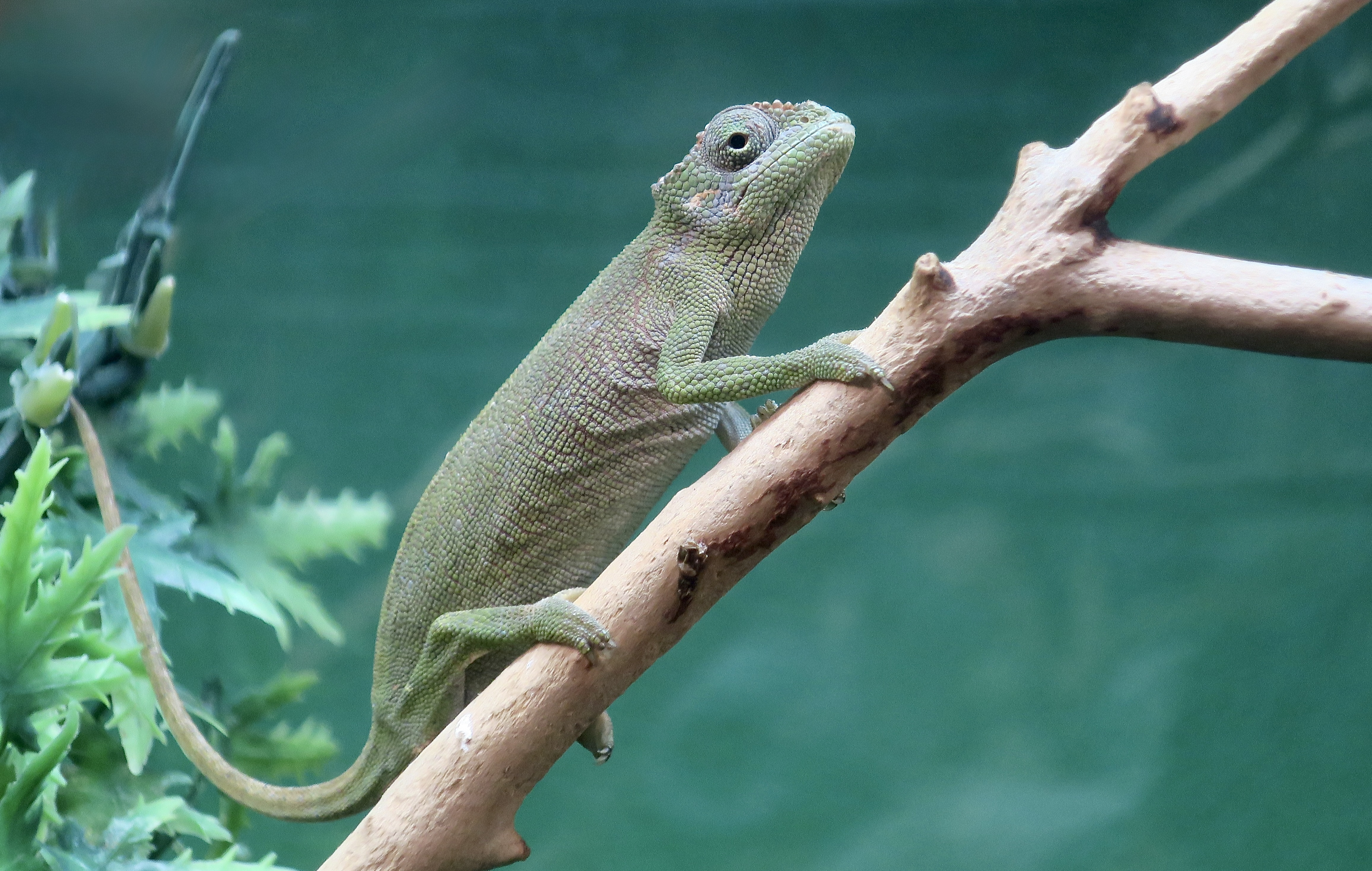
A female at LLL Reptiles, a reptile store in Las Vegas.

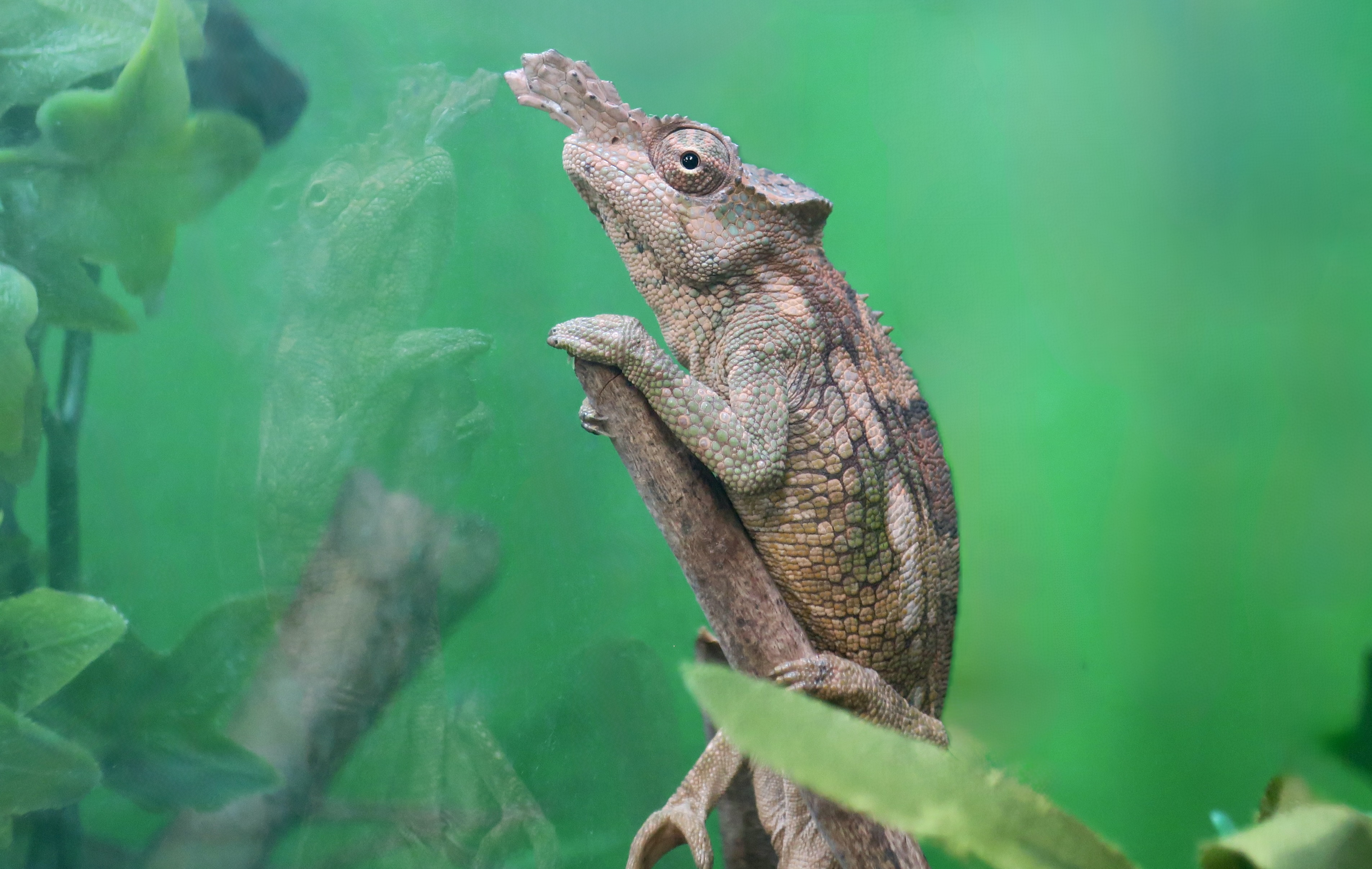
A male at LLL Reptiles, a reptile store in Henderson, Nevada.

== Taxonomy and etymology ==
Kinyongia boehmei was first scientifically described in 2002, originally as a subspecies of K. tavetana. In 2008, the taxonomy of the "two-horned chameleons" in Kenya and Tanzania was reviewed, which prior to the study only consisted of two recognized species, K. fischeri and K. tavetana. It was shown that boehmei is sufficiently distinct from K. tavetana to be recognized as a separate species, although the two are sister species.

The specific name, boehmei, is in honor of German herpetologist Wolfgang Böhme.

== Geographic range and habitat ==
K. boehmei is found only in the Taita Hills of southeastern Kenya, at altitudes of 1,000 to 2,200 m (3,300–7,200 ft). It occurs in the canopy of forests, as well as in patches of trees and bushes in subsistence farms.

== Appearance ==
K. boehmei is the smallest of the "two-horned chameleon" group of Kenya and Tanzania. It is up to 18.6 cm (7.3 in) in total length, with the tail making up more than half of that. Females do not grow as large as males. Adult males have a pair of large, mostly parallel, flattened "horns" on the nose, whereas females essentially are hornless. The flattened shape of the male's "horns" separates it from male K. tavetana where they have a triangular shape. Both sexes of K. boehmei have several small elevated tubercles on the section of the ridge of the back (dorsal crest) nearest to the head, which are lacking in K. tavetana.

== Reproduction ==
K. boehmei is oviparous. There are typically 2–11 eggs in a clutch.
