= Lygosoma boehmei =

Conservation status
- Data Deficient (IUCN 3.1)

Scientific classification
- Kingdom: Animalia
- Phylum: Chordata
- Class: Reptilia
- Order: Squamata
- Family: Scincidae
- Genus: Lygosoma
- Species: L. boehmei

Binomial name
- Lygosoma boehmei Ziegler, Schmitz, Heidrich, Vu & T.Q. Nguyen, 2007

Synonyms
- Lygosoma boehmei Ziegler et al., 2007; Riopa boehmei — Bobrov & Semenov, 2008; Lygosoma boehmei — Geissler, Hartmann & Neang, 2012

Species of lizard

Lygosoma boehmei is a species of skink, a lizard in the family Scincidae. The species is endemic to Vietnam.

== Etymology ==
The specific name, boehmei, is in honor of German herpetologist Wolfgang Böhme.

== Discovery ==
L. boehmei was discovered in Ke Bang National Park, central Quang Binh Province, Vietnam.

== Habitat ==
The preferred natural habitat of L. boehmei is forest, at an altitude of approximately 375 m (1,230 ft).

== Description ==
Dorsally, L. boehmei is reddish brown on the body, and brownish black on the limbs and tail. Ventrally, it is light orange on the chin and throat, cream to light brownish on the body, and grayish on the tail. The holotype has a snout-to-vent length (SVL) of 8.6 cm (3.4 in).

== Behavior ==
L. boehmei is terrestrial and nocturnal.

== Diet ==
The stomach of the holotype contained the remains of an earthworm.

== Reproduction ==
The mode of reproduction of L. boehmei is unknown.
