= Ban Pong (commune) =

Ban Pong បានប៉ុង
- Commune
- Location within Cambodia
- Coordinates: 13.9667°N 106.8333°E
- Country: Cambodia
- Province: Ratanakiri Province
- District: Veun Sai
- Villages: 2

Population (1998)
  - Total: 1,795
- Time zone: UTC+07
- Geocode: 160901

Ban Pong (Khmer: បានប៉ុង) is a commune in Veun Sai District in northeast Cambodia. It contains two villages and has a population of 1795. In the 2007 commune council elections, all five seats went to members of the Cambodian People's Party. Land alienation is a problem of moderate severity in Ban Pong. (See Ratanakiri Province for background information on land alienation.)

== Villages ==
Village	Population (1998)	Sex ratio (male/female) (1998)	Number of households (1998)	Notes
Ban Pong (also Pong)	805	0.93	133	
Baan Fang (also Ban Hvang)	990	0.94	171	
