= Wolfgang Böhme (zoologist) =

German herpetologist

- Born: November 21, 1944; Kiel, Germany
- Education: University of Kiel
- Known for: Taxonomy and systematics of monitor lizards (Varanus)
- Scientific career
- Fields: Herpetology
- Workplaces: Zoological Research Museum Alexander Koenig
- Doctoral advisor: Wolf Herre

Wolfgang Böhme (born 21 November 1944 in Kiel) is a German herpetologist.

== Life and education ==
Böhme grew up in Kiel. As a child, he kept lizards he had caught himself and preserved them after their death. He attended the Kieler Gelehrtenschule, a humanistic secondary school in his hometown, which he completed with the Abitur.

In 1965, Böhme began studying zoology, botany, and paleontology at the University of Kiel. In 1971, he received his doctorate under Wolf Herre with a dissertation on the morphology of the hemipenis in true lizards (Lacertidae) and its significance for their systematics.

== Career ==
Shortly after completing his doctorate, Böhme became head of the Herpetology Section at the Zoological Research Museum Alexander Koenig in Bonn. In 1989, he was appointed Head of the Vertebrates Department, and in 1992 he became Deputy Director of the museum.

Böhme retired in 2010, after the Ministry of Science had previously granted him an additional year in office. His successor was Dennis Rödder.

From the winter semester of 1980–81 onward, Böhme was involved in teaching and supervising students at the University of Bonn. He completed his habilitation in 1988 and was awarded the venia legendi. In April 1996, he was appointed adjunct professor (außerplanmäßiger Professor) at the University of Bonn. He supervised numerous master's and doctoral theses.

In addition, Böhme is a member of the German Society for Herpetology and Herpetoculture (DGHT). He served as its chairman from 1983 to 1991. In September 1979, he was a co-founder of the Societas Europaea Herpetologica, which publishes the journal Amphibia-Reptilia. In 1993, he was elected president of the society in Barcelona and was re-elected for another four-year term in 1997 in Prague.

== Scientific work ==
At the Museum Koenig, Böhme established a herpetological research group focusing on various aspects of reptile biology in the western Palearctic, West and Central Africa, Bolivia, Peru, Vietnam, and Indonesia. Under his leadership, the museum's herpetological collection grew from fewer than 9,600 specimens to approximately 90,000 specimens.

Böhme is best known for his primarily taxonomic work on monitor lizards (genus Varanus). He is the original describer of twelve species, two subspecies, and one subgenus. Together with Thomas Ziegler (1997), he revised the internal systematics of the genus Varanus based on hemipenial morphology. Many of the new species he described were based on museum specimens and individuals from the pet trade.

Although many of the species described by Böhme originate from Indonesia, he has never visited the country. In contrast, he undertook six expeditions lasting one to three months to West and Central Africa: to Cameroon in spring 1973 and winter 1973–74; to the Senegal–Gambia region in winter 1975–76; to Guinea in 1993; again to Cameroon in 1998; and in 1999, during a trans-Sahara expedition in both directions, to Morocco, Western Sahara, Mauritania, and Senegal.

Böhme discovered the Yemen monitor (Varanus yemenensis) in the 1980s through a television documentary. He is also the editor of the standard reference work Handbook of the Amphibians and Reptiles of Europe.

Axel Kwet described Wolfgang Böhme as the "most prominent hub of the German herpetological community" and an "important link between amateurs and professionals". He is regarded as a key figure within the German Society for Herpetology and Herpetoculture (DGHT), and many of his former students are now well-known herpetologists.

== Taxa named in his honor ==
Due to Böhme's central role in herpetological research, numerous newly discovered species have been named after him. The Reptile Database lists twelve valid species bearing the epithet boehmei, including Varanus boehmei, Tropiocolotes wolfgangboehmei, Tropidophorus boehmei, Trapelus boehmei, Tarentola boehmei, Pseudoboodon boehmei, Pachydactylus boehmei, Lygosoma boehmei, Kinyongia boehmei, Cerastes boehmei, and Alsophylax boehmei.

In addition, three valid subspecies are named after him, within Darevskia derjugini, Gloydius halys, and Phelsuma madagascariensis.

== Selected works ==
As of 2013, Wolfgang Böhme had published more than 625 scientific papers and continues to publish.

- Böhme, W. (1971). Über das Stachelepithel am Hemipenis lacertider Eidechsen und seine systematische Bedeutung. Zeitschrift für zoologische Systematik und Evolutionsforschung, 9, 187–223.
- Böhme, W. (ed.) (2014). Herpetology in Bonn. Mertensiella 21. German Society for Herpetology and Herpetoculture.
