= Lygosoma veunsaiense =

Conservation status
- Least Concern (IUCN 3.1)

Scientific classification
- Kingdom: Animalia
- Phylum: Chordata
- Class: Reptilia
- Order: Squamata
- Family: Scincidae
- Genus: Lygosoma
- Species: L. veunsaiense

Binomial name
- Lygosoma veunsaiense Geissler, Hartmann, and Neang, 2012

Species of lizard

Lygosoma veunsaiense is a species of skink that is endemic to northeastern Cambodia. Its description as a new species was published in 2012, receiving both local and international publicity.

== Discovery ==
In 2010, at the remote rainforest area of Veun Sai-Siem Pang National Park in Ratanakiri Province, Cambodia a Fauna and Flora International herpetologist, Thy Neang, first discovered Lygosoma veunsaiense. Peter Geissler from Museum Koenig in Germany, was one of the authors who described the skink.

== Description ==
This type of lizard has iridescent rainbow skin with a long tail and short legs. The outer ear opening is absent; supranasals distinct and separated from each other by frontonasal; supranasals not fused with nasals; midbody scales in 22 rows; fontoparietals paired; five supralabial scales; a light stripe present on outer edge of the dorsum; and a dark dorsolateral stripe present, from behind the eye to the tail.

== Habitat ==
Lygosoma veunsaiense spends most of its life underground in the rainforest.
