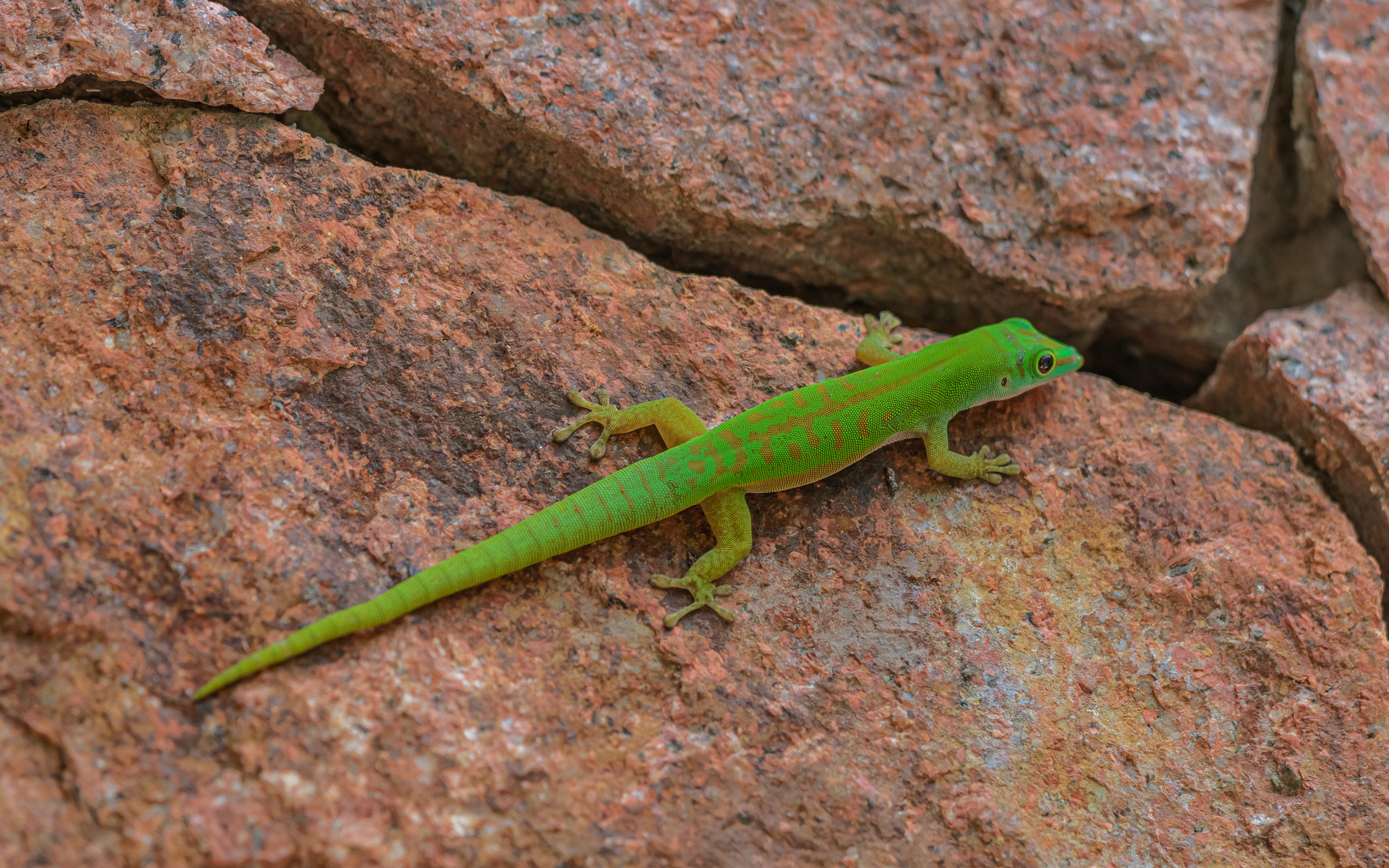

Scientific classification
- Kingdom: Animalia
- Phylum: Chordata
- Class: Reptilia
- Order: Squamata
- Suborder: Gekkota
- Family: Gekkonidae
- Genus: Phelsuma
- Species: P. astriata
- Subspecies: P. a. astriata

Trinomial name
- Phelsuma astriata astriata Tornier, 1901

Synonyms
- Phelsuma lineata astriata Tornier, 1901; Phelsuma carinatum Rendahl, 1939; Phelsuma carinatum maheense Rendahl, 1939

= Phelsuma astriata astriata =

Subspecies of lizard

Phelsuma astriata astriata is a subspecies of Seychelles small day gecko. It is a small, slender lizard with bright green colour that feeds primarily on insects. It is found on several islands of the Seychelles.

== Description ==
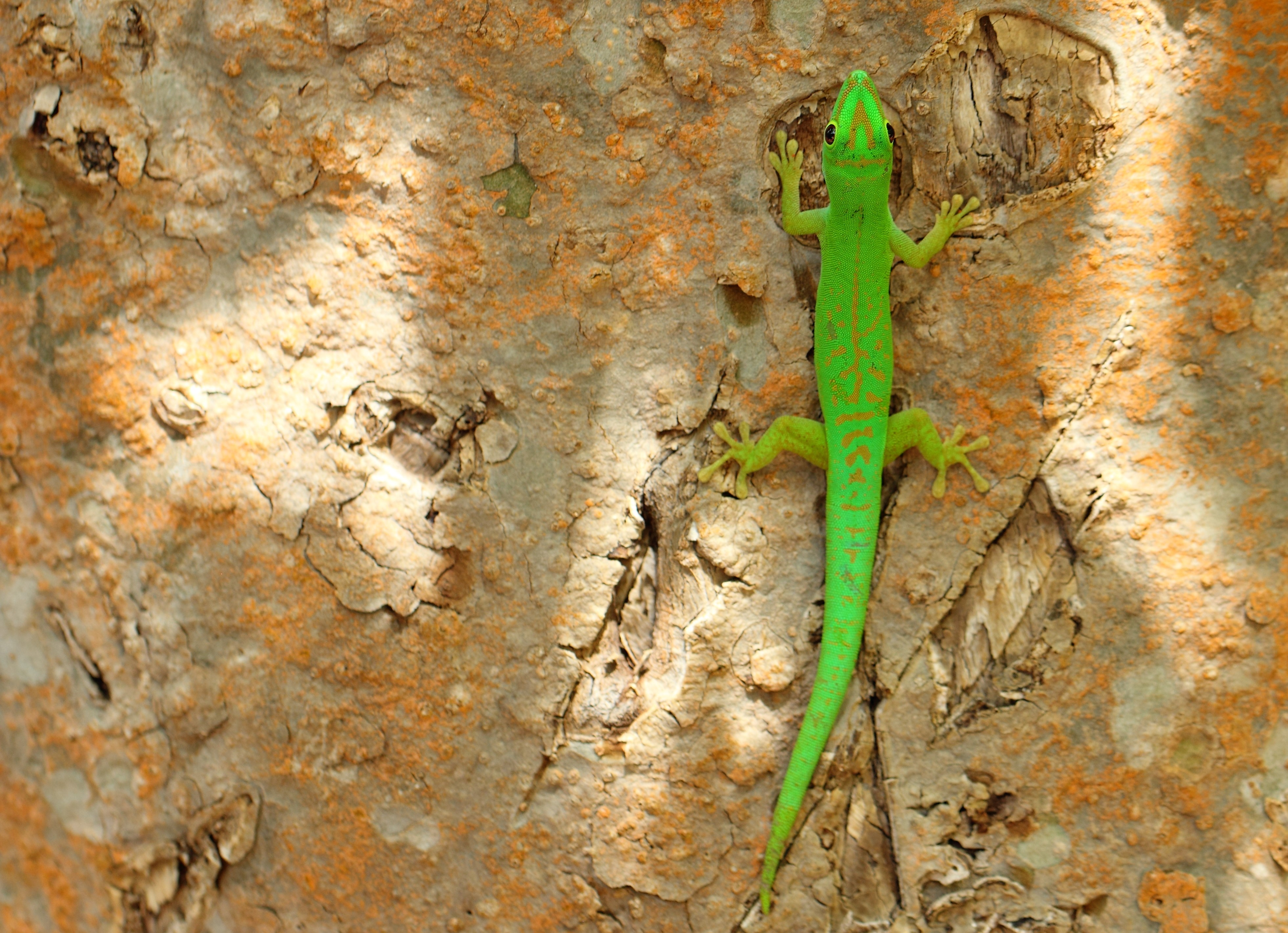
Seychelles small day gecko (Phelsuma astriata astriata) on Cousin Island

Its body is lime green with coloured dots and bars on the back. Those reddish dots sometimes form a mid-dorsal stripe, which can be very faint. Males often have a bluish or turquoise-coloured tail and lower back. On both sides of the snout, a reddish-brown stripe extends from the nostrils to the eyes. The undersurface of the body is off-white. These lizards reach a total length of about 14 cm.

== Distribution ==
This gecko is found on the Seychelles islands of Astove, Mahé, Praslin, Curieuse, La Digue, and Frégate.

== Habitat ==
This species is typically found on coconut palms and banana trees. It often lives near human settlements.

== Reproduction ==
Phelsuma astriata astriata normally lays two 10 mm eggs. Seychelles small day geckos are not gluers; they do not stick their eggs to the sides/underside of items, but instead place them in safe, well-hidden areas. Incubation is generally 65 – 70 days at 82 degrees Fahrenheit.

== Bibliography ==
- Henkel, F. W. and Schmidt, W. (1995) Amphibien und Reptilien Madagaskars, der Maskarenen, Seychellen und Komoren. Ulmer Stuttgart. ISBN 3-8001-7323-9
- McKeown, Sean (1993) Day Geckos (General Care, Maintenance and Breeding Series). Advanced Vivarium Systems, Lakeside CA. ISBN 1-882770-22-6
- Species Phelsuma astriata at The Reptile Database
