= Chanang =

Cambodian soup

- Type: Soup
- Place of origin: Cambodia
- Region or state: Ratanakiri province
- Serving temperature: Hot

Chanang (Khmer: ចាណាង) is a Cambodian soup eaten by Kreung and other ethnic groups in Ratanakiri province. It is made with beef or pork, noodles, Senna occidentalis, bamboo shoots, baby corn, taro leaves, and ghost beans, the latter of which gives the soup its characteristic dark colour.
