= Khmer Lao people =

Ethnic Laotians living in Cambodia

Khmer Lao people ជនជាតិខ្មែរឡាវ
Total population
- ,≈ 23,400

Regions with significant populations
- Preah Vihear, Stung Treng, Ratanakiri，Banteay Meanchey

Languages
- Khmer, Lao

Related ethnic groups
- Lao

Khmer Lao people (Khmer: ខ្មែរឡាវ) or Lao Daeum (Khmer: ឡាវដើម, lit. 'Indigenous Lao people') are ethnic Lao living in northeastern Cambodia and western Cambodia . They are estimated to be 23,400 Khmer Lao native to the northeastern provinces of Cambodia.

== Distribution ==
Khmer Lao people are native to the Preah Vihear, Ratanakiri and Stung Treng provinces with small communities existing in Mongkol Borey Banteay Meanchey province. They form the dominant ethnicity in Stung Treng, where a consulate of Laos was established and is still being operated. Most Khmer Lao people live in Sesan, Siem Pang and Siem Bok districts in Stung Treng province. In Ratanakiri province, many ethnic Laotians live in Vensai and Lumphat districts. The Khmer Lao population is hard to estimate as they are not considered indigenous minorities by the Cambodian government and have to either register as Khmer or Laotian citizen during censuses. It is suggested that over half of Stung Treng's population may be ethnic Lao, with a smaller population in Ratanakiri Province.

== History ==
Northeastern Cambodia was originally inhabited and controlled by Khmer people but ethnic Lao began to migrate to southern Laos and northeastern Cambodia around the fourteenth century, taking advantage of the power decline in Angkor. In 1353 king Fa Ngum extended Lao influence to the Khone Falls now situated at the border of Laos and Cambodia. Lao migration increased in the sixteenth and seventeenth centuries, leading in 1713 to the establishment of the independent Champasak Kingdom in areas now belonging to southern Laos and northeastern Cambodia. The kingdom became a Siamese vassal state in 1778. In the late 1880s, under Siam, Champassak devised a plan to secure territories amid French colonial ambitions. They succeeded in establishing what is known now as Veun Sai village in Cambodia and gained considerable influence in the Sesan Bassin. Stung Treng city (Xiang Teng in Lao) was founded by a Laotian monk named Seang Peng from Vientiane. The Lao name Xiang Teng later gave the Khmer "Stung Treng". The Lao were not able to prevent the French from gaining control of the Sesan River Basin in 1893, including its most important center, the city of Stung Treng, located where the Sekong River, which the Sesan River flows into, enters the Mekong River. Lao people however succeeded in maintaining considerable influence in the region when it was part of French Laos. Despite the large Lao population, the French later transferred the northeastern-most part of Cambodia from Laos to Cambodia in 1904 following demands by the government of Cambodia motivated by historical claims. Even after Cambodia's independence, Lao influence in Stung Treng and Ratanakiri Provinces remained strong despite Khmerization efforts, including language restrictions imposed by the Sangkum Reastr Niyum government in the 1960s.

== Culture ==
The Khmer Lao speak variants of Lao that differ from each other and from the Lao spoken in Laos. A particular dialect called Lao Kha is a creole language mixing vocabulary from Lao and various highland minorities languages. The Khmer Lao traditionally live along the other minorities of northern Cambodia, notably the Brao, the Kavet and the Phnong. Khmer Lao traditions include various ceremonies. The wedding ceremony differs from the Khmer one as the Khmer Lao people do not parade during the wedding. It is also forbidden for the groom to climb and cut trees before the wedding. Khmer Lao people free their buffalo in the forest once the rice harvest is done, they will catch them again only for next year harvest. Their traditions are in danger and many fear they might disappear following growing Khmer influence. As an increasing number of Khmer people settle in Khmer Lao village and Khmer being mandatory in schools, the use of Lao is in decline.

== Notable people ==
- Sinn Sisamouth — Half Khmer Lao singer and songwriter active from the 1950s to the 1970s. He is widely considered the "King of Khmer Music"
- Ken Lo - actor
