= Kavet people =

Ethnic group in Cambodia

Kavet
Regions with significant populations
- Cambodia: 6,218 (2008 census)

Languages
- Kavet, Khmer

Related ethnic groups
- Brao, Kreung, Lun

The Kavet (Kravet, Kaveat, Khmer: កាវេត or កាវ៉ែត}}) are an ethnic group that live in Cambodia, mainly in Stung Treng (Siem Pang District) and Ratanakiri Province (Veun Sai District). They speak Kavet language. There are 6,218 Kavet people in Cambodia as of 2008.

== See also ==
- Khmer Loeu
