= Khmer Loeu =

Indigenous peoples of the highlands of Cambodia

ជនជាតិខ្មែរលើ

Total population
- 179,193 (2008 census); 142,700 (1996 est.) Significant groups: Bunong 37,507 (2008); Tampuan 31,013 (2008); Kuy 28,612 (2008); Jarai 26,335 (2008); Kreung 19,988 (2008); Brao 9,025 (2008); Stieng 6,541 (2008); Kavet 6,218 (2008); Kraol 4,202 (2008); Pear 1,827 (2008)

Regions with significant populations
- Cambodia

Languages
- Khmer, other Austroasiatic languages

Religion
- Theravada Buddhism, Animism

Ethnic map of Cambodia (1972).

The Khmer Loeu (Khmer: ជនជាតិខ្មែរលើ [cunciət kʰmae ləː]; "upper Khmers") is the collective name given to the various indigenous ethnic groups residing in the highlands of Cambodia. The Khmer Loeu are found mainly in the northeastern provinces of Ratanakiri, Stung Treng, and Mondulkiri. Most of the highland groups are Mon-Khmer peoples and are distantly related, to one degree or another, to the Khmer. Two of the Khmer Loeu groups are Chamic peoples, a branch of the Austronesian peoples, and have a very different linguistic and cultural background. The Mon–Khmer-speaking tribes are the aboriginal inhabitants of mainland Southeast Asia, their ancestors having trickled into the area from the northwest during the prehistoric metal ages. The Austronesian-speaking groups, Rade and Jarai, are descendants of the Malayo-Polynesian peoples who came to what is now coastal Vietnam; they established the Champa kingdoms, and after their decline migrated west over the Annamite Range, dispersing between the Mon–Khmer groups.

The disparate groups that make up the Khmer Loeu are estimated to comprise 17-21 different ethnic groups speaking at least 17 different languages. Unlike the Cham, Vietnamese and Chinese minorities of the lowlands, the Khmer Loeu groups have not integrated into Khmer society or culture and remain politically unorganized and underrepresented in the Cambodian government. There have never been any treaties between a Khmer Loeu group and the government nor is Cambodia a signatory to the Indigenous and Tribal Peoples Convention. Cambodia's landmark 2001 land law guarantees indigenous peoples communal rights to their traditional lands, but the government is accused of routinely violating those provisions, confiscating land for purposes ranging from commercial logging to foreign development.

== Terminology ==
Traditionally, the ruling Khmer majority has referred to all the highland groups as phnong, a name of one of the groups that has come to mean "savage" in Khmer, or samre, the name of another group that has developed the meaning "bumpkin" or "hick". Both of these words are now considered pejorative. The colonial French administration designated the highland ethnicities of Cambodia, Laos and Vietnam "Montagnards".

The term "Khmer Loeu" was crafted by the Sangkum Reastr Niyum government of Sihanouk's Cambodia in the 1950s. To stress the unity, or "Cambodian-ness", of the various ethnic groups that inhabited its borders and promote a nationalist cohesiveness, the government classified citizens as one of three groups of "Khmer", Khmer Kandal, Khmer Islam and Khmer Loeu. Khmer Kandal ("Central Khmer") referred to the ethnic Khmer majority. Khmer Islam was the name given to the ethnic Cham inhabiting the central plains of Cambodia. Khmer Loeu was coined as a catch-all term to include all of the indigenous minority ethnic groups, most of which reside in the remote highlands of northeast Cambodia. The current government has used the term Choncheate Daeum Pheak Tech (ជនជាតិដើមភាគតិច; "Original Ethnic Minority") in official documents while referring to ethnic Khmer as Choncheate Daeum Pheak Chraeun (ជនជាតិដើមភាគច្រើន; "Original Ethnic Majority"). However "Khmer Loeu" still remains the colloquial and most common designation for these groups.

In the Khmer language, an alternative, though unrelated, use of the term "Khmer Loeu" is in reference to the Northern Khmer people. Ethnic Khmers sometimes use a tripartite division to differentiate Khmers native to Thailand, Cambodia or Vietnam. Those native to Thailand are sometimes referred to as "Khmer Loeu" due to their location on the southern Khorat Plateau relative to those native to Cambodia, "Khmer Kandal", while Khmer native to the lower Mekong Delta region of Vietnam are called "Khmer Krom" ("lower Khmer" or "southern Khmer").

== Geography and demographics ==
Khmer Loeu form the majority population in Ratanakiri and Mondulkiri provinces, and they also are present in substantial numbers in Kratié Province and Stung Treng Province. Their total population in 1969 was estimated at 90,000 people. In 1971 the number of Khmer Loeu was estimated variously between 40,000 and 100,000 people. Population figures were unavailable in 1987, but the total probably was nearly 100,000 people. According to the General Population Census conducted in 2008, their total population was 179,193.

Population
Ethnic group	2008
Total	179,193
Bunong	37,507
Tampuan	31,013
Kuy	28,612
Jarai	26,335
Kreung	19,988
Brao	9,025
Stieng	6,541
Kavet	6,218
Kraol	4,202
Pear	1,827
Ro Ong	1,831
Mel	1,697
Thmoon	865
Suoy	857
Khogn	743
Klueng	702
Kchruk	408
Sa'och	445
Ta Mun	400
Lon	327
K'nuh	56
Mon	19
Rade	21
Kchak	10
K'jah	5

== Culture ==
Most Khmer Loeu live in scattered temporary villages that have only a few hundred inhabitants. These villages usually are governed by a council of local elders or by a village headman.

The Khmer Loeu cultivate a wide variety of plants, but the main crop is dry or upland rice grown by the slash-and-burn method. Hunting, fishing, and gathering supplement the cultivated vegetable foods in the Khmer Loeu diet. Houses vary from huge multifamily longhouses to small single-family structures. They may be built close to the ground or on stilts.

== History ==
During the period of the French Protectorate, the French did not interfere in the affairs of the Khmer Loeu. Reportedly, French army commanders considered the Khmer Loeu as an excellent source of personnel for army outposts, and they recruited large numbers to serve with the French forces. Many Khmer Loeu continued this tradition by enlisting in the Cambodian army.

In the 1960s, the Cambodian government carried out a broad civic action program—for which the army had responsibility—among the Khmer Loeu in Mondulkiri, Ratanakiri, Stung Treng, and Koh Kong provinces. The goals of this program were to educate the Khmer Loeu, to teach them Khmer, and eventually to assimilate them into the mainstream of Cambodian society. There was some effort at resettlement; in other cases, civil servants went out to live with individual Khmer Loeu groups to teach their members Khmer ways. Schools were provided for some Khmer Loeu communities, and in each large village a resident government representative disseminated information and encouraged the Khmer Loeu to learn the lowland Khmer way of life. Civil servants sent to work among the Khmer Loeu often viewed the assignment as a kind of punishment.

In the late 1960s, an estimated 5,000 Khmer Loeu in eastern Cambodia rose in rebellion against the government and demanded self-determination and independence. The government press reported that local leaders loyal to the government had been assassinated. Following the rebellion, the hill people's widespread resentment of ethnic Khmer settlers caused them to refuse to cooperate with the Cambodian army in its suppression of rural unrest. Both the Khmer Rouge and the Vietnamese communists took advantage of this disaffection, and they actively recruited Khmer Loeu into their ranks. In 1968, Pol Pot and other Khmer Rouge fled to Khmer Loeu lands, who were seen as hostile to lowland Khmer and to the government. In late 1970, the government forces withdrew from Ratanakiri and Mondulkiri provinces and abandoned the area to the rapidly growing Khmer Rouge communist insurgent force, the Revolutionary Army of Kampuchea, and to its Vietnamese mentors. There is some evidence that in the 1960s and in the 1970s the Front Uni pour la Libération des Races Opprimés (FULRO—United Front for the Liberation of Oppressed Races) united tribes in the mountainous areas of southern Vietnam and had members from Khmer Loeu groups as well as from the Cham in Cambodia.

In the early 1980s, Khmer Rouge propaganda teams infiltrated the northeastern provinces and encouraged rebellion against the central government. In 1981 the government structure included four Khmer Loeu province chiefs, all reportedly from the Brao group, in the northeastern provinces of Mondulkiri, Ratanakiri, Stung Treng, and Preah Vihear. According to a 1984 resolution of the PRK National Cadres Conference entitled "Policy Toward Ethnic Minorities," the minorities were considered an integral part of the Cambodian nation, and they were to be encouraged to participate in collectivization. Government policy aimed to transform minority groups into modern Cambodians. The same resolution called for the elimination of illiteracy, with the stipulations that minority languages be respected and that each tribe be allowed to write, speak, and teach in its own language.

== Groups ==
The major Khmer Loeu groups in Cambodia are the Kuy, Pnong, Stieng, Brao, Tampuan, Pear, Jarai, and Rade. All but the last two speak Mon–Khmer languages.

=== Kuy ===
In the late 1980s, about 160,000 Kuy lived in the northern Cambodian provinces of Kampong Thom, Preah Vihear, and Stung Treng as well as in adjacent Thailand. (Approximately 70,000 Kuy had been reported in Cambodia itself in 1978.) Most of the Kuy have been assimilated into the predominant culture of the country in which they live. Many are Buddhists, and the majority practice wet-rice cultivation. They have the reputation of being skilled blacksmiths.

=== Brao, Kreung, Kavet ===
The Brao, Kreung, and Kavet inhabit the northeastern Cambodian province of Ratanakiri and adjacent Laos. All three speak different, though mutually intelligible, dialects of the same language. They share a very similar culture, with matrilineal descent. In 1962 the Brao population in Laos was estimated at about 9,000. In 1984 it was reported that the total Brao population was between 10,000 and 15,000. About 3,000 Brao reportedly moved into Cambodia from Laos in the 1920s. The Brao live in large villages centered on a communal house. They cultivate dry-rice and produce some pottery. They appear to have a bilateral kinship system.

Kreung village near Ban Lung

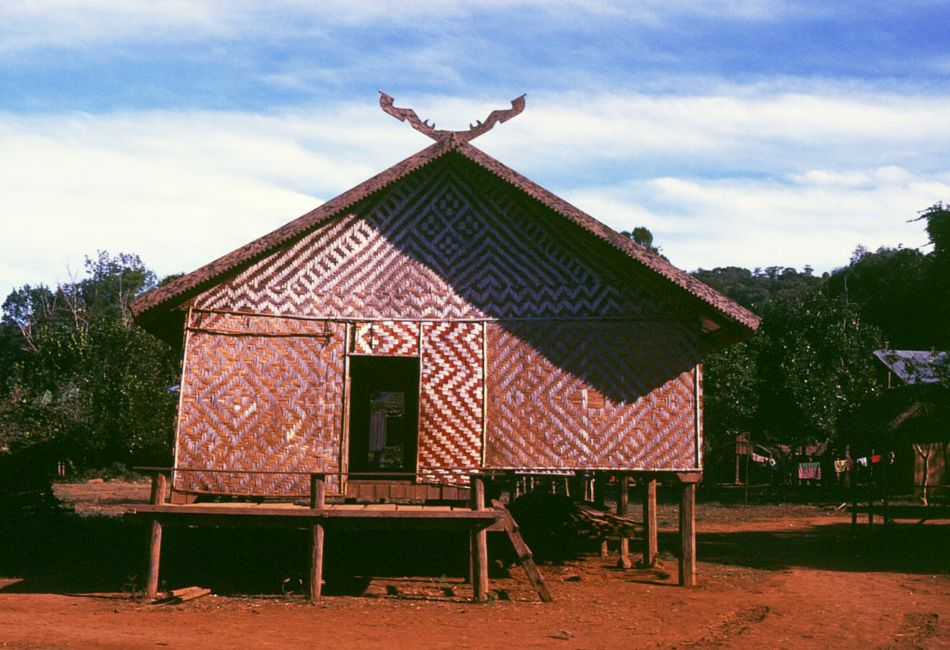
A meeting house

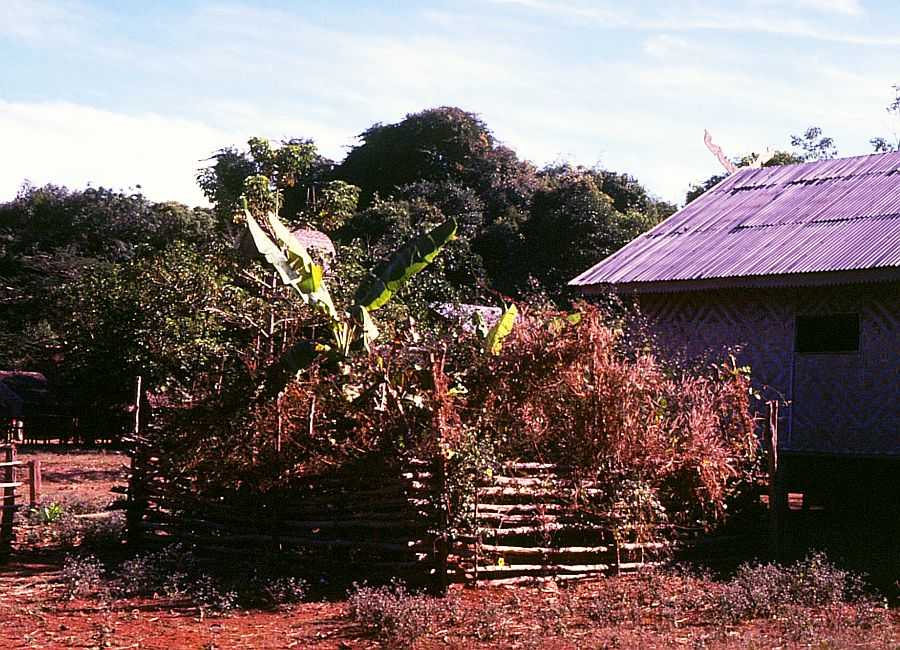
A sacred grove of a banana spirit

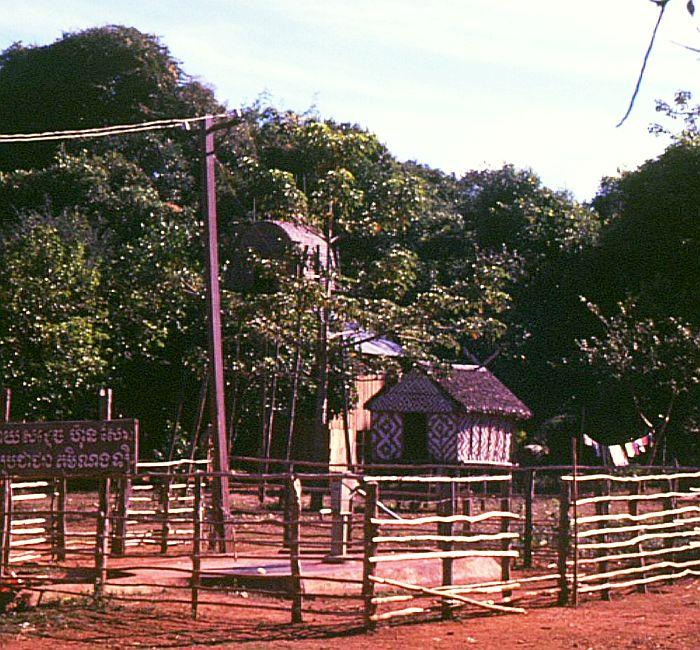
Cabins for unmarried youth

=== Tampuan ===
The Tampuan number about 25,000, according to a 1998 census. They have a Mon–Khmer language, and practice a form of animism. They have matrilineal descent.

The Tampuan live in the northeastern province of Cambodia, Ratanakiri. Many Tampuan live in villages close to Ratanakiri's provincial capital, Ban Lung, around a volcanic crater lake, Yeak Laom. Some live in scattered communities around the small town of Voeun Sai.

=== Bunong, Stieng ===
A total of 23,000 Bunong were thought to be living in Cambodia and in Vietnam in the early 1980s. In Cambodia the Bunong are found in Mondulkiri, Kratié, and Kampong Cham provinces in villages consisting of several longhouses each of which is divided into compartments that can house nuclear families. The Bunong practice dry-rice farming, and some also cultivate a wide variety of vegetables, fruits, and other useful plants as secondary crops. Some subgroups weave cloth. At least two of the Bunong subgroups have matrilineal descent. Monogamy is the predominant form of marriage, and residence is usually matrilocal. Wealth distinctions are measured by the number of buffalo that a notable person sacrifices on a funereal or ceremonial occasion as a mark of status and as a means of eliciting social approval. Slavery is known to have existed in the past, but the system allowed a slave to gain freedom.

The Stieng are closely related to the Bunong. Both groups straddle the Cambodian-Vietnamese border, and their languages belong to the same subfamily of Mon–Khmer. In 1978 the Cambodian Stieng numbered about 20,000 in all. The Stieng cultivate dry-field rice. Their society is apparently patriarchal, and residence after marriage is patrilocal if a bride-price was paid. The groups have a very loose political organization; each village has its own leaders and tribunals.

=== Pear, Chong, Saoch, Suoi (Pearic Group) ===
Several small groups, perhaps totalling no more than 10,000 people in Cambodia and eastern Thailand, make up the Pearic group. The main members are the Pear in Battambang, Pursat, and Kampong Thom provinces; the Chong in Thailand and Battambang Province; the Saoch in Kampot Province; the Samre in what was formerly Siem Reap Province; and the Suoi in Kampong Chhnang Province. Some believe that this group constitutes the remnant of the pre-Khmer population of Cambodia. Many members of the Pearic group grow dry-field rice, which they supplement by hunting and by gathering. They have totemic clans, each headed by a chief who inherited his office patrilineally. Marriage occurs at an early age; there is a small bride-price. Residence may be matrilocal until the birth of the first child, or it may be patrilocal as it is among the Saoch. The village headman is the highest political leader. The Saoch have a council of elders who judge infractions of traditional law. Two chief sorcerers, whose main function is to control the weather, play a major role in Pearic religion. Among the Saoch, a corpse is buried instead of being burned as among the Khmer.

=== Jarai ===
The Austronesian groups of Jarai and E De (also known as Rhade, or Rade) form two of the largest ethnic minorities in Vietnam. Both groups spill over into northeastern Cambodia, and they share many cultural similarities. The total Jarai population stands at about 200,000; the E De number about 120,000. According to 1978 population figures, there were 10,000 Jarai and 15,000 E De in Cambodia in the late 1970s. They live in longhouses containing several compartments occupied by matrilineally linked nuclear families. There may be twenty to sixty longhouses in one village. The Rade and Jarai cultivate dry-field rice and secondary crops such as maize. Both groups have exogamous matrilineal descent groups (consanguineous kin groups that acknowledge a traditional bond of common descent in the maternal line and within which they do not marry). Women initiate marriage negotiations and residence is matrilocal. Each village has its own political hierarchy and is governed by an oligarchy of the leading families. In the past, sorcerers known as the "kings of fire and water" exerted political power that extended beyond an individual village. The Rade and the Jarai have been involved intimately in the FULRO movement, and many of the leaders in the movement are from these two groups.

== See also ==
- Demographics of Cambodia
- Ethnic groups in Cambodia
