= Lao people =

Ethnic group

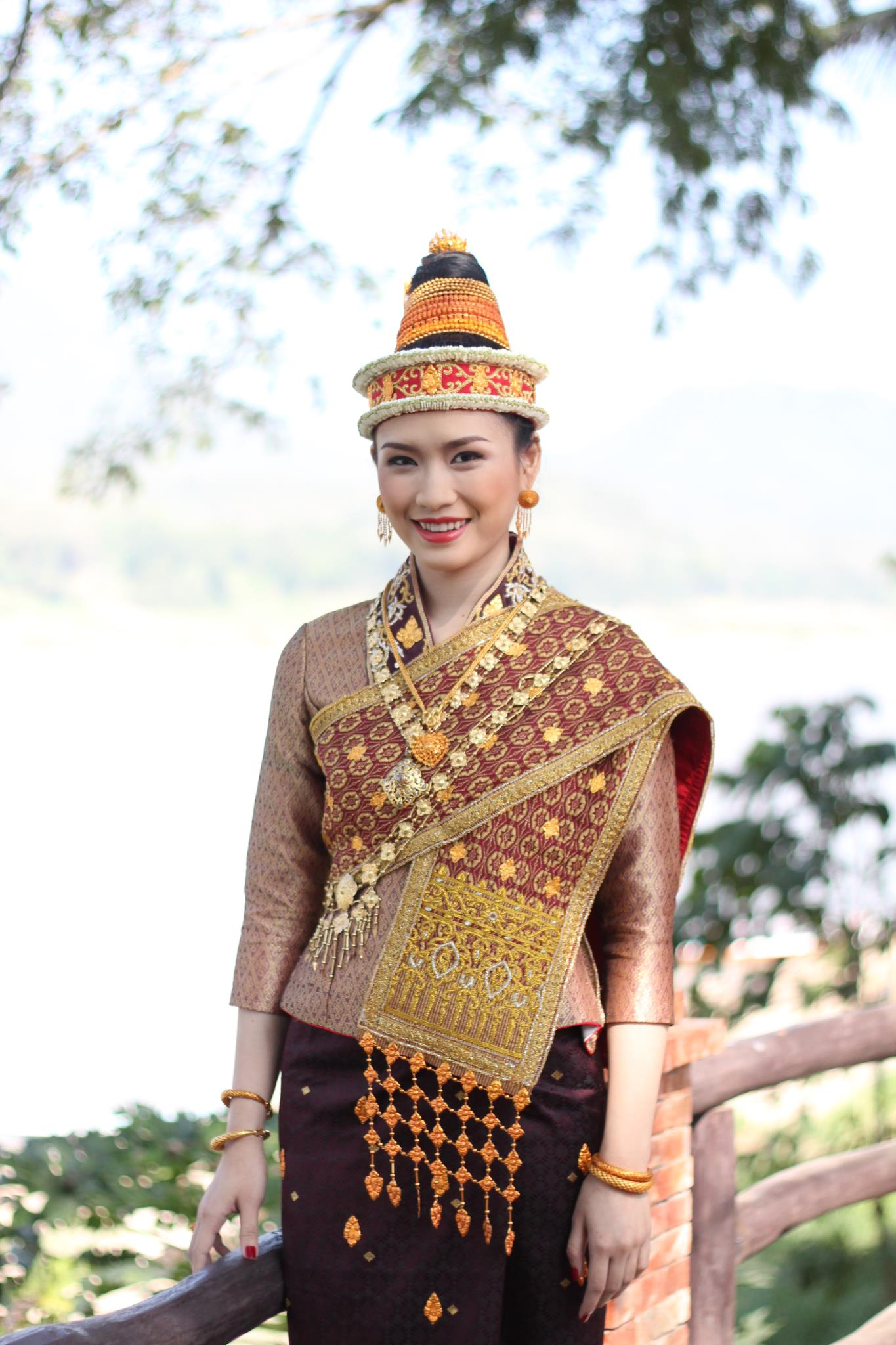
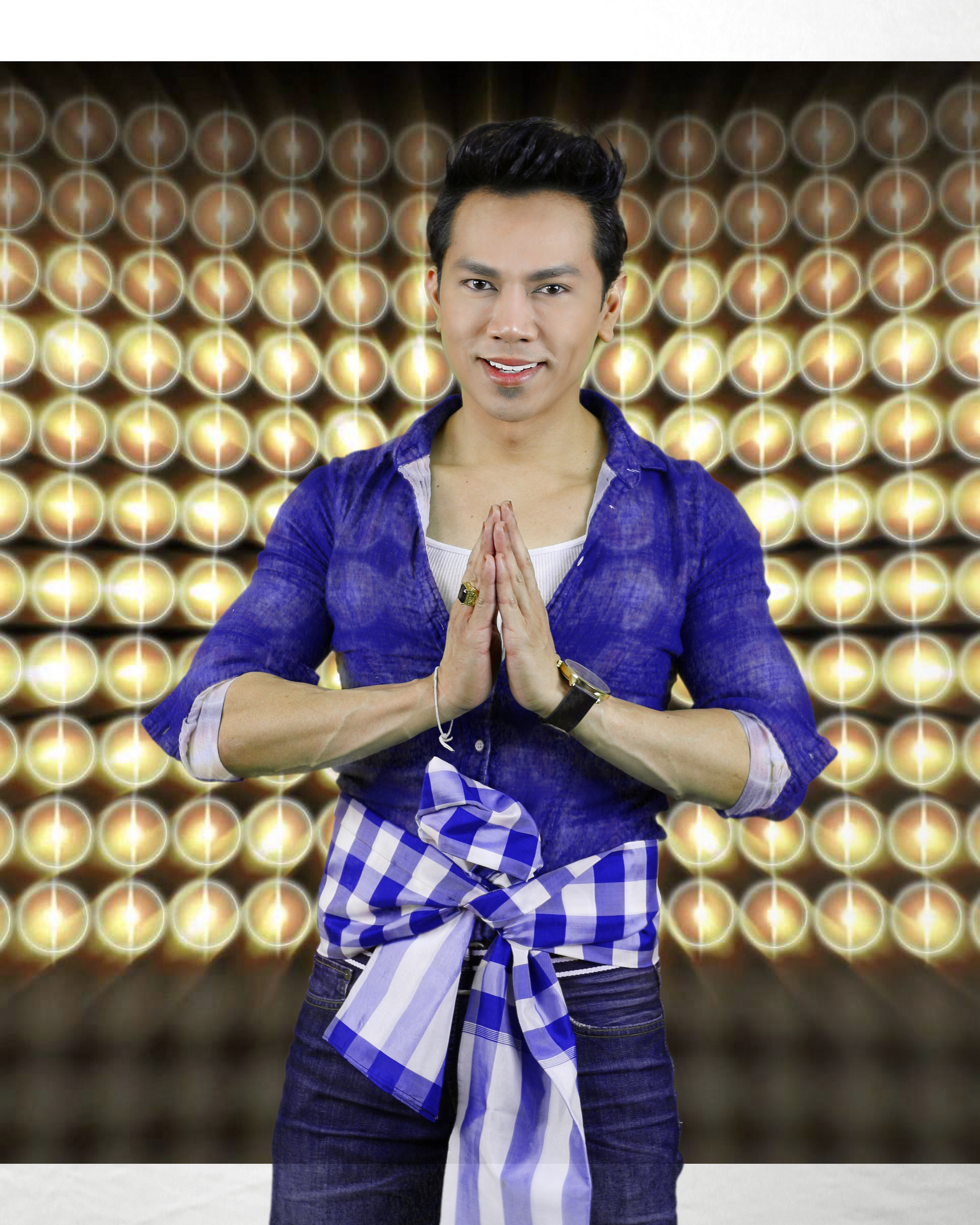
- Left: A Lao woman wearing traditional clothing in Luang Prabang, Laos; Right: A Lao man doing the sabaidee

Total population
- c. 22 million (including Lao Isan) (Note: 80% of Isan people are ethnically Lao.)

Regions with significant populations
- Laos: 3,427,665
- Thailand: 17,822,432 (including Lao Isan people) (2010)
- France: 200,000
- United States: 200,000 (2015)
- Cambodia: 23,400 (including Khmer Lao people)
- Canada: 24,580 (2016)
- Australia: 17,000
- Vietnam: 17,532
- South Korea: 10,520
- Germany: 4,000
- Japan: 3,602
- Singapore: 2,401
- Argentina: 2,000
- New Zealand: 1,374
- Belgium: 1,067
- United Kingdom: 1,000
- Switzerland: 1,000
- Sweden: 1,000
- New Caledonia: 1,000
- Guyana: 1,000
- Netherlands: 356
- Taiwan: 60
- Russia: 18
- Philippines: 13

Languages
- Lao

Related ethnic groups
- Other Tai peoples (e.g. Black Tai people, Isan people, and Dai people.)

The Lao people are a Tai ethnic group native to Southeast Asia, who speak the Lao language of the Kra–Dai languages. They are the majority ethnic group of Laos, making up 53.2% of the total population. The majority of Lao people adhere to Theravada Buddhism. They are closely related to other Tai people, especially (or synonymous) with the Isan people, who are also speakers of Lao language, native to neighboring Thailand.

Prior to Laos gaining independence from French colonial rule in 1953, the terms "Lao" and "Laotian" were applied interchangeably to all inhabitants of Laos, regardless of their ethnic background. Since independence, "Lao" has come to refer specifically to the ethnic group, while "Laotian" denotes any citizen of Laos, irrespective of ethnicity. Some countries and international organizations continue to use these terms interchangeably in their demographic statistics.

== Names ==
The etymology of the term "Lao" is potentially connected to ethnic groups identified as the "Ai Lao" mentioned in Han dynasty. Tribes descended from the Ai Lao included the Tai tribes that migrated to Southeast Asia.

According to the French linguist Michel Ferlus (2009), the ethnonym and autonym of the Lao people; nationality of the inhabitants of Laos is formed by the monosyllabization of the Austroasiatic etymon for 'human being' *k.raw. The peoples named Lao (lǎo 獠), supposed to be the ancestors of the Lao and some other Tai-Kadai populations, settled in the upper Tonkin and in parts of Yúnnán and Guìzhōu during the reign of the Táng:

lǎo 獠 < MC lawX < OC *C-rawʔ [C.rawˀ]

This reconstruction of the pronunciation for the phonogram 獠 confirms that 'Lao' originates in the etymon *k.raːw.

The English word Laotian, used interchangeably with Lao in some contexts, comes from French laotien/laotienne. The dominant ethnicity of Northeastern Thailand who descend from the Lao are differentiated from the Lao of Laos and by the Thais by the term Isan people or Thai Isan, a Sanskrit-derived term meaning northeast.

== Subdivisions ==
In Laos, the Lao and other Tai peoples with mutually intelligible languages are grouped together as Lao Loum or 'Lowland Lao'. The Lao Loum constitute the majority of the Lao people. The Lao Loum, literally meaning 'lowland Lao', are the inhabitants of the river valleys and lowlands along the Mekong River and make up over 68% of the population of Laos, of whom half are of the Lao ethnic group. Other members categorised as Lao Loum are some other Tai groups, such as the Phuan and Phu Thai.

Most of these groups share some cultural traits and speak dialects or languages that are somewhat similar, with some differences in tones, vocabulary, and pronunciation of certain words. Other groups, such as the Nyaw and Phuthai consider themselves distinct, and have differences in clothing that distinguish them.

== History ==
Map showing linguistic family tree overlaid on a geographic distribution map of Tai-Kadai family. This map only shows general pattern of the migration of Tai-speaking tribes, not specific routes, which would have snaked along the rivers and over the lower passes.

Tai tribes migrated into Southeast Asia between the 7th and 13th centuries AD, especially from what later is Sipsongbanna, Yunnan Province and Guangxi. The possible reasons that actuated Tai migration include migratory pressures stemmed from Han Chinese expansionism, Mongol invasions and incursions into Southeast Asia, the area's temperate climate and suitable land for wet rice cultivation, in addition to the fall of states that the Tais inhabited. According to linguistic and other historical evidence, Tai-speaking tribes migrated southwestward to what later are Laos and Thailand from Guangxi sometime between the 8th–10th centuries.

The Tai assimilated or driven out indigenous Austroasiatic Mon–Khmer peoples, and settled on the fringes of the Indianized kingdoms of the Mon and Khmer Empire. The blending of peoples and the influx of Indian philosophy, religion, language, culture and customs via and alongside some Austroasiatic element enriched the Tai peoples, while the Tais remained in contact with the other Tai mueang.

The Tai states took advantage of the waning Khmer Empire and emerged independent. From this point, the Tai states of the Chao Phraya River valley may be referred to as Siam.

While parts of Isan were settled and were part of Lanxang, some of the Lao were forcibly settled in the lesser populated southern and western regions or sent to boost the populations of Lao mueang loyal to the Siamese. The region's isolation from Central Thailand, and the population in Isan who were still attached to their cultural heritage helped preserve Lao culture. While Isan is a multi-ethnic region containing a mixture of Lao, Vietnamese, Cham, Mon, Khmer, and other Tai groups, it is majority Lao, and the Central Thais' perceived threat of Lao cultural and political dominance in the Isan region resulted in Thaification policies being enacted to finally integrate the multi-ethnic Isan people into Thailand. Since Lao dominance was seen as the greatest threat in the region, 'Lao' was removed as a category in the census, and policies were enacted. References to Lao people or its past were removed and the language was banned from schools and books, erasing Lao influence and impact to the country. The region has become more urban, and cities have sprung up. Due to the larger population and Isan's function as a voting bloc in elections, more attention to improving the region's infrastructure, business and education has come from the national government.

== Geographical distribution ==
Lao migration outside of Indochina first occurred during French colonialism in Laos that started in the 20th century. Lao students and workers came to France during this period, including members of the Lao royal family, and some resettled there permanently. Later Lao migrants were refugees who fled Laos after the Laotian Civil War and from the communist government. Primary places of asylum for the Lao refugees included the United States, France, Canada and Australia.

The 2010 United States census reported over 200,000 Americans of Lao descent in the country, a figure which excludes Hmong and Mien, and may include individuals of Tai Dam, Khmu, and other descent in addition to the Lao due to confusions between national and ethnic identity.

There are approximately 20 million Lao Isaan in Thailand, residing mainly on the Khorat Plateau in northeastern Thailand and in and around Bangkok. The government of Thailand has historically discouraged the Lao Isaan from identifying as or being identified as Lao.

== Language ==
The Lao language is a tonal, analytic, right-branching, pronoun pro-drop language of the Tai–Kadai language family. Most of the vocabulary is of native Tai origin, while contributions have come from Pali, Sanskrit and Mon–Khmer languages. The alphabet is an indic-based alphabet. The language is the official language of the Lao People's Democratic Republic and its official script is the Lao alphabet. The boundaries of Lao dialects extend into the North-East of Thailand, known as Isan, and the Lao spoken in Thailand as a whole can be differentiated by adoption of Thai vocabulary and code-switching. Thaification policies removed the alphabet and later the language is written in the Thai alphabet, if at all, and the name changed to Isan to sever the political connection with Laos. The Lao language is spoken by 20 million people, almost a third of the population of Thailand, and is the primary language of 88% of Isan households. It serves as a regional language and a badge of Isan identity, and is experiencing a decline in the advance of Thai.

== Other sources ==
- Lao settlement patterns in the U.S.
- Reports on languages spoken in Laos and Thailand, from Ethnologue.com
- Thongchai Winichakul. Siam Mapped. University of Hawaii Press, 1984. ISBN 0-8248-1974-8
- Wyatt, David. Thailand: A Short History (2nd edition). Yale University Press, 2003. ISBN 0-300-08475-7
- Xaixana Champanakone "Lao Cooking and The Essence of Life". Vientiane Publishing 2010. ISBN 978-9932-00-061-6
