= Tampuan people =

Tampuan
- Tampuan children from Ratanakiri

Total population
- 31,000

Regions with significant populations
- Cambodia

Languages
- Tampuan

Religion
- Animism

The Tampuan (endonym: "Om Poun"; also spelled "Tompuan", "Tompoun" or Tampuon, Tumpoun', Khmer: ទំពួន) are an indigenous ethnic group living in northeast Cambodia. Numbering about 31,000, the Tampuan people live in the mountainous Southern and Western portions of the Cambodian province of Ratanakiri. They have their own language of the Mon–Khmer language family.

Tampuans, along with the other Mon-Khmer groups of the mountains, are referred to as Khmer Loeu ("Upper Khmer") by the Khmer majority. In English, montagnards, a designation given to all hill tribes in the former French Indochina is often used. Though historically their language has been without a writing system, in the last ten years an NGO has overseen the creation of a writing system, based on the Cambodian alphabet. However, fewer than 80% of Tampuans are literate.

== Culture ==
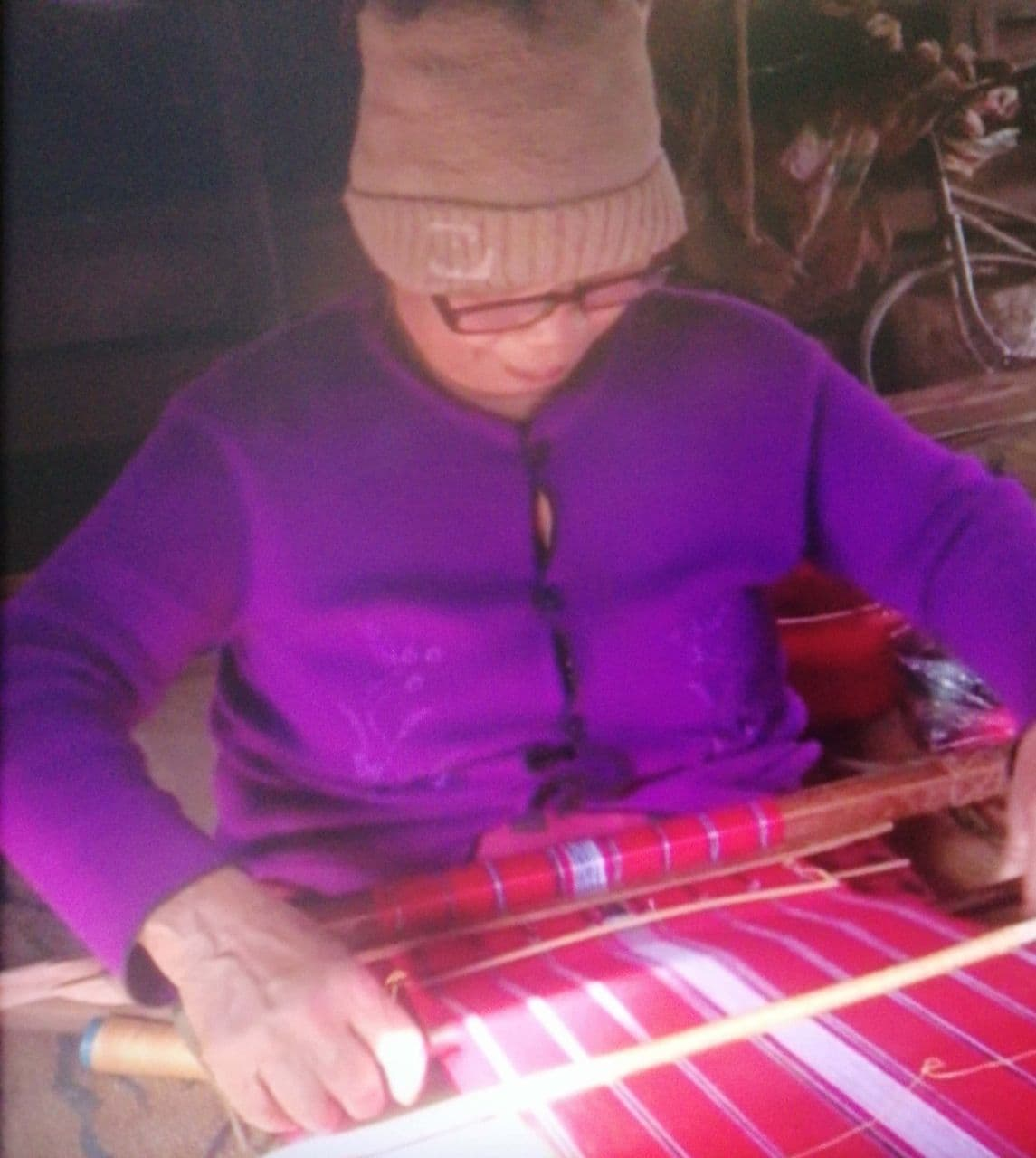
Tampuan woman weaving traditional fabrics

The Tampuan people are a mountain people, living in communal villages that range from 100 to 400 inhabitants. The villages are often laid out in a square, with a communal house (Tampuan: /raoŋ/), in the center. Today many Tampuan villages have a communal well, volleyball court, or rice mill in the center as well. In addition to a village home, most Tampuans have a second residence on their farm.

Houses are built on three- to 6-foot-tall (0.91 to 1.83 m) stilts to catch cool breezes. The walls, floor, roof and doors are made of split woven bamboo. Normally, houses are rectangular in shape, averaging five meters by three meters. Today, many rich Tampuans build wooden houses with corrugated steel roofs, a mark of luxury. In some areas, Tampuans live in communal longhouses that can be up to 200 feet (61 m) in length.

=== Family structure ===
Tampuans have a matrilineal system of marriage, with the family name and inheritance passing through the mother's side of the family. Normally, Tampuans marry between the ages of fourteen and eighteen. In accordance with tradition, the young couple lives with and serves the family of the bride for three years, and then moves to serve the grooms family for an additional three years. At this point, the young couple is considered to be of age, capable of starting their own farm. Bigamy is tolerated but not common.

The average married Tampuan woman bears six to eight children in her lifetime, but due to high infant mortality rates and poor medical care, fewer than six usually survive to adulthood.

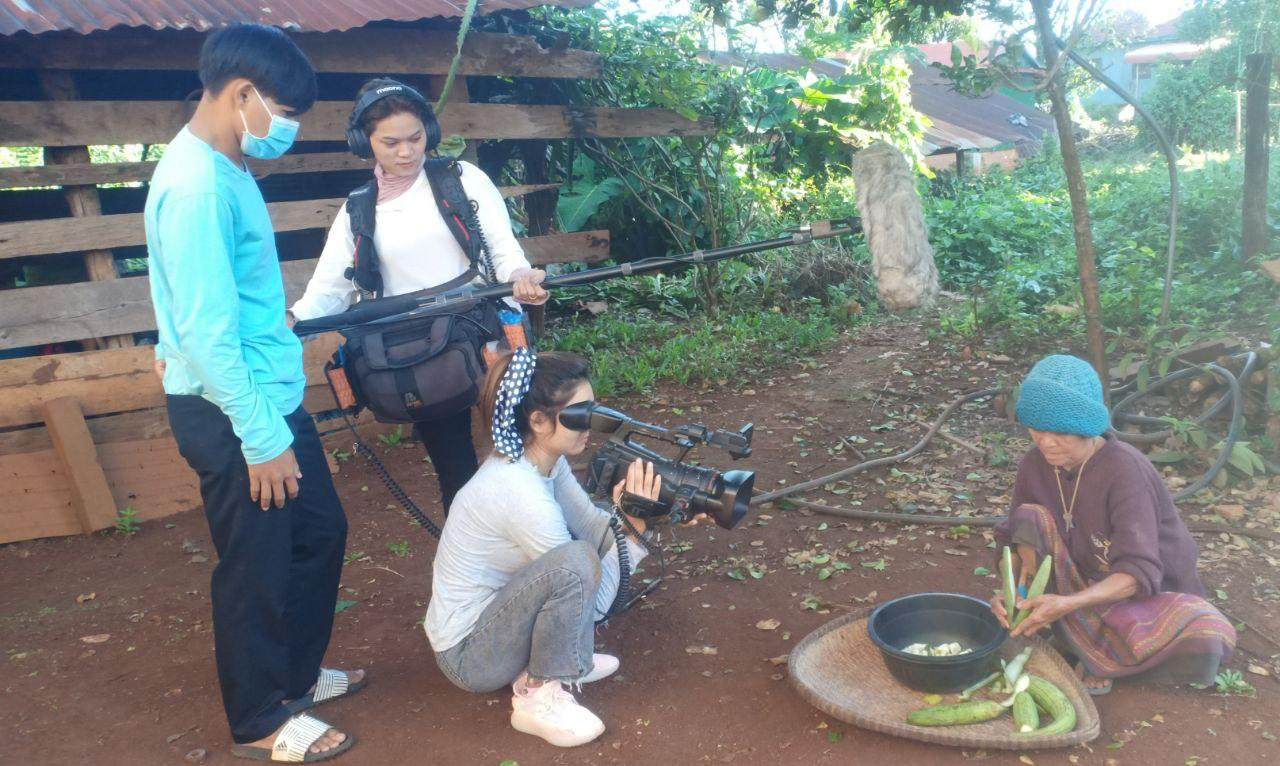
A Tampuan woman preparing vegetables for cooking

=== Diet ===
The Tampuan diet consists almost entirely of rice, supplemented by fish or stewed vegetables. Though Tampuans may raise chickens, pigs, dogs, cows, and water buffalo for food, the meat is rarely eaten apart from an animistic religious sacrifice. Tampuans also use crossbows or guns to hunt wild boars, pheasants, deer and small rodents. Bugs and ants are often consumed as snacks. Tampuans hold a number of foods to be taboo, according to the clan into which one is born.

== Agriculture ==
A Tampuan woman picking crops

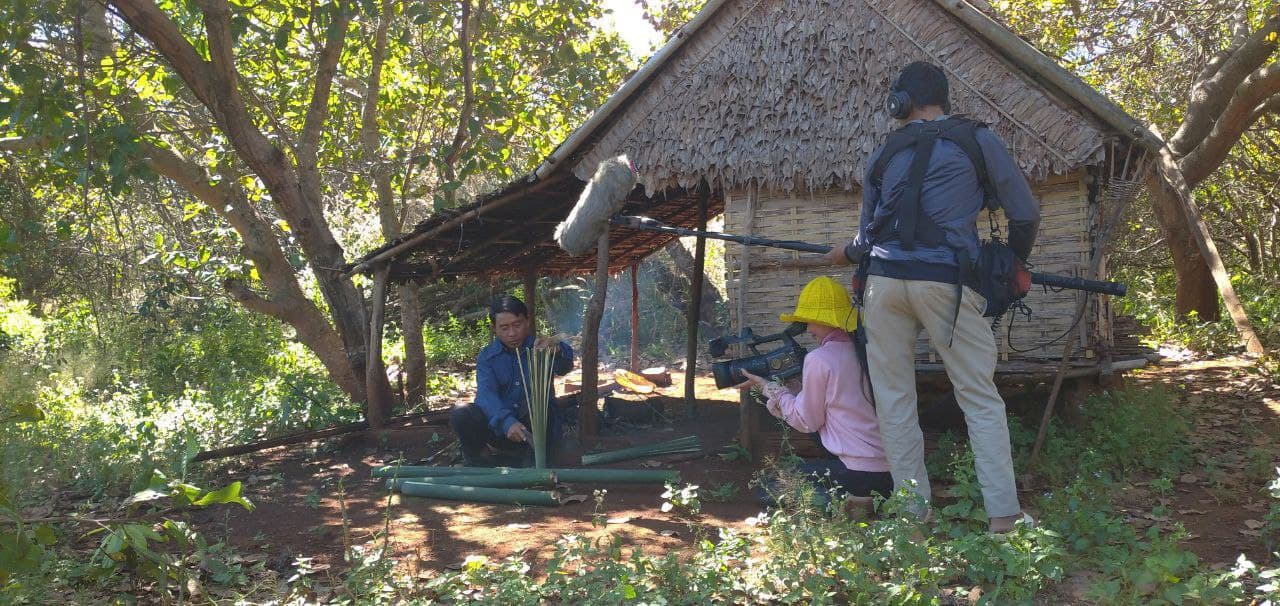
Tampuan man cutting bamboo

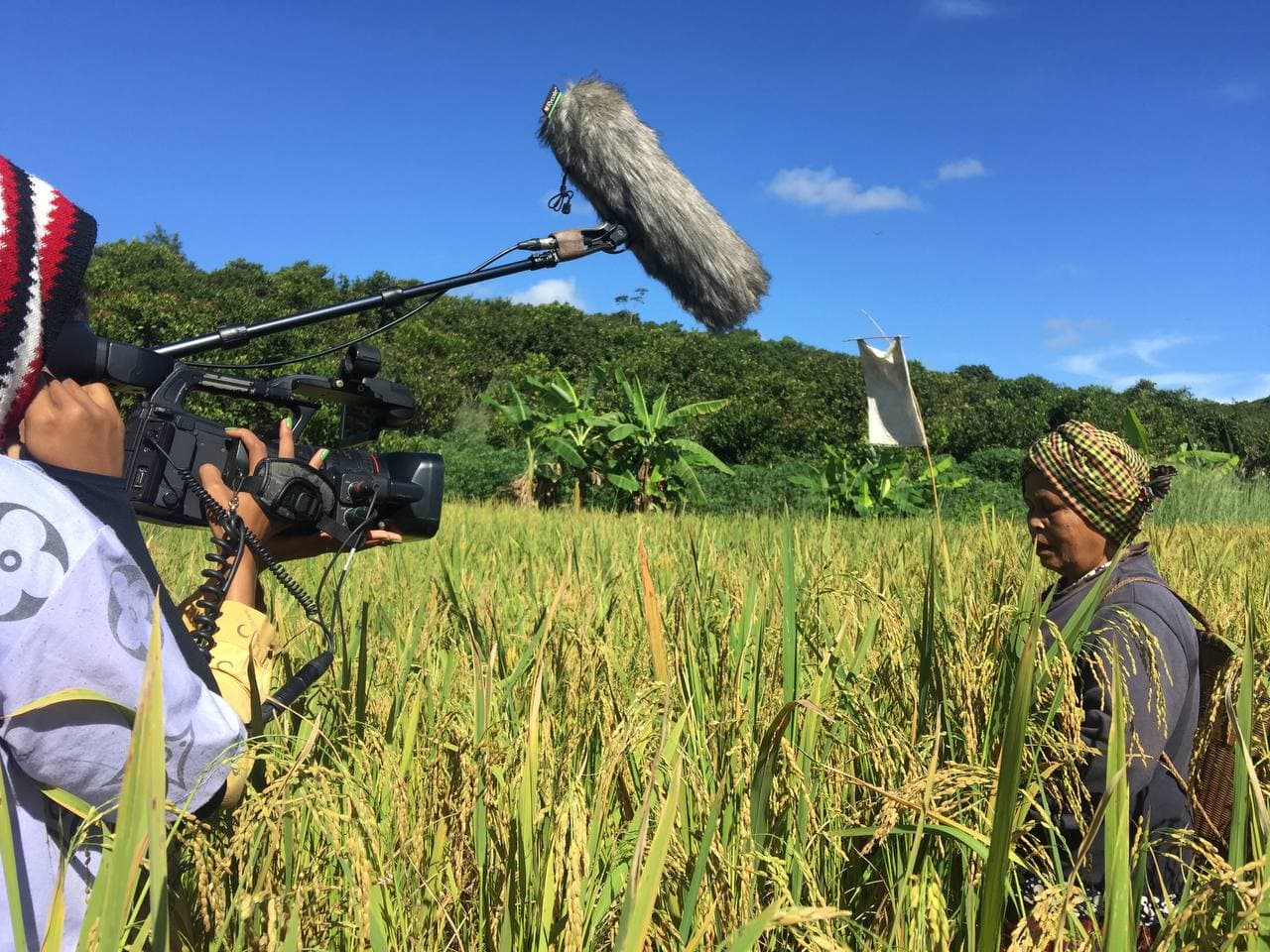
A Tampuan woman farming

Nearly all Tampuans are subsistence farmers, practicing a form of rotational slash and burn agriculture. The land surrounding the village is communally owned, with each village member planting on his designated section. When the nutrients on a particular plot of land are depleted, usually after two or three years, a new plot is cleared, burned, and prepared for planting. The previous plot is left to lie fallow for a period of years. The vast majority of Tampuans plant dry-land rice.

== Religion ==
Tampuans are animists, believing that spirits inhabit all things. Spirits, and especially evil spirits, must be appeased through animal sacrifices. Violating the evil spirit's commands causes sickness. Mediums and sorcerers are common, and are paid to speak the will of the spirits.

== Arts ==
A Tampuan string instrument

The Tampuans are a very musical people. They learn from a young age to play fiddles, stringed banjos, drums, flutes, and gongs. Gongs are their most important instruments. The gongs are made of hammered bronze, and consist of a set of five for rhythm and another set of eight for the melody. Playing gongs is a communal affair; thirteen men play gongs and two play percussion. Often the gongs are accompanied by dancing. Traditionally, men play instruments and women sing.

== See also ==
- Bahnaric languages
- Mon–Khmer
- Ratanakiri

General:

- List of ethnic groups in Cambodia
