= Kreung people =

Regions with significant populations
- Cambodia: 22,385 (2013 inter-censal survey)

Languages
- Kreung, Khmer

Religion
- Animism

Related ethnic groups
- Brao, Kavet, Lun

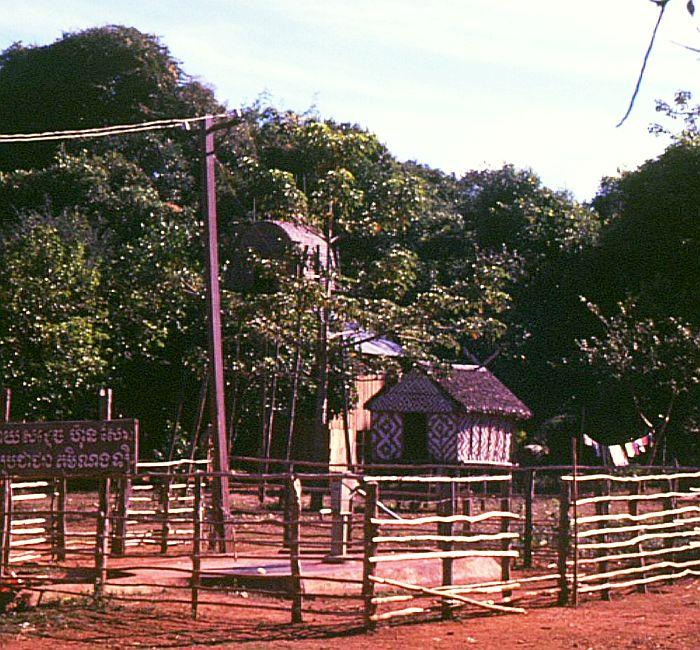

The Kreung (Khmer: គ្រឹង; Krung) are an ethnic group that live in Cambodia, mainly in Ratanakiri Province, and relatively small number in Stung Treng, Mondolkiri Province. There are 22,385 Kreung people in Cambodia as of 2013.

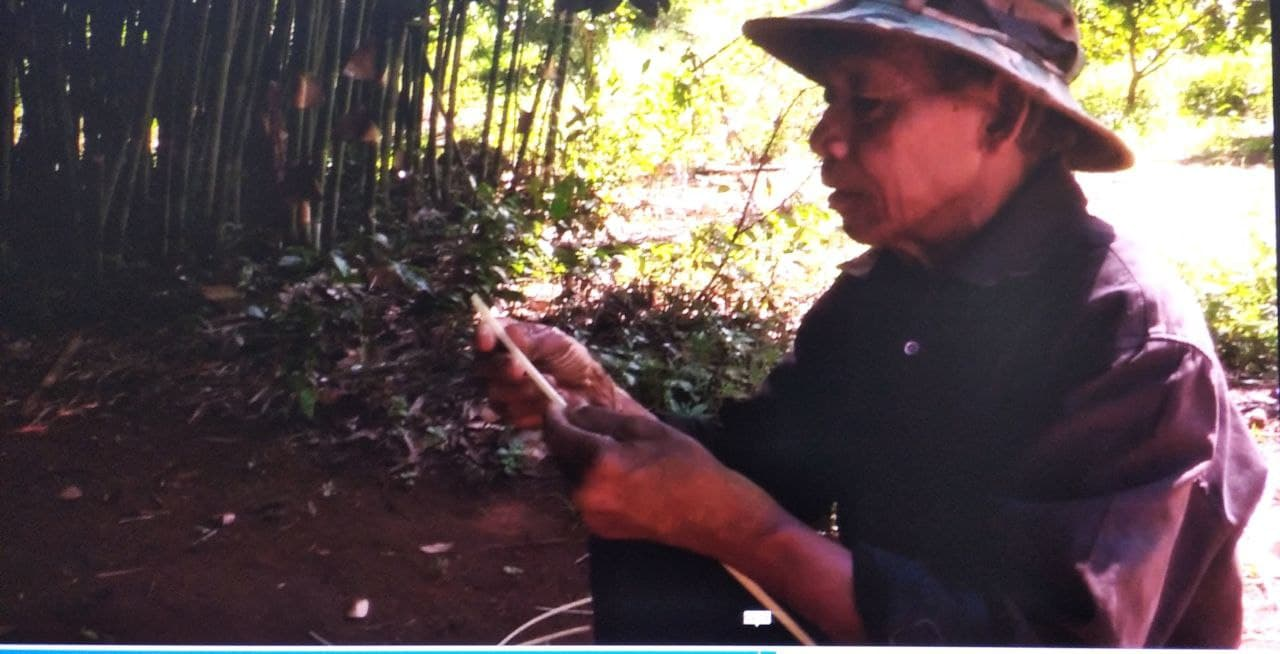
លោកអ៊ុំ កំពុងបិតឬស្សី

== Love hut tradition ==
IV-Mr. Ha Yerntang

This ethnic group has had a certain popularity because they have a certain originality in the relationships between men and women. Parents build a hut for their 13 to 15-year-old children to discover love and sexuality. Children can stay in this house until their twenties before choosing the person of their heart. It is a practice that is developing less.

== See also ==
- Khmer Loeu
