= Nyaw people =

Nyaw
Total population
- 120,000

Regions with significant populations
- Parts of Isan, Central Laos, Western Cambodia

Languages
- Tai Yo, Isan/Lao, Thai Khmer

Religion
- Theravada Buddhism

Related ethnic groups
- Other Tai peoples.

The Lao Nyaw, Thai Nyaw or Tai Yo (Thai/Isan: ไทญ้อ, Thai pronunciation: [tʰāj jɔ́ː], Isan pronunciation: [tʰɑj ɲɔː], Khmer: ឡាវញ៉) are an ethnic group of Thailand, Cambodia and Laos, scattered throughout the provinces of Isan such as Nong Khai, Sakon Nakhon, Nakhon Phanom, and parts of Bolikhamxai and Khammouan provinces of Laos. They are also referred to as simply Nyaw or Yaw, depending on either the Lao, Isan, and Nyaw pronunciation, which all pronounce the initial consonant as [ɲ], or the Thai pronunciation, which pronounces the initial consonant as [j].

== History ==
The Tai Nyaw believe that they are descendants of people originally from the northernmost part of Laos and Tonkin or immigrants during Tai migrations. Whatever the case may be, their dialect most closely resembles the Lao dialects from the regions east of Luang Prabang. Legend has it descendants are from the old king of Laos, who migrated after the overthrow and was forced to leave and spread out to neighboring countries for refuge. The Nyaw believed their ancestors are the king's personal guards and extended family.

== Language ==
The Nyaw language is very similar to the Lao language, which is referred to as the Isan language in Thailand. It is most similar to the Phuthai language also spoken within the same regions. Most Nyaw are often also fluent in Thai and Lao.

== Religion ==
The Tai Nyaw practise Theravada Buddhism, but have also maintained their original animist religion. Important to the Nyaw people is the tutelary spirit of the village, known in the dialect as ผู้เจ้า [pʰuː tɕaw].

== Status ==
In Thailand this language group is increasingly becoming integrated into the mainstream Isan language. This is due in large part to a campaign by the Thai government to modernize all Thai people, as well as due to outside influences of television, internet and local radio broadcasts. Most younger members of this northeastern tribal group in Thailand prefer to be called Thai rather than by their traditional tribal group name.

== Headhunters ==
Believed to be Nyaw indigenous headhunters who sought other tribes for bounty and sport, It was an honor to retrieve the heads of rival tribes as a trophy. Many traditional families still kept the severed skulls as charms and for use in black magic known as "Kong Dee". After the integration of Lao, Thai and Cambodian mainstream society the head hunts were deemed unacceptable.

== See also ==
- Hmong people
- Khmu people
