= Brao people =

Ethnic group of Cambodia/Laos border

Brao
Total population
- c. 60,000

Regions with significant populations
- Laos: 26,010
- Cambodia: 13,902 (2013) (Brao sub-group)

Languages
- Brao, Khmer

Religion
- Animism, Christianity, Theravada Buddhism

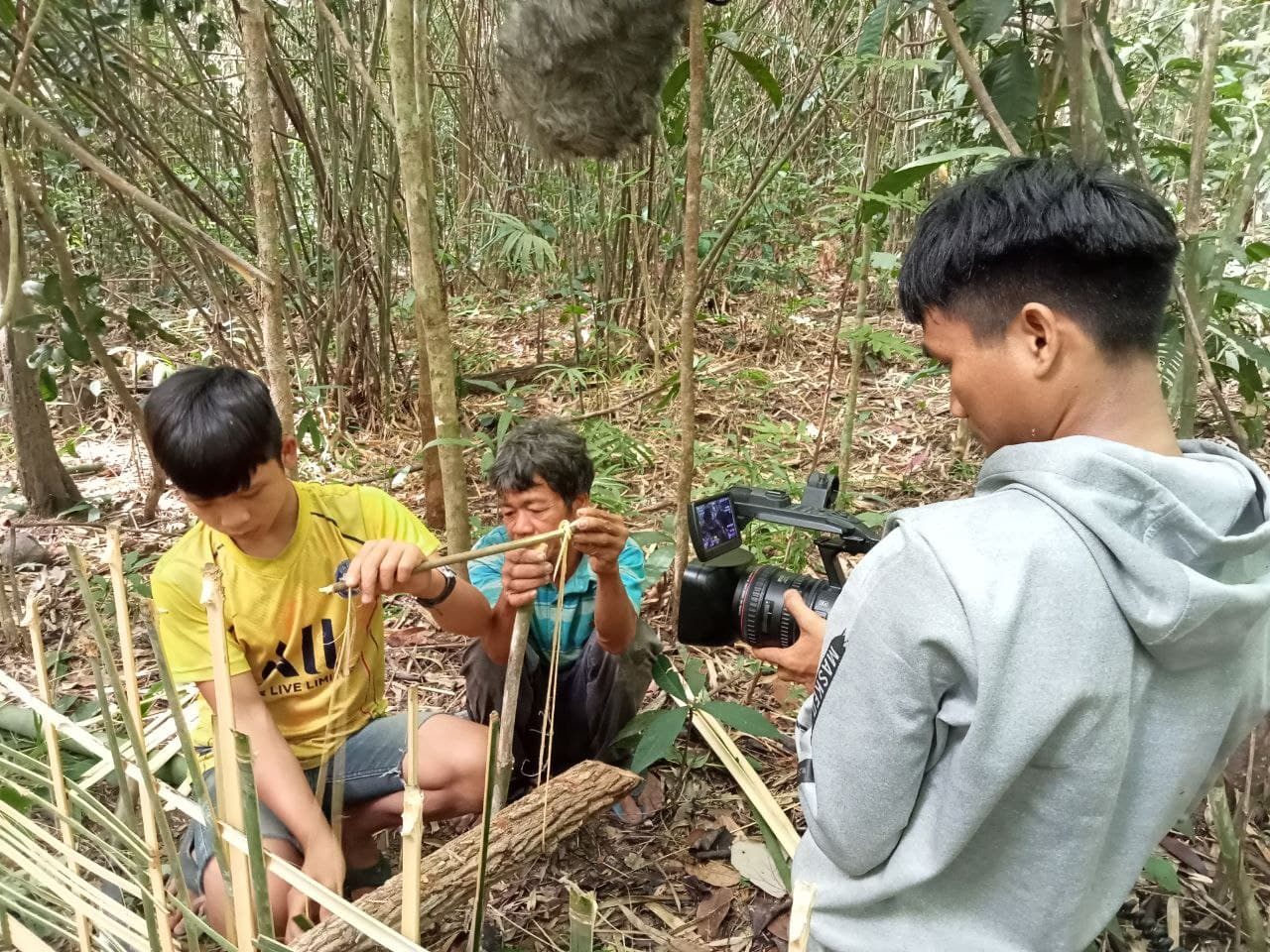
Indigenous youth documenting Brao language and culture in Ratanakiri Province in Cambodia

Brao people (Khmer: ព្រៅ, Prŏu [prɨw]) are an ethnic group that live on both sides of the Cambodia-Laos border. There are approximately 60,000 Brao people, broadly defined, worldwide. They mainly live in Attapeu and Champasak Provinces in southern Laos, and Ratanakiri and Stung Treng Provinces in northeastern Cambodia. In Cambodia, the Brao include people from the following sub-groups: Amba, Kreung, Kavet, Brao Tanap, and Lun. In southern Laos, they belong to the Jree, Kavet, Lun, Hamong and Ka-ying sub-groups

- Brao people speak various dialects of the Brao language, a Western Bahnaric Mon–Khmer language of Cambodia and Laos.
- Sometimes the Brao people are confused with the Bru, or the Brou, a Katuic Mon-Khmer language speaking group found in Khammouane and Savannakhet Provinces in southern Laos, and adjacent areas of Viet Nam. Some Bru people also live in northeastern Thailand.

The main religion of Brao is Animism, although "a small minority of the Brao in northeast Cambodia have recently converted to forms of evangelical Christianity." Brao variety of Animism focuses on appeasing "a wide array of malevolent spirits who manifest in various contexts and ways." Most rituals "require the consumption of a particular form of fermented rice-beer" as well as "sacrificing chickens, pigs, and water buffaloes and, less frequently, cows."

The Last Fortune Teller, a video documenting Brao language and culture produced by Indigenous youth Seb Hor in 2022

Some people confuse the Brao and the Brou/Bru because an anthropologist, Jacqueline Matras, who wrote about a Brao Tanap village in Ratanakiri Province, but spelt their name "Brou". However, linguists agree that the proper name is Brao.

== See also ==
- Brau people

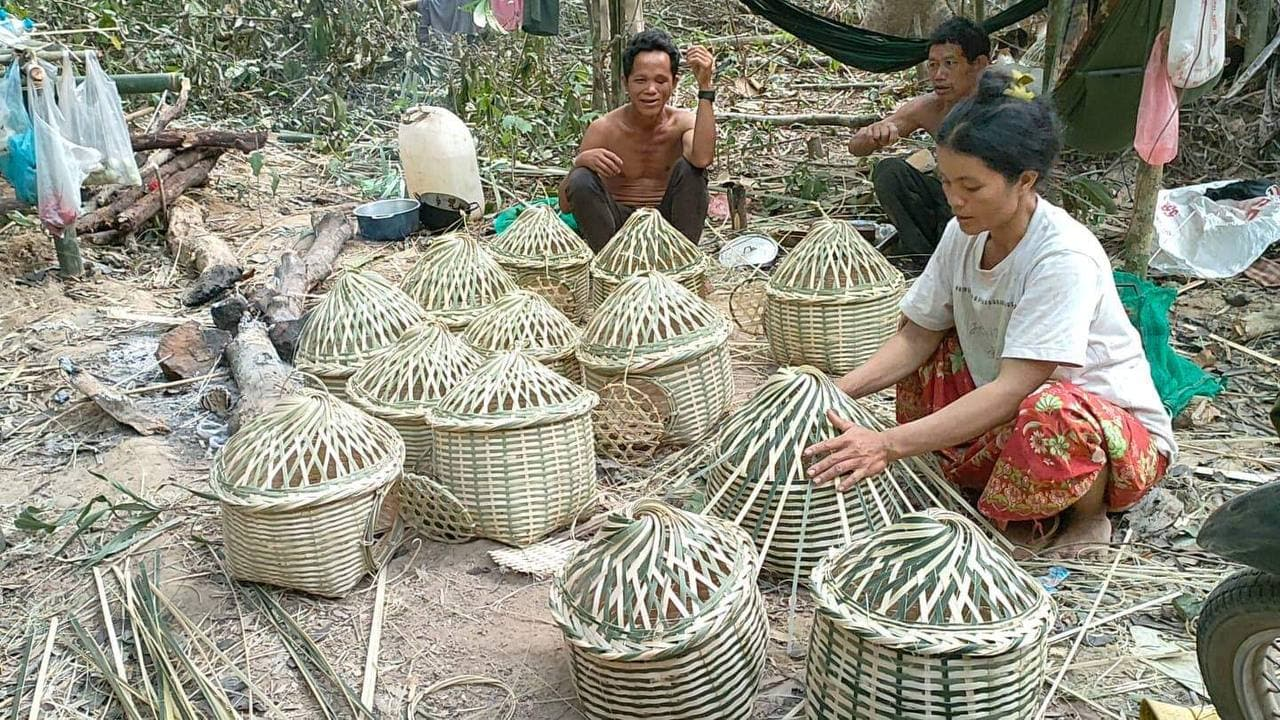
Brao Chicken Cage

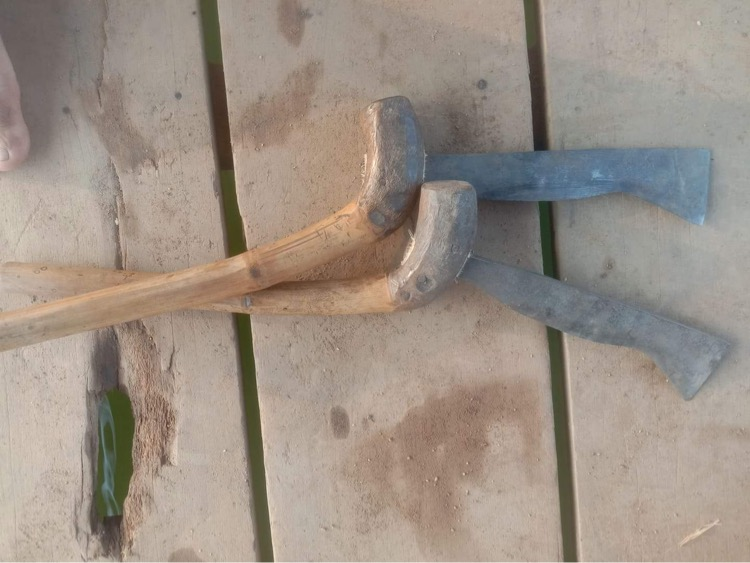
Brao knife

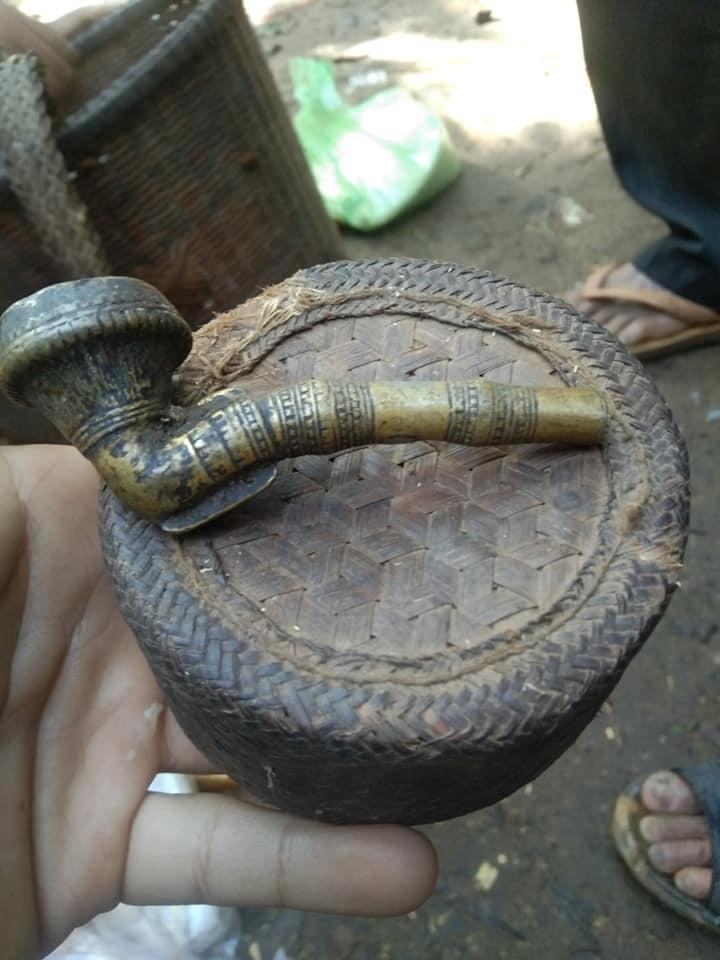
Brao pipe and basket

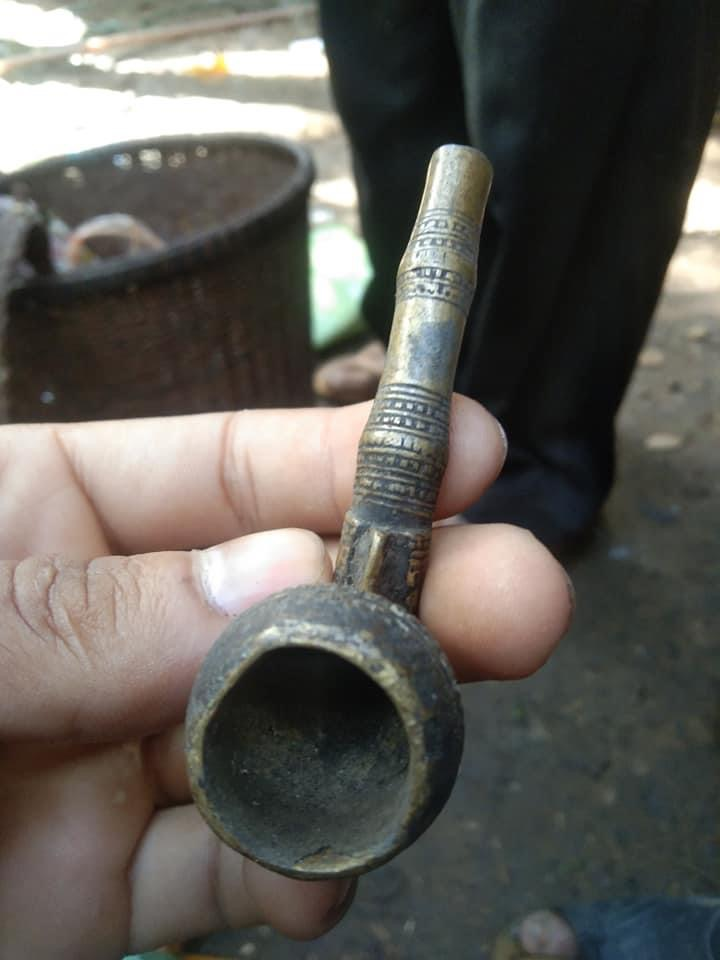
Brao pipe

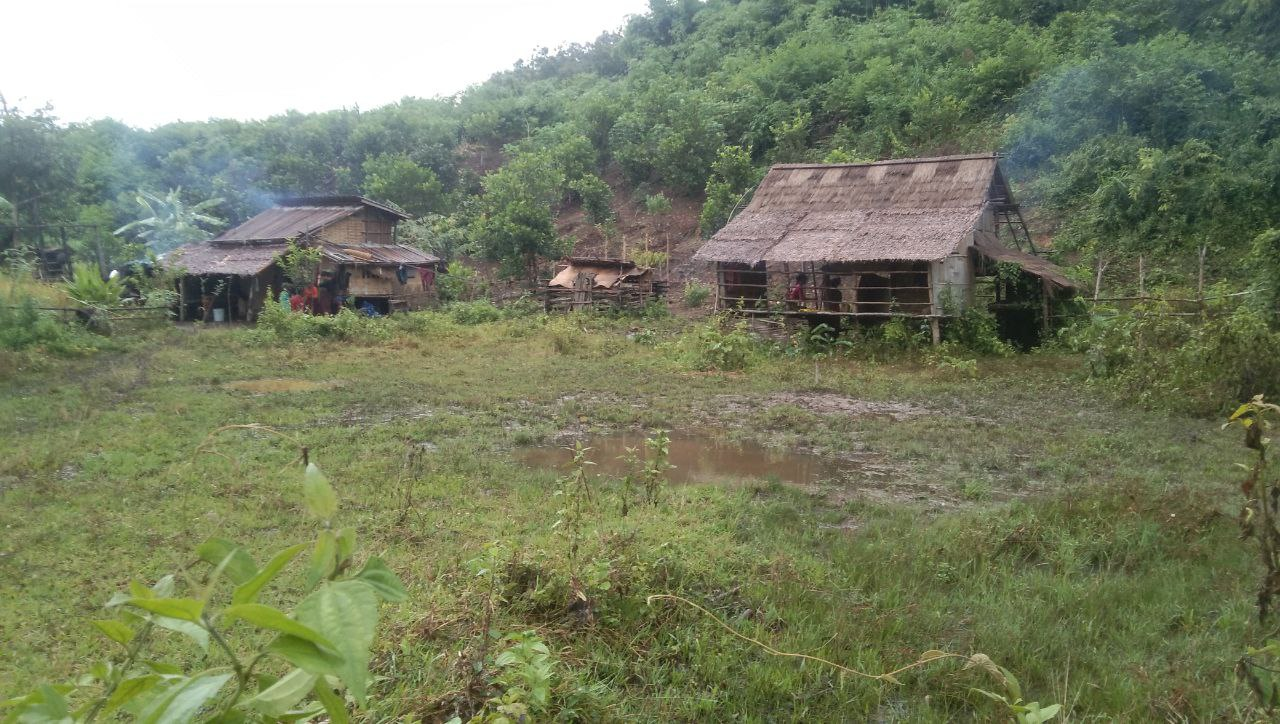
Brao Indigenous homes in Ratanakiri Province, Cambodia

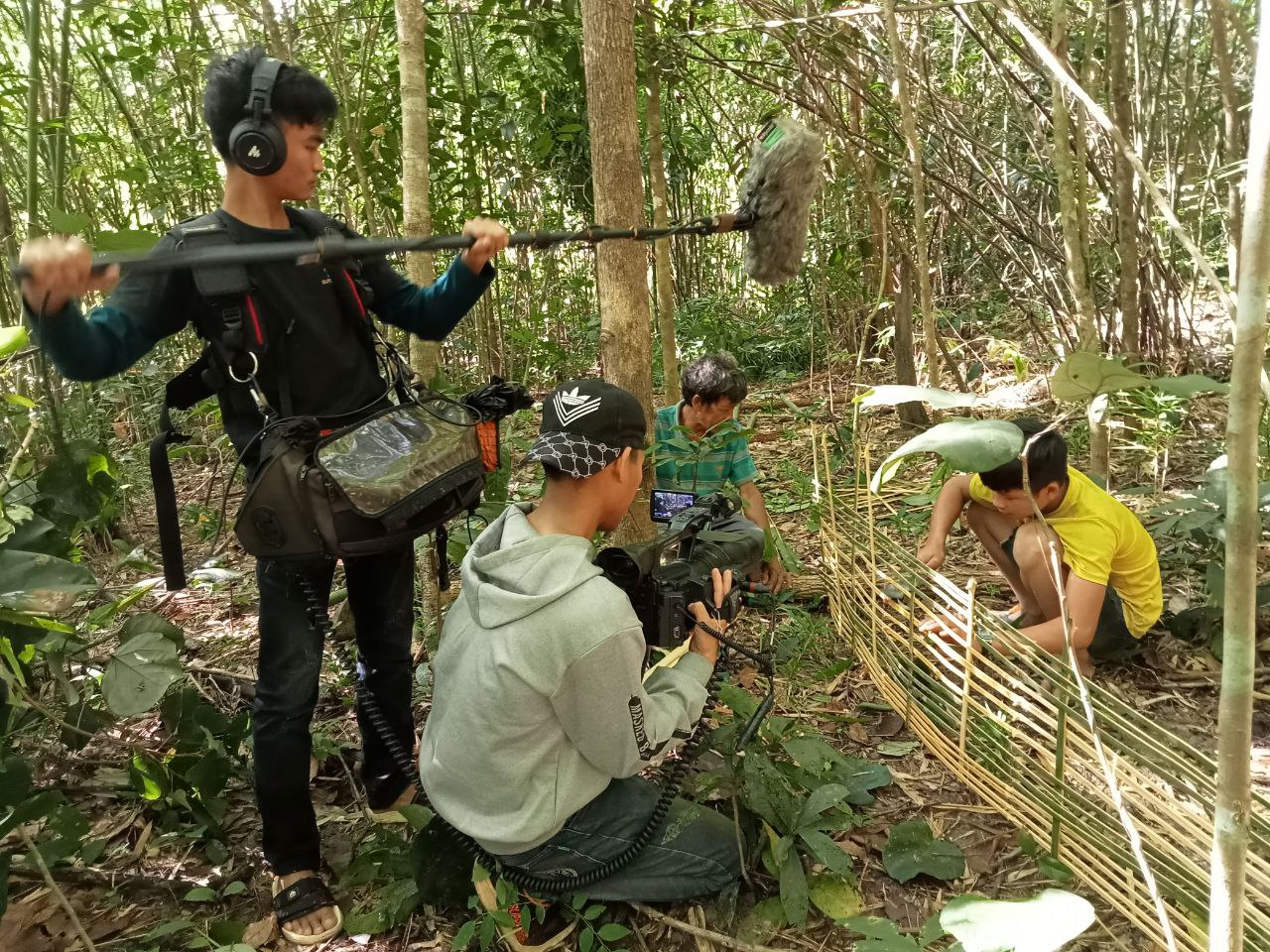
Indigenous youth documenting Brao men building traditional animal trapping

Traps, a video documenting Brao language and culture produced by Indigenous youth Pem Peak in 2022

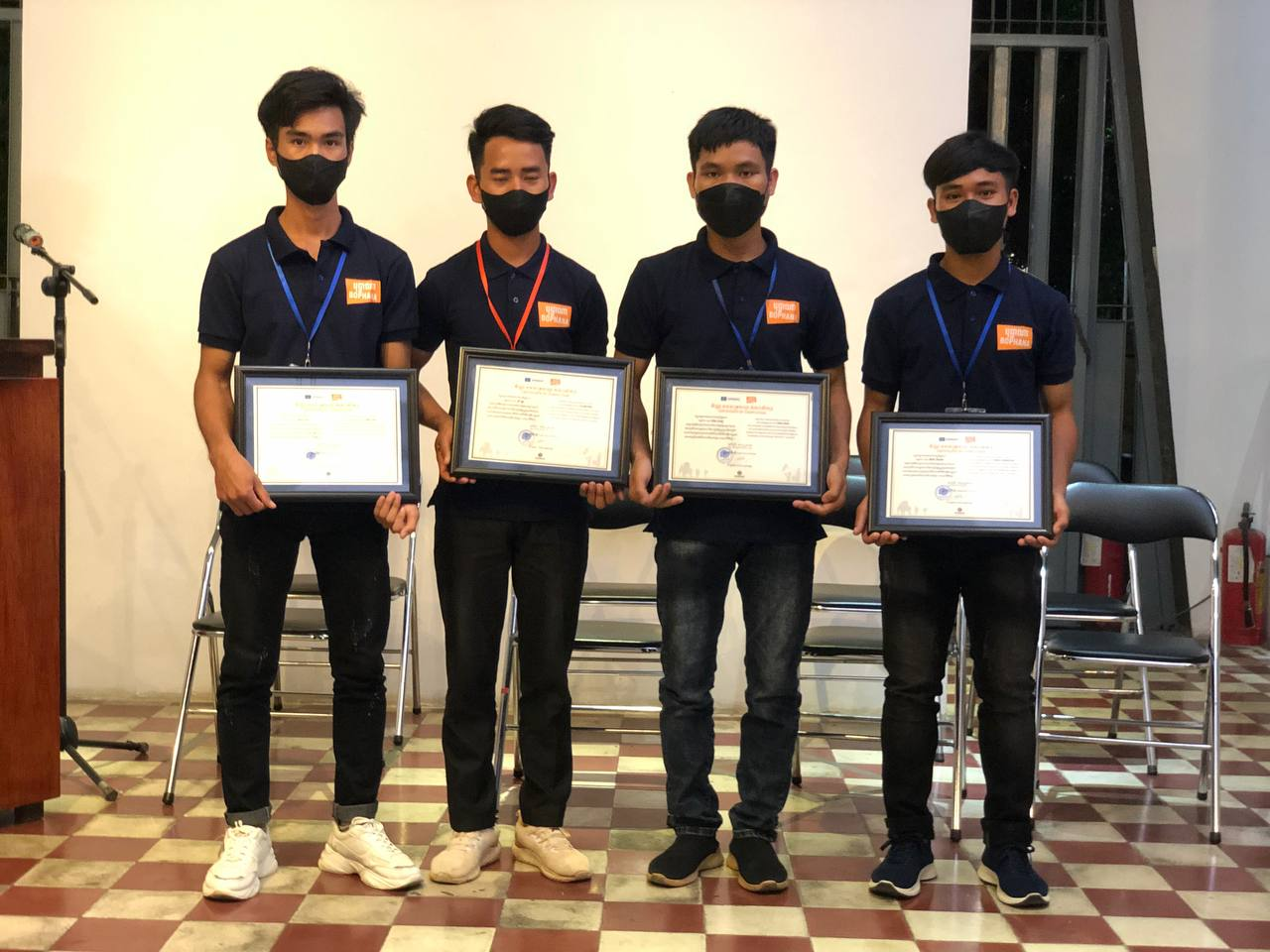
Group of filmmaking and wiki tools Indigenous youth trainees at their graduation ceremony on 25 February 2022

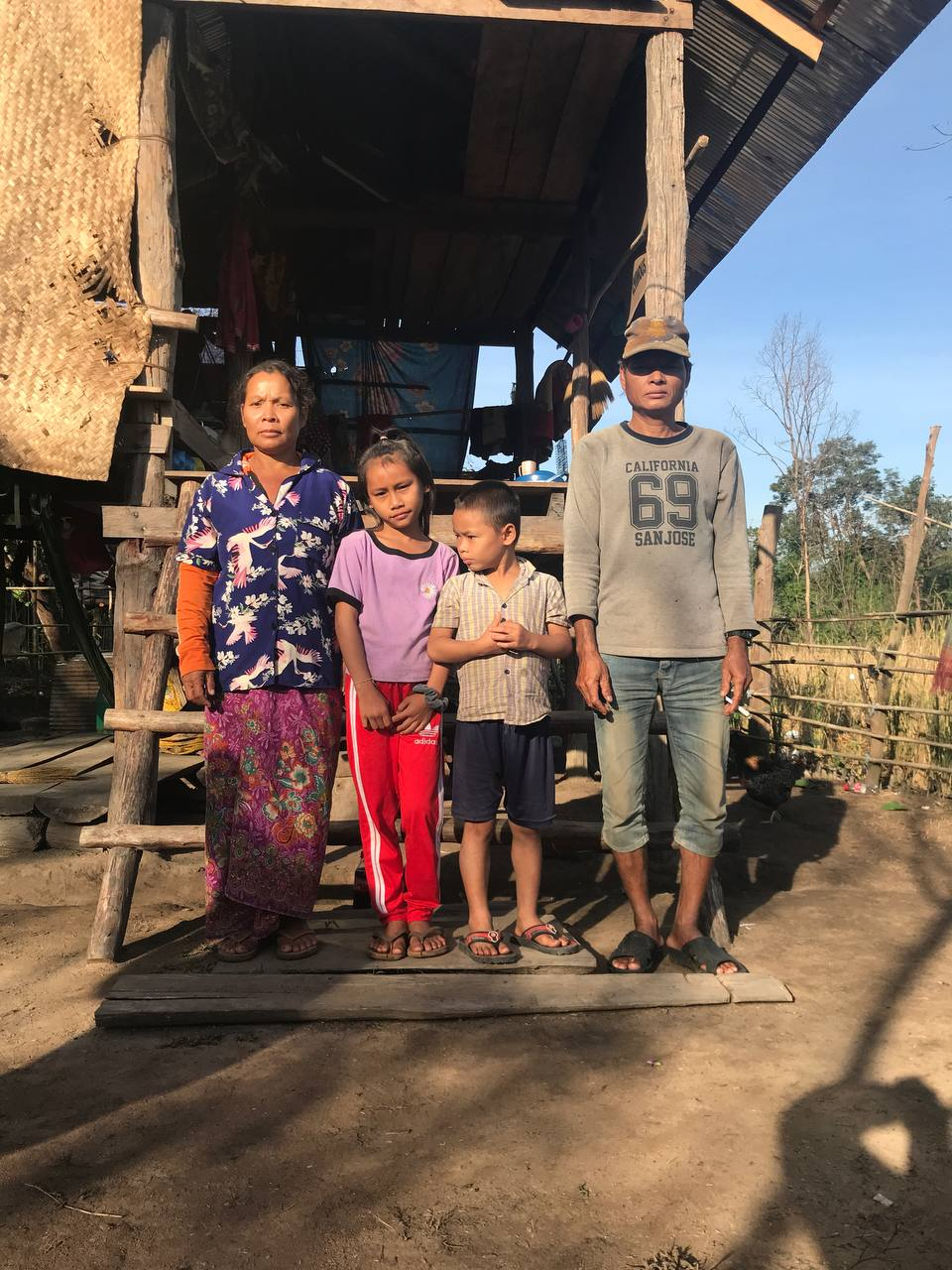
Brao olksinger Ean's family

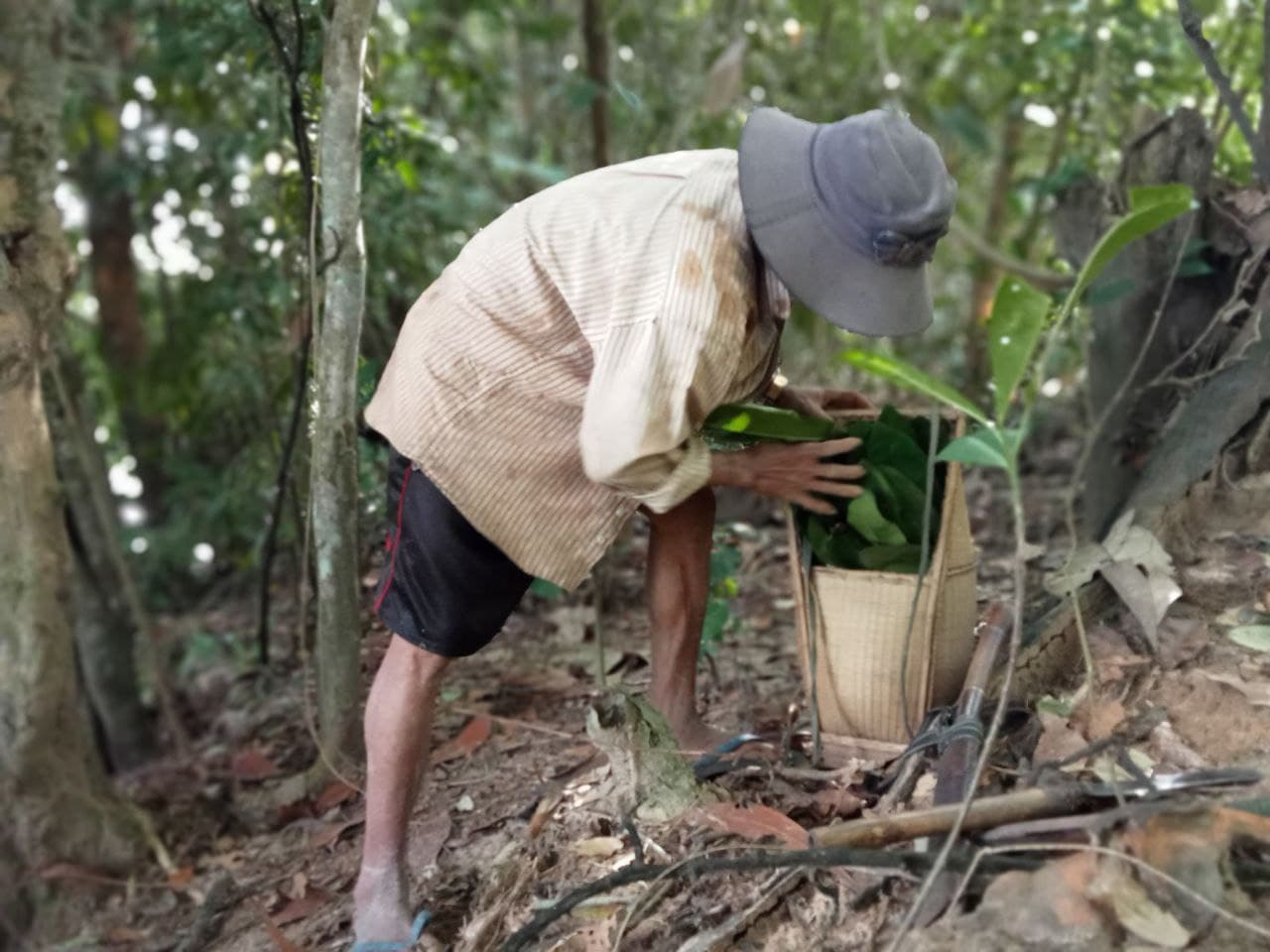
Brao elder picking leaves

Brao woman recalling the past, a video documenting Brao language and culture produced by Indigenous youth Haen Somkhan in 2022

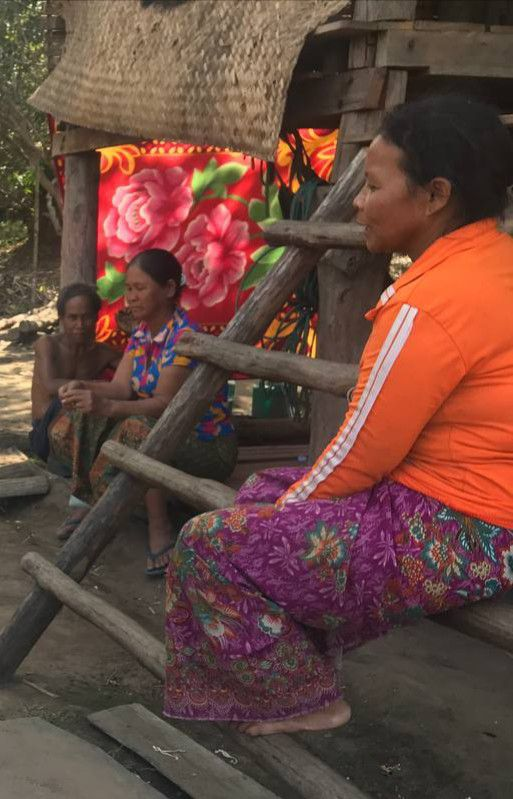
Interview with Brao women

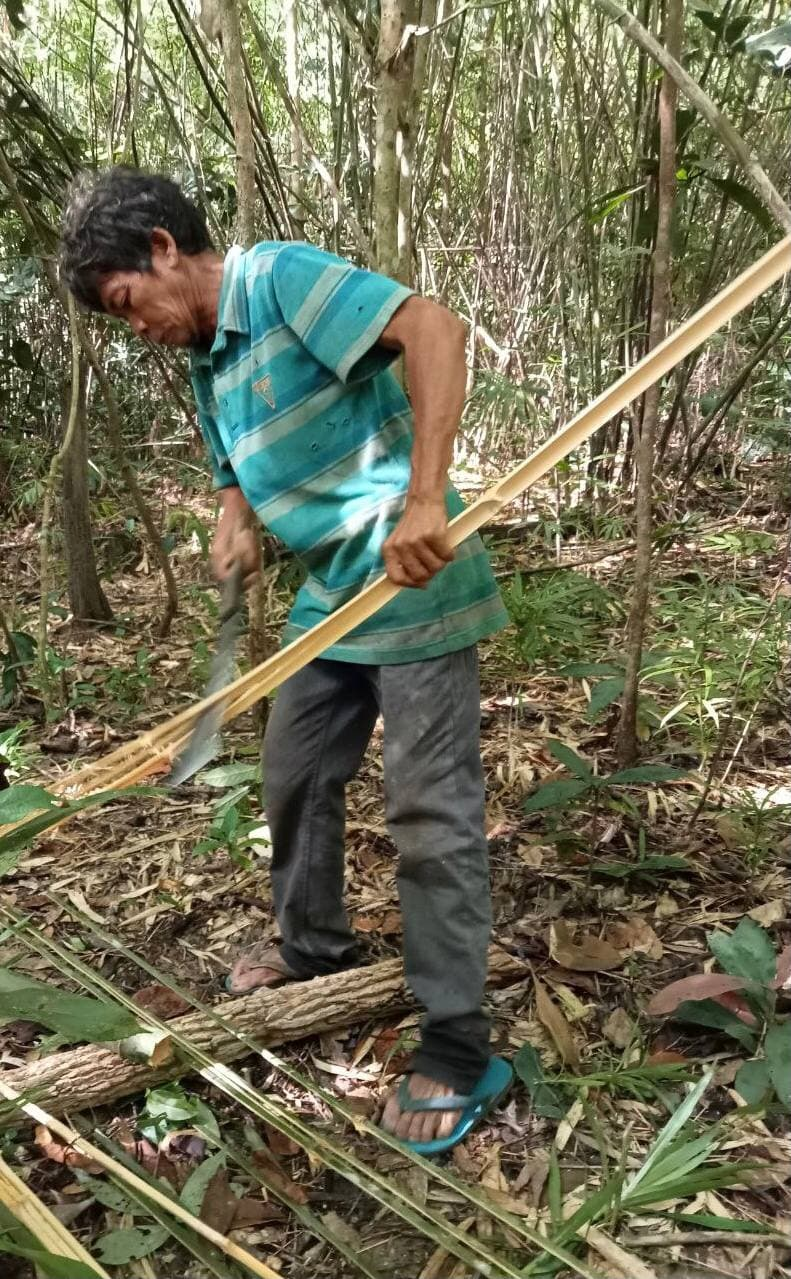
Brao man cutting bamboo

Brao men weaving a traditional 'angkeus' basket

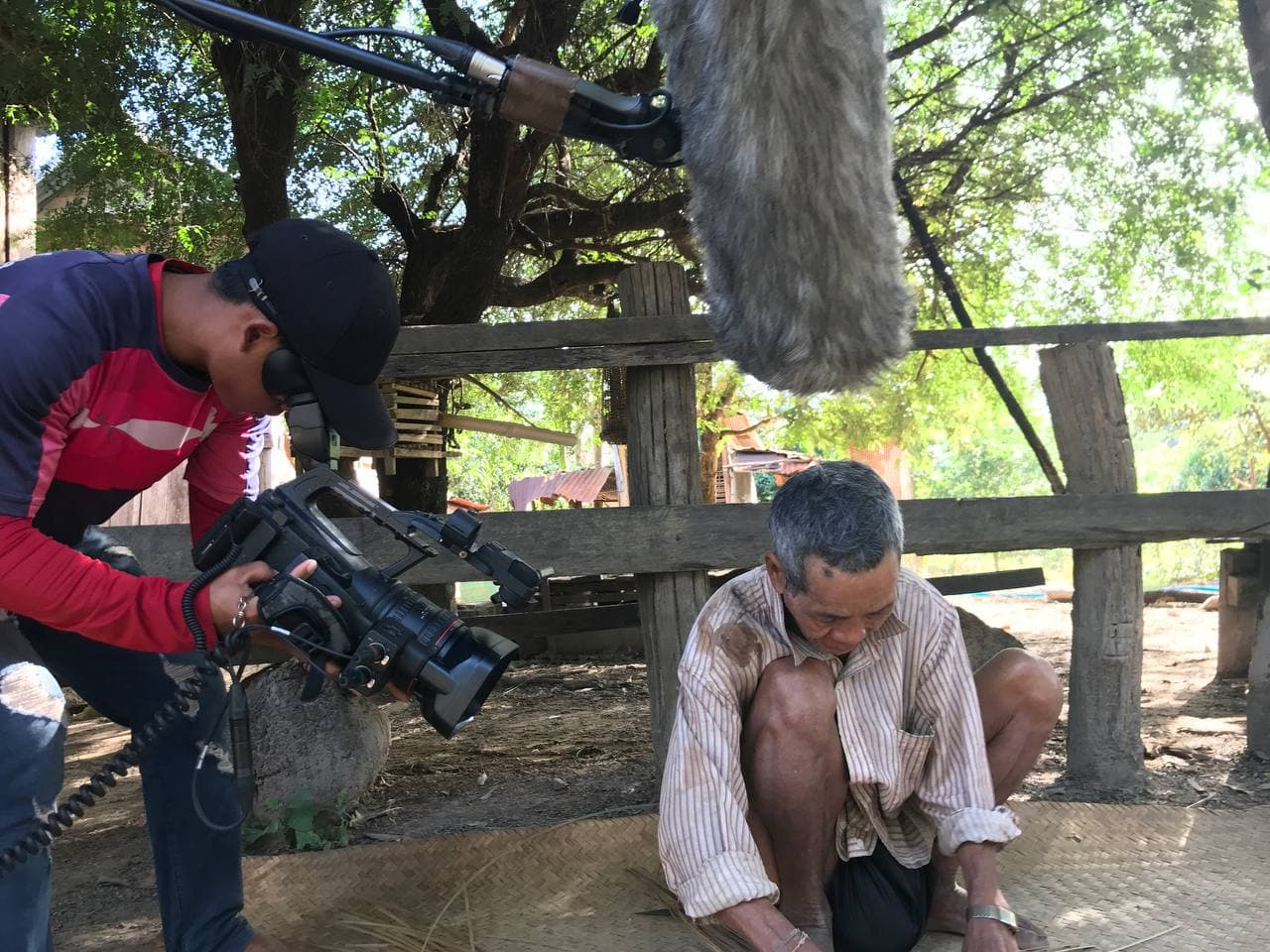
Brao elder weaving a 'angkeus' basket

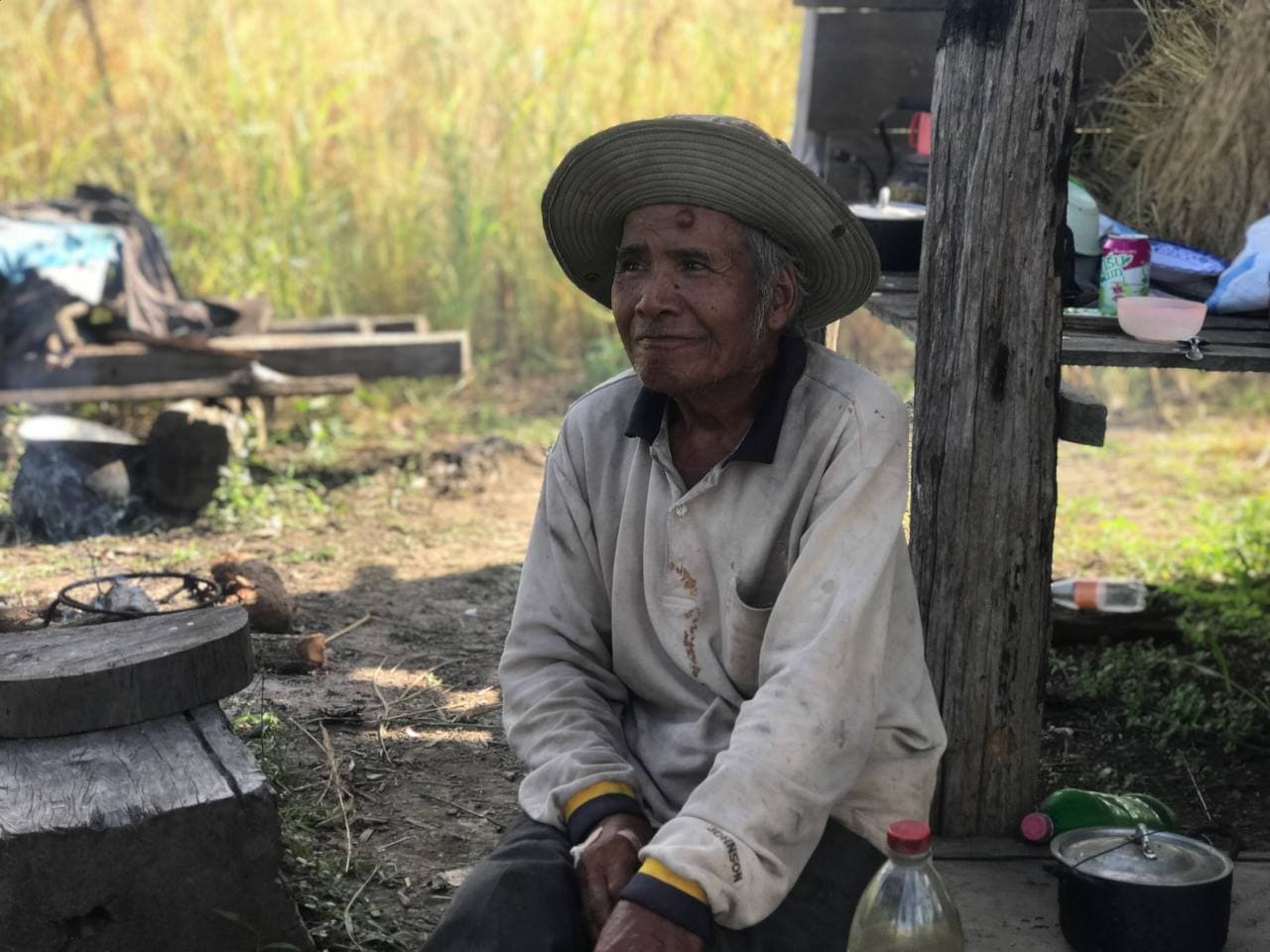
Brao Elder Luk Chov of Taveng District, Ratanakiri Province, Cambodia

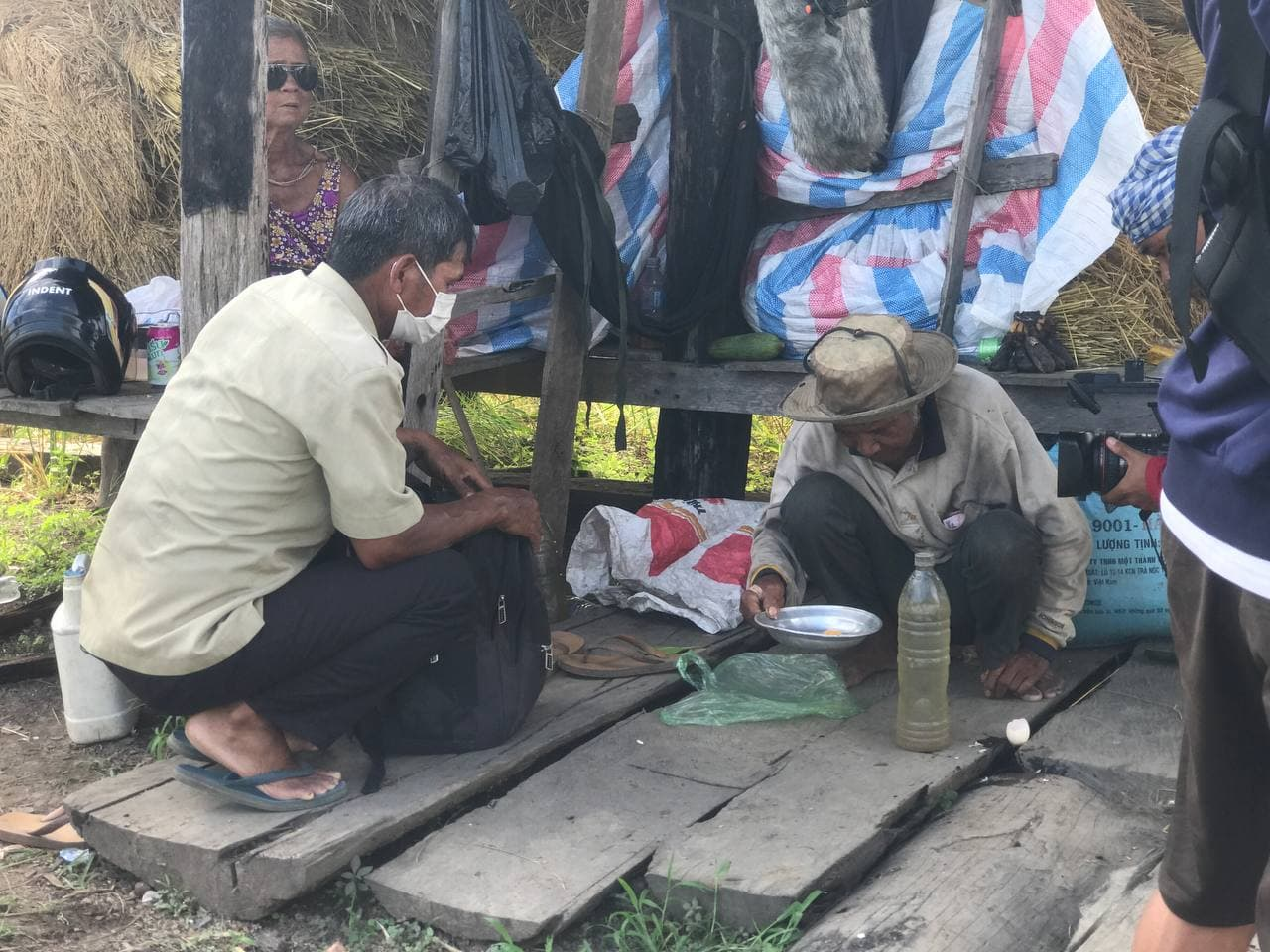
Brao elder telling the future
