= Elections in Cambodia =

Cambodia is a one-party dominant state with the Cambodian People's Party in power. Cambodia's legislature is chosen through a national election. The general election is held every five years in the fourth Sunday of July. The Parliament of Cambodia has two chambers. The National Assembly (រដ្ឋសភា Rôdthâsâphéa) has 125 members, each elected for a five-year term by proportional representation. The Senate (ព្រឹទ្ធសភា Prœ̆tthôsâphéa) has 62 members, mostly indirectly elected.

Since the signing of the 1991 Paris Peace Accords ending decades of civil wars and foreign occupation, and with the final elimination in 1998 of armed insurgency groups inside the country, six national elections have taken place in Cambodia. The first national elections were administered by United Nations Transitional Authority for Cambodia (UNTAC) in July 1993, the first commune-level election was held in February 2002 and the Cambodian senate was elected for the first time by the elected commune council officials in January 2006.

Three main political parties have dominated Cambodian politics over the last decade: the Cambodian People's Party (CPP), the United Front for an Independent, Neutral, Peaceful, and Cooperative Cambodia (FUNCINPEC) and, more recently, the Cambodia National Rescue Party (CNRP; party banned in 2017). Although the CPP dominated the elections held on July 27, 2003, it did not win the two-thirds majority required under the constitution to form a government on its own. A new government was formed on July 15, 2004, after protracted negotiations between the CPP and FUNCINPEC on forming a coalition government.

In early 2006 the CPP further consolidated its hold on power by passing an amendment to the constitution through Parliament that will allow for a 50% plus one majority in the National Assembly to form a government (instead of the two-thirds majority), thereby reducing its future reliance on FUNCINPEC or another coalition partner.

== Electoral registration ==
A poster in Tboung Khmum publicised by the National Election Committee encouraging voter registration ahead of the 2027 communal election

As of 10 October 2026, there are currently 10,193,288 Cambodians registered to vote.

=== Entitlement to vote ===
According to Article 34 of the Cambodian constitution, all Cambodian citizens aged 18 on election day are eligible to vote. Furthermore, under Article 12 of the Law on the Election of Commune/Sangkat Councils, for an individual to be included on the voter list, a person must have a valid Cambodian national ID card and have permanent or temporary residence in the commune they intend to vote in. Individuals who are serving a prison term or mentally disabled and placed under the guardianship of ministry or institution do not have the right to vote. There are currently no infrastructure or plan to facilitate voting by mail or embassy from the Cambodian government. Therefore, overseas voters are required to return to Cambodia should they desire to vote.

Khmer citizens of either sex shall enjoy the right to vote and to stand as candidates for the election.

Khmer citizens of either sex at least eighteen years old have the right to vote.

Citizens of either sex at least twenty-five years old, have the right to stand as candidates for the election.

Citizens of either sex at least forty years old, have the right to stand as candidates for the election of senators.

Provisions restricting the right to vote and the right to stand as candidates of the election shall be determined by law.

— The Constitution of the Kingdom of Cambodia, Article 34

Cambodian elections come in the form of both direct and indirect elections. Which will determine which individuals are eligible to vote in each respective election. Elections to decided commune chiefs and councilors and members of the National Assembly are universal, where all eligible voters are entitled to their right to vote. However, elections to decide the members of the Senate and municipal and provincial councils are non-universal. In such elections, only an electoral collage made up of commune chiefs and councilors are able to vote.

Election	Type of Election	Voting Eligibility for Citizens
National Assembly	Direct	All Cambodian citizens aged 18 or higher.
Communal	Direct	All Cambodian citizens aged 18 or higher.
Senate	Indirect	Commune chiefs; Commune councilors
Municipal	Indirect	Commune chiefs; Commune councilors

=== Registration procedure ===
A banner by the National Election Committee announcing the commencement of the 2026 voter registration period

A banner encouraging voters to update and check their details on the voter list website, provided by the National Election Committee

The National Election Committee is responsible for preparing, reviewing, validating and maintaining voter lists. The process of updating the voter list is overseen by the National Election Committee in annual voter registration periods. In these periods, the administration and notice of the voter registration is done by commune councils for eligible voters in each respective commune. In these registration periods, citizens who are eligible to vote but have not previously registered are invited to register during the registration period announced by the NEC, voters who changed their residence or temporary residence to a different commune are encouraged to update their registration. Deceased voters will also be also be removed from the voter list during these review periods.

=== Electoral register ===
Registered voters in elections since 1993-2023
Year	Number of people	+/-
1993	4,764,618	-
1998	5,395,595	▲13.20%
2002	5,190,307	▼3.80%
2003	6,341,834	▲18.15%
2007	7,799,371	▲18.68%
2008	8,125,529	▲4.01%
2012	9,203,493	▲11.71%
2013	9,675,453	▲4.87%
2017	7,865,033	▼18.71%
2018	8,380,217	▲6.14%
2022	9,205,681	▲8.96%
2023	9,710,645	▲5.20%

== Electoral system ==
=== National Assembly ===
All 125 members of the National Assembly are directly elected every 5 years via a closed list proportional representation through 25 multi-member constituencies which follow the boundaries of the provinces of Cambodia. Seats are allocated to parties under the d'Hondt method.

=== Senate ===
58 of the 62 members of the Senate are elected indirectly by commune chiefs and councilors. This election is conducted every five years via an indirect party-list proportional representation through eight multi-member constituencies, which consist of multiple provinces merged into a region. Seats are allocated to parties based on vote share using the D'Hondt method.

In addition, four seats are appointed, two by the monarch and two by the National Assembly.

Regions	Provinces	Seats
Region 1	Phnom Penh	6
Region 2	Kampong Cham, Tboung Khmum	8
Region 3	Kandal	5
Region 4	Banteay Meachey, Battambang, Siem Reap, Pailin, Oddar Meanchey	10
Region 5	Kampot, Kep, Takeo	7
Region 6	Prey Veng, Svay Rieng	7
Region 7	Kampong Chhnang, Kampong Speu, Preah Sihanouk, Koh Kong, Pursat	9
Region 8	Kampong Thom, Preah Vihear, Kratie, Strung Treng, Ratanakiri, Mondulkiri	6

=== Communal ===
==== Commune Chiefs ====
All commune chiefs are elected by first past the post, where a simple plurality in a single round of voting is needed to win.

==== Commune Councilors ====
Under Sub-Decree 107, communes are limited to the following number of councillors per commune only, where the decision the size of the council is to be decided by "geographical and demographic factors" according to the National Election Committee (NEC). Where the council is elected using closed list proportional representation, under the d'Hondt method. However, if a party obtains 2/3rds of the vote share, all deputy chief seats are awarded automatically to the respective party.

Number of possible seat allocations in commune councils
5
7
9
11

As of the 2027 election, there are currently 1,652 commune chiefs and 11,622 commune councilors respectively.

== Conduct of elections ==
=== Entitlement to candidacy ===
According to article 34 of the Constitution, Cambodian citizens regardless of gender, race and faith has the right to stand for elections, subject to conditions established by law. All elections in Cambodia are done so by a party list system, where voters vote for a party instead of a candidate, which means independent candidates cannot run for an election. Candidates are nominated through political parties and submitted to the NEC, as nomination by a registered political party is required for a candidacy to be validated.

Under Article 23 of the Law on the Election of Members of the National Assembly, to stand for an election for the National Assembly. A candidate must be a Khmer citizen by birth, be at least 25 years old on election day, be entitled to vote and have their name on the voter list, have residence or temporary residence in Cambodia, and be nominated by a registered political party participating in the election. Candidates however, are not required to reside in the province they are contesting in. To be able to run for the Senate, candidates must be at least 40 years old. Furthermore, to run in commune councils, candidates must be eligible to vote, be at least 25 years old on election day and reside in the commune they are running in.

According to the Cambodian election law, the National Election Committee with holds the right to disqualify or reject any candidacy deemed ineligible on the basis of election law. Individuals who are court officials, members of the National Police and Royal Cambodian Armed Forces, religious priests, convicted of felony or misdemeanor offenses and have not been rehabilitated, people deprived of electoral rights, had their voting rights stripped on the grounds of cognitive ability, members of the National Election Committee, members of the Supreme Council of the Magistracy, and members of the Constitutional Council, are not eligible to stand for elections. Furthermore, an amendment to the electoral law of Cambodia now states that if a candidate fails to produce evidence that they have voted in the 2 previous consecutive elections, they lose the right to candidacy in any public office.

== Latest elections ==
=== National Assembly ===

Party	Votes	%	Seats	+/–
Cambodian People's Party	6,398,311	82.30	120	–5
FUNCINPEC	716,490	9.22	5	+5
Khmer National United Party	134,285	1.73	0	0
Cambodian Youth Party	97,412	1.25	0	0
Dharmacracy Party	84,030	1.08	0	0
Cambodia Indigenous Peoples Democracy Party	52,817	0.68	0	0
Khmer Anti-Poverty Party	40,096	0.52	0	0
Khmer United Party	36,526	0.47	0	0
Grassroots Democratic Party	35,416	0.46	0	0
Khmer Economic Development Party	26,093	0.34	0	0
Ekpheap Cheat Khmer Party	25,261	0.32	0	New
Cambodian Nationality Party	23,197	0.30	0	0
Women for Women Party	22,843	0.29	0	New
Khmer Conservative Party	20,968	0.27	0	New
Beehive Social Democratic Party	20,210	0.26	0	0
People Purpose Party	13,831	0.18	0	New
Democracy Power Party	13,704	0.18	0	New
Farmer's Party	12,786	0.16	0	New
Total	7,774,276	100.00	125	0
Valid votes	7,774,276	94.64		
Invalid/blank votes	440,154	5.36		
Total votes	8,214,430	100.00		
Registered voters/turnout	9,710,655	84.59		
Source: National Election Committee

=== Results of seat allocation by provinces ===
Province	CPP	FUNCINPEC	Total
Banteay Meanchey	6	0	6
Battambang	8	0	8
Kampong Cham	9	1	10
Kampong Chhnang	4	0	4
Kampong Speu	6	0	6
Kampong Thom	5	1	6
Kampot	6	0	6
Kandal	10	1	11
Koh Kong	1	0	1
Kratié	3	0	3
Mondulkiri	1	0	1
Phnom Penh	11	1	12
Preah Vihear	1	0	1
Prey Veng	10	1	11
Pursat	4	0	4
Ratanakiri	1	0	1
Siem Reap	6	0	6
Preah Sihanouk	3	0	3
Stung Treng	1	0	1
Svay Rieng	5	0	5
Takéo	8	0	8
Oddar Meanchey	1	0	1
Kep	1	0	1
Pailin	1	0	1
Tboung Khmum	8	0	8
Total	120	5	125

=== Senate ===
Preliminary results released by the NEC showed that the CPP had won 55 of the 58 contested seats in the Senate, with the remaining four seats being filled by appointees of King Norodom Sihamoni and the National Assembly. The other three contested seats were won by the Khmer Will Party, a coalition of parties opposed to Hun Sen and a proxy of the Candlelight Party. It also showed that the opposition had lost ground in Phnom Penh to the CPP by nearly half of its votes and by 30 percent in the surrounding Kandal Province.

Party	Votes	%	Seats	+/–
Cambodian People's Party	10,052	85.92	55	-3
Khmer Will Party	1,394	11.92	3	New
Nation Power Party	234	2.00	0	New
FUNCINPEC	19	0.16	0	0
Members appointed by National Assembly			2	0
Members appointed by Monarch (Note: Two independents.)			2	0
Total	11,699	100.00	62	11730
Valid votes	11,699	99.74		
Invalid/blank votes	31	0.26		
Total votes	11,730	100.00		
Registered voters/turnout	11,747	99.86		
Source: KT, NEC, KT, VP, Xinhua

=== Results by region ===
Regions	CPP			KWP			FUNCINPEC			NPP			Blank/invalid	Total
Regions	Votes	%	Seats	Votes	%	Seats	Votes	%	Seats	Votes	%	Seats	Blank/invalid	Total
Region 1	817	90.18%	6	88	9.71%	0	1	0.11%	0	0	0.00%	0	7	
Region 2	1121	82.12%	7	239	17.51%	1	1	0.07%	0	4	0.29%	0	7	
Region 3	779	84.22%	5	130	14.05%	0	4	0.43%	0	12	1.30%	0	7	
Region 4	1191	77.95%	9	218	14.27%	1	1	0.07%	0	118	7.72%	0	7	
Region 5	1187	88.78%	7	148	11.07%	0	0	0.00%	0	2	0.15%	0	7	
Region 6	1161	82.28%	6	245	17.36%	1	1	0.07%	0	4	0.28%	0	7	
Region 7	1575	90.47%	9	151	8.67%	0	0	0.00%	0	15	0.86%	0	7	
Region 8	1501	84.99%	6	175	9.91%	0	11	0.62%	0	79	4.47%	0	7	
Total	10,117	86.99%	55	1,394	11.01%	3	19	0.15%	0	234	1.85%	0	7	11,730
Source: National Election Committee

=== Communal ===
Party	Votes	%	Swing	Chiefs	+/–	Councillors	+/–
Cambodian People's Party	5,378,773	74.32	23.5	1,648	492	9,376	2,873
Candlelight Party	1,610,556	22.25	22.2	4	4	2,198	2198
FUNCINPEC	91,798	1.27	0.63	0	0	19	9
Khmer National United Party	63,868	0.88	0.25	0	1	13	11
Cambodia National Love Party	33,259	0.46	0.46	0	0	5	5
Cambodian Youth Party	13,841	0.19	0.17	0	0	3	3
Cambodia Nationality Party	13,140	0.18	0.15	0	0	0	0
Khmer Will Party	7,556	0.10	0.10	0	0	0	0
Grassroots Democratic Party	6,807	0.09	0.02	0	0	6	1
Cambodia Reform Party	5,024	0.07	0.07	0	0	0	0
Kampucheaniyum Party	4,856	0.07	0.07	0	0	1	1
Beehive Social Democratic Party	2,460	0.03	0.42	0	0	1	0
Cambodia Indigenous People's Democracy Party	1,634	0.02	0	0	0	0	0
Khmer United Party	1,599	0.02	0.02	0	0	0	0
Ekpheap Cheat Khmer Party	1,126	0.02	0.02	0	0	0	0
Reaksmey Khemara Party	446	0.01	0.01	0	0	0	0
Khmer Economic Development Party	294	0.00	0.00	0	0	0	0
Total	7,237,037	100	100	1,652	6	11,622	50
Valid votes	7,237,037	97.87					
Invalid/blank votes	157,390	2.13					
Total votes	7,394,427	100					
Registered voters/turnout	9,205,681	80.3					
Source: National Election Committee

Province	CPP		CLP		FUNCINPEC	
Province	Votes	%	Votes	%	Votes	%
Banteay Meanchey	194,543	72.23%	55,900	20.75%	4,381	1.63%
Battambang	347,062	76.10%	94,744	20.77%	5,521	1.21%
Kampong Cham	339,279	70.09%	125,875	26.00%	4,836	1.00%
Kampong Chhnang	202,957	71.40%	66,991	23.57%	6,323	2.22%
Kampong Speu	384,954	78.13%	90,002	18.27%	6,946	1.21%
Kampong Thom	205,882	62.63%	94,323	28.69%	16,226	4.94%
Kampot	232,479	73.19%	75,999	23.93%	5,279	1.68%
Kandal	481,744	74.18%	154,371	23.77%	5,008	0.77%
Koh Kong	44,992	79.56%	10,356	18.31%	64	0.11%
Kratié	120,550	72.62%	35,216	21.22%	5,505	3.32%
Mondulkiri	29,676	82.33%	4,434	12.30%	281	0.78%
Phnom Penh	536,625	76.95%	151,262	21.69%	3,395	0.49%
Preah Vihear	84,791	73.68%	25,130	21.84%	1,763	1.53%
Prey Veng	398,045	71.35%	140,728	25.23%	3,783	0.68%
Pursat	195,656	85.26%	32,143	14.01%	605	0.26%
Ratanakiri	69,838	83.31%	11,735	14.00%	160	0.19%
Siem Reap	306,668	69.37%	115,589	26.15%	6,938	1.57%
Preah Sihanouk	86,308	80.10%	17,400	16.15%	1,857	1.72%
Stung Treng	55,898	77.98%	12,009	16.75%	2,663	3.71%
Svay Rieng	245,164	74.98%	75,528	23.10%	3,480	1.06%
Takéo	406,958	75.83%	118,061	22.00%	2,331	0.43%
Kep	19,284	84.86%	2,893	12.73%	442	1.95%
Pailin	25,458	81.79%	5,095	16.37%	0	0.00%
Oddar Meanchey	87,069	80.67%	16,353	15.15%	178	0.16%
Tboung Khmum	276,895	75.72%	78,419	21.44%	4,833	1.32%
Source: National Election Committee

== Historical elections ==
Election was conducted under the French protectorate

Election was conducted under the First Kingdom of Cambodia

Election was conducted under the Khmer Republic

Election was conducted under Democratic Kampuchea

Election was conducted under the People's Republic of Kampuchea

Election was conducted under the Second Kingdom of Cambodia

=== General elections ===
Year	Incumbent government		Results	
Year	Prime Minister	Party	Results	
1946	None	None	1 September 1946. Sisowath Youtevong elected Prime minister. Democratic gain.	▌ ✓ Sisowath Youtevong (Democratic) 50 seats; ▌ Norodom Norindeth (Liberal) 14 seats
1947	Sisowath Watchayavong	Democratic	21 December 1947. Chhean Vam elected Prime minister. Democratic hold.	▌ ✓ Sisowath Watchayavong (Democratic) 44 seats; ▌ Norodom Norindeth (Liberal) 21 seats
1951	Oum Chheang Sun	Democratic	9 September 1951. Huy Kanthoul elected Prime minister. Democratic hold.	▌ ✓ Huy Kanthoul (Democratic) 54 seats; ▌ Norodom Norindeth (Liberal) 18 seats; ▌ (Victorious North-East Party) 4 seats; ▌ (Khmer Renovation Party) 2 seats
1955	Huy Kanthoul	Democratic	9 June 1955. Norodom Sihanouk elected Prime minister. Sangkum gain.	▌ ✓ Norodom Sihanouk (Sangkum) 91 seats
1958	Norodom Sihanouk	Sangkum	23 March 1958. Norodom Sihanouk re-elected Prime minister. Sangkum hold.	▌ ✓ Norodom Sihanouk (Sangkum) 61 seats
1962	Norodom Sihanouk	Sangkum	10 June 1962. Norodom Kantol elected Prime minister. Sangkum hold.	▌ ✓ Norodom Sihanouk (Sangkum) 77 seats
1966	Norodom Kantol	Sangkum	11 September 1966. Lon Nol elected Prime minister. Sangkum hold.	▌ ✓ Norodom Sihanouk (Sangkum) 82 seats
1972	Sơn Ngọc Thành	KS	3 September 1972. Hang Thun Hak elected Prime minister. PRS gain.	▌ ✓ Lon Nol (PRS) 126 seats
1976	Long Boret	PRS	20 March 1976. Penn Nouth elected Prime minister. Communist gain.	▌ ✓ Pol Pot (Communist) 125 seats
1981	Pol Pot	Communist	1 May 1981. Pen Sovann elected Prime minister. KPRP gain.	▌ ✓ Pen Sovann (KPRP) 117 seats
1993	Hun Sen	KPRP	21 December 1947. Norodom Ranariddh elected 1st Prime minister. Hun Sen elected 2nd Prime minister. Hung parliament.	▌ ✓ Norodom Ranariddh (FUNCINPEC) 58 seats; ▌ Chea Sim (CPP) 51 seats; ▌ Son Sann (BLDP) 10 seats; ▌ Prum Neakaareach (MOULINAKA) 1 seats
1998	Ung Hout	FUNCINPEC	26 July 1998. Hun Sen re-elected Prime minister. CPP gain.	▌ ✓ Chea Sim (CPP) 64 seats; ▌ Norodom Ranariddh (FUNCINPEC) 43 seats; ▌ Sam Rainsy (SRP) 15 seats
1998	Hun Sen	CPP	26 July 1998. Hun Sen re-elected Prime minister. CPP gain.	▌ ✓ Chea Sim (CPP) 64 seats; ▌ Norodom Ranariddh (FUNCINPEC) 43 seats; ▌ Sam Rainsy (SRP) 15 seats
2003	Hun Sen	CPP	27 July 2003. Hun Sen re-elected Prime minister. CPP hold.	▌ ✓ Chea Sim (CPP) 73 seats; ▌ Norodom Ranariddh (FUNCINPEC) 26 seats; ▌ Sam Rainsy (SRP) 24 seats
2008	Hun Sen	CPP	27 July 2008. Hun Sen re-elected Prime minister. CPP hold.	▌ ✓ Chea Sim (CPP) 90 seats; ▌ Sam Rainsy (SRP) 26 seats; ▌ Kem Sokha (HRP) 6 seats; ▌ Norodom Ranariddh (NRP) 2 seats; ▌ Nhek Bun Chhay (FUNCINPEC) 2 seats
2013	Hun Sen	CPP	28 July 2013. Hun Sen re-elected Prime minister. CPP hold.	▌ ✓ Chea Sim (CPP) 68 seats; ▌ Sam Rainsy (CNRP) 55 seats
2018	Hun Sen	CPP	29 July 2018. Hun Sen re-elected Prime minister. CPP hold.	▌ ✓ Hun Sen (CPP) 125 seats
2023	Hun Manet	CPP	23 July 2023. Hun Manet elected Prime minister. CPP hold.	▌ ✓ Hun Sen (CPP) 120 seats; ▌ Norodom Chakravuth (FUNCINPEC) 5 seats

=== Head of State elections ===
Year	Incumbent		Results	
Year	Head of State	Party	Results	
1960	None	None	13 June 1960 or 14 June 1960. Norodom Sihanouk elected Chief of State. Sangkum gain.	▌ ✓ Norodom Sihanouk (Sangkum)
1970	Norodom Sihanouk	Sangkum	19 March 1970. Cheng Heng elected President. Independent gain.	▌ ✓ Cheng Heng (Ind.)
1972	Cheng Heng	Ind.	4 June 1972. Lon Nol elected President. PRS gain.	▌ ✓ Lon Nol (PRS) 54.93%; ▌ In Tam (Democratic) 24.45%; ▌ Keo An (Republican) 20.62%
1975	Sak Sutsakhan	Ind.	19 March 1970. Sak Sutsakhan elected President of the Supreme Committee. Independent gain.	▌ ✓ Sak Sutsakhan (Ind.)
1976	Sak Sutsakhan	Ind.	11-13 April 1976. Khieu Samphan elected State Presidium. Communist gain.	▌ ✓ Khieu Samphan (Communist)

== See also ==
- List of political parties in Cambodia
- Electoral calendar
- Electoral system
- Freedom of expression and assembly in Cambodia
- Internet censorship in Cambodia
