= Phnom Penh (National Assembly constituency) =

Cambodian constituency

- National Assembly constituency
- Province: Phnom Penh
- Population: 1,501,725
- Electorate: 866,347

Current constituency
- Created: 1993
- Seats: 12
- Members: Pa Socheatvong; Ith Sam Heng; Mam Bunheng; Ing Kuntha Phavi; Kep Chuktema; Hou Sry; Krouch Sam An; Lork Kheng; Ousman Hasan; Cheap Sivon; Pich Kimsreang; Ly Chheng

Phnom Penh (Khmer: មណ្ឌលរាជធានីភ្នំពេញ) is one of the 25 constituencies of the National Assembly of Cambodia. It is allocated 12 seats in the National Assembly. It is currently the largest constituency.

== MPs ==
Election	MP (Party)	MP (Party)	MP (Party)	MP (Party)	MP (Party)	MP (Party)	MP (Party)	MP (Party)	MP (Party)	MP (Party)	MP (Party)	MP (Party)
1993	Chea Sim (CPP)	Im Chhun Lim (CPP)	Thor Peng Leat (CPP)	Khieu Kanharith (CPP)	Norodom Ranariddh (FUNCINPEC)	Duong Khaem (FUNCINPEC)	Sam Kanitha (FUNCINPEC)	Amath Yashya (FUNCINPEC)	Oam Reach Sady (FUNCINPEC)	Sao Samuth (FUNCINPEC)	Ek Sereywath (FUNCINPEC)	Son Sann (BLDP)
1998	Keat Chhon (CPP)	Hou Sry (CPP)	Osman Hassan (CPP)	Um Nhanh (CPP)	Keo Remy (FUNCINPEC)	Sam Ramsek (FUNCINPEC)	So Chy (FUNCINPEC)	Tol Los (FUNCINPEC)	Moanh Siyon (Rainsy)	Sit Ibrahim (Rainsy)	Tioulong Saumura (Rainsy)	Yim Sovann (Rainsy)
2003	Chea Sim (CPP)	Sim Ka (CPP)	Keat Chhon (CPP)	Um Nhanh (CPP)	Norodom Vichara (FUNCINPEC)	Khy Taing Lim (FUNCINPEC)	Keo Remy (Rainsy)	Son Chhay (Rainsy)	Ho Vann (Rainsy)	Sok Soty (Rainsy)	Tioulong Saumura (Rainsy)	Yim Sovann (Rainsy)
2008	Hou Sry (CPP)	Krouch Sam An (CPP)	Keat Chhon (CPP)	Um Nhanh (CPP)	Lork Kheng (CPP)	Chiep Sivorn (CPP)	Chea Soth (CPP)	Son Chhay (Rainsy)	Ho Vann (Rainsy)	Ly Srey Vyna (Rainsy)	Tioulong Saumura (Rainsy)	Yim Sovann (Rainsy)
2013	Hou Sry (CPP)	Krouch Sam An (CPP)	Keat Chhon (CPP)	Kep Chuktema (CPP)	Lork Kheng (CPP)	Keo Sambath (Rainsy)	Dam Sith (Rainsy)	Son Chhay (Rainsy)	Ho Vann (Rainsy)	Ly Srey Vyna (Rainsy)	Tioulong Saumura (Rainsy)	Yim Sovann (Rainsy)
2018	Hou Sry (CPP)	Krouch Sam An (CPP)	Pa Socheatvong (CPP)	Kep Chuktema (CPP)	Lork Kheng (CPP)	Ith Sam Heng (CPP)	Mam Bunheng (CPP)	Ing Kuntha Phavi (CPP)	Kep Chuktema (CPP)	Pich Kimsreang (CPP)	Cheab Sivorn (CPP)	Osman Hassan (CPP)

== Election results ==
=== 2023 ===
Party	Leading Candidate	Popular Vote				Seats	
Party	Leading Candidate	Votes	Vote Change	%	Swing	Seats Won	Seat Change
Cambodian People's Party	Hun Manet	627,436	166,127	82.26%	4.48	11	1
FUNCINPEC	Norodom Chakravuth	90,996	60,256	11.93%	6.75	1	1
Khmer National United Party	Tip Teav	6,319	475	0.83%	0.16	0	Steady
Grassroots Democratic Party	Yeng Virak	5,527	7,936	0.72%	1.55	0	Steady
Cambodian Youth Party	Chean Kosal	5,417	3,136	0.71%	0.33	0	Steady
Dharmacracy Party	Tan Chanphal	4,652	2,270	0.61%	0.21	0	Steady
Cambodia Indigenous People's Democracy Party	Saroeun Noeun	3,046	1,947	0.40%	0.21	0	Steady
Khmer Anti-Poverty Party	Kong Saran	2,989	361	0.39%	0.17	0	Steady
Women for Women Party	Hak Sophea	2,832	New	0.37%	New	0	New
Beehive Social Democratic Party	Suon Chanthy	2,544	3,103	0.33%	0.62	0	Steady
Ekpheap Cheat Khmer Party	Touch Chamnan	2,540	New	0.33%	New	0	New
Khmer Economic Development Party	Chea Rithy	1,991	179	0.26%	0.05	0	Steady
Khmer Conservative Party	Real Camerin	1,658	New	0.22%	New	0	New
People Purpose Party	Ith Sarum	1,429	New	0.19%	New	0	New
Khmer United Party	Man Srey Noeun	1,092	1,902	0.14%	0.50	0	Steady
Farmer's Party	Chan Mithona	880	New	0.12%	New	0	New
Democracy Power Party	To Dani	745	New	0.10%	New	0	New
Cambodia Nationality Party	Hang Sopanha	678	1,788	0.09%	0.33	0	Steady
Total	762,771			100%		12	
Valid votes	762,771						
Invalid/blank votes	61,929						
Total votes	824,700						
Registered voters/turnout	961,742 (85.75%)						
Source: National Election Committee

=== 2018 ===
Party	Votes	%	Seats	+/–
Cambodian People's Party	461,309	77.78	12	+7
FUNCINPEC	30,740	5.18	0	0
League for Democracy Party	30,025	5.06	0	0
Khmer Will Party	14,772	2.49	0	New
Grassroots Democracy Party	13,463	2.27	0	New
Khmer Rise Party	8,540	1.44	0	New
Khmer National United Party	5,844	0.99	0	New
Beehive Social Democratic Party	5,647	0.95	0	New
Khmer Republican Party	3,689	0.62	0	New
Khmer Anti-Poverty Party	3,350	0.56	0	0
Khmer United Party	2,994	0.50	0	New
Cambodian Nationality Party	2,466	0.42	0	0
Dharmacracy Party	2,382	0.40	0	New
Cambodian Youth Party	2,281	0.38	0	New
Khmer Economic Development Party	1,812	0.31	0	0
Our Motherland Party	1,265	0.21	0	New
Cambodian Indigenous Democracy Party	1,099	0.19	0	New
Ponleu Thmey Party	896	0.15	0	New
Reaksmey Khemara Party	519	0.09	0	New
Invalid/blank votes	100,297	–	–	–
Total	693,390	100	12	0
Registered voters/turnout	866,347	80.04	–	–
Source: National Election Committee
