= 2027 Cambodian communal elections =

- 6 June 2027
- Communal chiefs
- All 1,652 Communal Chiefs
Party	Current chiefs
CPP	1,648
Candlelight	4
- Communal councillors
- All 11,622 seats on the Communal Councils
Party	Current seats
CPP	9,376
Candlelight	2,198
FUNCINPEC	19
KNUP	13
GDP	6
CNLP	5
CYP	3
KP	1
BSDP	1

Communal elections will be held in Cambodia on 6 June 2027, to elect 1,652 commune chiefs and commune councils. They will inturn, further elect senators, which are due in 2029. This will be the first election in Cambodia, after the border crisis with Thailand which further escalated into direct violence, and the change of prime ministers from Hun Sen to his son, Hun Manet. Where this election in itself is highly regarded as a referendum on the Manet's government and the handling of the border crisis with Thailand

== Electoral system ==
All 1,652 commune chiefs are elected by a simple plurality in a single round of voting, also known as first past the post. Where the party with the most votes wins, regardless of whether they achieve an absolute majority.

In addition to this, all 1,652 will elect a council for each respective commune. Under Sub-Decree 107, communes are limited to the following number of councillors per commune only, where the decision the size of the council is to be decided by "geographical and demographic factors" according to the National Election Committee (NEC). Where the council is elected using closed list proportional representation, under the d'Hondt method.

Number of possible seat allocations in commune councils
5
7
9
11

The total number of councillors and commune chiefs remains unchanged from the 2022 election, at 1,652 commune chiefs and 11,622 councillors respectively.

=== Changes to the Electoral System ===
The National Assembly approved a proposal aimed at amending how seats are allocated in commune councils, widely seen as a method to make obtaining council seats more challenging to opposition parties. Under the old systems, the 1st and 2nd deputy chief was automatically awarded to the second and third largest party by vote share. However, under the new system, if a party gains two-thirds of the votes, both deputy chiefs are automatically awarded to the respective party. This move was widely criticized by many political organizations such as the Alliance towards the Future as an attempt to limit opposition seats and political representation. Kan Savang, a representative of COMFREL, questioned whether the amendment was necessary and urged the government to "identify the underlying problem before changing the law". The Human Rights Watch further displayed critism of the new amendments, considering it as a mechanism for the consolidation of power towards the ruling Cambodian People's Party . The government however defend this move, saying the new system will allow for greater accuracy and representation in councils proportionate to election results.

== Background ==
After the 2022 communal elections, Cambodian People's Party (CPP) gained a landslide victory, with gains in both commune chiefs and commune councillors. However, the 2022 elections also saw a resurgence of the opposition, the Candlelight party. However, after the 2023 election, where the Candlelight party's candidacy was rejected by the NEC, which led to the formation of the Alliance Towards the Future, an alliance consisting of multiple opposition parties. This will be the first direct election, this alliance will face.

== Political parties ==
Parties		Leader	Seats	
Parties		Leader	Commune chiefs	Commune councilors
Cambodian People's Party		Hun Sen	1,648 / 1,652	9,376 / 11,622
Alliance Towards the Future	Candlelight Party	Teav Vannol	4 / 1,652	2,198 / 11,622
Alliance Towards the Future	Grassroots Democracy Party	Veng Virak	0 / 1,652	6 / 11,622
Alliance Towards the Future	Democratic Progressive Party (Note: Formerly Kampucheaniyum Party)	Yem Ponhearith	0 / 1,652	1 / 11,622
Alliance Towards the Future	Khmer Will Party	Kong Molika	0 / 1,652	0 / 11,622
Alliance Towards the Future	Cambodian Reform Party	Pol Ham	0 / 1,652	0 / 11,622
FUNCINPEC		Norodom Chakravuth	0 / 1,652	19 / 11,622
Khmer National United Party		Nhek Bun Chhay	0 / 1,652	13 / 11,622
Cambodian Youth Party		Pich Sros	0 / 1,652	3 / 11,622
Beehive Social Democratic Party		Mam Sonando	0 / 1,652	1 / 11,622
Nation Power Party		Chea Mony	Did not exist	Did not exist

== Conduct ==
Electoral Calendar
Event	Date
Registration of domestic election observers and journalists.	February 16 – May 27, 2027
Registration of international election observers and journalists.	February 16 – June 3, 2027
List of polling station locations released	March 3, 2027
Registration of party list candidates	March 5 – 7, 2027
Decision by the NEC on candidacy applications	March 14, 2027 (Last day)
Correction of applications for registration of candidate lists by the concerned political parties.	March 19, 2027 (Last day)
Examination and decision on the corrections to applications for registration of candidate lists by the NEC	March 20, 2027
Filing appeals regarding the registration of candidate lists	March 25, 2027 (Last day)
Resolution of appeals by the NEC	March 28, 2027 (Last day)
Filing appeals regarding the registration of candidate lists to the NEC	April 2, 2027 (Last day)
Resolution of appeals by the NEC	April 5, 2027 (Last day)
Posting the initial candidate lists at the NEC	April 7 – 9, 2027 (In case of appeals)
Filing objections against the initial candidate lists to the NEC	April 12, 2027 (Last day)
Resolution of objections against the initial candidate lists by the NEC	April 14, 2027 (Last day)
Posting the official candidate lists at the NEC	April 25, 2027 (Last day)
Registration of political party agents at the NEC	May 2, 2027 (Last day in case of appeals)
Distribution of Voter Information Notices in villages across Communes/Sangkats	April 15 – May 14, 2027
Application for and issuance of Identification Documents for Election Use (ID cards)	May 6 – June 4, 2027
Election campaign period	May 22 – June 4, 2027
Posting the voter lists and polling station codes at polling stations	June 5, 2027
Election day	June 6, 2027
Announcement of preliminary election results by the NEC	June 6 – 7, 2027
Verification of election results	June 7 – 9, 2027
Filing complaints/objections against the results.	June 12, 2027 (Last day)
Resolution of complaints/objections	June 17, 2027 (Last day)
Filing appeals against the NEC's decisions.	June 22, 2027 (Last day)
Resolution of appeals by the NEC	June 26, 2027 (Last day)
Announcement of official election results	June 27, 2027 (Last day)
Recall election held if needed.	July 26, 2027 (Last day)

=== Voter registration ===
A poster in Tboung Khmum publicised by the National Election Committee encouraging voter registration ahead of the 2027 communal election.

A banner by the National Election Committee announcing the commencement of the 2026 voter registration period

Voter registration for the 2027 communal elections happened nationwide from 7 October 2026 to 30 November 2026. Voters who recently became legal to vote or changed addresses must update their voter registration to be allowed to vote. During this period, the NEC will also remove individuals who are deceased or lost their right to vote from the electoral register. As a result of the border crisis with Thailand, people displaced from their homes are eligible to vote in communes where their temporary shelter is situated at.

Over, the push for citizens who haven't updated their biometric data to do has generated criticism. Where many citied that citizens can misunderstand the need to update their data, where the process make generate confusion to the public. In an audit by CONFREL, the agency found that in the 2025 voter list, there were 40 duplicated names and 18 potentially duplicated names on the electoral register. This electoral registration cycle has also regenerated the issue of the lack of services to allow Cambodian citizens overseas to vote in elections from outside the country.

== Campaign ==
According to party leader Hun Sen, the CPP plans to use the “peaceful resolution policy in the border dispute” as a campaign for the upcoming 2027 commune election and 2028 national election, further tapping into the message of peace and stability which was a core campaign point for the CPP in past elections. This was met with concern from the opposition, where Kong Monika, the leader of the Khmer Will Party, said "there should not be a monopoly on issues". Where he further cited, intimidation and restrictions remain the greatest challenge for opposition campaigns.

=== Allegations of Foreign Interference ===
The Sunday Guardian, an Indian news outlet, claims to uncover classified documents involving an alleged plan by the United States government, which proposed a program to strengthen the Cambodian opposition via a fund, worth 2 million dollars. According to the plan, the main beneficiary would have been the Alliance Towards the Future and several civil society organizations. The program also aimed at establishing opinion polls and further election monitoring. In response, the Ministry of the Interior issued a warning for all political parties that receiving foreign funding is illegal and may lead to dissolution. Furthermore, Kong Molika, the party leader of the Khmer Will Party, a member of the Alliance Towards the Future has rejected allegations of receiving foreign funding.
