= 2023 Cambodian general election =

- 23 July 2023
- All 125 seats in the National Assembly; 63 seats needed for a majority
- Turnout: 84.59% (▲1.57pp)
Party	Leader	Vote %	Seats	+/–
CPP	Hun Sen (Note: Hun Sen was the CPP's official prime ministerial candidate, but stepped down in favour of Hun Manet shortly after the election results were announced.)	82.30	120	−5
FUNCINPEC	Norodom Chakravuth	9.22	5	+5
This lists parties that won seats. See the complete results below.
Results by provinces
Prime Minister before	Prime Minister after
Hun Sen; CPP	Hun Manet; CPP

General elections were held in Cambodia on 23 July 2023 to elect members of the National Assembly. The Cambodian People's Party (CPP) held all seats in parliament prior to the elections.

The result was a landslide victory for the CPP, which won 120 of the 125 seats. FUNCINPEC won the remaining five seats, its best result since 2003.

On 26 July 2023 Prime Minister Hun Sen announced that he would be stepping down following the formation of a new government, with his son Hun Manet taking over. The new parliament's first sitting was scheduled for 21 August 2023 while the new cabinet would be sworn in one day later on 22 August. Hun Manet was formally nominated by the King on 7 August while he and his cabinet were subject to a vote of confidence from the National Assembly on 22 August.

== Background ==
Hun Sen had been Prime Minister of Cambodia and its predecessor states (the People's Republic of Kampuchea and the State of Cambodia) since January 1985 (in acting capacity from December 1984). Since the 1997 coup d'état, he has consolidated power, resulting in authoritarian rule and culminating in the establishment of a de facto one-party system in 2018 after the Supreme Court of Cambodia, which was loyal to him, banned the largest opposition party, the Cambodia National Rescue Party led by Sam Rainsy and Kem Sokha.

Hun Sen was endorsed as the CPP's prime ministerial candidate for the 2023 election during the party's 43rd Congress. The Central Committee also unanimously approved Hun Manet, Hun Sen's son, as the party's future prime ministerial candidate after Hun Sen. Hun Sen had publicly vowed to stay on until after the 2028 election, though a transition of power to his son between 2023 and 2028 was not entirely ruled out. Despite some shortcomings, particularly during the large-scale outbreak in early 2021, the government was widely praised for its COVID-19 response, which initiated a successful vaccination program, with over 80% of the population fully vaccinated as of January 2022.

The 2022 communal elections, which resulted in an expected landslide for the CPP, were seen as a bellwether for the general election. Based on those results, the CPP internally projected that it would win 104 seats or 83.20%, and the Candlelight Party would win 21 seats or 16.80%. However, afterwards the spokesperson for the CPP Sok Eysan said that the CPP would be targeting 90% of seats (120).

On 15 May 2023, the Candlelight Party's registration was officially denied by the National Election Committee, meaning that they were disqualified from participating in the election. The reason given was a failure to submit proper registration documents, which the party said it would appeal.

=== Political ban on Kem Sokha ===
On 3 March 2023, former Cambodia National Rescue Party president Kem Sokha was sentenced to 27 years in jail for allegedly conspiring with foreign powers to topple the government. The municipal court sentenced under Criminal Code sections 439 and 443, and excluded him from politics and elections under Article 450. Sokha was not immediately imprisoned, but was instead restricted to his house under court monitoring. The court verdict was condemned by human rights groups, the US embassy and UN Human Rights Commissioner.

== Resignations in opposition parties ==
=== Cambodian Youth Party ===
In February 2023, fifteen party members, including three senior members of the Cambodian Youth Party such as members of the standing committee Neou Bora, Huon Thearith, and its General Secretary Chhom Chanthorn, resigned. Party Leader Pich Sros was quoted saying, "The resignations of senior officials are not thing to worry about, and the party plans to register its participation and list of candidates with the NEC [for the 2023 election].

=== Candlelight Party ===
Kong Korm, a senior advisor to Cambodia's Candlelight Party, resigned after authorities announced plans to pursue a lawsuit against him for comments he made in January condemning the seizure of his property. He apologized to Hun Sen and the CPP for motivating the party to file a lawsuit against him and said his association with the Candlelight Party was a mistake.

=== Hun Sen government ===
==== Foreign policy ====
During the Russo-Ukrainian War, Hun Sen and the government kept a neutral stance, though establishing more ties with Ukraine, where Hun Sen and Foreign Minister Prak Sokhonn met with Ukrainian Foreign Minister Dmytro Kuleba and sent deminers to train Ukrainian soldiers, and where Ukraine also showed plans of opening an embassy in Phnom Penh. Both sides have praised the Cambodian Government of maintaining its neutrality on the conflict.

==== Dismissals ====
A royal decree signed by King Norodom Sihamoni removed Minister of Agriculture, Forestry and Fisheries Veng Sakhon from his position on 8 October 2022, with immediate effect. The decision was made at the request of Prime Minister Hun Sen. The government then designated Minister of Economy and Finance Aun Pornmonirath as acting minister of agriculture in addition to his current ministry and duties. Later, the National Assembly approved Dith Tina as the new Minister of Agriculture.

On 24 August 2022, the Governor of Takhmao City was sacked from his post and reassigned to work in the Kandal Provincial Administration due to his "inactiveness" in dealing with clean water for residents.

==== Pursat ====
On 21 November 2022, Khoy Rida was sworn into office as the provincial governor of Pursat by Interior Minister Sar Kheng, due to the last governor Cheav Tay having been transferred due to his deteriorating health.

== Mount Kulen gathering ==
Khem Veasna, president of the League for Democracy Party, issued an ultimatum to the huge gathering assembled at a farm house south of Kulen Mountain, who flocked to the home after hearing a "doomsday warning" from a local politician and believed the region to be a "safehaven". People have assembled at the location in response to a forecast made by a local politician that they need to do so in order to "survive a devastating flood in the country and world" (LDP). Authorities gave the ultimatum after observing the crowd grow from 15,000 to 20,000 people.

=== Governmental reaction ===
==== Provincial officials ====
Teng Channat, the head of the provincial police in Siem Reap, warned that if Khem Veasna doesn't help dissolve the group by 30 August as he promised, the government will file a lawsuit.

The District Governor of Banteay Srei District in Siem Reap Province, Khim Finan, reported that since Saturday, officials had insisted that the gathering disband. Have speaking with the press, he added, “We are waiting to see whether the groups will disband since I’ve noticed that more people are gathering in and around his farm and also along the road to Kulen Mountain rather than leaving, which is really upsetting to witness”.

Siem Reap Provincial Governor Tea Seiha visited Khem Veasna's farm and asked him to disband the crowd.

==== National officials ====
Hun Manith along with other officials also had gone down to the farm home where the event was taking place and requested Khem Veasna to disband the gatherings.

The property, which is roughly an hour's drive from Siem Reap, is being evacuated by army trucks and ambulances under orders from Prime Minister Hun Sen. According to Hun Sen, the authorities should make it simple for the people to leave the gathering and return home if they choose to do so. Hun Sen claimed that Khem Veasna, the League for Democracy Party's president who recently converted to religion and dubbed himself a Brahma, or celestial king, was pressuring him to use violence to disperse the rally and arrest him. “However, I advised the authorities not to fall into his trap; not to do anything. I will not use violence against him.” Hun Sen had also added, “Veasna cursed me harshly on Facebook, but I am not going to respond with anger. I'll find a peaceful solution for the sake of all people in the Kingdom, he is free to make any claim he wishes, his political career will be over once his supporters discover that he has been lying,” the Prime Minister added.

== Electoral system ==
The Constitution of Cambodia states the National Assembly are elected to 5-year terms from 25 multi-member constituencies based on the provinces by closed list proportional representation. Seats were allocated using the D'Hondt method and elections are to happen on the fourth Sunday of July.

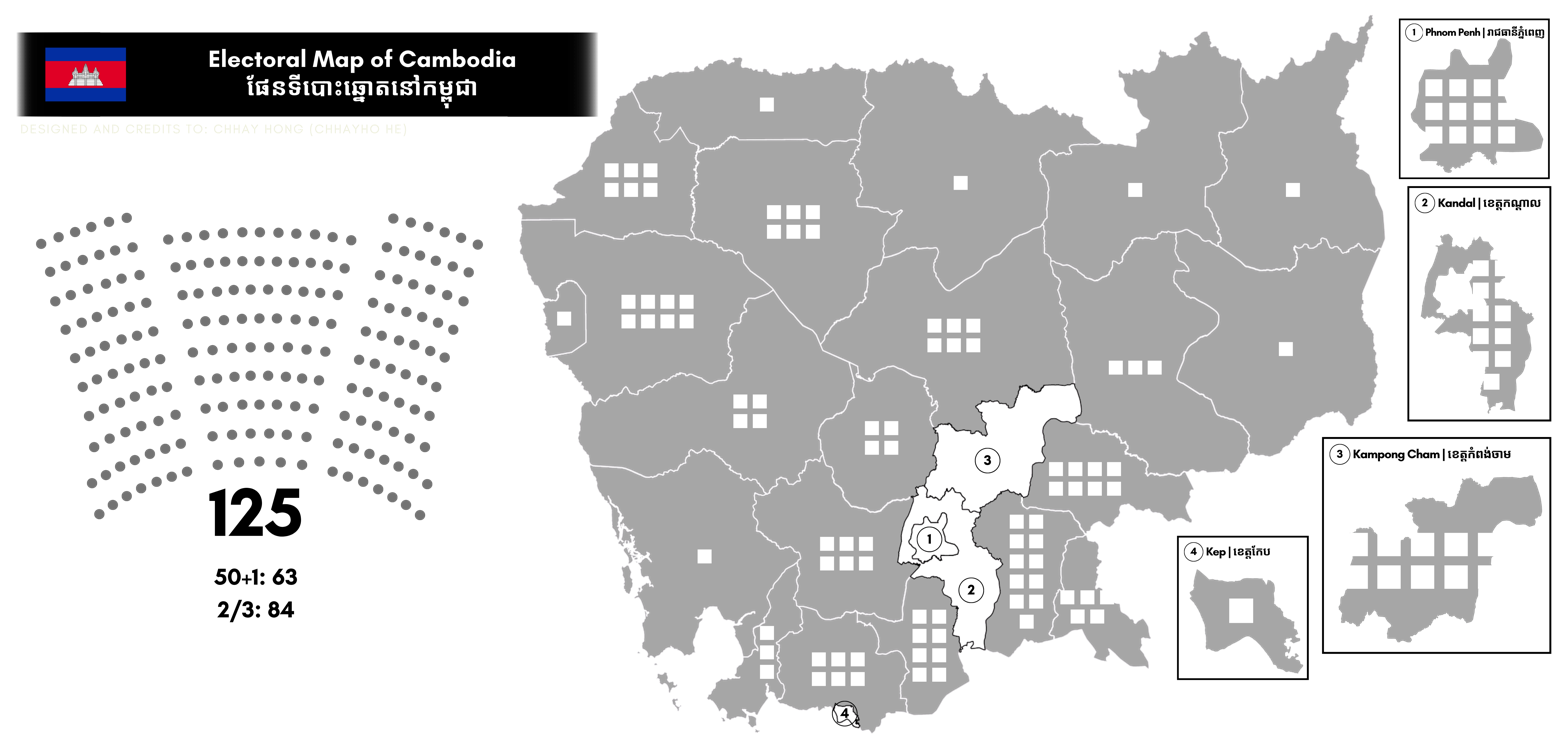
Map of the seat allocation by provinces

The number of seat allocation of provinces:

Province	Seats
Banteay Meanchey	6
Battambang	8
Kampong Cham	10
Kampong Chhnang	4
Kampong Speu	6
Kampong Thom	6
Kampot	6
Kandal	11
Koh Kong	1
Kratié	3
Mondulkiri	1
Phnom Penh	12
Preah Vihear	1
Prey Veng	11
Pursat	4
Ratanakiri	1
Siem Reap	6
Preah Sihanouk	3
Stung Treng	1
Svay Rieng	5
Takéo	9
Oddar Meanchey	1
Kep	1
Pailin	1
Tboung Khmum	8
Total	125

== Parliamentary Composition ==
↓
125
CPP

Party	Leader	National Assembly			Government
Party	Leader	2018 result		Current	Government
Party	Leader	%	Seats	Current	Government
Cambodian People's Party	Hun Sen	76.85%	125 / 125	120 / 125	Supermajority government

== Voters ==
All citizens aged 18 and older are eligible to vote. Voting is not mandatory. The NEC had fielded 9,710,645 registered voters for 2023, a rise of 504,964 more voters since the 2022 communal elections and a rise of 13.7% (1,330,428) since the 2018 general elections.

Demographics

Registered voters by gender
Gender	Number of people	%
Female	5,161,906	53.15%
Male	4,548,739	46.85%
Total	9,710,645	100%
Source: Khmer Times

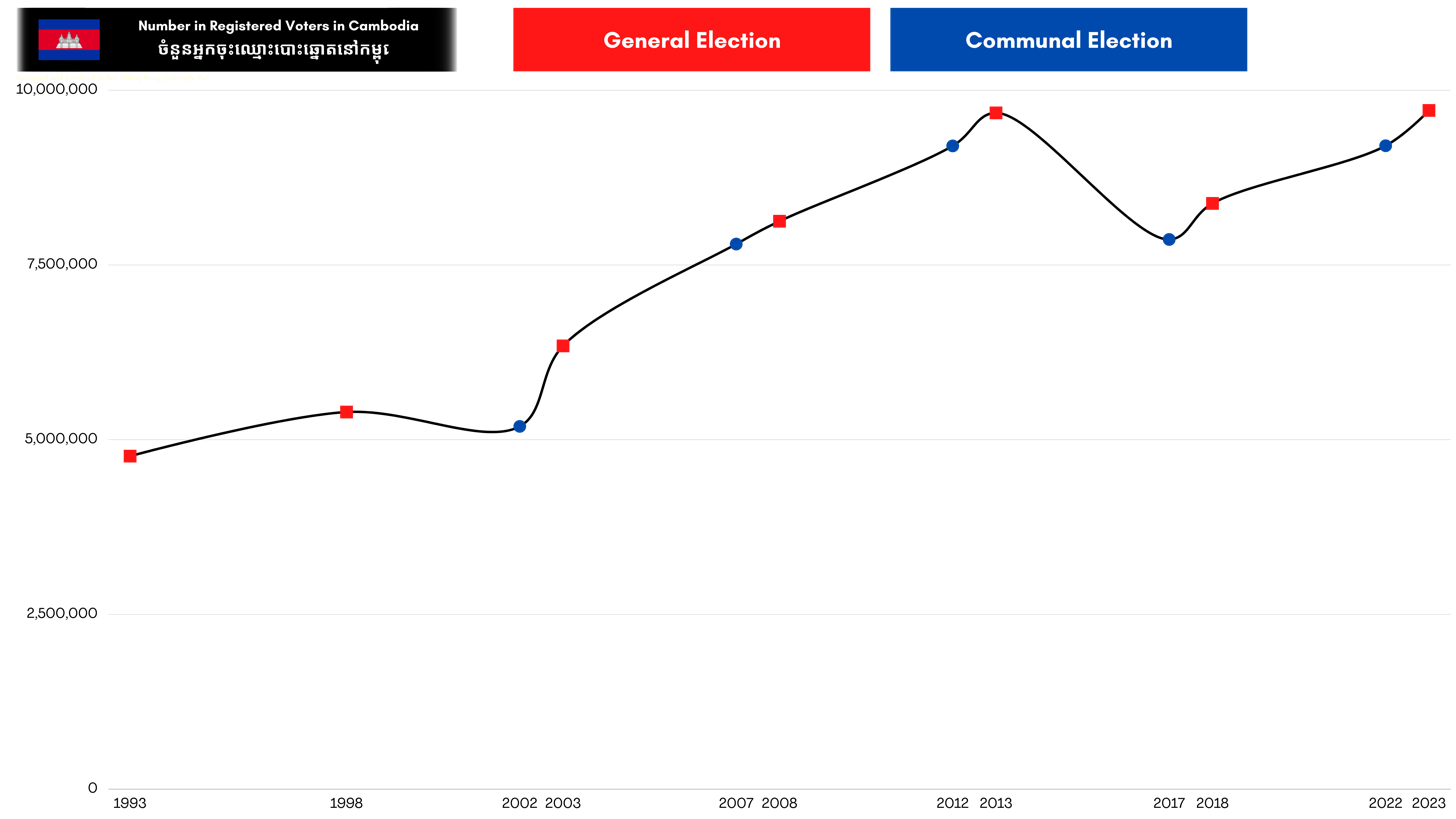
Growth trend of Cambodian registered voters

Growth trend of registered voters since 1993

Registered voters since 1993
Year	Number of people	+/-
1993	4,764,618	▲100%
1998	5,395,595	▲13.20%
2002	5,190,307	▼3.80%
2003	6,341,834	▲18.15%
2007	7,799,371	▲18.68%
2008	8,125,529	▲4.01%
2012	9,203,493	▲11.71%
2013	9,675,453	▲4.87%
2017	7,865,033	▼18.71%
2018	8,380,217	▲6.14%
2022	9,205,681	▲8.96%
2023	9,710,645	▲5.20%

== Election schedule ==
Date	Event
29 June 2022	Date of election announced
1 April–19 July 2023	Registration of national and international observers
24 April–8 May 2023	Nomination process
1–21 July 2023	Election campaign period
22 July 2023	Election silence
23 July 2023	Election day
23–24 July 2023	Preliminary results released
4 August 2023	Official results released
21 August 2023	Parliament inaugurated
22 August 2023	New cabinet sworn in
Source: Khmer Times

== Contesting Parties ==
The National Election Committee scheduled 24 April to 8 May as the deadline for political parties to register and submit candidate lists for the National Election. The NEC stated that this application form would be offered free of charge to political parties interested in participating in the election and submitting a list of candidates. The forms had to have been signed by the political party's leader or a representative who had received written authorization from the party leader.

=== Approved Parties ===
Ballot Number	Party	Party Leader	Constituencies Contested	Seats Contested	Ref.
1	Beehive Social Democratic Party	Mam Sonando	6 / 25	57 / 125	
2	Khmer United Party	Kuch Ly	25 / 25	125 / 125	
3	Cambodian Nationality Party	Seng Sokheng	25 / 25	125 / 125	
4	Khmer National United Party	Nhek Bun Chhay	25 / 25	125 / 125	
5	Democracy Power Party	Un Visethkun	12 / 25	66 / 125	
6	Farmer's Party	Meas Bovov	8 / 25	46 / 125	
7	Women for Women Party	Soeng Sothy	18 / 25	68 / 125	
8	Khmer Anti-Poverty Party	Daran Kravanh	25 / 25	125 / 125	
9	FUNCINPEC	Norodom Chakravuth	25 / 25	125 / 125	
10	Dharmacracy Party	Pothidey Savadey	25 / 25	125 / 125	
11	Grassroots Democratic Party	Yeng Virak	12 / 25	83 / 125	
12	People Purpose Party	Ith Sarum	9 / 25	45 / 125	
13	Khmer Economic Development Party	Hout Rathea	7 / 25	58 / 125	
14	Ekpheap Cheat Khmer Party	Un Chim	7 / 25	47 / 125	
15	Khmer Conservative Party	Real Camerin	7 / 25	49 / 125	
16	Cambodian Youth Party	Pich Sors	25 / 25	125 / 125	
17	Cambodia Indigenous Peoples Democracy Party	Blang Sin	22 / 25	95 / 125	
18	Cambodian People's Party	Hun Sen	25 / 25	125 / 125	

=== Disqualified parties ===
The National Election Committee (NEC) declined to recognize the main opposition Candlelight Party and Khmer United Great Nation Party for the July general election because it did not meet all of the election law's requirements. This decision was later backed by the Constitutional Council.

Party	Party Leader	Constituencies to be Contested	Seats to be Contested	Ref.
Candlelight Party	Teav Vannol	25 / 25	125 / 125	
Khmer United Great Nation Party	Heang Kemsroeun	7 / 25	46 / 125	

== Campaign ==
=== Electoral debates ===
Date	Organisers	Moderator(s)	P Present S Surrogate NI Not invited I Invited A Absent																		
Date	Organisers	Moderator(s)	CPP	FUNCINPEC	KNUP	CYP	DP	CIPDP	KPP	GDP	KEDP	KUP	ECP	CNP	WFW	KCP	BSDP	PPP	DPP	FP	Ref.
4 July	Khmer Times	Taing Rinith	PEysan	NI	NI	NI	NI	NI	NI	PVirak	NI	NI	NI	NI	NI	A	NI	NI	NI	NI	
7 July	Khmer Times	Morn Vanntey	NI	PVorn	NI	NI	NI	NI	NI	NI	PChanthon	NI	NI	NI	NI	A	NI	NI	NI	NI	
7 July	Khmer Times	Morn Vanntey	NI	NI	NI	PSros	NI	NI	NI	NI	NI	NI	NI	NI	PSothy	A	NI	NI	NI	NI	
10 July	Khmer Times	Taing Rinith	NI	NI	NI	NI	NI	NI	NI	NI	NI	NI	NI	NI	NI	A	PSonando	NI	PVisethkun	NI	
10 July	Khmer Times	Morn Vanntey	NI	NI	NI	NI	NI	NI	NI	NI	NI	PLy	NI	NI	NI	A	NI	NI	NI	PBopov	
11 July	Khmer Times	Morn Vanntey	NI	NI	PPonhearith	NI	PSavadey	NI	NI	NI	NI	NI	NI	NI	NI	A	NI	NI	NI	NI	
13 July	Khmer Times	Taing Rinith	NI	NI	NI	NI	NI	NI	NI	NI	NI	NI	PChim	PSokheng	NI	A	NI	NI	NI	NI	
17 July	Khmer Times	Morn Vanntey	NI	NI	NI	NI	NI	PPany	PKravanh	NI	NI	NI	NI	NI	NI	A	NI	PSarum	NI	NI	
20 July	Khmer Times	Taing Rinith	PYara	NI	NI	NI	NI	NI	NI	NI	NI	NI	NI	NI	NI	A	NI	NI	NI	NI	

=== Party Policy ===
The National Election Committee published all policies of the parties running in the elections to their website.

Beehive Social Democratic Party
1. Improving the democratic practice by creating a separation of powers between the legislature, the executive and the judiciary.

2. Reform the judiciary to be independent: The election of the president of each provincial court through a general election by the people every two years.

3. Transparency and social justice: Tighten control and strengthen tax collection. All state tenders must be made public and broadcast live on national television. Avoid officials of the relevant ministries who have disputes with the people to participate in the dispute resolution committee.

4. Social Security - Global expansion of health insurance to workers in all sectors. Set the minimum wage for all sectors of work. - Continue to provide cash to the poor and vulnerable. The state is responsible for the medical needs of the elderly, the disabled, lonely women, pregnant women and orphans.

5. Health sector: Reduce the distance from people's places of residence to health centers and waiting areas. - Increase at least 1,000 health workers per year

6. Agriculture and food security: Land reform by clearly defining the area for cultivation and residential land. Establish a multi-sector model farm managed by the Ministry of Agriculture and remote rural community farms.

7. Fisheries and forestry: Eliminate all floating villages and communes. Increase the aggravated punishment for fisheries crimes and crimes equivalent to a drug offense.

8. Industrial sector: Facilitate multidisciplinary investment on the manufacturing industry.

9. Education: Extra hours in math and foreign language lessons. Reform the direction of study towards digital sector and advanced technology.

10. Foreign policy and international cooperation: Respect the content and spirit of Article 1 of the State Law Charter. Respect and abide by all international treaties to which Cambodia is a signatory.

11. National Defense: Determine the form of the Royal Cambodian Armed Forces as an active professional army, assisted by soldiers. Transform military theory from traditional warfare to modern army using advanced technology. Strengthen politics, modernization programs, military equipment.
Cambodian People's Party
1. Maintain peace, security, order and social security to ensure the security of the people and the development of the nation.

2. Provide public services to the people with transparency, convenience and confidence, continue to apply for free service, birth registration, marriage, death list, provision of residence book, family book and Khmer identity card.

3. Continue to not pay family tax. Farmland helps farmers expand production and find markets to sell agricultural products at affordable prices, allocate and provide land ownership to poor landless families who have complied with social land concession conditions, prevent encroachment on all types of state land and continue to provide land to people And obtain the location of state land in accordance with the principles set by the state.

4. Continue to implement the principle of eliminating taxes and fees for the sale of baskets in various markets throughout the country, traders in the state market and Mean Chey market occupy, use and enjoy. Stalls will have the right to transfer these rights to children or others, continue to reduce the cost of living of citizens through mechanisms to maintain Stable. Food and water bills will be reduced for the general population.

5. Promote the implementation of the policy of safe villages, communes, continue to develop all communes / sangkats to have better communication through regular road maintenance, construction of new roads and improvement from dirt roads to paved roads. Asphalt or concrete roads, adequate electricity and water, better quality irrigation and telecommunication services.

6. Continue to increase the salaries of all types of civil servants and the Armed Forces, continue to adjust and increase the pensions of former civil servants and veterans, continue to increase the minimum wage of workers and keep other benefits for workers, continue to apply the principle of no tax on Minimum wage of all types of civil servants and minimum wage of workers Promote the protection of workers' rights and interests, both systemic and informal, continue to implement cash subsidies for poor and vulnerable families. . In the fight against Kovid-19 and continue to help pregnant women and children under 2 years of age from poor families and support programs for pregnant women and children under 2 years.

7. Promote the provision of quality, safe, effective and equitable health care services to the people. Continue toprovide primary health care services at health centers and prevent, diagnose, treat, care and rehabilitate at public hospitals throughout the country free of charge. Services for the poor. And Vulnerable through the Health Equity Fund program, expand primary schools to all villages, expand secondary schools to all communes, and establish high schools in districts. Youth have the opportunity to study, train and have jobs.

8. Strengthen the management of foreign immigrants in accordance with the law in force, promote the work to prevent and suppress the theft and illegal activities of foreigners entering Cambodia.
People Purpose Party
1. Build a homeland where the people have ownership, live with dignity, adhere to our spirit of participation for our nation.

2. Promote the right to own the country of all Cambodians to become a potential for building a nation of freedom, justice, peace and national prosperity.

3. Adhere to the principles of democracy, implement the system of collective work, achieve responsible individuals, implement and ensure the livelihood of all citizens, prosper in dignity, friendship, brotherhood and loyalty, which ensures equality with the countries of the world.

4. Building Cambodian society promotes comprehensive knowledge development programs for the general population, especially in the field of technology and social welfare without discrimination.

5. Cultivate the mindset of every citizen based on activities in the spirit of responsibility for ourselves and in the mindset of our motherland, everything for our nation. This mindset will be incorporated into the education curriculum from primary to higher education.

6. Encourage young intellectuals at home and abroad to participate in the development of the country fairly and without discrimination.

7. Maintain and maintain good relations with countries and nations in the world on the principle of equality and mutual respect.

8. Cooperate with other parties in the spirit of common national interest and non-discrimination from different political and religious perspectives.

9. Train human resources and develop the country according to the lessons of the Samma Samputa: Mediation, middle path, minimum, non-negligence, omnipotence, elimination, all evil, merit, merit, fulfillment of all goodness and purity, purify the heart. Awake.
Women for Women Party
1. Protect and promote women first.

2. Defend the former Prime Minister and do not review the old structure of the Prime Minister.

3. Preserve the structure of the old government and make additional adjustments at shortcomings.

4. Help feed the elderly and orphans across the country by providing adequate accommodation and food.

5. Reduce alcohol and advertising that harm the health of the public.

6. Eliminate drugs and eradicate corruption.

7. Enabling prisoners to live equally as human beings.

8. Debt Relief for the Poor Elderly.

9. Establish local agricultural, handicraft and industrial markets and have free caregivers and doctors. (One Village, One Market Policy)

10. Eliminate Community Gambling.

11. Unite the Cambodian nation around the world to help the Cambodian economy.

== Conduct ==
The NEC set an application deadline for registration as an international observer which started on 1 April 2023, and ended on 19 July 2023. Afterwards 333 foreign observers and dignitaries from 65 countries and international institutions are confirmed to be acting as international observers. Malaysian Speaker of Parliament Johari Abdul and Guinea-Bissau's prime minister Nuno Gomes Nabiam and former Nigerian president Dr. Goodluck Jonathan and the Francophonie Election Observation Mission (MEF) and La Francophonie (OIF) are among some of the notable observers. Som Soreida, Deputy Secretary General and Spokesperson of the NEC, also disclosed that a total of more than 88,000 national observers from 121 institutions will participate in monitoring the election and counting of the ballots in the process of the election and out of more than 88,000 observers, 15 were from ASEAN countries, including 2 East Timor, 1 Singapore, 2 Myanmar, 5 Vietnam, 1 Indonesia and four other ASEAN member countries. NEC has invited, seven people from three countries, including France, Japan, and Russia to observe the election.

=== Incidents ===
- A man at Polling Station 0079, Wat Mohamandrey Primary School, in Sangkat Olympic, Khan Boeung Keng Kang, Phnom Penh was arrested by the Police in collaboration with NEC officials when he went to the polling station and did not place his ballot in the ballot box, instead holding the ballot and walking out.
- A man was arrested at polling station No. 303, Kbal Sneng Primary School, Choam Kravien Commune, Memot District, Tbong Khmum Province. According to the Tbong Khmum provincial police, the man, identified as Kly Pheak, came to vote, but refused to put his hand in the ink can. Following his arrest, police discovered narcotics in the suspect's urine.
- A man was arrested after being detected to spoiling his ballot yesterday and taking a picture of it, this took place in polling station 0804 in Stung Meanchey II at 9:30 am. The head of the polling office became suspicious and asked to check the man's mobile phone, he then detained the suspect after seeing a picture of the spoilt ballot on the man's phone. The person has been identified as Sat Oun, a male 35-year-old.

== Voter turnout ==
The voter turnout was reportedly 84.59%, which was an increase of 1.57pp from the 2018 election's reported 83.02% and the 2022 Communal election's reported turnout of 80.3%.The provinces with the lowest voter turnout for the election were Banteay Meanchey, Battambang, and Oddar Meanchey. The NEC reported that Banteay Meanchey with 431,775 voters had only 312,313 or 72.33% turned out rate. Oddar Meachey had 151,168 registered voters but only 115,413 people voted. The third province that saw low voter turnout was Battambang which had 661,970 registered voters but only 515,454 voters voting on Election Day. Problems such as heavy rains and strong winds in the afternoon was said to be the reason which prevented officials and people from coming to polling stations and the bad weather cut polling stations off from the internet and caused electricity outages. Other reasons such as migrant workers unable to get time off to vote and health issues were also cited as some of the reasons for a low turnout.

Region	Time			
Region	9:50	11:40	13:02	15:00
Nationwide	33.13%	64.12%	74.02%	78.28%

== Results ==

Party	Votes	%	Seats	+/–
Cambodian People's Party	6,398,311	82.30	120	–5
FUNCINPEC	716,490	9.22	5	+5
Khmer National United Party	134,285	1.73	0	0
Cambodian Youth Party	97,412	1.25	0	0
Dharmacracy Party	84,030	1.08	0	0
Cambodia Indigenous Peoples Democracy Party	52,817	0.68	0	0
Khmer Anti-Poverty Party	40,096	0.52	0	0
Khmer United Party	36,526	0.47	0	0
Grassroots Democratic Party	35,416	0.46	0	0
Khmer Economic Development Party	26,093	0.34	0	0
Ekpheap Cheat Khmer Party	25,261	0.32	0	New
Cambodian Nationality Party	23,197	0.30	0	0
Women for Women Party	22,843	0.29	0	New
Khmer Conservative Party	20,968	0.27	0	New
Beehive Social Democratic Party	20,210	0.26	0	0
People Purpose Party	13,831	0.18	0	New
Democracy Power Party	13,704	0.18	0	New
Farmer's Party	12,786	0.16	0	New
Total	7,774,276	100.00	125	0
Valid votes	7,774,276	94.64		
Invalid/blank votes	440,154	5.36		
Total votes	8,214,430	100.00		
Registered voters/turnout	9,710,655	84.59		
Source: National Election Committee

=== Results of seat allocation by provinces ===
Province	CPP	FUNCINPEC	Total
Banteay Meanchey	6	0	6
Battambang	8	0	8
Kampong Cham	9	1	10
Kampong Chhnang	4	0	4
Kampong Speu	6	0	6
Kampong Thom	5	1	6
Kampot	6	0	6
Kandal	10	1	11
Koh Kong	1	0	1
Kratié	3	0	3
Mondulkiri	1	0	1
Phnom Penh	11	1	12
Preah Vihear	1	0	1
Prey Veng	10	1	11
Pursat	4	0	4
Ratanakiri	1	0	1
Siem Reap	6	0	6
Preah Sihanouk	3	0	3
Stung Treng	1	0	1
Svay Rieng	5	0	5
Takéo	8	0	8
Oddar Meanchey	1	0	1
Kep	1	0	1
Pailin	1	0	1
Tboung Khmum	8	0	8
Total	120	5	125

== Reactions ==
=== Domestic ===
==== Khmer National United Party ====
Yem Ponhearith, the deputy leader of the party said in a statement on Facebook, "According to the preliminary results of the 7th National Assembly election in 2023 announced by the NEC, the Khmer National United Party has not yet received enough votes to win a seat in the National Assembly. Thank you to all Cambodians who went to the polls on July 23, 2023 in large numbers. The Khmer National United Party will continue to strive in the political sphere for the cause of Cambodia and its people first and foremost."

Nhek Bun Chhay, the party leader said on a post in Facebook, "I, Nhek Bun Chhay, President of the Khmer United National Party and a representative of all party leaders, would like to express my deepest gratitude to all the people who have given their trust in voting in support of the Khmer United National Party as well as the people. All who were invited to go to the polls for the 7th National Assembly election in 2023 in large numbers on July 23, 2023. We would like to bless all our compatriots to experience only the four blessings of the Buddha: age, class, happiness and strength, do not forget. In particular, I wish you good health, safety, happiness, successful business, and freedom for all families."

==== FUNCINPEC ====
Norodom Chakravuth, the leader of the party, said in a statement, "I am very excited and thank you for the sincere support from elders, parents, siblings and members of FUNCINPEC who went to the polls on July 23, 2023, to vote for FUNCINPEC."

==== Cambodian People's Party ====
Hun Manet, who was named the future prime ministerial candidate of the party, said in a statement, "[The] Cambodian people have clearly expressed their will through votes, with a very high turnout rate (more than 84%) and an overwhelming number has expressed support for the Cambodian People's Party. I have only two words for the people of Cambodia: 1) THANKS — for choosing to vote, and especially for all the love and confidence in CPP, and 2) COMMITMENT — to continue to serve Cambodia and Cambodian people better and better in the future."

Sok Eysan, the party's spokesperson, said to the Associated Press: "I have no results about the allocation of seats as of now but I can say that the ruling Cambodian People's Party has won a landslide victory."

==== Cambodian Youth Party ====
The leader of the Cambodian Youth Party, Pich Sros, stated on 25 July that he was satisfied with the election results and that, despite his party's failure to win a seat in the National Assembly. He was happy with the additional support the party had received.

==== Khmer United Party ====
In a statement the Khmer United Party endorsed the election outcomes. They noted that the election campaign period went off without a hitch, in conformity with the 1993 Constitution, and that it was free, impartial, and violent-free. "We support the outcomes of the parliamentary elections in 2023. All agree that the NEC-conducted election was free, fair, and in line with liberal democratic and pluralist values.

==== Ekpheap Cheat Khmer Party ====
The party in a statement, acknowledged the election results as well as also praising the "fairness, neutrality, and alignment" with the ideals of liberal democracy and pluralism in the election.

==== Gassroots Democratic Party ====
Yeng Virak said in a statement, “Honouring the initial results, I respect the verdict of the voters. The GDP came into being to embody the choice of the people, as this is the sole route for us to address issues and re-establish democratic procedures in Cambodia.”

=== International ===
- Australia – The Australian Embassy in Cambodia, said in a Facebook post, "Australia holds serious concerns about the environment in which Cambodia’s national elections took place and about Cambodia’s democratic trajectory. The lead-up to the July 23 poll saw the disqualification of the main opposition party and further pressure on independent media and civil society. This undermined the ability of all Cambodians to be informed, to express their views freely and to have a genuine choice in how they are governed."
- Canada – The Canadian embassy to Cambodia, said in a statement posted on Facebook, "With the continued intimidation of opposition parties, the Cambodian election campaign was not free or fair and voters did not have a real choice on July 23. We remain very concerned about the actions taken by Cambodian authorities with respect to elections."
- China – Chinese president Xi Jinping and Chinese premier Li Qiang both congratulated Hun Sen on his election victory, and further stated Hun Sen had achieved political, economic stability, standard of living development and a good reputation both internationally and regionally and further wishes to be work together.
- Cyprus – Martha A. Mavrommatis, The Ambassador of the Cyprus to Cambodia, congratulated the success of the free and fair election process of the 7th National Assembly Election. When she met with Senior Minister Ly Thuch, First Deputy Chairman of the Mine Authority on 28 July 2023.
- European Union – The elections were conducted in a restricted political and civic space, where the opposition, civil society and the media were unable to function effectively without hindrance, they also expressed regret of criminal convictions of political leaders and the disqualification of the main opposition party, the Candlelight Party. In a statement the EU also said, "The European Union is concerned by the amendments to the electoral law adopted a few weeks before the vote, which restrict the right to freedom of speech and the right of all citizens to stand for election, and calls for the release of detained members of the opposition."
- France – In a statement by the Spokesperson of the Ministry for Europe and Foreign Affairs of France, expressed regret that these elections took place in the absence of the main opposition party, the Candlelight Party, they also said in the statement on Facebook, "We call for the release of members of the opposition in detention and urge the Cambodian authorities to respect, in accordance with the provisions of the Paris Agreements of 1991 and the Cambodian Constitution, the fundamental rights necessary for the restoration of democracy."
- Germany – A Federal Foreign Office Spokesperson of Germany, said in a statement,"We take note of the results of the elections in Cambodia on July 23. These elections took place in a restrictive political environment", an expression of regret of the largest opposition party not allowed to register for the elections and the verdict against Kem Sokha and the closure of the media outlet “Voice of Democracy” as also mentioned in the statement.
- Guinea-Bissau – The Prime Minister of Guinea-Bissau Nuno Gomes Nabiam, who had also visited Cambodia to observe the election, expressed joy over the election conduct running smoothly and how people participated in the polls freely without any coercion.
- Laos – Thongloun Sisoulith, President of the Laos, sent a letter expressing his great pleasure and extending his sincere congratulations and best wishes to Hun Sen.
- Malaysia – Tan Sri Johari bin Abdul, Speaker of the Dewan Rakyat of Malaysia, who was an international observer to the National Election in Cambodia. He stated in an interview that the election was, "Very fair, very clean, and very well organised", he also expressed his admiration over the way Cambodia handled the election.
- Nigeria – Former Nigerian president Dr. Goodluck Jonathan, who was an international observer in the election said in a press conference, "We are all happy to be here today and we will be glad to witness the good people of this great country exercise this democratic right on Sunday, to elect the leaders of their choice for the next governance cycle in Cambodia."
- Russia – Delegates of the Russian's Central Election Commission and the Civic Chamber, who participated as international observers, expressed the intention to further tighten its relationship with Cambodia.
- Singapore – Prime minister Lee Hsien Loong congratulated the CPP on their victory and paid tribute to the outgoing prime minister, Hun Sen. Lee also extended congratulations to the newly appointed prime minister Hun Manet and said he was looking forward to meeting him in person at the next ASEAN Summit in Jakarta.
- Thailand – Wan Muhammad-Noor Matha, President of the Thai National Assembly, congratulated the CPP on its landslide victory in the National Election.
- United Kingdom – The British Embassy said in a statement, "Democratic elections depend on credible, open, and fair competition. We regret that these elections were preceded by a narrowing of the political space, including the disqualification of the main opposition Candlelight Party earlier this year, resulting in an election that was neither free nor fair. The UK views this as a missed opportunity to strengthen Cambodia’s democracy."
- United States – The United States Department of State said in a press statement that it was "troubled that the July 23 Cambodian national elections were neither free nor fair." It also said that visa restrictions and sanctions were imposed on those who "undermined democracy", and some foreign assistance programs were paused.
- Vietnam – The General Secretary of the Communist Party of Vietnam, Nguyễn Phú Trọng and the Prime Minister Phạm Minh Chính, both congratulated Hun Sen for his election win and expressed to further work with the newly elected Government. The Chairman of the Vietnamese National Assembly, Vương Đình Huệ extended his congratulations to Heng Samrin, other politicians including Lê Hoài Trung and Minister of Foreign Affairs Bùi Thanh Sơn who sent congratulations to Prak Sokhonn.

== Aftermath ==
After the election, Grassroots Democratic Party president Yeng Virak expressed his intention to quit the party and politics. He stated that despite the challenges, he had never aspired to any position in the government and had worked with a clean conscience to retain his values and improve his stance, he also further stated his disappointment over the party's inability to collect enough votes in the National Election to secure a seat.

Nhek Bun Chhay, president of the Khmer National United Party stated he would resign as party leader and retire if the party failed to win any seats in the election. On 2 August, the Khmer United National Party chaired a special meeting with the Chairman of the Provincial Local Strengthening Working Group, the Provincial Executive Chairman, the President of the Women and Youth Movement at the party's headquarters. At the meeting, the national and sub-national leaders unanimously asked President Nhek Bun Chhay to continue to lead the Khmer United National Party.

=== Analysis ===
This election was described by many media outlets as a dictator aiming to extend his iron fist rule by holding another carefully controlled election with no genuine competition as he prepares for his son's prospective power ascension.

After preliminary results started being announced, reports that the FUNCINPEC won five seats, after which Nhoeun Raden the spokesperson for FUNCINPEC claimed that his party had secured five seats, but the party is still waiting for confirmation from the NEC. Five seats were won by candidates from Phnom Penh and four additional provinces: Kandal, Kampong Cham, Kampong Thom, and Prey Veng. This was seen by many as an upturn and FUNCINPEC was seen as a surprise winner. There were allegations of seat sharing and seat adjustments with the ruling CPP that according to some gave Funcinpec the unexpected victory. Which were both dismissed by FUNCINPEC and CPP.

=== Government formation ===
Government Formation Schedule
Date	Event
7 August 2023	Prime Minister to be appointed by the King
21 August 2023	First session of the National Assembly
22 August 2023	Vote for no confidence on the new Government
22 August 2023	Government is Officially sworn in

On 26 July, Hun Sen announced on live television his resignation from the position of prime minister in a special message to the nation. The Prime Minister also stated that he will step down as prime minister on 22 August 2023. The Prime Minister noted that his resignation is a step toward long-term stability, which serves as the cornerstone for progress. Hun Sen stated that he will not interfere with Hun Manet's job as prime minister and that Hun Manet's inauguration as prime minister does not require any foreign help, simply sufficient public support. He further added that the inauguration of Hun Manet as Prime Minister did not skip any procedures – saying “My son is not inheriting this role without a lawful process – he has participated in the election as a lawmaker candidate and this is a fundamental step in our democratic system.” Hun Sen also stated his intention to remain as party president and member of parliament and to be appointed as President of the Supreme Privy Council to the King as well as President of the Senate after the 2024 Senate elections. He further said in a speech, "I would like to reaffirm that I am still a politician who continues to lead the country through the presidency of the ruling party, and in the transitional period, I am a member of the National Assembly, go hand in hand with the chairman of the Supreme Council of the King, but this position is not powerful, but I will work with the King as well as help coordinate between the Royal Palace and the Royal Government." On 3 August, Hun Sen has also stated that if Hun Manet were to have a life-threatening problem in the future, he would return to the position of prime minister in order to save the country from falling into anarchy and to ensure the well-being of Cambodians.

On 7 August, His Majesty the King made the appointment in a royal decree signed, and Hun Manet was named Prime Minister of Cambodia. The King also made another signed Royal Decree appointing Hun Manet to organize the Council of Ministers for the Royal Government of the seventh mandate. His Majesty the King made the appointment in a royal decree signed. According to the royal decree, the newly chosen prime minister is responsible for submitting the composition of the Royal Government of the Kingdom of Cambodia for a vote of confidence from the National Assembly, effective immediately. Hun Sen has also said that he will remain prime minister for another 15 days before being promoted to the role of father of the prime minister and other positions. In a statement posted on Hun Sen's Facebook he said, "Looking back, I was the youngest and longest-serving prime minister in the world". He added, "As of August 22, 2023, the day I officially resigned, and as of January 14, 1985, the day the National Assembly voted to give me the confidence to be the Prime Minister, I officially became the Prime Minister. 38 years, 7 months and 8 days is 463 months 2014 weeks and 14,099 days. If you consider the work in the government from January 8, 1979 in the position of Minister of Foreign Affairs, Deputy Prime Minister, Acting Prime Minister and Prime Minister until August 22, 2023, I worked for 44 years, 7 months and 14 days. That would be 535 months, 2,328 weeks and 16,297 days."

On 11 August, Hun Sen said on Wednesday night that National Assembly President, Heng Samin had decided to resign, paving the way for Second Vice-president Khuon Sodary to succeed him and become the Kingdom's first female president. Heng Samrin will leave and be assigned to the King's Supreme Privy Council, while Cheam Yeap, the First Vice-president, will remain in office, while Vong Sauth, the Minister of Social Affairs, Veterans, and Youth Rehabilitation, will become the Second Vice-president. On August 15, Chiv Keng, the Supreme Court's vice president, has been chosen interim president of Cambodia's top court after long-serving president Dith Munty declared his intention to retire. On August 18, Hun Many has announced his decision to resign as member of the National Assembly, in order to focus on his upcoming obligations as a Cabinet minister. The Supreme Privy Council of the King will select new members to the council to extend the body's existing numbers with retired top government executives, and the ruling Cambodian People's Party has come out to support the council's integrity. Hun Sen is set to become President of the Supreme Privy Council.

The 7th National Assembly held its first session on 21 August, nearly a month after its election on 23 July. The occasion will be presided over by King Norodom Sihamoni, according to an announcement made by the NA on August 11. The ceremony is being attended by senior officials, foreign embassies in Cambodia, and representatives from many non-governmental organizations. Following the opening ceremony, the first session will begin, presided over by Heng Samrin, to approve each NA member's mandate and the NA's internal regulations for the 7th mandate. On 22 August, the National Assembly will have a vote of confidence in the new government and continue the first session to elect a president, vice presidents, and leaders of the National Assembly's commissions.

Investiture Hun Manet (CPP)
Candidate →	Hun Manet
Ballot →	22 August 2023
Choice	Votes
Yes	123 / 125
Cambodian People's Party	118
FUNCINPEC	5
No	0 / 125
Abstentions	0 / 125
Absentees	2 / 125
Cambodian People's Party	2
Total votes	125
Required majority →	63 out of 125
