= 2023 Cambodian by-elections =

- 9 April 2023
- 89 seats across 5 district councils
- Turnout: 246 (100%)
Party	Leader	Vote %	Seats	+/–
CPP	Hun Sen (Note: Did not run)	84.96	78	New
Candlelight	Teav Vannol (Note: Did not run)	15.04	11	New
This lists parties that won seats. See the complete results below.

On 9 April 2023, by-elections were held in 5 newly created districts across Cambodia.

The results were an expected landslide victory to the ruling Cambodian People's Party, where the newly emerged opposition party, Candlelight Party was successful in making small gains and inroads. Whereas FUNCINPEC, failed to receive a single vote.

== Background ==
A sub-decree signed by Prime Minister Hun Sen on 5 January stipulated the number of separate and newly formed city council members in Kandal, Kampong Speu and Kratie for the first mandate. The sub-decree added that for Arey Ksat city in Kandal, there are 19 councillors. Separately, Sampov Poun city in Kandal must have 19 councillors as well. The sub-decree added that for Udong Mechey in Kampong Speu, there must be 17 councillors. Sameakki Mean Chey district, located in Kampong Speu, must have 19 councillors. The sub-decree also stated that the newly established O’Kreang Sen Chey district in Kratie must have 15 councillors.

=== Election Timeline ===
Date	Event
8 April 2023	Election silence period
9 April 2023	Election day
24 April 2023	Official results released
Source: Khmer Times

=== Conduct ===
The election was largely uneventful with no significant irregularities cited by election observers and the National Election Committee.

== Electoral System ==
The party with a simple plurality of votes is given the role of Council He'd, regardless of whether they achieve an absolute majority in obtaining votes or seats. Where in addition to this, the composition of the council is decided using closed listproportional representation, under the d'Hondt method, which the number of council seats determined by the National Election Committee (NEC) was 13.

As this is a city council election, there is no universal suffrage, as only councilors who were directly elected in 2022 will be eligible to vote, thus making this election indirect.

== Contesting Parties ==
Party	Party Leader	Districts Contested	Ref.
Candlelight Party	Teav Vannol	5 / 5	
Cambodian People's Party	Hun Sen	5 / 5	
FUNCINPEC	Norodom Chakravuth	5 / 5	

== Results ==
=== Overall ===
Party	Popular Vote			Seats	
Party	Votes	%	Swing	Seats Won	Seat Change
Cambodian People's Party	209	84.96%	New	78	New
Candlelight Party	37	15.04%	New	11	New
FUNCINPEC	0		New	0	New
Total	246	100%		89	
Valid votes	246				
Invalid/blank votes	0				
Total votes	246				
Registered voters/turnout	246 (100%)				
Source: National Election Committee

=== By District ===
==== Sameakki Mean Chey ====
Party	Popular Vote			Seats	
Party	Votes	%	Swing	Seats Won	Seat Change
Cambodian People's Party	62	91.30%	New	18	New
Candlelight Party	6	8.70%	New	1	New
FUNCINPEC	0		New	0	New
Total	68	100%		19	
Valid votes	68				
Invalid/blank votes	0				
Total votes	68				
Registered voters/turnout	68 (100%)				
Source: National Election Committee

==== Udong Meanchey ====
Party	Popular Vote			Seats	
Party	Votes	%	Swing	Seats Won	Seat Change
Cambodian People's Party	32	86.49%	New	15	New
Candlelight Party	5	13.51%	New	2	New
FUNCINPEC	0		New	0	New
Total	37	100%		17	
Valid votes	37				
Invalid/blank votes	0				
Total votes	37				
Registered voters/turnout	37 (100%)				
Source: National Election Committee

==== Sampov Poun ====
Party	Popular Vote			Seats	
Party	Votes	%	Swing	Seats Won	Seat Change
Cambodian People's Party	37	72.55%	New	14	New
Candlelight Party	14	27.45%	New	5	New
FUNCINPEC	0		New	0	New
Total	51	100%		19	
Valid votes	51				
Invalid/blank votes	0				
Total votes	51				
Registered voters/turnout	51 (100%)				
Source: National Election Committee

==== Arey Ksat ====
Party	Popular Vote			Seats	
Party	Votes	%	Swing	Seats Won	Seat Change
Cambodian People's Party	54	83.08%	New	16	New
Candlelight Party	11	16.92%	New	3	New
FUNCINPEC	0		New	0	New
Total	65	100%		19	
Valid votes	65				
Invalid/blank votes	0				
Total votes	65				
Registered voters/turnout	65 (100%)				
Source: National Election Committee

==== O’Kreang Sen Chey ====
Party	Popular Vote			Seats	
Party	Votes	%	Swing	Seats Won	Seat Change
Cambodian People's Party	24	96.00%	New	15	New
Candlelight Party	1	4.00%	New	0	New
FUNCINPEC	0		New	0	New
Total	25	100%		15	
Valid votes	25				
Invalid/blank votes	0				
Total votes	25				
Registered voters/turnout	25 (100%)				
Source: National Election Committee

== Aftermath ==
=== Reactions ===
Sok Eysan, the spokesman for the Cambodian People’s Party, believes the election was a massive success for the party. Where Eysan furthermore stated the results were similar to the party’s "successful dominance" of the 2022 commune elections.

Kimsour Phirith, spokesman for the Candlelight Party, stated that some voters from the Candlelight Party chose to vote for other parties in exchange for favours and bribes. Apart from this, Phirith further stated that the Candlelight Party believed that the election process went over without any irregularities.
