= Cambodia Indigenous Peoples Democracy Party =

Political party in Cambodia

Cambodia Indigenous Peoples Democracy Party គណបក្សជនជាតិដើមប្រជាធិបតេយ្យកម្ពុជា
- Abbreviation: CIPDP
- President: Blang Sin
- Spokesperson: Koy Pany
- Vice President: Sruy Ket
- Founders: Blang Sin
- Founded: September 2015
- Headquarters: Mondulkiri, Cambodia
- Ideology: Environmentalism; Communitarianism; Indigenous rights Anti-corruption; Khmer nationalism
- Colors: Green
- Senate: 0 / 62
- National Assembly: 0 / 125
- Commune chiefs: 0 / 1,652
- Commune councillors: 0 / 11,622
- Provincial, municipal, town and district councillors: 0 / 4,114
- 0 / 25

The Cambodia Indigenous Peoples Democracy Party (Khmer: គណបក្សជនជាតិដើមប្រជាធិបតេយ្យកម្ពុជា, UNGEGN: Konabaksa choncheate daem brachathibteyy kampouchea) is a Cambodian political party aimed at representing the Indigenous population of Cambodia, predominantly in the Northeast. The party has contested every election since its founding, with the latest being the 2023 general election.

== Background ==
Founded in 2015, the CIPDP's political activities mainly focus on the protection of indigenous people's rights, and the protection of land sacred to indigenous communities. The party is also involved in the promotion of indigenous culture. The party is mainly composed of the Bunong-Tampoun indigenous community.

According to party deputy Sroy Khet, "99% of its candidates are indigenous" in the 2023 election.

The party has reached its best election result in 2023, where the CIPDP obtained 52,817 votes or 0.68%, which was a 400% increase in votes.

== Party policies ==
In the party policy bulletin issued by the National Election Committee for the 2022 communal elections, the CIPDP stated its policies were,

The Cambodian Indigenous Democratic Party preserves the identity of the indigenous people.

The Cambodian Indigenous Democratic Party provides public services in a timely manner and without charging citizens.

The Cambodian Indigenous Democratic Party develops border communes and communes and cooperates well with neighboring countries.

The Cambodian Indigenous Democratic Party protects natural resources, does not allow them to be destroyed by corrupt individuals, and enforces the law equally.

The Cambodian Indigenous Democratic Party stops all forms of political discrimination.

The Cambodian Indigenous Democratic Party prevents drug use, violence, and protects the safety of citizens.

The party further stated that its core six political principles were,

1. To stop injustice in society, to stop racial discrimination

2. To respect human rights

3. To stop the encroachment of our citizens’ land by some wealthy and powerful individuals

4. To stop oppression, threats, and corruption

5. To let our citizens own their own land.

6. To make you the true owners of power

== Election results ==
=== General elections ===
Election	Leader	Votes			Seats		Position
Election	Leader	#	%	±	#	±	Position
2018	Blaing Sin	10,197	0.16	New	0 / 125	New	16th
2023	Blaing Sin	52,817	0.68	▲0.52	0 / 125	Steady	▲6th

=== Communal elections ===
Year	Leader	Votes			Chiefs		Councillors		Position
Year	Leader	#	%	±	#	±	#	±	Position
2017	Blaing Sin	1,272	0.02	New	0 / 1,646	New	0 / 11,572	New	10th
2022	Blaing Sin	1,634	0.02	Steady	0 / 1,652	Steady	0 / 11,622	Steady	▼13th
