= Alliance Towards the Future =

Political alliance in Cambodia

Alliance Towards the Future សម្ព័ន្ធភាពឆ្ពោះទៅអនាគត
- Leader: Teav Vannol; Pol Ham; Veng Virak; Kong Molika; Yem Ponhearith
- Founded: 11 October 2023
- Ideology: Liberal democracy Liberalism; Factions: Progressivism; Populism; Social democracy
- Political position: Centre to centre-left
- Alliance parties: CLP; KWP; GDP; CRP; KP
- Colors: Turquoise (Customary)
- Senate: 3 / 62
- National Assembly: 0 / 125
- Commune Chiefs: 4 / 1,652
- Commune councilors: 2,204 / 11,622
- Provincial Governors: 0 / 25
- Provincial councils: 47 / 559
- Municipal, District and Khan Councils: 312 / 3,641

The Alliance Towards the Future (Khmer: សម្ព័ន្ធភាពឆ្ពោះទៅអនាគត, UNGEGN: Sâmpoănthôphéap Chhpŏăh Tŏu Ânéakôt) is an opposition alliance in Cambodia. The opposition alliance includes the Candlelight Party and three minor parties, the Khmer Will Party, the Grassroots Democratic Party, and the Cambodia Reform Party, with its main focus is to field candidates in the 2024 senate and provincial elections and the general election of 2028 as well as the local commune elections of 2027.

== Background ==
After the Candlelight Party was officially denied registration by the National Election Committee, meaning that they were disqualified from participating in the election. The reason given was a failure to submit proper registration documents, which the party said it would appeal. The representatives of the Candlelight Party (CP) have agreed to meet with the Ministry of Interior to resolve issues with the party's misplaced original registration papers. Parties are only permitted to take part in national elections under the rules set forth by the National Election Committee if they present the identical original document that was shared with the Interior Ministry at the time of the party's registration. In the most recent National Election, the CLP was disqualified from running for office after failing to present it. In order to restore its status as a duly registered party with the ministry, the opposition party requested the meeting in order to obtain a copy of the original paperwork from the ministry. The ministry however stated that they must retain a copy of the original document for their records and that they are unable to give it to the CLP.

After getting denied the documents by the Ministry of Interior, in order to challenge the ruling party's dominance in the next elections forward, the Candlelight party has teamed up with three minority parties that were unable to win any seats: Khmer Will Party, Grassroots Democratic group, and Cambodia Reform Party. The alliance known as "Alliance Towards The Future" was unveiled, with its goal is to unite power through collective democracy in order to challenge the CPP in the commune elections of 2027 and the national elections of 2028. All four parties will keep their own parties, but a working group will be established to oversee the Alliance Towards the Future process. Additionally, they will designate districts to which candidates from each party will run in the election. Some political analysts expressing concern over whether the alliance will face the same fate as of CNRP.

On 8 November 2023, the Alliance had chosen to support the Khmer Will Party list for the 2024 senate and provincial elections, members of CLP are welcome to join the KWP to contest in the elections. The NEC later which approved the list of KWP candidates for the 2024 senate election.

On the 8th of October 2024, the Kampuchea Niyum Party, which was previously a part of the Khmer National United Party, joined the alliance.

== Electoral history ==
=== Senate elections ===
Election	Party leader	Votes			Seats		Position
Election	Party leader	#	%	±	#	±	Position
2024	Kong Monika	1,394	11.92	New	3 / 62	New	▲2nd

=== Provincial elections ===
Election	Party leader	Votes			Seats				Position
Election	Party leader	Votes			Provincial councils		Municipal councils		Position
Election	Party leader	#	%	±	#	±	#	±	Position
2024	Kong Monika	1,282	11.08	▲11.08	47 / 559	▲47	312 / 3,641	▲312	▲2nd
