= 2012 Cambodian communal elections =

← 2007	3 June 2012	2017 →

1,633 Commune Chiefs 11,459 Commune Councillors
- Registered: 9,203,493 ▲18.0%
- Turnout: 5,993,992 (65.1%) ▼2.8%
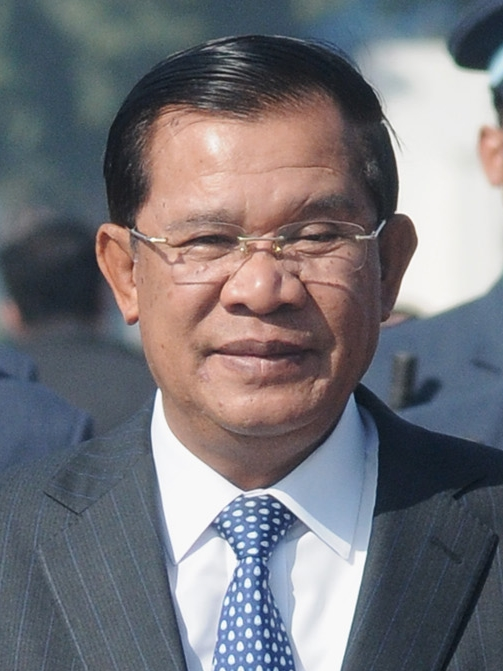

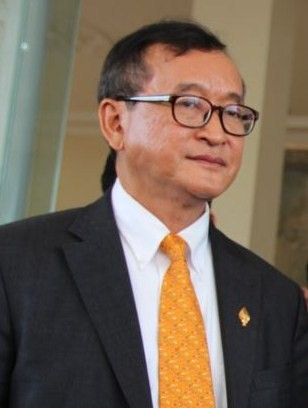

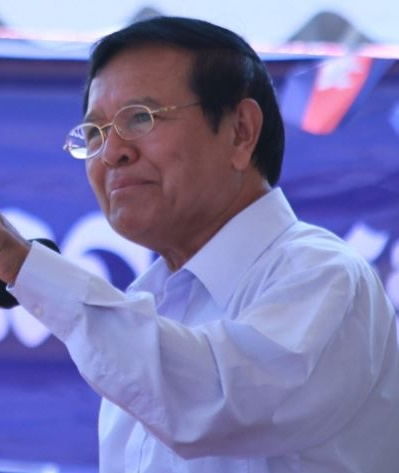
	First party	Second party	Third party
Leader	Hun Sen	Sam Rainsy	Kem Sokha
Party	CPP	SRP	HRP
Leader since	14 January 1985	2 November 1995	22 July 2007
Last election	1,591 chiefs 7,993 councillors 60.8%	28 chiefs 2,660 councillors 25.2%	Did not contest
Popular vote	3,631,082	1,224,460	580,483
Percentage	61.8%	20.8%	9.9%
Swing	▲1.0%	▼4.4%	New
Chiefs	1,592	22	18
Chiefs +/–	▲1	▼6	New
Councillors	8,292	2,155	800
Councillors +/–	▲299	▼505	New
- Results by commune

Local elections were held in Cambodia on 3 June 2012.

== Results ==
Party	Votes	%	Chiefs	+/–	Councillors	+/–
Cambodian People's Party	3,631,082	61.80	1,592	+1	8,292	+299
Sam Rainsy Party	1,224,460	20.84	22	–6	2,155	–505
Human Rights Party	580,483	9.88	18	New	800	New
FUNCINPEC	222,663	3.79	1	–1	151	–123
Norodom Ranariddh Party	170,962	2.91	0	–46	52	–373
League for Democracy Party	26,916	0.46	0	0	8	+8
Cambodian Nationality Party	16,616	0.28	0	New	1	New
Khmer Anti-Poverty Party	1,940	0.03	0	New	0	New
Republican Democracy Party	489	0.01	0	New	0	New
Democratic Movement Party	108	0.00	0	0	0	0
Invalid/blank votes	118,273	–	–	–	–	–
Total	5,993,992	100	1,633	+12	11,459	+106
Registered voters/turnout	9,203,493	65.13	–	–	–	–
Source: National Election Committee
