= Saing =

Saing may refer to:

- Chay Saing Yun, Cambodian politician
- Sai Htee Saing (1950–2008), Burmese singer-songwriter
- Saing Pen (born 1926), Cambodian equestrian
- Tan Yu Saing, Burmese politician
- Yang Saing Koma, Cambodian academic
