= Supreme Council of Consultants =

The Supreme Council of Consultants is composed of various representatives of political parties in Cambodia that will be tasked with giving ideas and feedback to draft laws before the Council of Ministers. The council will be able to submit petitions to the Senate over the draft laws passed by the National Assembly and will also provide comments to the Prime Minister for any injustice or abuses by officials.

The President of the Council is elected to carry out a one-month task with a monthly rotation based on each party’s ballot slot positions of the National Election Committee of Cambodia. The meeting between the council and the Prime Minister is set for every six months or in an urgent call made by the Prime Minister.
