= 2017 Cambodian communal elections =

- 4 June 2017

1,646 Commune Chiefs 11,572 Commune Councillors
- Registered: 7,865,033 ▼14.5pp
- Turnout: 7,107,395 (90.4%) ▲25.2pp
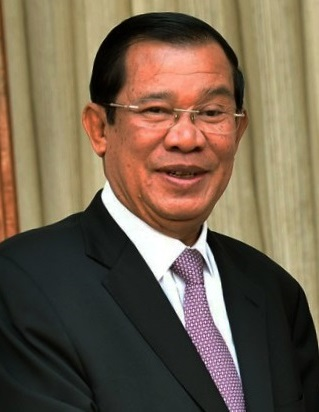

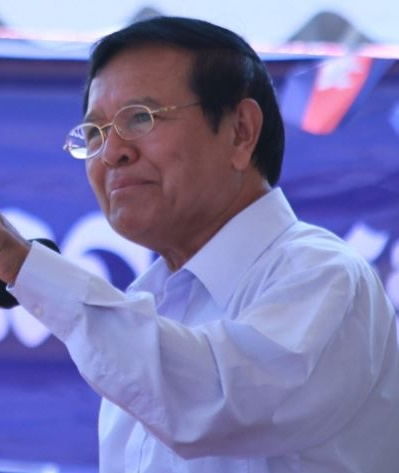
	First party	Second party
Leader	Hun Sen	Kem Sokha
Party	CPP	CNRP
Leader since	14 January 1985	2 March 2017
Last election	1,592 chiefs 8,292 councillors 61.8%	40 chiefs 2,955 councillors 30.7% (combined)
Popular vote	3,540,056	3,056,824
Percentage	50.8%	43.8%
Swing	▼11.0pp	▲13.1pp
Chiefs	1,156	489
Chiefs +/–	▼436	▲449
Councillors	6,503	5,007
Councillors +/–	▼1,789	▲2,052

Communal elections (Khmer: ការបោះឆ្នោតជ្រើសរើសក្រុមប្រឹក្សាឃុំសង្កាត់ អាណត្តិទី៤ ឆ្នាំ២០១៧) were held in Cambodia on Sunday, 4 June 2017. The National Election Committee (NEC) announced that some 7.8 million of 9.6 million eligible Cambodians were registered to cast their ballots. 94,595 candidates from 12 political parties contested the 11,572 commune council seats in 1,646 communes of Cambodia. Voter turnout was a record 90.37%. There were concerns surrounding some irregularities in the polling.

The result was a victory for the Cambodian People's Party, albeit with a smaller majority, and saw large gains by the Cambodia National Rescue Party. Ultimately, the strong showing by the opposition led to its dissolve before it could contest the national elections. Mithuna Phuthong became the first woman to be elected governor of a Cambodian province.

== Results ==
Party	Votes	%	Chiefs	+/–	Councillors	+/–
Cambodian People's Party	3,540,056	50.76	1,156	–436	6,503	–1,789
Cambodia National Rescue Party	3,056,824	43.83	489	+449	5,007	+2,052
FUNCINPEC	132,319	1.90	0	–1	28	–123
League for Democracy Party	122,882	1.76	0	0	4	–4
Khmer National United Party	78,724	1.13	1	New	24	New
Beehive Social Democratic Party	31,334	0.45	0	New	1	New
Grassroots Democratic Party	4,981	0.07	0	New	5	New
Cambodian Nationality Party	2,161	0.03	0	0	0	–1
Cambodian Youth Party	1,505	0.02	0	New	0	New
Cambodia Indigenous People's Democracy Party	1,272	0.02	0	New	0	New
Khmer Power Party	1,035	0.01	0	New	0	New
Republican Democracy Party	818	0.01	0	0	0	0
Total	6,973,911	100	1,646	+13	11,572	+113
Valid votes	6,973,911	98.12				
Invalid/blank votes	133,484	1.88				
Total votes	7,107,395	100				
Registered voters/turnout	7,865,033	90.37				
Source: COMFREL
