= 2022 Cambodian communal elections =

Mr Hun Sen

2022 Cambodian communal election
- 5 June 2022

All 1,652 Commune Chiefs (C) All 11,622 seats in the Commune Council (c)
- Registered: 9,205,681 17.0%
- Turnout: 7,394,427 (80.3%) 10.1%
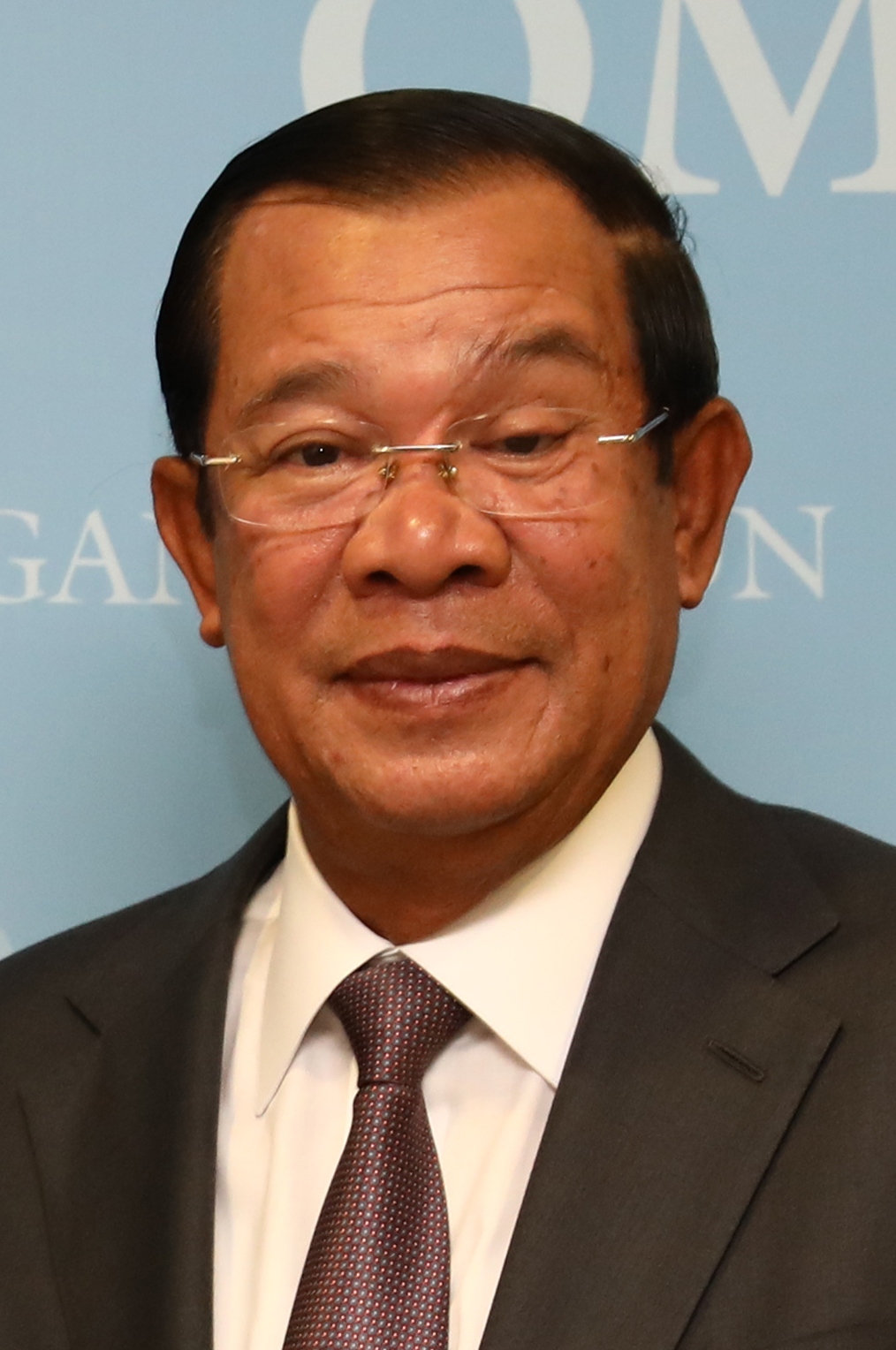

	First party	Second party
Leader	Hun Sen	Teav Vannol
Party	CPP	Candlelight
Leader since	20 June 2015	2 November 2015
Seats won	1,648 (C) · 9,376 (c)	4 (C) · 2,198 (c)
Seat change	492 (C) · 2,873 (c)	4 (C) · 2,198 (c)
Popular vote	5,378,773	1,610,556
Percentage	74.3%	22.2%
Swing	23.5%	22.2%
Party	Seats	+/–
Communal Chief
Cambodian People's Party	1648	+492
Candlelight Party	4	+4
This lists parties that won seats. See the complete results below.
Party	Seats	+/–
Communal Councilor
Cambodian People's Party	9376	+2873
Candlelight Party	2198	+2198
FUNCINPEC	19	−8
Khmer National United Party	13	−11
Cambodia National Love Party	5	+5
Cambodian Youth Party	3	+3
Grassroots Democratic Party	6	+1
Kampucheaniyum Party	1	+1
Beehive Social Democratic Party	1	0
This lists parties that won seats. See the complete results below.
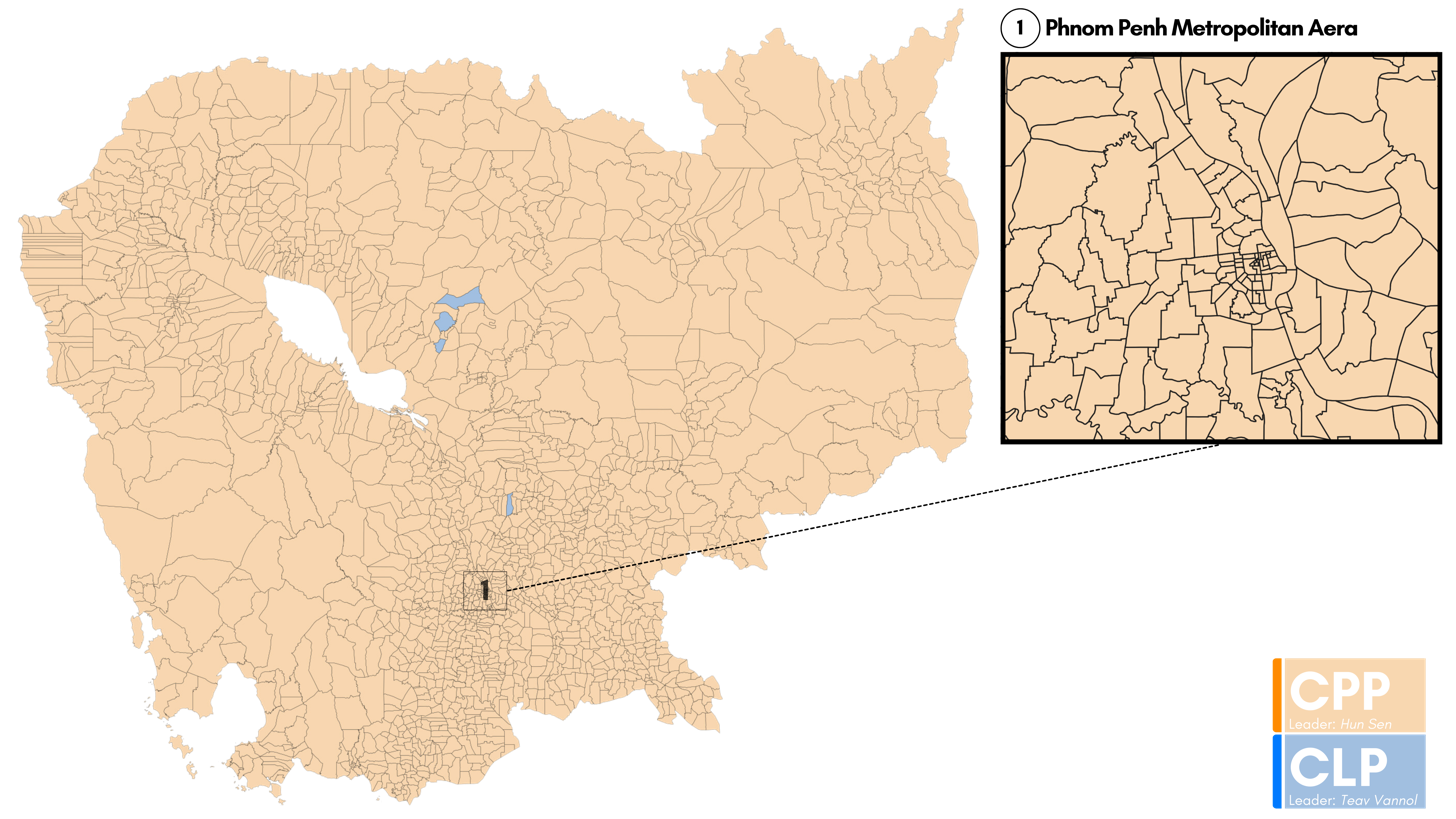

Communal elections were held in Cambodia on 5 June 2022. It was the fifth quinquennial communal election in Cambodia since 2002. 1,652 communes in all 25 provinces of Cambodia were contested for a total of 11,622 commune council seats. The election precedes the 2023 general election and the 2024 Senate election. 9.2 million of 10.5 million eligible voters were registered to cast their ballots. Voter turnout was 80.3%.

The result was a landslide victory for the Cambodian People's Party which won 74% of the popular vote, 1,648 commune chiefs, and more than 9,000 commune councillors. The resurgent Candlelight Party, a faction of the disbanded Cambodia National Rescue Party, won 22% of the popular vote, but only 4 commune chiefs. It also marked the first time ever that no party was led by either Sam Rainsy, Kem Sokha, and Norodom Ranariddh. The aftermath of the election was marked by continued arrests of opposition supporters.

== Background ==
The main opposition Cambodia National Rescue Party was dissolved in November 2017 following the communal elections.

== Major parties contesting ==
82,786 candidates from 17 political parties contested the election according to the National Election Committee (NEC). The Cambodian People's Party (CPP) had fielded candidates in all 1,652 communes, followed by the Candlelight Party at 1,632 communes, and FUNCINPEC at 688 communes.

Parties contesting the elections:

- Beehive Social Democratic Party
- Cambodia Reform Party
- Cambodian Democratic Indigenous People's Party
- Cambodian Nation Love Party
- Cambodian Nationality Party
- Cambodian People's Party
- Cambodian Youth Party
- Candlelight Party
- FUNCINPEC
- Grassroots Democratic Party
- Kampucheaniyum Party
- Khmer Economic Development Party
- Khmer National United Party
- Khmer United Party
- Khmer Will Party
- Reaksmey Khemara Party

== Results ==
Party	Votes	%	Swing	Chiefs	+/–	Councillors	+/–
Cambodian People's Party	5,378,773	74.32	23.5	1,648	492	9,376	2,873
Candlelight Party	1,610,556	22.25	22.2	4	4	2,198	2198
FUNCINPEC	91,798	1.27	0.63	0	0	19	9
Khmer National United Party	63,868	0.88	0.25	0	1	13	11
Cambodia National Love Party	33,259	0.46	0.46	0	0	5	5
Cambodian Youth Party	13,841	0.19	0.17	0	0	3	3
Cambodia Nationality Party	13,140	0.18	0.15	0	0	0	0
Khmer Will Party	7,556	0.10	0.10	0	0	0	0
Grassroots Democratic Party	6,807	0.09	0.02	0	0	6	1
Cambodia Reform Party	5,024	0.07	0.07	0	0	0	0
Kampucheaniyum Party	4,856	0.07	0.07	0	0	1	1
Beehive Social Democratic Party	2,460	0.03	0.42	0	0	1	0
Cambodia Indigenous People's Democracy Party	1,634	0.02	0	0	0	0	0
Khmer United Party	1,599	0.02	0.02	0	0	0	0
Ekpheap Cheat Khmer Party	1,126	0.02	0.02	0	0	0	0
Reaksmey Khemara Party	446	0.01	0.01	0	0	0	0
Khmer Economic Development Party	294	0.00	0.00	0	0	0	0
Total	7,237,037	100	100	1,652	6	11,622	50
Valid votes	7,237,037	97.87					
Invalid/blank votes	157,390	2.13					
Total votes	7,394,427	100					
Registered voters/turnout	9,205,681	80.3					
Source: National Election Committee

Province	CPP		CLP		FUNCINPEC	
Province	Votes	%	Votes	%	Votes	%
Banteay Meanchey	194,543	72.23%	55,900	20.75%	4,381	1.63%
Battambang	347,062	76.10%	94,744	20.77%	5,521	1.21%
Kampong Cham	339,279	70.09%	125,875	26.00%	4,836	1.00%
Kampong Chhnang	202,957	71.40%	66,991	23.57%	6,323	2.22%
Kampong Speu	384,954	78.13%	90,002	18.27%	6,946	1.21%
Kampong Thom	205,882	62.63%	94,323	28.69%	16,226	4.94%
Kampot	232,479	73.19%	75,999	23.93%	5,279	1.68%
Kandal	481,744	74.18%	154,371	23.77%	5,008	0.77%
Koh Kong	44,992	79.56%	10,356	18.31%	64	0.11%
Kratié	120,550	72.62%	35,216	21.22%	5,505	3.32%
Mondulkiri	29,676	82.33%	4,434	12.30%	281	0.78%
Phnom Penh	536,625	76.95%	151,262	21.69%	3,395	0.49%
Preah Vihear	84,791	73.68%	25,130	21.84%	1,763	1.53%
Prey Veng	398,045	71.35%	140,728	25.23%	3,783	0.68%
Pursat	195,656	85.26%	32,143	14.01%	605	0.26%
Ratanakiri	69,838	83.31%	11,735	14.00%	160	0.19%
Siem Reap	306,668	69.37%	115,589	26.15%	6,938	1.57%
Preah Sihanouk	86,308	80.10%	17,400	16.15%	1,857	1.72%
Stung Treng	55,898	77.98%	12,009	16.75%	2,663	3.71%
Svay Rieng	245,164	74.98%	75,528	23.10%	3,480	1.06%
Takéo	406,958	75.83%	118,061	22.00%	2,331	0.43%
Kep	19,284	84.86%	2,893	12.73%	442	1.95%
Pailin	25,458	81.79%	5,095	16.37%	0	0.00%
Oddar Meanchey	87,069	80.67%	16,353	15.15%	178	0.16%
Tboung Khmum	276,895	75.72%	78,419	21.44%	4,833	1.32%
Source: National Election Committee
