= 2002 Cambodian communal elections =

- 3 February 2002

1,621 Commune Chiefs 11,261 Commune Councillors
- Registered: 5,190,307
- Turnout: 4,543,974 (87.6%)
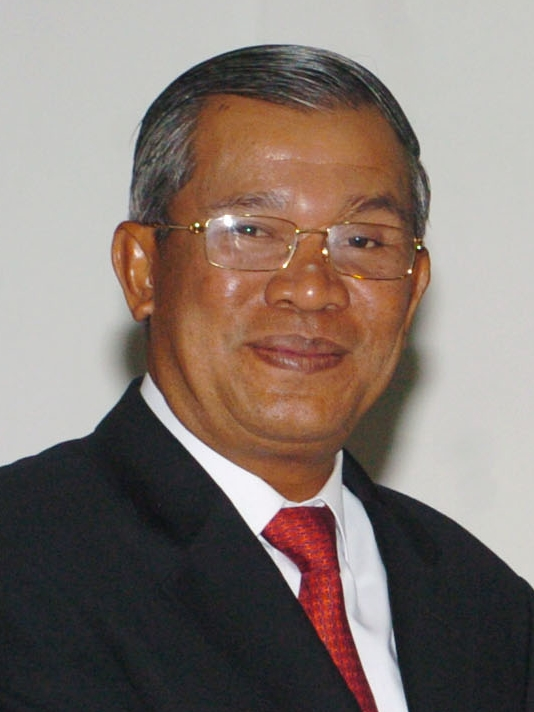

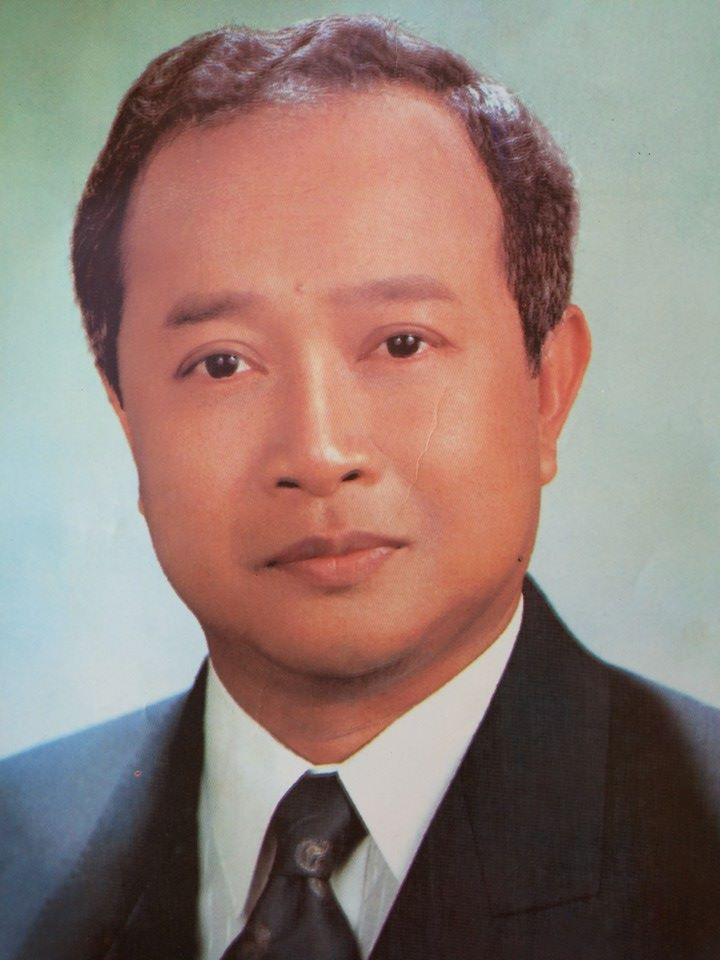

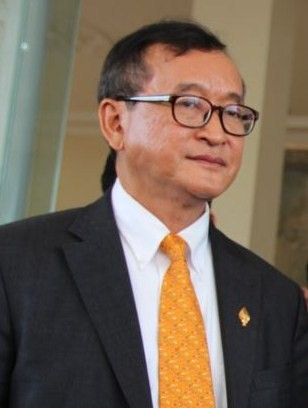
	First party	Second party	Third party
Leader	Hun Sen	Norodom Ranariddh	Sam Rainsy
Party	CPP	FUNCINPEC	SRP
Leader since	14 January 1985	October 1992	2 November 1995
Popular vote	2,647,849	955,200	736,454
Percentage	60.9%	22.0%	16.9%
Chiefs	1,598	10	13
Councillors	7,552	2,194	1,329

Communal elections were held in Cambodia for the first time on 3 February 2002.

== Results ==
Party	Votes	%	Chiefs	Councillors
Cambodian People's Party	2,647,849	60.89	1,598	7,552
FUNCINPEC	955,200	21.97	10	2,194
Sam Rainsy Party	736,454	16.93	13	1,329
Other parties	9,061	0.21	0	186
Invalid/blank votes	195,410	–	–	–
Total	4,543,974	100	1,621	11,261
Registered voters/turnout	5,190,307	87.55	–	–
Source: COMFREL
