= Yang Saing Koma =

Yang Saing Koma (Khmer: យ៉ង សាំងកុមារ, * 1966 in Tram Kak District, Takeo Province) is the founder of the Cambodian Center for Study and Development in Agriculture (CEDAC) and renowned for his creative fusion of practical science and collective will that has inspired and enabled farmers in Cambodia. He is recipient of the Ramon Magsaysay Award.

== Political career ==
Yang Saing Koma currently is a member of the Central Committee of the Cambodian People's Party (CPP) and Secretary of State in the Cambodian Ministry of Agriculture, Forestry and Fisheries. He is in charge of the Sixth Priority Policy for the deployment of 1,600 Commune Agricultural Officers (CAOs) for agricultural extension.
