= Cambodian Youth Party =

Cambodian political party

Cambodian Youth Party គណបក្សយុវជនកម្ពុជា
- Abbreviation: CYP
- Leader: Pich Sros
- Founded: 24 December 2015
- Headquarters: No. 881, Street 74, Sangkat Chom Chao, Khan Pou Senchey, Phnom Penh
- Membership (2016): 10,000
- Ideology: Populism
- Colors: Dark Blue
- Slogan: "សេរីភាព យុត្តិធម៌ អភិវឌ្ឍន៍" ("Freedom, Justice, Development")
- Senate: 0 / 62
- National Assembly: 0 / 125
- Commune chiefs: 0 / 1,652
- Commune councillors: 3 / 11,622

Website
- https://www.cambodianyouthparty.org/

The Cambodian Youth Party (CYP; Khmer: គណបក្សយុវជនកម្ពុជា) is a pro-government party created by Pich Sros. It is known for being one of the parties that called for the Cambodia National Rescue Party (CNRP) to dissolve after allegedly conspiring to overthrow the current government. The party is also one of the twenty parties involved in the Consultation Forum created by current Prime Minister Hun Sen. During its time as part of the forum, the CYP has also managed to conserve the Boeung Prek Toap lake.

== Background ==
The CYP was created by Pich Sros in December 2015 as a way to focus on the disadvantaged youth in Cambodia, and to create job opportunities and education for them, saying "Youth's interest is the reason I made this party." He aims to do this by running in the next Cambodian general election, scheduled for 29 July 2018.

== Recent electoral history ==
=== General election ===
Year	Party leader	Votes			Seats		Position	Government
Year	Party leader	#	%	±	#	±	Position	Government
2018	Pich Sros	39,333	0.62	New	0 / 125	New	▲12th	CPP
2023	Pich Sros	97,412	1.25	▲0.63	0 / 125	0	▲4th	CPP

=== Communal elections ===
Communal elections
Year	Party leader	Votes			Chiefs		Councillors		Position
Year	Party leader	#	%	±	#	±	#	±	Position
2017	Pich Sros	1,505	0.02	▲0.02	0 / 1,646	Steady	0 / 11,572	Steady	▲9th
2022	Pich Sros	13,643	0.19	▲0.17	0 / 1,652	Steady	3 / 11,622	▲3	▲6th
