= Khmer Will Party =

Cambodian political party

Khmer Will Party គណបក្សឆន្ទៈខ្មែរ
- Abbreviation: KWP
- President: Kong Monika
- Founded: 2018
- Preceded by: Cambodia National Rescue Party (self-declared; not legally)
- Ideology: Populism; Liberal democracy Khmer nationalism
- Political position: Centre
- Religion: Theravada Buddhism
- National affiliation: Alliance Towards the Future
- Colours: Red
- Slogan: "សាមគ្គី គង់វង្ស ថ្កើនថ្កាន" ("Solidarity, Longevity, Prosperity")
- Senate: 3 / 62
- National Assembly: 0 / 125
- Provincial, municipal, town and district councillors: 359 / 4,114

The Khmer Will Party (KWP; Khmer: គណបក្សឆន្ទៈខ្មែរ) is a Cambodian political party founded in 2018. Its president is Kong Monika, son of former senior now dissolved-CNRP official Kong Korm. It came fourth in the 2018 general election, but did not win any seats. As the alliance partner Candlelight Party faces legal issues Khmer Will Party became a crucial front for elections, and alliance decided to list certain names under KWP list. Due to the CLP’s exclusion from the Senate elections, many senior and prominent former CLP members seeking election to the Senate moved to two other parties, the Khmer Will Party and the Nation Power Party. These strategic allotments and being a legal front for the barred parties allowed Khmer Will Party to secure three seats in the 2024 election for the opposition.

== Recent electoral history ==
General election
Election	Party leader	Votes			Seats		Position	Government
Election	Party leader	#	%	±	#	±	Position	Government
2018	Kong Monika	212,869	3.35%	New	0 / 125	New	▲4th	CPP

Communal elections
Year	Party leader	Votes			Chiefs		Councillors		Position
Year	Party leader	#	%	±	#	±	#	±	Position
2022	Kong Monika	7,536	0.10	New	0 / 1,652	Steady	TBD		▲8th

=== Senate elections ===
Election	Party leader	Votes			Seats		Position
Election	Party leader	#	%	±	#	±	Position
2024	Kong Monika	1394	11.01	New	3 / 62	New	TBD
