= Grassroots Democratic Party (Cambodia) =

Cambodian political party

Grassroots Democratic Party គណបក្សប្រជាធិបតេយ្យមូលដ្ឋាន
- President: Sek Sokha
- Vice President: Sam Sundeoum
- Media Support Team: Khmer CMS
- Founders: Kem Ley; Yang Saing Koma; Sam Inn
- Founded: 2 August 2015; 10 years ago
- Headquarters: 38 St. 1972, Phnom Penh, Cambodia
- Membership (2018): 10,000
- Ideology: Grassroots democracy Social democracy Social liberalism
- Political position: Centre-left
- National affiliation: Alliance Towards the Future
- Colors: Green
- Senate: 0 / 62
- National Assembly: 0 / 125
- Commune Council: 5 / 11,572
- Local government: 0 / 4,114

Website
- www.gdpcambodia.org

The Grassroots Democratic Party (GDP; Khmer: គណបក្សប្រជាធិបតេយ្យមូលដ្ឋាន, abbr. គ.ប.ម.) is an independent political party based in Phnom Penh, Cambodia. It is led by Sek Sokha as Party President, Mean Eang as Chair of Board of Governance, Thuok Bona as Chair of Dispute Resolution and Discipline and Lim Bungkea as Secretary-General. The party is one of the candidates in the 2018 and 2023 Cambodian parliamentary election of the National Assembly.

== Background ==
The Grassroots Democratic Party was founded on 2 August 2015 by former non-government organization (NGO) leaders, intellectuals and community leaders from more than 10 communes of Cambodia. The key founding members of GDP are Dr. Kem Ley (assassinated on 10 July 2016), Dr. Yang Saing Koma, Mr. Yeng Virak and Dr. Sam Inn and more. Dr. Yang Saing Koma and Dr. Sam Inn defected to CPP.

== Party officers ==
Board of Governance - Mr. Mean Eang

Executive Chairperson - Mr. Sek Sokha

Vice Executive Chairperson - Mr. Sam Sundoeun

Secretary General - Mr. Lim Bungkea

Deputy Secretary General - Mr. Pen Vanna

Committee Chairman of discipline and resolution - Thuok Bona

== Party platform ==
The original ideas behind the founding of the GDP were as follows:

1. The extreme rivalry between the two main political parties, Cambodian People's Party (CPP) and the former Cambodia National Rescue Party (CNRP), creating a negative impact on the political atmosphere and the democratization process in Cambodia. The existing political leaders tended to focus more on attacking and blaming each other rather than on developing appropriate policies to resolve social and economic national issues.
2. The lack of a culture and environment that would enable Cambodian citizens, particularly young people, women and other responsible citizens, to participate actively in the political process without fear and discrimination. There is no political party with an intra party mechanism that allows free and active participation of members. Generally, all political parties tended to adopt a top down approach.

== Brief profile of the party ==
The official logo of the party is triangular representing “bottom-up democracy.” The logo has four colors: green, blue, red and white. The official color of the party is green, representing grassroots democracy and sustainable development.
The core values of GDP are:

1. Solidarity
2. Justice
3. Non-violence
4. Freedom
5. Integrity
6. Republicanism

The vision of the party is “All Cambodian citizens living in dignity and the country has full national sovereignty.”
The mission of the party is “To nurture good leaders and building democratic foundation for the whole nation.”
The party has adopted the following internal principles:

1. Open and voluntary
2. Member democracy
3. Decentralization
4. Facilitating and capacity building roles of leaders
5. Financial autonomy
6. Enabling active participation of women and youth

The national structure of the GDP:

- General Assembly (GA), consisting of up to 300 delegates
- Board of Governance, with chairman elected by the General Assembly (GA)
- Executive Committee (EC), with the president elected by the GA. The president of the EC is also the official president of the GDP
- Conflict Resolution and Discipline Committee, with the chairperson elected by the GA

The current national leaders of the GDP are:

1. Mr. Sek Sokha – Executive Committee
2. Mr. Mean Eang – Chairman of the governance board
3. Mr. Thuok Bona – Chairman of the conflict resolution and discipline committee
4. Mr. Lim Bungkea – general secretary (elected by the Board of Governance)
  win

The party garnered 70,291 or 1.11% of the popularity votes cast on July 29, 2018 parliamentary election but short of winning a single seat in the National Assembly.

== Local election 2017 ==
The GDP participated in the local (Commune -Sangkat) elections held on 3 June 2017 by competing in 27 communes, winning five seats in three communes. The average results in 27 communes indicated that GDP ranked third after the two main rivals (CPP and CNRP), but in Pate commune GDP ranked second, receiving the same number of seats as CPP (CPP - 2, GDP - 2, CNRP - 1). Following the dissolution of CNRP, the GDP did not accept any re-allocation of CNRP seats.

== National Election 2018 ==
The GDP participated in the national election held on 29 July 2018 and competed in all 25 constituencies. The party presented itself as the new alternative and the new hope for all Cambodians.

The GDP's political platform consisting of 125 key policies which are presented in the “Green Book.” The 125 policies are classified in national reconciliation and unity policies, national building policies, national protection and security policies and international cooperation policies. As part of the national reconciliation and unity, the GDP aims to create a solidarity government by inviting all political parties with National Assembly (NA) seats to form super nation building councils by inviting all former top national political leaders to be members.

For the election campaign among the general population, the GDP has summarized the key nation building policies in a one-page format which is known as Sor 5 policies, the Khmer acronym for five sectors, including: economy and jobs, health, education and youth, social welfare and public services and democratic governance. Among the 125 policies, 15 policies have been selected for the general campaign:

=== Economy and jobs ===
1. 5,000 agriculture development facilitators will work with farmers throughout Cambodia to address issues including: of lacking water, capital, market and appropriate technologies
2. Registered Small Medium Enterprises (SMEs) will qualify for five years of tax exemption. Provision of subsidized loans of 6 percent per year will be available to agro and food processing entrepreneurs and exporters in developing markets for Cambodian products.
3. Young people wanting to start their own business will receive seed capital of US$1,250 as well as a long-term subsidized loan

=== Health care ===
1. A universal health care plan will be developed at 500 riel per citizen per month (18 to 65 years old)
2. Develop health centers and hospitals with high professional standards. All health officials will receive a minimum salary of US$500 per month.
3. Ensure an effective implementation of food safety laws and regulations

Education and youth

1. Every village will have access to a quality kindergarten and qualified teachers
2. Every student will be eligible to obtain a study loan up to US$1,250 per year
3. Schools and universities will be required to have high professional standards, and all teachers will receive minimum salary of US$500 per month

=== Social protection and welfare ===
1. Every woman will get US$125 for every birth delivery
2. Citizens over age 65 will get a US$37.50 per month pension
3. Every worker will be eligible to receive unemployment benefits up to 50 percent of salary for five months

=== Public services and democratic governance ===
1. All Members of Parliament are accountable to citizens, not to government
2. All government officials are accountable to citizens and Members of Parliament (Good Government Officials)
3. Active citizen participation will be encouraged to ensure accountable government and parliament (Good Citizens).

The party will meet again in June 2018 to decide the next step in the process of participation in the election, including the election of the top candidate or prime minister (PM) candidate.

The GDP recognizes that one of the factors for free and fair elections is to ensure that there is a sufficient number of election observers at all polling stations, including both independent observers (national and international observers), as well as observers recruited directly by the GDP.

The party garnered 70,291 or 1.11% of the popular votes on July 29, 2018 parliamentary election but short of winning a seat in the National Assembly of Cambodia.

== Recent electoral history ==
General election
Year	Party leader	Votes			Seats		Position	Government
Year	Party leader	#	%	±	#	±	Position	Government
2018	Yeng Virak	70,567	1.11	New	0 / 125	New	▲6th	CPP
2023	Yeng Virak	35,413	0.46	▼0.65	0 / 125	Steady	▼8th	CPP

Communal elections
Year	Party leader	Votes			Chiefs		Councillors		Position
Year	Party leader	#	%	±	#	±	#	±	Position
2017	Yeng Virak	4,981	0.07	▲0.07	0 / 1,646	New	5 / 11,572	▲5	▲7th
2022	Yeng Virak	6,757	0.09	▲0.02	0 / 1,652	Steady	6 / 11,622	▲1	▼9th
