= 2018 Cambodian general election =

- 29 July 2018
- All 125 seats in the National Assembly; 63 seats needed for a majority
- Turnout: 83.02% (▲13.41pp)
Party	Leader	Vote %	Seats	+/–
CPP	Hun Sen	76.85	125	+57
This lists parties that won seats. See the complete results below.
Results by provinces
Prime Minister before	Prime Minister after
Hun Sen; CPP	Hun Sen; CPP

General elections were held in Cambodia on Sunday, 29 July 2018 to elect members of the sixth National Assembly. Polling stations opened at 07:00 and closed at 15:00. The number of registered voters has decreased for the first time since 1993 and was down 13% from the 2013 general elections.

With the absence of a credible opposition, the elections were viewed as a formality to effectively solidify de facto one-party rule in the country, and were dismissed as sham elections by the international community. They resulted in a widely expected landslide victory for the ruling Cambodian People's Party (CPP), which won all 125 seats in the National Assembly. Despite calls to boycott the election, voter turnout was alleged to be 83.02%.

== Background ==
The previous elections in July 2013 saw a fourth consecutive victory for the CPP, which won 68 seats in the National Assembly, with the opposition Cambodia National Rescue Party (CNRP) claiming the remaining 55 seats. Despite their huge gain in seats, the opposition decried the results and accused the CPP of poll fraud. As a result, the CNRP boycotted parliament in September 2013 and vowed not to enter parliament until electoral reforms had been made. The disputed results led to the outbreak of widespread anti-government protests.

On 10 April 2014, Prime Minister Hun Sen agreed to hold elections five months early in February 2018. However, the opposition rejected the suggestion, demanding elections be held as early as 2015 or mid-2016. On 22 July 2014, the political crisis officially ended and the opposition agreed to take their seats in parliament. It was also agreed that the next elections would be held in 2018. However, CNRP leader Sam Rainsy was stripped from parliamentary immunity, and then barred from returning to Cambodia after leaving the country. His request for a royal pardon was blocked by Sen, and in December 2016, his deputy Kem Sokha replaced him as Minority Leader.

On 11 February 2017, Rainsy resigned as President of the CNRP, and was succeeded by Sokha. On 3 September, Sokha was arrested and charged with treason, raising questions about the party's future. Another act of repression by the government was the closure of the Cambodia Daily newspaper. On 16 November 2017, the CNRP was forcibly dissolved, eliminating any real challenge to the long-ruling CPP. Its seats in parliament were distributed to three other parties.

== Results ==
Party	Votes	%	Seats	+/–
Cambodian People's Party	4,889,113	76.85	125	+57
FUNCINPEC	374,510	5.89	0	0
League for Democracy Party	309,364	4.86	0	0
Khmer Will Party	212,869	3.35	0	New
Khmer National United Party	99,377	1.56	0	New
Grassroots Democratic Party	70,567	1.11	0	New
Beehive Social Democratic Party	56,024	0.88	0	New
Khmer Anti-Poverty Party	55,298	0.87	0	0
Khmer United Party	48,785	0.77	0	New
Cambodian Nationality Party	45,370	0.71	0	0
Khmer Republican Party	41,631	0.65	0	0
Cambodian Youth Party	39,333	0.62	0	New
Dharmacracy Party	29,060	0.46	0	New
Khmer Economic Development Party	23,255	0.37	0	0
Khmer Rise Party	22,002	0.35	0	New
Ponleu Thmey Party	13,509	0.21	0	New
Cambodia Indigenous Peoples Democracy Party	10,197	0.16	0	New
Our Motherland Party	9,174	0.14	0	New
Republican Democracy Party	8,591	0.14	0	0
Reaksmey Khemara Party	4,212	0.07	0	New
Total	6,362,241	100.00	125	+2
Valid votes	6,362,241	91.45		
Invalid/blank votes	594,659	8.55		
Total votes	6,956,900	100.00		
Registered voters/turnout	8,380,217	83.02		
Source: National Election Committee

== Reactions ==
The legitimacy of the 2018 elections was called into question by various commentators and media outlets. There were a record number of invalid ballots, accounting for 8.6% of the total votes cast, more than any votes received by a political party barring the CPP. Also, in areas away from the country's capital, voters claimed that CPP were using intimidation tactics in order to influence the elections' results.

Various international governments including Australia, Canada, the European Union, Japan and the United States dismissed the election results, and threatened to impose sanctions on Hun Sen's government.

The governments of China, the Philippines, Laos and Thailand were among those to congratulate the CPP on their victory. Meanwhile, the former opposition Cambodia National Rescue Party accused the National Election Committee of misleading the number of voter turnout.

== See also ==
- 6th National Assembly of Cambodia
