= Beehive Social Democratic Party =

Cambodian political party

Beehive Social Democratic Party គណបក្សសំបុកឃ្មុំសង្គមប្រជាធិបតេយ្យ
- Founder: Mam Sonando
- Founded: 2 July 2015
- Headquarters: No. 260 B, Street 16, Phumi Prek Toal, Sangkat Stueng Mean Chey, Khan Meanchey, Phnom Penh
- Ideology: Social democracy
- Political position: Centre-left
- Colours: Yellow; Green
- National Assembly: 0 / 125
- Senate: 0 / 62

The Beehive Social Democratic Party (BSDP; Khmer: គណបក្សសំបុកឃ្មុំសង្គមប្រជាធិបតេយ្យ) is a Cambodian political party founded in 2015 by Beehive Radio journalist Mam Sonando. The party came in seventh of twenty political parties in the 2018 general election.

== Recent electoral history ==
General election
Year	Party leader	Votes			Seats		Position	Government
Year	Party leader	#	%	±	#	±	Position	Government
2018	Mam Sonando	56,024	0.88	▲0.88	0 / 125	New	▲7th	CPP
2023	Mam Sonando	20,210	0.26	▼0.62	0 / 125	Steady	▼18th	CPP

Communal elections
Year	Party leader	Votes			Chiefs		Councillors		Position
Year	Party leader	#	%	±	#	±	#	±	Position
2017	Mam Sonando	31,334	0.45	▲0.45	0 / 1,646	New	1 / 11,572	▲1	▲6th
2022	Mam Sonando	2,409	0.03	▼0.42	0 / 1,652	Steady	TBD		▼12th
