= Khmer National United Party =

Cambodian political party

Khmer National United Party គណបក្សរួបរួមជាតិខ្មែរ
- Abbreviation: KNUP (English) ខ.រ.ជ (Khmer)
- Leader: Nhek Bun Chhay
- Founder: Nhek Bun Chhay
- Founded: February 2016
- Registered: 14 March 2016
- Split from: FUNCINPEC
- Headquarters: Phnom Penh, Cambodia
- Ideology: Royalism
- Slogan: "ឯករាជ្យភាព សន្តិភាព យុត្តិធម៌" ("Independence, Peace, Justice")
- Senate: 0 / 62
- National Assembly: 0 / 125
- Commune Chiefs: 1 / 1,646
- Commune Council: 24 / 11,572
- Provincial, municipal, town and district councillors: 1 / 4,114

Website
- https://www.knu-party.org (defunct)

The Khmer National United Party (KNUP; Khmer: គណបក្សខ្មែររួបរួមជាតិ, ខ.រ.ជ, UNGEGN: Keănăpăk Khmêr Ruŏbruŏm Chéat, K.R.C) is a Cambodian political party founded in February 2016 by Nhek Bun Chhay and former members of FUNCINPEC.

The party is open to legalizing same-sex marriage.

== Attempts at merging back into FUNCINPEC ==
On September 13 and 18, 2019, senior officials of the KNUP and FUNCINPEC began discussion to merge the KNUP back into FUNCINPEC. KNUP spokesman Run Meatra said that senior officials of FUNCINPEC and the KNUP agreed to a merger on December 23, but both never went through with the decision.

On September 22, 2021, both parties discussed merging ahead of the upcoming commune elections. KNUP president Nhek Bun Chhay announced another merger between the two party after they both negotiated several times and resolved their own internal issues. However, due to a controversy regarding the leadership of a united party, the decision to merge never went ahead.

== Recent electoral history ==
=== General election ===
Year	Party leader	Votes			Seats		Position	Government
Year	Party leader	#	%	±	#	±	Position	Government
2018	Nhek Bun Chhay	99,377	1.56%	New	0 / 125	New	5th	CPP
2023	Nhek Bun Chhay	134,285	1.73%	▲0.17	0 / 125	Steady	▲3rd	CPP

=== Communal elections ===
Year	Party leader	Votes			Chiefs		Councillors		Position
Year	Party leader	#	%	±	#	±	#	±	Position
2017	Nhek Bun Chhay	78,724	1.13	New	0 / 1,646	New	24 / 11,572	New	5th
2022	Nhek Bun Chhay	63,868	0.88	▼0.27	0 / 1,652	Steady	13 / 11,622	▼11	▲4th

=== Senate election ===
Year	Votes			Seats		Position
Year	#	%	±	#	±	Position
2018	182	1.56	New	0 / 62	New	3rd
