= Dharmacracy Party =

Political Party in Cambodia

Dharmacracy Party គណបក្សធម្មាធិបតេយ្យ
- Abbreviation: DP (2018-present); DWNP (1998-2018)
- President: Pothidey Savadey
- Registered: 9 April 1998; 26 years ago
- Headquarters: No.67, Samdech Sothearos Blvd, Sangkat Tonlé Bassac, Khan Chamkar Mon, Phnom Penh
- Ideology: Social democracy Buddhist democracy
- Religion: Theravada Buddhism
- Senate: 0 / 62
- National Assembly: 0 / 125

The Dharmacracy Party is a Cambodian political party founded and registered in 1998. Its president is Pothidey Savadey. It was formerly known as the Dharmacracy Women and Nation Party.
