= League for Democracy Party =

Cambodian political party

League for Democracy Party គណបក្សសម្ព័ន្ធដើម្បីប្រជាធិបតេយ្យ
- Abbreviation: LDP
- Leader: Khem Veasna
- Secretary-General: Chen Thon
- Vice President: Sorn Bophang
- Founded: 26 June 2006; 20 years ago
- Headquarters: 108 B2, St. 315, Sangkat Boeung Kak II, Khan Tuol Kouk, Phnom Penh, Cambodia
- Ideology: Social liberalism Progressivism; Third Way; Populism; Labor unionism Civil libertarianism Secularism
- Slogan: "រួមគិត រួមធ្វើ រួមទទួលខុសត្រូវ" (English: "Think Together, Act Together, Be Responsible Together")
- National Assembly: 0 / 125
- Senate: 0 / 62
- Commune Council: 4 / 11,572

Website
- www.camldp.org

The League for Democracy Party (LDP; Khmer: គណបក្សសម្ព័ន្ធដើម្បីប្រជាធិបតេយ្យ) is a Cambodian political party which was formed on 15 July 2005. The party itself, however, was established on 26 June 2006. Its leader is Khem Veasna. Its stated goal is to have "A Nation in Which We Live in Equity As Its Owner." Its main mission is to implement the party's "eight Mechanisms" as legal instruments to "reduce the power of the government and bring power back to the citizens."

== History ==
The League for Democracy Party (LDP) was formed on 15 July 2005 by a small group of people who had similar ideas and perceptions to solve Cambodia's social and political issues.

The founders filed the procedure to establish the League for Democracy Party in accordance with the law and regulations relating to the establishment of political parties. The LDP was recognized, established, and registered officially with the announcement of the Ministry of Interior, 792 ប្រ.ក. Dated 26 June 2006.

=== The 2nd LDP Ordinary Congress ===
Some 5,000 supporters turned out for the congress of the League for Democracy Party in Phnom Penh on Koh Pich (Diamond Island).

Khem Veasna, a former member of the Sam Rainsy Party who founded LDP in 2005, was again endorsed as its leader.

In the 2012 commune council election, LDP won eight commune council seats. This was minor, however, compared to the seats gained by the major parties; from the CPP's 8,000 seats down to the Norodom Ranariddh Party's 52. LDP's tally nonetheless set it apart from the other small parties, all of which won at most one seat."

The party has been steadily growing since it was founded in 2005 and is standing for 2017 election in 844 communes – more than half of the Kingdom’s total 1,646.

== Political ideology ==
The party is considered left wing in its view since it believes that "all" Cambodians must live equally under the laws, as asserted in the party's common dream: "A nation in which we live in equity as its owners".

The ruling establishment has been enjoying their chic lifestyle above the laws, which has created all sorts of problems Cambodia faces today. The main solution to the problems is to decentralize all the powers that have long been consolidated by the ruling party. This is to unburden the works of the top leadership of the nation and create new responsibilities for lower levels of the administrative system, which are to be directly elected by the people.

— Khem Veasna

== The eight political mechanisms ==
The aim of the eight mechanisms as stated by the party are to "reduce, limit, and monitor the power of governments at all levels, whereby the citizens, through unity, maintain control of the governments".

- The term of office of the Prime Minister shall be limited by 2 terms (5 years per term) : This prevent authoritarianism, despotism, or totalitarianism government that gives to exploitation, corruption, and nepotism that greatly affects society and ultimately lead to a failed state.
- Prime Minister or any high ranking government officials shall not be allowed to form his/her own security team or bodyguards: The personal formation of security team can then assimilate to the formation of ambitious self-serving arm-force that can lead to an authoritarian power struggle. Therefore, it does not serve the interest of the citizens.
- The Prime Minister shall temporarily make residency, during his/her terms in the executive office, provided by the government of the people: This is a security measure to safeguard the Prime Minister and immediate family while serving the nation.
- Create an administration court.
- The role and function as well as the promotion of generals in the military and police should be approved by the Parliament.
- The Government Official should be neutral.
- There must be people's representation or elected representative at all levels of governments (Commune/Sangkat, District/Khan and Province/City) The representation is to serve the people's voices.
- Using of uninominal system to elect the members of Parliament.

== General election results ==
Election	Leader	Votes			Seats		Position	Government
Election	Leader	#	%	±	#	±	Position	Government
2008	Khem Veasna	68,389	1.0	▲1.0	00 / 123	Steady	▲6th	CPP–FUNCINPEC
2013	Khem Veasna	68,909	1.0	Steady	00 / 123	Steady	▲4th	CPP
2018	Khem Veasna	309,364	4.9	▲3.8	00 / 125	Steady	▲3rd	CPP
