= National Election Committee =

- គណៈកម្មាធិការជាតិរៀបចំការបោះឆ្នោត
- NEC logo

Committee overview
- Formed: 19 December 1997
- Jurisdiction: Cambodia
- Headquarters: 275 Norodom Blvd, Phnom Penh, Cambodia 12301
- Annual budget: $21,000,000 (2013)
- Committee executive: Prach Chan, Chairman
- Website: nec.gov.kh

The National Election Committee (NEC; Khmer: គណៈកម្មាធិការជាតិរៀបចំការបោះឆ្នោត, romanized: knkammeathikear cheate riebcham karbaochhnaot, គ.ជ.ប., KChB) is an independent agency that supervises the national elections of Cambodia.

Its official motto is "Independence, Neutrality, Truthfulness, Justice and Transparency".

== Members ==
Name	Position	Party
Sik Bun Hok	Chairman	CPP
Mean Satik	Member	CPP
Duch Sorn	Member	CPP
Hing Thirith	Member	CNRP
Em Sophath	Member	CPP
Hang Puthea	Member	Neutral

== Criticism ==
The opposition Cambodian National Rescue Party (CNRP) accused the NEC of committing corruption and affiliated with the ruling Cambodian People's Party. In November 2017, Kuoy Bunroeun, Rong Chhun and Te Manirong of the NEC resigned in protest against the dissolution of the CNRP and the reassignment of its parliamentary seats to minor parties.
