= Commune Council (Cambodia) =

Results of the 2017 commune elections: CPP: 6,503 seats CNRP: 5,007 seats FUNCINPEC: 28 seats KNUP: 24 seats GDP: 5 seats LDP: 4 seats BSDP: 1 seat

There are 1,646 communes (khums/sangkats) in Cambodia. Each Commune Council (Khmer: ក្រុមប្រឹក្សាឃុំសង្កាត់) is composed of 5 to 11 members depending on demography and geography, elected through a proportional system where nationally registered political parties can compete by presenting a list of candidates of at least twice the number of seats in each Commune. There are no independent candidates. Commune councillors vote on their constituents' behalf in Senate elections. As such, a victory in communal elections would all but guarantee a majority in the Senate.

There are currently 11,572 councillors from 1,646 communes.

Party	Councillors	Of total
Cambodian People's Party	11,510	99.46%
FUNCINPEC	28	0.24%
Khmer National United Party	24	0.21%
Grassroots Democracy Party	5	0.04%
League for Democracy Party	4	0.03%
Beehive Social Democratic Party	1	0.01%
Total	11,572	100%

== Related external links ==
- Official Results of the 2007 Commune Councils Election
- National Election Committee
- 2007 COMMUNE COUNCIL ELECTION CALENDAR (PDF)
- Promoting Women's Participation In Decision Making At the commune level in Cambodia - by the World Bank (PDF)
