= 3rd National Assembly of Cambodia =

←	2nd	4th	→

Overview
- Jurisdiction: Cambodia
- Term: 27 September 2003 – 27 July 2008
- Election: 27 July 2003

National Assembly
- Members: 123
- President: Norodom Ranariddh (2003–06); Heng Samrin (2006–08)
- First Vice President: Heng Samrin (2003–06); Nguon Nhel (2006–08)
- Second Vice President: Nguon Nhel (2003–06); Say Chhum (2006–08)
- Prime Minister: Hun Sen
- Party control: Cambodian People's Party

Members of the third National Assembly (Khmer: រដ្ឋសភាអាណត្តិទី៣) were elected on 27 July 2003.

== Composition ==
Party	MPs	Of total
Cambodian People's Party	73	59.35%
FUNCINPEC	26	21.14%
Sam Rainsy Party	24	19.51%
Total	123	100%

== List of members ==
Cambodian People's Party
FUNCINPEC
Sam Rainsy Party

Constituency	Seats	Members
Banteay	6	Yim Chhaily
Banteay	6	Vong Kan
Banteay	6	Pal Sam Oeun
Banteay	6	Try Chheang Huot
Banteay	6	Kimsour Phirith
Banteay	6	Nheb Bunchin
Battambang	8	Sar Kheng
Battambang	8	Nim Thot
Battambang	8	Ngin Khorn
Battambang	8	Ly Kim Leang
Battambang	8	Dul Koeun
Battambang	8	Eng Chhai Eang
Battambang	8	Toan Vanthara
Battambang	8	Nhek Bun Chhay
Kampong Cham	18	Heng Samrin
Kampong Cham	18	Math Ly
Kampong Cham	18	Hor Namhong
Kampong Cham	18	Chhor Leang Huot
Kampong Cham	18	Khieu Kanharith
Kampong Cham	18	Im Sothy
Kampong Cham	18	Yos Son
Kampong Cham	18	Ith Prang
Kampong Cham	18	Norodom Ranariddh
Kampong Cham	18	You Hockry
Kampong Cham	18	Chhim Siek Leng
Kampong Cham	18	Kong Vibol
Kampong Cham	18	Monh Saphan
Kampong Cham	18	Sam Rainsy
Kampong Cham	18	Mao Monyvann
Kampong Cham	18	Thak Lany
Kampong Cham	18	Cheam Channy
Kampong Cham	18	Amath Yashya
Kampong Chhnang	4	Kong Sam Ol
Kampong Chhnang	4	Ouk Rabun
Kampong Chhnang	4	Tram Iv Tek
Kampong Chhnang	4	Sok San
Kampong Speu	6	Say Chhum
Kampong Speu	6	Hem Khan
Kampong Speu	6	Ly Son
Kampong Speu	6	Samrith Pech
Kampong Speu	6	Nuth Rumduol
Kampong Speu	6	Lu Laysreng
Kampong Thom	6	Nguon Nhel
Kampong Thom	6	Un Neung
Kampong Thom	6	Thong Khon
Kampong Thom	6	Poa Try
Kampong Thom	6	Sok Pheng
Kampong Thom	6	Poa Bun Sreu
Kampot	6	Ney Pena
Kampot	6	Chay Saing Yun
Kampot	6	Som Kimsuor
Kampot	6	Than Sina
Kampot	6	Mam Bun Neang
Kampot	6	Kieng Vang
Kandal	11	Hun Sen
Kandal	11	Tep Ngorn
Kandal	11	Chhay Than
Kandal	11	Mom Chim Huy
Kandal	11	Ho Non
Kandal	11	Chan Cheng
Kandal	11	Chrea Sochenda
Kandal	11	Ngor Sovann
Kandal	11	Norodom Sirivudh
Kandal	11	Hong Sun Huot
Kandal	11	Sun Chanthol
Koh Kong	1	Ay Khorn
Kratié	3	Im Chhun Lim
Kratié	3	Chhan Saphan
Kratié	3	Norodom Rattana Devi
Mondulkiri	1	Rath Sarem
Phnom Penh	12	Tioulong Saumura
Phnom Penh	12	Yim Sovann
Phnom Penh	12	Son Chhay
Phnom Penh	12	Keo Remy
Phnom Penh	12	Ho Vann
Phnom Penh	12	Sok Soty
Phnom Penh	12	Chea Sim
Phnom Penh	12	Sim Ka
Phnom Penh	12	Keat Chhon
Phnom Penh	12	Um Nhanh
Phnom Penh	12	Norodom Vichara
Phnom Penh	12	Khy Taing Lim
Preah Vihear	1	Suk Sam Eng
Prey Veng	11	Chea Soth
Prey Veng	11	Nhim Vanda
Prey Veng	11	Cheam Yeab
Prey Veng	11	Ek Sam Ol
Prey Veng	11	Pen Panha
Prey Veng	11	Min Sean
Prey Veng	11	Veng Sereyvuth
Prey Veng	11	Kuoch Ky
Prey Veng	11	Sisowath Santha
Prey Veng	11	Chea Poch
Prey Veng	11	Khem Veasna
Pursat	4	Suy Sem
Pursat	4	Chin Bun Sean
Pursat	4	Mey Norn
Pursat	4	Ly Thuch
Ratankiri	1	Bou Thang
Siem Reap	6	Tea Banh
Siem Reap	6	Cham Prasidh
Siem Reap	6	Sieng Nam
Siem Reap	6	Keo Saphal
Siem Reap	6	Pou Sohtireak
Siem Reap	6	Ke Sovannaroth
Sihanoukville	1	Suos Kanan
Stung Treng	1	Sorn Inthor
Svay Rieng	5	Men Sam An
Svay Rieng	5	Him Chhem
Svay Rieng	5	Hul Savorn
Svay Rieng	5	Duong Vanna
Svay Rieng	5	Khun Haing
Takéo	8	Sok An
Takéo	8	So Khun
Takéo	8	Mok Mareth
Takéo	8	Chan Sarun
Takéo	8	Nin Saphon
Takéo	8	Keo Saphal
Takéo	8	Khek Vandy
Takéo	8	Kuoy Bunroeun
Kep	1	Kea Sahorn
Pailin	1	Y Chhean
Oddar Meanchey Province	1	Nou Sam
Total	123	

Source: National Election Committee (archive)
