= 4th National Assembly of Cambodia =

←	3rd	5th	→

Overview
- Jurisdiction: Cambodia
- Term: 24 September 2008 – 28 July 2013
- Election: 27 July 2008

National Assembly
- Members: 123
- President: Heng Samrin
- First Vice President: Nguon Nhel
- Second Vice President: Say Chhum (2008–12); Khuon Sodary (2012–13)
- Head of government: Hun Sen
- Party control: Cambodian People's Party

Members of the fourth National Assembly (Khmer: រដ្ឋសភាអាណត្តិទី ៤) were elected on 27 July 2008. The Cambodian People's Party (CPP) was the largest party with 90 of 123 seats. With five parties, it is the most multi-partisan Assembly.

== Composition ==
Party	MPs	Of total
Cambodian People's Party	90	73.17%
Sam Rainsy Party	26	21.14%
Human Rights Party	3	2.44%
Norodom Ranariddh Party	2	1.63%
FUNCINPEC	2	1.63%
Total	123	100%

== List of members ==
Cambodian People's Party
Sam Rainsy Party
Human Rights Party
Norodom Ranariddh Party
FUNCINPEC

Constituency	Seats	Members
Banteay	6	Yim Chhaily
Banteay	6	Pal Sam Oeun
Banteay	6	An Sum
Banteay	6	Try Chheang Huot
Banteay	6	Yont Tharo
Banteay	6	Nhek Bun Chhay
Battambang	8	Sar Kheng
Battambang	8	Chheang Vun
Battambang	8	Ly Kim Leang
Battambang	8	Chuonh Sochhay
Battambang	8	Tes Heanh
Battambang	8	Muy Chat
Battambang	8	Eng Chhai Eang
Battambang	8	Chiv Cata
Kampong Cham	18	Heng Samrin
Kampong Cham	18	Hor Namhong
Kampong Cham	18	Yos Son
Kampong Cham	18	Chin Kimsreng
Kampong Cham	18	Van Sengly
Kampong Cham	18	Khek Sam On
Kampong Cham	18	Chem Savay
Kampong Cham	18	Im Run
Kampong Cham	18	Chay Borin
Kampong Cham	18	Tres Sarom
Kampong Cham	18	Nguon Sim An
Kampong Cham	18	Sam Rainsy
Kampong Cham	18	Mao Monyvann
Kampong Cham	18	Cheam Channy
Kampong Cham	18	Thak Lany
Kampong Cham	18	Kimsour Phirith
Kampong Cham	18	Kem Sokha
Kampong Cham	18	You Hockry
Kampong Chhnang	4	Kong Sam Ol
Kampong Chhnang	4	Keo Sosak
Kampong Chhnang	4	Ker Chanmony
Kampong Chhnang	4	Khy Vandeth
Kampong Speu	6	Say Chhum
Kampong Speu	6	Hem Khan
Kampong Speu	6	Ly Son
Kampong Speu	6	Samrith Pech
Kampong Speu	6	Im Savoeun
Kampong Speu	6	Nuth Rumduol
Kampong Thom	6	Nguon Nhel
Kampong Thom	6	Un Neung
Kampong Thom	6	Nhem Thavy
Kampong Thom	6	Sik Bun Hok
Kampong Thom	6	Men Sothavarin
Kampong Thom	6	Kuch Moly
Kampot	6	Ney Pena
Kampot	6	Som Kimsuor
Kampot	6	Som Chen
Kampot	6	Nim Chantara
Kampot	6	Saleh Sen
Kampot	6	Mu Sochua
Kandal	11	Hun Sen
Kandal	11	Mom Chim Huy
Kandal	11	Ho Non
Kandal	11	Khuon Sodary
Kandal	11	Zakaryya Adam
Kandal	11	Ouk Damry
Kandal	11	Chea Chamroeun
Kandal	11	Chan Cheng
Kandal	11	Khim Laky
Kandal	11	Pot Peou
Kandal	11	Ou Chanrith
Koh Kong	1	Ay Khorn
Kratié	3	Troeung Thavy
Kratié	3	Katoe Toyab
Kratié	3	Long Ry
Mondulkiri	1	Rath Sarem
Phnom Penh	12	Chea Soth
Phnom Penh	12	Keat Chhon
Phnom Penh	12	Um Nhanh
Phnom Penh	12	Hou Sry
Phnom Penh	12	Krouch Sam An
Phnom Penh	12	Lork Kheng
Phnom Penh	12	Chiep Sivorn
Phnom Penh	12	Tioulong Saumura
Phnom Penh	12	Yim Sovann
Phnom Penh	12	Son Chhay
Phnom Penh	12	Ho Vann
Phnom Penh	12	Ly Srey Vyna
Preah Vihear	1	Suk Sam Eng
Prey Veng	11	Cheam Yeab
Prey Veng	11	Bin Chhin
Prey Veng	11	Pen Panha
Prey Veng	11	Nhim Vanda
Prey Veng	11	Long Sakhan
Prey Veng	11	Sok Eysan
Prey Veng	11	Min Sean
Prey Veng	11	Chea Poch
Prey Veng	11	Kong Bora
Prey Veng	11	Yem Ponhearith
Prey Veng	11	Sao Rany
Pursat	4	Ly Narun
Pursat	4	Sman Teath
Pursat	4	Em Ponna
Pursat	4	Sary Kosal
Ratankiri	1	Bou Thang
Siem Reap	6	Tea Banh
Siem Reap	6	Sieng Nam
Siem Reap	6	Peou Savoeun
Siem Reap	6	Sam Heang
Siem Reap	6	Chhim Ma
Siem Reap	6	Ke Sovannaroth
Sihanoukville	1	Suos Kanan
Stung Treng	1	Sorn Inthor
Svay Rieng	5	Men Sam An
Svay Rieng	5	Hul Savorn
Svay Rieng	5	Duong Vanna
Svay Rieng	5	Chhun Sarim
Svay Rieng	5	Sao Leng
Takéo	8	Sok An
Takéo	8	Nin Saphon
Takéo	8	Prak Thuch
Takéo	8	Chau Sophon
Takéo	8	Yean Hunly
Takéo	8	Um Sokhan
Takéo	8	Kuoy Bunroeun
Takéo	8	Tok Vanchan
Kep	1	An He
Pailin	1	Ich Sarou
Oddar Meanchey Province	1	Nou Sam
Total	123	
