= 5th National Assembly of Cambodia =

←	4th	6th	→

Overview
- Jurisdiction: Cambodia
- Term: 23 September 2013 – 29 July 2018
- Election: 28 July 2013

National Assembly
- Members: 123
- President: Heng Samrin
- First Vice President: Nguon Nhel (2013–14); Kem Sokha (2014–15); Vacant (2015–17); You Hockry (2017–18)
- Second Vice President: Khuon Sodary (2013–14); Nguon Nhel (2014–18)
- Head of government: Hun Sen
- Leader of the Opposition: Sam Rainsy (2015); Kem Sokha (2015–17)
- Party control: Cambodian People's Party

Members of the fifth National Assembly (Khmer: រដ្ឋសភាអាណត្តិទី៥) were elected on 28 July 2013. The Cambodian People's Party (CPP) won 68 seats, while the remaining 55 seats were won by the Cambodia National Rescue Party (CNRP). It is notable for being the first two-party Assembly.

== Composition ==
=== 2013–2017 ===
Party	MPs	Of total
Cambodian People's Party	68	55.28%
Cambodia National Rescue Party	55	44.72%
Total	123	100%

=== 2017–2018 ===
Party	MPs	Of total
Cambodian People's Party	123	100%
Total	123	100%

== List of members ==
Cambodian People's Party
Cambodia National Rescue Party
Note: List only includes elected members.

Constituency	Seats	Members
Banteay	6	Ke Kim Yan
Banteay	6	Yim Chhaily
Banteay	6	Pal Sam Oeun
Banteay	6	Nuom Sophorn
Banteay	6	Long Ry
Banteay	6	Yont Tharo
Battambang	8	Sar Kheng
Battambang	8	Ngin Khorn
Battambang	8	Ly Kim Leang
Battambang	8	Chheang Vun
Battambang	8	Lauk Hour
Battambang	8	Mu Sochua
Battambang	8	Long Butha
Battambang	8	Pin Rathana
Kampong Cham	18	Kem Sokha
Kampong Cham	18	Kuoy Bunroeun
Kampong Cham	18	Mao Monyvann
Kampong Cham	18	Vann Narith
Kampong Cham	18	Tuon Yokda
Kampong Cham	18	Kimsour Phirith
Kampong Cham	18	Ouch Serey Yuth
Kampong Cham	18	Nhay Chamroeun
Kampong Cham	18	Chiv Cata
Kampong Cham	18	Kong Kimhak
Kampong Cham	18	Heng Samrin
Kampong Cham	18	Hor Namhong
Kampong Cham	18	Hun Neng
Kampong Cham	18	Im Sothy
Kampong Cham	18	Chay Borin
Kampong Cham	18	Chem Savay
Kampong Cham	18	Nguon Sim An
Kampong Cham	18	Men Kon
Kampong Chhnang	4	Kong Sam Ol
Kampong Chhnang	4	Ke Chanmony
Kampong Chhnang	4	Ky Vandara
Kampong Chhnang	4	Ngor Kimcheang
Kampong Speu	6	Pen Sovan
Kampong Speu	6	Nuth Rumduol
Kampong Speu	6	Sok Oumsea
Kampong Speu	6	Korng Heang
Kampong Speu	6	Hun Many
Kampong Speu	6	Hem Khorn
Kampong Thom	6	Nguon Nhel
Kampong Thom	6	Nhem Thavy
Kampong Thom	6	Sik Bunhok
Kampong Thom	6	Men Sothavarin
Kampong Thom	6	Cheam Channy
Kampong Thom	6	Lim Kimya
Kampot	6	Soam Chin
Kampot	6	Nim Chandara
Kampot	6	Un Sokunthea
Kampot	6	Chea Poch
Kampot	6	Lim Bunsidareth
Kampot	6	Van Samoeun
Kandal	11	Eng Chhai Eang
Kandal	11	Ou Chanrith
Kandal	11	Chan Cheng
Kandal	11	To Vannchan
Kandal	11	Pot Peou
Kandal	11	Te Chanmony
Kandal	11	Hun Sen
Kandal	11	Khuon Sodary
Kandal	11	Mom Chim Huy
Kandal	11	Ho Non
Kandal	11	Chhun Sirun
Koh Kong	1	Ay Khorn
Kratié	3	Troeung Thavy
Kratié	3	Sun Saphoeun
Kratié	3	Keo Phirom
Mondulkiri	1	Chan Yoeun
Phnom Penh	12	Tioulong Saumura
Phnom Penh	12	Yim Sovann
Phnom Penh	12	Son Chhay
Phnom Penh	12	Ho Vann
Phnom Penh	12	Keo Sambath
Phnom Penh	12	Ly Srey Vyna
Phnom Penh	12	Dam Sith
Phnom Penh	12	Keat Chhon
Phnom Penh	12	Kep Chuktema
Phnom Penh	12	Hou Sry
Phnom Penh	12	Krouch Sam An
Phnom Penh	12	Lork Kheng
Preah Vihear	1	Suos Yara
Prey Veng	11	Yem Ponhearith
Prey Veng	11	Heng Danaro
Prey Veng	11	Kong Bora
Prey Veng	11	Tout Khoeuth
Prey Veng	11	Lat Lithey
Prey Veng	11	Long Bunny
Prey Veng	11	Bin Chhin
Prey Veng	11	Cheam Yeab
Prey Veng	11	Pen Panha
Prey Veng	11	Sar Sokha
Prey Veng	11	Sok Eysan
Pursat	4	Suy Sem
Pursat	4	Tan Kimven
Pursat	4	Em Ponna
Pursat	4	Ngim Nheng
Ratankiri	1	Bou Lam
Siem Reap	6	Tea Banh
Siem Reap	6	Seang Nam
Siem Reap	6	Chhim Ma
Siem Reap	6	Peou Savoeun
Siem Reap	6	Ke Sovannaroth
Siem Reap	6	Oum Saman
Sihanoukville	1	Chev Kimheng
Stung Treng	1	Loy Sophat
Svay Rieng	5	Men Sam An
Svay Rieng	5	Chhun Sarim
Svay Rieng	5	Duong Vanna
Svay Rieng	5	Riel Khemarin
Svay Rieng	5	Kong Saphea
Takéo	8	Sok An
Takéo	8	Nin Saphon
Takéo	8	Mok Mareth
Takéo	8	So Khun
Takéo	8	Pol Hom
Takéo	8	Khy Vandeth
Takéo	8	Ou Chanrath
Takéo	8	Tep Sothy
Kep	1	An He
Pailin	1	Ban Sreymom
Oddar Meanchey Province	1	Nou Sam
Total	123	
