= 6th National Assembly of Cambodia =

←	5th	7th	→
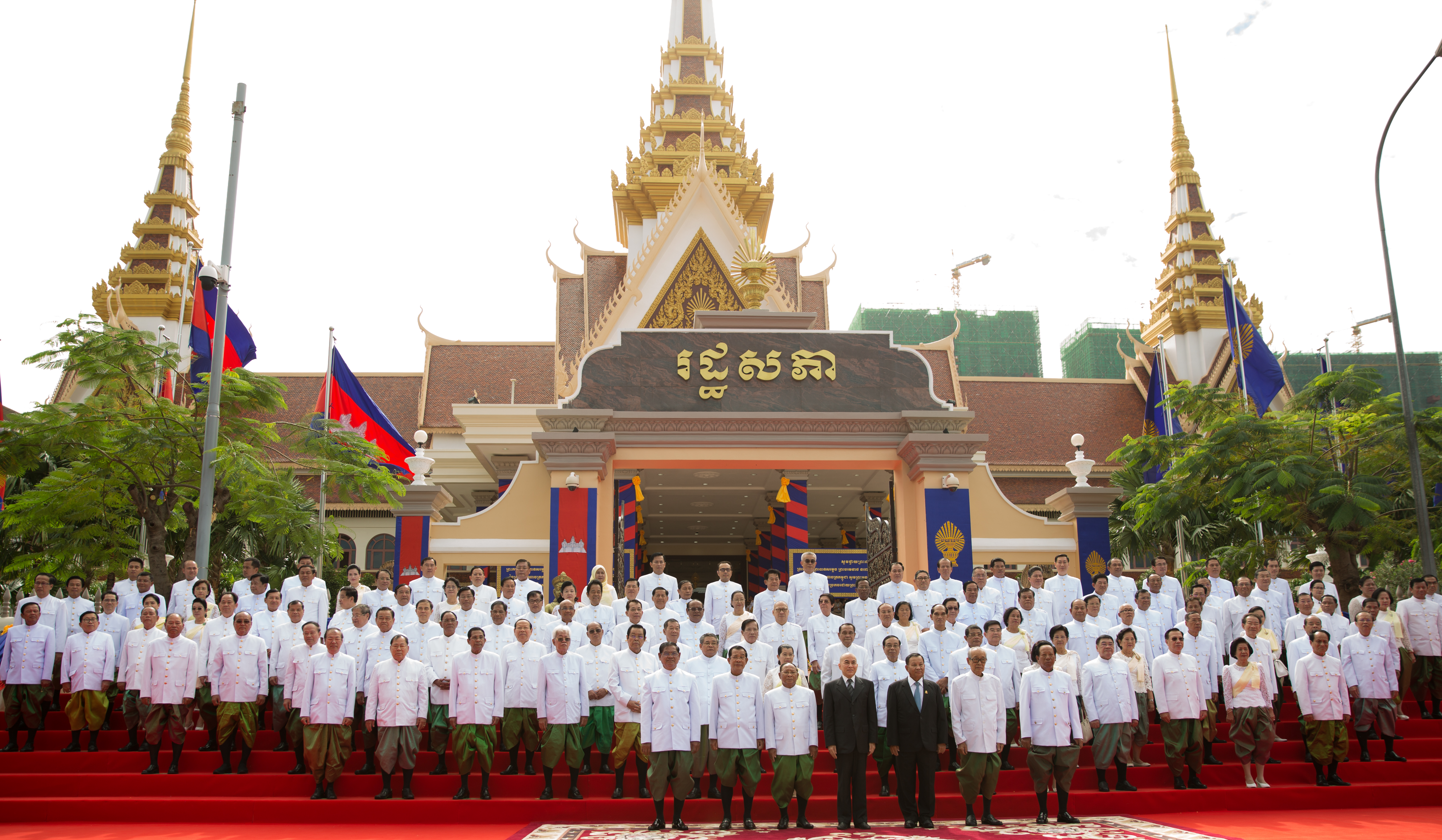

Overview
- Jurisdiction: Cambodia
- Term: 5 September 2018 – present
- Election: 29 July 2018

National Assembly
- Members: 125
- President: Heng Samrin
- First Vice President: Nguon Nhel
- Second Vice President: Khuon Sodary
- Head of government: Hun Sen
- Party control: Cambodian People's Party

Members of the sixth National Assembly (Khmer: រដ្ឋសភាអាណត្តិទី៦) were elected on 29 July 2018. The number of seats increased to 125, with Sihanoukville Province gaining two additional seats. All 125 members are solely from the Cambodian People's Party, following their landslide victory. It is the first single-party assembly since 1981, and the first since the current constitution was adopted in 1993.

== Composition ==
Party	MPs	Of total
Cambodian People's Party	125	100%
Total	125	100%

== List of members ==
Cambodian People's Party

Constituency	Seats	Members
Banteay Meanchey	6	Ke Kim Yan
Banteay Meanchey	6	Kousoum Saroeuth
Banteay Meanchey	6	Pal Sam Oeun
Banteay Meanchey	6	Nuom Sophorn
Banteay Meanchey	6	Serey Kosal
Banteay Meanchey	6	Y Long
Battambang	8	Sar Kheng
Battambang	8	Lork Hour
Battambang	8	Ngin Khorn
Battambang	8	Chan Sophal
Battambang	8	Ang Vong Vathana
Battambang	8	Sak Setha
Battambang	8	Chheang Vun
Battambang	8	Ly Kim Leang
Kampong Cham	10	Yim Chhaily
Kampong Cham	10	Hun Neng
Kampong Cham	10	Khieu Kanharith
Kampong Cham	10	Hang Chuon Naron
Kampong Cham	10	Veng Sakhon
Kampong Cham	10	Pan Sorasak
Kampong Cham	10	Lun Lim Thai
Kampong Cham	10	Lou Kim Chhun
Kampong Cham	10	Nguon Socheat
Kampong Cham	10	Nguon Sim An
Kampong Chhnang	4	Kong Sam Ol
Kampong Chhnang	4	Ouk Rabun
Kampong Chhnang	4	Tram Iv Tek
Kampong Chhnang	4	Kob Mariyas
Kampong Speu	6	Chhay Than
Kampong Speu	6	Hun Many
Kampong Speu	6	Satya Vuth
Kampong Speu	6	Sok Born
Kampong Speu	6	Kheng Somvada
Kampong Speu	6	Rin Virak
Kampong Thom	6	Nguon Nhel
Kampong Thom	6	Thong Khon
Kampong Thom	6	Chea Oeung
Kampong Thom	6	Yim Leat
Kampong Thom	6	Kheoung Nupheap
Kampong Thom	6	Norng Veasna
Kampot	6	Pen Simon
Kampot	6	Soam Chin
Kampot	6	Un Sokunthea
Kampot	6	Nim Chandara
Kampot	6	Kieng Vang
Kampot	6	Math Set
Kandal	11	Hun Sen
Kandal	11	Khuon Sodary
Kandal	11	Prak Sokhonn
Kandal	11	Aun Pornmoniroth
Kandal	11	Lim Kean Hor
Kandal	11	Sun Chanthol
Kandal	11	Dul Koeun
Kandal	11	Sok Chendasophea
Kandal	11	Chhun Sirun
Kandal	11	Vongsey Vissoth
Kandal	11	Zakaryya Adam
Koh Kong	1	Dom Yuhean
Kratié	3	Pich Bunthin
Kratié	3	Sar Chamrong
Kratié	3	Troeung Thavy
Mondulkiri	1	Chan Yoeun
Phnom Penh	12	Pa Socheatvong
Phnom Penh	12	Ith Sam Heng
Phnom Penh	12	Mam Bunheng
Phnom Penh	12	Ing Kuntha Phavi
Phnom Penh	12	Kep Chuktema
Phnom Penh	12	Hou Sry
Phnom Penh	12	Krouch Sam An
Phnom Penh	12	Lork Kheng
Phnom Penh	12	Osman Hassan
Phnom Penh	12	Cheab Sivorn
Phnom Penh	12	Pich Kimsreang
Phnom Penh	12	Ly Chheng
Preah Vihear	1	Suos Yara
Prey Veng	11	Cheam Yeab
Prey Veng	11	Pen Panha
Prey Veng	11	Prum Sokha
Prey Veng	11	Sar Sokha
Prey Veng	11	Mom Sibun
Prey Veng	11	Long Bunny
Prey Veng	11	Nhim Vanda
Prey Veng	11	He Bavy
Prey Veng	11	Sborng Sarath
Prey Veng	11	Kong Salorn
Prey Veng	11	Pov Samy
Pursat	4	Suy Sem
Pursat	4	Keo Ratanak
Pursat	4	Ty Norin
Pursat	4	Em Ponna
Ratankiri	1	Bou Lam
Siem Reap	6	Tea Banh
Siem Reap	6	Seang Nam
Siem Reap	6	Chhim Ma
Siem Reap	6	Peou Savoeun
Siem Reap	6	Nou Phalla
Siem Reap	6	Yin Kimsean
Sihanoukville	3	Pol Saroeun
Sihanoukville	3	Kim Sithorn
Sihanoukville	3	Chev Kimheng
Stung Treng	1	Loy Sophat
Svay Rieng	5	Men Sam An
Svay Rieng	5	Duong Vanna
Svay Rieng	5	Chey Son
Svay Rieng	5	Chhun Sarim
Svay Rieng	5	Pov Sopheap
Takéo	8	Bin Chhin
Takéo	8	Nin Saphon
Takéo	8	Mok Mareth
Takéo	8	Sok Sokan
Takéo	8	Chea Vandeth
Takéo	8	Sou Phirin
Takéo	8	Chan Sarun
Takéo	8	Sok Pheng
Kep	1	Cham Prasidh
Pailin	1	Ban Sreymom
Oddar Meanchey	1	Kun Kim
Tboung Khmum	8	Heng Samrin
Tboung Khmum	8	Chea Sophara
Tboung Khmum	8	Vong Soth
Tboung Khmum	8	Say Sam Al
Tboung Khmum	8	Chay Borin
Tboung Khmum	8	Keo Piseth
Tboung Khmum	8	Prach Chan
Tboung Khmum	8	Mot Yusoh
Total	125	

Source: National Election Committee
