= Kandal (National Assembly constituency) =

Constituency in the National Assembly of Cambodia

- Constituency for the National Assembly
- Province: Kandal
- Population: 1,162,208
- Electorate: 732,572

Current constituency
- Created: 1993
- Seats: 11
- Members: Hun Sen; Khuon Sodary; Prak Sokhonn; Aun Pornmoniroth; Lim Kean Hor; Sun Chanthol; Dol Koeun; Sok Chendasorphea; Chhun Sirun; Vongsey Vissoth; Zakaryya Adam

Kandal (Khmer: មណ្ឌលខេត្តកណ្តាល) is one of the 25 constituencies of the National Assembly of Cambodia. It is allocated 11 seats in the National Assembly.

== MPs ==
Election	MP (Party)	MP (Party)	MP (Party)	MP (Party)	MP (Party)	MP (Party)	MP (Party)	MP (Party)	MP (Party)	MP (Party)	MP (Party)
1993	Mom Chim Huy (CPP)	Heng Samrin (CPP)	Chea Soth (CPP)	Mea Chanleap (BLDP)	Ung Keat (FUNCINPEC)	Ung Huot (FUNCINPEC)	Kan Morn (FUNCINPEC)	Hing Sarin (FUNCINPEC)	Seng Tong (FUNCINPEC)	Pin Dam (FUNCINPEC)	Soam Chanboth (FUNCINPEC)
1998	Mom Chim Huy (CPP)	Khuon Sodary (CPP)	Hun Sen (CPP)	Ho Non (CPP)	Khlok Buthdy (FUNCINPEC)	Yim Sokha (Rainsy)	Chea Chan Sarin (FUNCINPEC)	Dean Del (FUNCINPEC)	Sam Sundoeun (Rainsy)	Nuth Sokhom (FUNCINPEC)	Hong Sun Huot (FUNCINPEC)
2003	Mom Chim Huy (CPP)	Khuon Sodary (CPP)	Hun Sen (CPP)	Ho Non (CPP)	Tep Ngorn (CPP)	Chan Cheng (Rainsy)	Chhay Than (CPP)	Chrea Sochenda (Rainsy)	Ngor Sovann (Rainsy)	Sun Chanthol (FUNCINPEC)	Hong Sun Huot (FUNCINPEC)
2008	Mom Chim Huy (CPP)	Khuon Sodary (CPP)	Hun Sen (CPP)	Ho Non (CPP)	Zakaryya Adam (CPP)	Chan Cheng (Rainsy)	Ouk Damry (CPP)	Pot Peou (Rainsy)	Khim Laky (Rainsy)	Chea Chamroeun (CPP)	Ou Chanrith (HRP)/ (Rainsy)
2013	Mom Chim Huy (CPP)	Khuon Sodary (CPP)	Hun Sen (CPP)	Ho Non (CPP)	Chhun Sirun (CPP)	Chan Cheng (Rainsy)	Eng Chhai Eang (Rainsy)	Pot Peou (Rainsy)	To Vannchan (Rainsy)	Te Chanmony (Rainsy)	Ou Chanrith (HRP)/ (Rainsy)
2018	Prak Sokhonn (CPP)	Khuon Sodary (CPP)	Hun Sen (CPP)	Zakaryya Adam (CPP)	Chhun Sirun (CPP)	Sun Chanthol (CPP)	Aun Pornmoniroth (CPP)	Lim Kean Hor (CPP)	Dul Koeun (CPP)	Sok Chendasophea (CPP)	Vongsey Vissoth (CPP)

== Election results ==
Party	Votes	%	Seats	+/–
Cambodian People's Party	449,748	80.24	11	+5
League for Democracy Party	27,495	4.91	0	0
FUNCINPEC	23,226	4.14	0	0
Khmer Will Party	15,474	2.76	0	New
Beehive Social Democratic Party	8,462	1.51	0	New
Khmer National United Party	4,609	0.82	0	New
Cambodian Nationality Party	4,546	0.81	0	0
Khmer Anti-Poverty Party	4,265	0.76	0	0
Grassroots Democracy Party	4,264	0.76	0	New
Khmer Rise Party	3,724	0.66	0	New
Khmer United Party	3,662	0.65	0	New
Dharmacracy Party	3,136	0.56	0	New
Cambodian Youth Party	2,467	0.44	0	New
Khmer Economic Development Party	2,171	0.39	0	0
Ponleu Thmey Party	819	0.15	0	New
Reaksmey Khemara Party	751	0.13	0	New
Invalid/blank votes	71,743	–	–	–
Total	632,251	100	11	0
Registered voters/turnout	732,572	86.31	–	–
Source: National Election Committee
