= Kampot (National Assembly constituency) =

- National Assembly constituency
- Province: Kampot
- Population: 592,845

Current constituency
- Created: 1993
- Seats: 6
- Member(s): Nim Chandara; Soam Chin; Un Sokunthea; Math Set; Pen Simon; Kieng Vang

Kampot Province (Khmer: ខេត្តកំពត) is one of the 25 constituencies of the National Assembly of Cambodia. It is allocated 6 seats in the National Assembly.

== MPs ==
Election	MP (Party)	MP (Party)	MP (Party)	MP (Party)	MP (Party)	MP (Party)
1993	Chay Saing Yun (CPP)	Ney Pena (CPP)	Som Kimsuor (CPP)	Chau Sen Chomno (FUNCINPEC)	Chum Kimeng (FUNCINPEC)	Eng Roland (FUNCINPEC)
1998	Soam Chin (CPP)	Ney Pena (CPP)	Salah Sen (CPP)	Ear Limsour (FUNCINPEC)	Soa Ning (FUNCINPEC)	Soam Kimsour (FUNCINPEC)
2003	Chay Saing Yun (CPP)	Ney Pena (CPP)	Som Kimsuor (CPP)	Kieng Vang (SRP)	Mam Bun Neang (FUNCINPEC)	Than Sina (FUNCINPEC)
2008	Nim Chantara (CPP)	Ney Pena (CPP)	Som Kimsuor (CPP)	Mu Sochua (SRP)	Saleh Sen (CPP)	Som Chen (CPP)
2013	Nim Chandara (CPP)	Soam Chin (CPP)	Un Sokunthea (CPP)	Chea Poch (CNRP)	Lim Bunsidareth (CNRP)	Van Samoeun (CNRP)
2018	Nim Chandara (CPP)	Soam Chin (CPP)	Un Sokunthea (CPP)	Math Set (CPP)	Pen Simon (CPP)	Kieng Vang (CPP)
