= Battambang (National Assembly constituency) =

Constituency of the National Assembly of Cambodia

- National Assembly constituency
- Province: Battambang
- Population: 987,400

Current constituency
- Created: 1993
- Seats: 8
- Members: Ang Vong Vathana; Chan Sophal; Chheang Vun; Laok Hour; Ly Kim Leang; Ngin Khorn; Sak Setha; Sar Kheng

Battambang Province (Khmer: ខេត្តបាត់ដំបង) is one of the 25 constituencies of the National Assembly of Cambodia. It is allocated 8 seats in the National Assembly.

== MPs ==
Election	MP (Party)	MP (Party)	MP (Party)	MP (Party)	MP (Party)	MP (Party)	MP (Party)	MP (Party)
1993	Chheang Vun (CPP)	Chuon Bunthol (CPP)	Sar Kheng (CPP)	Ky Lomorng (FUNCINPEC)	Ly Nareth (FUNCINPEC)	Phlong Sareth (FUNCINPEC)	Serey Kosal (FUNCINPEC)	Son Soubert (BLDP)
1998	Ly Kim Leang (CPP)	Muy Chat (CPP)	Sar Kheng (CPP)	Ky Lomorng (FUNCINPEC)	Cheam Channy (SRP)	Lon Phon (SRP)	Phorn Chantha (FUNCINPEC)	Sou Zakaryya (FUNCINPEC)
2003	Ly Kim Leang (CPP)	Dul Koeun (CPP)	Sar Kheng (CPP)	Nim Thot (CPP)	Ngin Khorn (CPP)	Eng Chhai Eang (SRP)	Nhek Bun Chhay (FUNCINPEC)	Toan Vanthara (SRP)
2008	Ly Kim Leang (CPP)	Chheang Vun (CPP)	Sar Kheng (CPP)	Chuonh Sochhay (CPP)	Muy Chat (CPP)	Eng Chhai Eang (SRP)	Tes Heanh (CPP)	Chiv Cata (SRP)
2013	Ly Kim Leang (CPP)	Chheang Vun (CPP)	Sar Kheng (CPP)	Lauk Hour (CPP)	Ngin Khorn (CPP)	Long Butha (CNRP)	Mu Sochua (CNRP)	Pin Rathana (CNRP)
2018	Ly Kim Leang (CPP)	Chheang Vun (CPP)	Sar Kheng (CPP)	Ang Vong Vathana (CPP)	Ngin Khorn (CPP)	Chan Sophal (CPP)	Laok Hour (CPP)	Sak Setha (CPP)
