= Banteay Meanchey (National Assembly constituency) =

- National Assembly constituency
- Province: Banteay Meanchey
- Population: 859,545

Current constituency
- Created: 1993
- Seats: 6
- Members: Pal Sam Oeun; Ke Kim Yan; Nuom Sophorn; Korsom Saroeuth; Serey Kosal; Y Long

Banteay Meanchey (Khmer: បន្ទាយមានជ័យ) is one of the 25 constituencies of the National Assembly of Cambodia. It is allocated 6 seats in the National Assembly.

== MPs ==
Election	MP (Party)	MP (Party)	MP (Party)	MP (Party)	MP (Party)	MP (Party)
1993	Ke Kim Yan (CPP)	Phit Pornou (CPP)	Lay Khaek (BLDP)	Mean Sarin (FUNCINPEC)	Men Saroeun (FUNCINPEC)	Thong Nov (FUNCINPEC)
1998	Moanh Kosal (CPP)	Phit Pornou (CPP)	Von Kan (CPP)	Hang Yuth (FUNCINPEC)	Men Saroeun (FUNCINPEC)	Kimsour Phirith (SRP)
2003	Pal Sam Oeun (CPP)	Try Chheang Huot (CPP)	Vong Kan (CPP)	Yim Chhaily (CPP)	Nheb Bunchin (FUNCINPEC)	Kimsour Phirith (SRP)
2008	Pal Sam Oeun (CPP)	Try Chheang Huot (CPP)	An Sum (CPP)	Yim Chhaily (CPP)	Nhek Bun Chhay (FUNCINPEC)	Yont Tharo (SRP/ CNRP)
2013	Pal Sam Oeun (CPP)	Ke Kim Yan (CPP)	Nuom Sophorn (CPP)	Yim Chhaily (CPP)	Long Ry (CNRP)	Yont Tharo (SRP/ CNRP)
2018	Pal Sam Oeun (CPP)	Ke Kim Yan (CPP)	Nuom Sophorn (CPP)	Korsom Saroeuth (CPP)	Serey Kosal (CPP)	Y Long (CPP)
