= Kampong Thom (National Assembly constituency) =

- Constituency for the National Assembly of Cambodia
- Province: Kampong Thom Province
- Population: 987,400

Current constituency
- Created: 1993
- Seats: 6
- Members: Chea Oeung; Nguon Nhel; Kheoung Hupheap; Norng Veasna; Thong Khon; Yim Leat

Kampong Thom (Khmer: កំពង់ធំ) is one of the 25 constituencies of the National Assembly of Cambodia. It is allocated 10 seats in the National Assembly.

== MPs ==
Election	MP (Party)	MP (Party)	MP (Party)	MP (Party)	MP (Party)	MP (Party)
1993	Chean Chanto (CPP)	Nguon Nhel (CPP)	Un Neung (CPP)	Khan Savoeun (FUNCINPEC)	Pol Hom (BLDP)	So Chy (FUNCINPEC)
1998	Khieu Horl (CPP)	Nguon Nhel (CPP)	Un Neung (CPP)	Ning Sen (FUNCINPEC)	Poa Try (CPP)	Peng Ly (FUNCINPEC)
2003	Thong Khon (CPP)	Nguon Nhel (CPP)	Un Neung (CPP)	Poa Bun Sreu (FUNCINPEC)	Poa Try (CPP)	Sok Pheng (SRP)
2008	Nhem Thavy (CPP)	Nguon Nhel (CPP)	Un Neung (CPP)	Kuch Moly (FUNCINPEC)	Sik Bun Hok (CPP)	Men Sothavarin (SRP/ CNRP)
2013	Nhem Thavy (CPP)	Nguon Nhel (CPP)	Sik Bunhok (CPP)	Lim Kimya (CNRP)	Cheam Channy (CNRP)	Men Sothavarin (SRP/ CNRP)
2018	Chea Oeung (CPP)	Nguon Nhel (CPP)	Kheoung Nupheap (CPP)	Norng Veasna (CPP)	Thong Khon (CPP)	Yim Leat (CPP)
