= List of members of the National Assembly of Cambodia =

A list of members of the National Assembly of Cambodia include:

- First National Assembly, 1993–98
- Second National Assembly, 1998–2003
- Third National Assembly, 2003–08
- Fourth National Assembly, 2008–2013
- Fifth National Assembly, 2013–18
- Sixth National Assembly, 2018–2023
