= Sok =

Sok or SOK may refer to:

== Organizations ==
- SOK Group, a Russian holding company
- Suomen Osuuskauppojen Keskuskunta, one of 20 retailing regional cooperatives in the Finnish organization S Group
- Swedish Olympic Committee (Sveriges Olympiska Kommitté)

== People ==
- Bailey Sok (born 2004), American singer, professional dancer and choreographer, member of co-ed group Allday Project
- Sok Chang-suk (born 1963), North Korean archer
- G.W. Sok (born 1957), Dutch singer
- Jean Sok, French-born one-legged professional breakdancer
- Wong Sok I (born 1993), Macau karateka

=== Cambodia ===
- Khin Sok (1942–2011), historian, linguist, literature and arts scholar
- Sok Chanphal (born 1984), songwriter
- Sok Kong (born 1948), Khmer businessman
- Sok Siphana (born 1960), lawyer
- Sok Sreymom, film star
- Sok Touch, intellectual

==== Footballers ====
- Sok Chanraksmey (born 1992)
- Sok Pheng (footballer) (born 1990)
- Sok Rithy (born 1990)
- Sok Samnang (born 1995)
- Sok Sovan (born 1992)

==== Politicians ====
- Sok An (1950–2017), academic
- Sok Pheng
- Sok San
- Sok Soty
- Vorn Vet (1929–1978; born Sok Thuok)

== Other ==
- Hok/sok system, a postsegregational killing mechanism employed by the R1 plasmid in Escherichia coli
- Oi language (also called the Sok language), an Austroasiatic dialect cluster of Attapeu Province, southern Laos
- Saviors of Kamigawa, an expansion set of the Kamigawa expert-level block for the Magic: The Gathering
- Sok (river), in Samara and Orenburg Oblasts, Russia
- South Kenton station (station code: SOK), in Kenton, north-west London
- SOK, a non-/less-lethal defense spray marketed as a safer and less harmful alternative to pepper spray, intended for use in general and personal defense and riot control
