= Bun (disambiguation) =

A bun is a type of small sweet cake or bread roll.

Bun or BUN may also refer to:

== Science and technology ==
- Blood urea nitrogen (BUN test), a medical test
- Bun (software), a JavaScript runtime
- Occipital bun, a bulge at the back of the skull
- Buttocks (slang: buns), of a human body

== Places ==
- Bún, a village in Albești, Mureș, Romania
- Bun, Hautes-Pyrénées, a commune of France
- Bun Island, Qikiqtaaluk Region, Nunavut, Canada

== Language ==
- Bun language, Yuat language of Papua New Guinea
- Bun language (Vanuatu) or Mwotlap language, an Oceanic language
- Sherbro language (ISO 639 code), of Sierra Leone

== People ==
=== Given name ===
- Bun E. Carlos (born 1951), American drummer
- Bun Cook (1904–1988), Canadian ice hockey player
- Bun B (born 1973), American rapper
- Bun Bun (Yasuaki Fujita), Japanese composer
- Bun Kenny (born 1990), Cambodian–French retired tennis player
- Bun Lai, Asian American chef
- Bun LaPrairie (1911–1986), ice hockey player
- Bun Rany (born 1953), wife of Cambodian Prime Minister
- Bun Troy (1888–1918), baseball player
- Chou Bun Eng (born 1956), Cambodian politician
- Kuoy Bun Reun (born 1967), Cambodian politician
- Lam Bun (1930–1967), assassinated Hong Kong radio commentator
- Mam Bun Neang, Cambodian politician
- Nhek Bun Chhay, Cambodian politician
- Poa Bun Sreu, Cambodian politician

=== Surname ===
- Alexandru cel Bun, prince of Moldavia 1400–1432

== Fictional characters ==
- Bun-bun, in the Sluggy Freelance webcomic
- Bun (or Tuff), in the anime Kirby: Right Back At Ya!
- Cinnamon Bun, a character in the Adventure Time animated series

== Other uses ==
- Bun (hairstyle)
- Bún (Vietnamese for rice vermicelli)
- Bun Bars, a chocolate candy bar
- Rabbit (Scottish dialect: bun for rabbits and squirrels)

== See also ==
- BUN-to-creatinine ratio, a medical test
- Bunn, a surname
- Bunne, Dutch village
