= Oddar Meanchey (National Assembly constituency) =

- National Assembly constituency
- Province: Oddar Meanchey
- Population: 276,038

Current constituency
- Created: 1993
- Seats: 1
- Member(s): Kun Kim

Oddar Meanchey (Khmer: ឧត្តរមានជ័យ) is one of the 25 constituencies of the National Assembly of Cambodia. It is allocated 1 seat in the National Assembly.

== MPs ==
| Election | MP (Party) |
|---|---|
| 2003 | Nou Sam (CPP) |
| 2008 | Nou Sam (CPP) |
| 2013 | Nou Sam (CPP) |
| 2018 | Kun Kim (CPP) |
