= Keo Saphal =

Keo Saphal may refer to:

- Keo Saphal (Siem Reap politician), Cambodian politician who represents Siem Reap in the National Assembly
- Keo Saphal (Takeo politician), Cambodian politician who represents Takeo in the National Assembly
