= Try =

Try or TRY may refer to:

== Music ==
=== Albums ===
- Try (Bebo Norman album) (2014)
- Try!, by the John Mayer Trio

=== Songs ===
- "Try" (Blue Rodeo song) (1987)
- "Try" (Colbie Caillat song) (2014)
- "Try" (Michael Penn song) (1997)
- "Try" (Nelly Furtado song) (2004)
- "Try" (Pink song) (2012)
- "Try" (Pseudo Echo song) (1985)
- "Try" (Rick Astley song) (2018)
- "Try" (Schiller song) (2010)
- "Try (Just a Little Bit Harder)", by Janis Joplin from I Got Dem Ol' Kozmic Blues Again Mama!
- "Try", by Backstreet Boys from In a World Like This
- "Try", by Dolly Parton from Blue Smoke
- "Try", by Lobo from the 1973 album Calumet (album)
- "Try", by Natasha Bedingfield from the 2010 album Strip Me
- "Try", by the Drums from the 2019 album Brutalism
- "Try", by Nilüfer Yanya from the 2022 album Painless
- "Try", 1995, by Pennywise from About Time
- "Try", 2005, by The Magic Numbers from The Magic Numbers
- "Try", by The xx from the 2012 album Coexist
- "Try (Just a Little Bit Harder)", by Roxette from Room Service

== Sport ==
- Try (rugby), a way of scoring points in rugby league and rugby union
- Try, a conversion or way of scoring points in American and Canadian football

== Television ==
- "Try" (The Killing), an episode of The Killing
- "Try" (The Walking Dead), an episode of The Walking Dead

== Other uses ==
- Turkish lira's ISO 4217 code
- Try, a 2006 novel by Lily Burana
- Try, a statement used in the exception handling syntax of several computer languages
- Try, boiling fat, such as in a whaling operation, to produce oil
- Life (video games), also sometimes called a try

== People with the name ==
=== Given name ===
- Try Bennett (born 1975), retired Costa Rican footballer
- Try Hamdani (born 1994), Indonesian footballer
- Poa Try, Cambodian politician
- Try Sutrisno (1935–2026), 6th vice president of Indonesia

=== Surname ===
- Try Chheang Huot (died 2015), Cambodian politician
- Kjetil Try (born 1959), Norwegian executive and writer

== See also ==
- Trie, an ordered tree data structure
