= Pursat (National Assembly constituency) =

- National Assembly constituency
- Province: Pursat
- Population: 419,752

Current constituency
- Created: 1993
- Seats: 4
- Member(s): Em Ponna; Keo Ratanak; Suy Sem; Ty Norin

Pursat Province (Khmer: ខេត្តពោធិ៍សាត់) is one of the 25 constituencies of the National Assembly of Cambodia. It is allocated 4 seats in the National Assembly.

== MPs ==
Election	MP (Party)	MP (Party)	MP (Party)	MP (Party)
1993	Suy Sem (CPP)	Sar Kapun (CPP)	Yim Savy (FUNCINPEC)	Cheam Un (FUNCINPEC)
1998	Sman Keat (CPP)	Sar Kapun (CPP)	Say Mongkul (FUNCINPEC)	Cheam Un (FUNCINPEC)
2003	Suy Sem (CPP)	Chin Bun Sean (CPP)	Ly Thuch (FUNCINPEC)	Mey Norn (CPP)
2008	Ly Narun (CPP)	Sman Teath (CPP)	Em Ponna (CPP)	Sary Kosal (CPP)
2013	Tan Kimven (CPP)	Suy Sem (CPP)	Em Ponna (CPP)	Ngim Nheng (CNRP)
2018	Ty Norin (CPP)	Suy Sem (CPP)	Em Ponna (CPP)	Keo Ratanak (CPP)
