= Poch (disambiguation) =

Poch is a card game.

Poch or POCH may also refer to:

- Progressive Organizations of Switzerland, a defunct communist party
- Poch (surname), with a list of people surnamed Poch
- Poch Juinio, basketball player
- Mauricio Pochettino, association football player and manager
