= Khun Haing =

Cambodian politician

Khun Haing is a Cambodian politician. He belongs to Funcinpec and was elected to represent Svay Rieng Province in the National Assembly of Cambodia in 2003.
