= Khek Vandy =

Cambodian politician

Khek Vandy (Khmer: ខែក វ៉ាន់ឌី, 26 September 1929 – 31 July 2012) is a Cambodian politician. He belongs to Funcinpec and was elected to represent Takeo Province in the National Assembly of Cambodia in 2003.

He was born on 26 September 1929 in Kampot, Cambodia. He was married to Duong Rotha. He attended Preah Sisowath High School in Phnom Penh and the École Supérieure de Commerce in Lyon, France.

Banque Nationale du Cambodge, Directeur General au Commerce Exterieur, Ministere du Commerce P.D.G. des Magasins d'Etat Representant du Cambodge a l'Exposition Universelle a Osaka, Japon Minister of Health Depute, Province de Takeo de 1998 a 2010

Khek Vandy died at the Calmette Hospital in Phnom Penh on 31 July 2012.
