= Democratic Movement of Change =

Cambodian electoral alliance

The Democratic Movement of Change is a Cambodian electoral alliance between the two main democratic opposition parties, the Sam Rainsy Party and the Human Rights Party founded in early 2009 to run together in the 2012 local and 2013 general elections.

The two political opposition parties in Cambodia, the Sam Rainsy Party (SRP) and the Human Rights Party (HRP), are now reunited in a “Democratic Movement for Change”, an alliance formed in January 2009. Representatives of the two formations say they are proud of their new solidarity. Not only do they hope to put an end to several years of election failure but they also wish to make a serious challenge to the seemingly immovable ruling Cambodian People's Party (CPP), considered within the coalition to exemplify a Prime Minister holding power for too long. Before the next elections, the alliance will likely attempt a full merger between the SRP and HRP, scheduled for 2011.
