= Lu Laysreng =

Cambodian politician

Lu Laysreng (born 1938) is one of Cambodia's deputy prime ministers as well as the country's minister of rural development. He belongs to Funcinpec and was elected to represent Kampong Speu province in the National Assembly of Cambodia in 2003.

Lu was born in Phnom Penh, Cambodia, to Chinese immigrants from Jieyang but stayed in Swatow between the ages of six and fifteen for his primary and secondary education before returning to Cambodia. Lu pursued his university studies at California State University, Long Beach, also acquiring American citizenship before returning to Cambodia to serve in politics. After the 2003 elections, he was subsequently appointed as the Cambodian information minister, and is one of the key personalities instrumental in fostering the kingdom's closer ties with China.

In one interview, Lu mentioned that his Chinese name is "杨来盛", but that he was frequently addressed as "呂来盛", a transliteration of his Khmer name "Lu Lay Sreng". Lu is fluent in Khmer, Teochew and English.
