= Mondulkiri (National Assembly constituency) =

- Constituency for the National Assembly of Cambodia
- Province: Mondulkiri Province
- Population: 88,649

Current constituency
- Created: 1993
- Seats: 1
- Members: Chan Yoeun

Mondulkiri (Khmer: មណ្ឌលគិរី) is one of the 6 constituencies of the National Assembly of Cambodia. It is allocated 1 seat in the National Assembly.

== Member of Parliament ==
Election	MP (Party)
1993	Beuy Kerk (FUNCINPEC)
1998	Rath Sarem (CPP)
2003	Rath Sarem (CPP)
2008	Rath Sarem (CPP)
2013	Chan Yoeun (CPP)
2018	Chan Yoeun (CPP)

== Election results ==
=== 2023 ===
Party	Lead Candidate	Popular Vote				Seats	
Party	Lead Candidate	Votes	Vote Change	%	Swing	Seats Won	Seat Change
Cambodian People's Party	Chan Yoeun	33,925	8,348	84.79%	2.26	1	Steady
FUNCINPEC	Than Vanna	2,000	903	5.0%	1.27	0	Steady
Cambodia Indigenous People's Democracy Party	Srong Kate	1,208	181	3.02%	1.71	0	Steady
Dharmacracy Party	Mon Ravi	620	New	1.55%	New	0	New
Khmer National United Party	Miech Sam Oeun	469	85	1.17%	0.72	0	Steady
Cambodian Youth Party	Em Yim Vichet	445	New	1.11%	New	0	New
Khmer United Party	Chean Mea	298	New	0.74%	New	0	New
People Purpose Party	Plong Ravin	269	New	0.67%	New	0	New
Women for Women Party	Neuy His	260	New	0.65%	New	0	New
Khmer Anti-Poverty Party	Phon Tol	214	263	0.53%	1.09	0	Steady
Cambodia Nationality Party	Mak Phorn	170	117	0.42%	0.56	0	Steady
Democracy Power Party	Eng Srey Moch	133	New	0.33%	New	0	New
Total	41,690			100%		1	
Valid votes	40,011						
Invalid/blank votes	1,679						
Total votes	41,690						
Registered voters/turnout	51,627 (80.75%)						
Source: National Election Committee
