= Khy Taing Lim =

Cambodian politician

Khy Taing Lim (Khmer: ឃី តាំងលឹម) is the Cambodian Minister for Public Works and Transport. He belongs to Funcinpec and was elected to represent Phnom Penh in the National Assembly of Cambodia in 2003. Lim is of Chinese descent.
