= Kuoch Ky =

Cambodian politician

Kuoch Ky is a Cambodian politician. He belongs to Funcinpec, a royalist political party, and was elected to represent Prey Veng Province in the National Assembly of Cambodia in 2003. Kuoch currently serves as the Secretary of State for Commerce and is of Chinese descent, being the son of Chinese immigrants from Jieyang. His real Chinese name: 郭基 (Guo Ji)
