= 2007 Cambodian communal elections =

- 1 April 2007

1,621 Commune Chiefs 11,353 Commune Councillors
- Registered: 7,799,371 ▲50.3%
- Turnout: 5,293,327 (67.9%) ▼19.7%
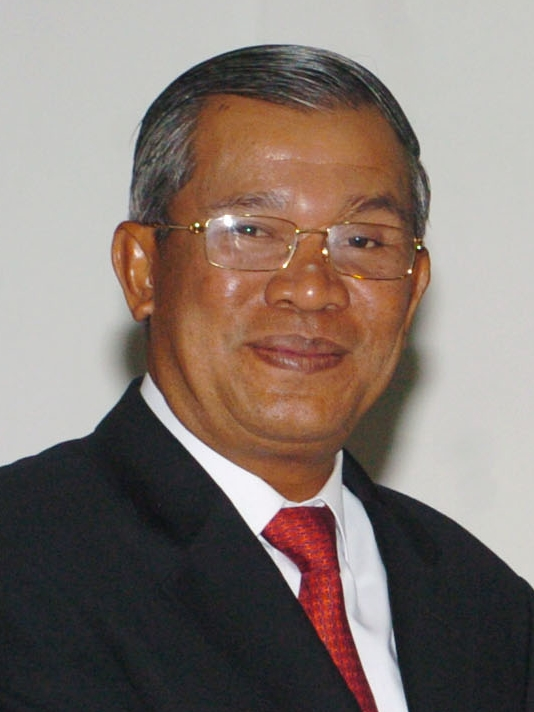

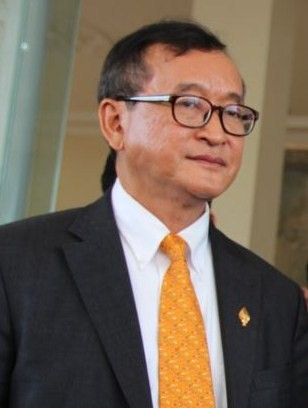

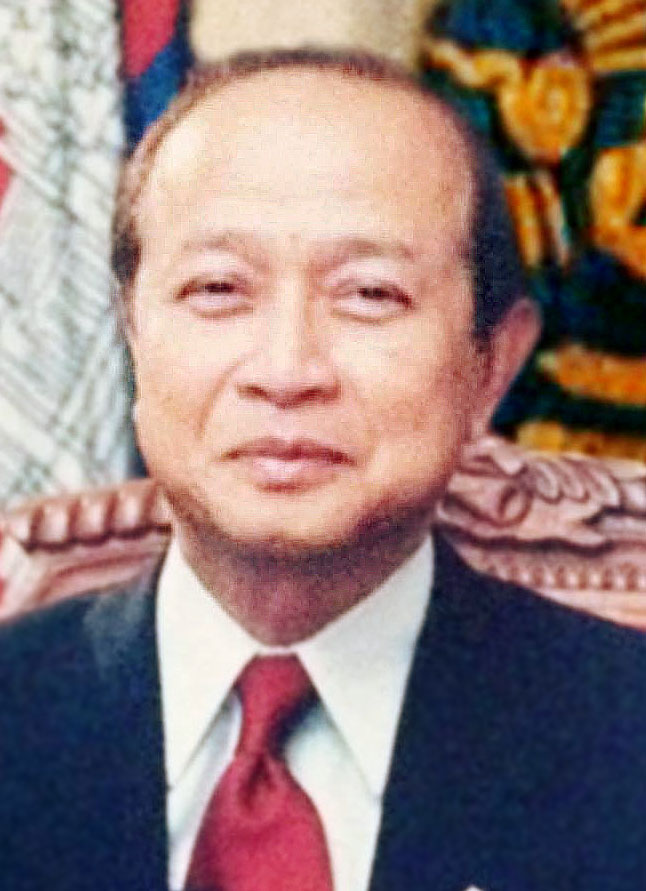
	First party	Second party	Third party
Leader	Hun Sen	Sam Rainsy	Norodom Ranariddh
Party	CPP	SRP	NRP
Leader since	14 January 1985	2 November 1995	18 November 2006
Last election	1,598 chiefs 7,552 councillors 60.9%	13 chiefs 1,329 councillors 16.9%	Did not contest
Popular vote	3,148,533	1,303,906	419,791
Percentage	60.8%	25.2%	8.1%
Swing	▼0.1%	▲8.3%	New
Chiefs	1,591	28	0
Chiefs +/–	▼7	▲15	New
Councillors	7,993	2,660	425
Councillors +/–	▲441	▲1,331	New

Communal elections were held in Cambodia on 1 April 2007.

== Results ==
Party	Votes	%	Chiefs	+/–	Councillors	+/–
Cambodian People's Party	3,148,533	60.82	1,591	–7	7,993	+441
Sam Rainsy Party	1,303,906	25.19	28	+15	2,660	+1,331
Norodom Ranariddh Party	419,791	8.11	0	New	425	New
FUNCINPEC	277,545	5.36	2	–8	274	–1,920
Other parties	27,090	0.52	0	–	1	–
Invalid/blank votes	116,458	–	–	–	–	–
Total	5,293,727	100	1,621	0	11,353	+92
Registered voters/turnout	7,799,371	67.87	–	–	–	–
Source: COMFREL
