= Tuot Saron =

Cambodian politician

- Occupation: political activist
- Known for: 2008 to 2010 arrest
- Political party: Sam Rainsy Party

Tuot Saron is a Cambodian activist for the Sam Rainsy Party (SRP). He was imprisoned from 2008 to 2010 on a charge of "being an accomplice to unlawful confinement". Amnesty International called the charges against him politically motivated and named him a prisoner of conscience.

Tuot Saron served as a commune chief of Pong Ro commune, Baray District, Kampong Thom Province.

In the months leading up to Cambodia's 2008 General Election, Tuot Saron and three colleagues were allegedly asked to protect an SRP candidate, Tim Norn, who had come under pressure to join the ruling Cambodian People’s Party (CPP). Following the candidate's later defection to the CPP, Tuot Saron was arrested on 18 March on charges of having abducted the candidate. On 20 March 2009, he was brought to trial, convicted, and sentenced to three years' imprisonment.

Several international human rights groups protested his arrest. Human Rights Watch described the arrest as "dubious" and "part of a ruling party campaign to weaken political rivals prior to national elections". Amnesty International called the charges "baseless and politically motivated" and stated that they were filed "in order to intimidate other opposition party activists". The organization named Tuot Saron a prisoner of conscience and called for his immediate release.

Tuot Saron was released on 26 November 2010, following a Royal Pardon decree.
