= Poch (surname) =

Poch or Pöch may refer to:

- Amparo Poch y Gascón, (1902–1968) Spanish anarchist, doctor, and activist in the years leading up to and during the Spanish Civil War
- Carles Poch-Gradin (born 1982), Spanish professional tennis player
- Chea Poch, Cambodian politician
- Mauricio Pochettino, Argentine former footballer and manager of Manchester United
- Poch Juinio, former Filipino Professional basketball player of the Philippine Basketball Association
- Rudolf Pöch (1870–1921), Austrian doctor, anthropologist, and ethnologist
- Terri Poch (born 1967), American bodybuilder and former professional wrestler

== See also ==
- Poch'ŏn, kun, or county, in Ryanggang province, North Korea
