= Kong Vibol =

Cambodian politician

Kong Vibol (Khmer: គង់ វិបុល); is a Cambodian politician. He belongs to the Cambodian People's Party (CPP).

Kong Vibol is Minister Attached to the Prime Minister in charge as Director General of the General Department of Taxation, Ministry of Economy and Finance and vice-chairman of the Council for the Development of Cambodia, (CDC).

Like many other high-ranking officials, Vibol's biggest scandal involved corruption. In 2017, in a series of interviews, Al Jazeera alleged that Kong had accumulated millions of dollars of Australian property despite officially earning less than $12,000 a year. However, in the Voice of America's Report, Vibol refuted the claim, saying that he had been misrepresented.
