= Stung Treng (National Assembly constituency) =

- National Assembly constituency
- Province: Stung Treng
- Population: 165,713

Current constituency
- Created: 1993
- Seats: 1
- Member(s): Loy Sophat

Stung Treng Province (Khmer: ខេត្តស្ទឹងត្រែង) is one of the 25 constituencies of the National Assembly of Cambodia. It is allocated 1 seat in the National Assembly.

== MPs ==
Election	MP (Party)
1993	Van Vuth (CPP)
1998	Van Vuth (CPP)
2003	Sorn Inthor (CPP)
2008	Sorn Inthor (CPP)
2013	Loy Sophat (CPP)
2018	Loy Sophat (CPP)
