= Sok San =

Cambodian politician

Sok San is a Cambodian politician. He belongs to Funcinpec and was elected to represent Kampong Chhnang Province in the National Assembly of Cambodia in 2003.
