= Hong Sun Huot =

Cambodian politician

Hong Sun Huot (Khmer: ហុង ស៊ុនហួត) was the Cambodian Minister of Health and Chairman of the National AIDS Authority, as well as a Senior Minister. He belongs to Funcinpec and was elected to represent Kandal Province in the National Assembly of Cambodia in 2003. Hong is a third generation Chinese-Cambodian, with ancestral roots hailing from Chaozhou. His Chinese Family is 杨 (Yang).
