= Toan Vanthara =

Cambodian politician

Toan Vanthara (Khmer: តន់ វ៉ាន់ថារ៉ា) is a Cambodian politician. He belongs to the Sam Rainsy Party and was elected to represent Battambang in the National Assembly of Cambodia in 2003.
