= Thak Lany =

Cambodian politician

Thak Lany (Khmer: ថាក់ ឡានី) is a Cambodian politician. She belongs to the Sam Rainsy Party and was elected to represent Kampong Cham Province in the National Assembly of Cambodia in 2003.
