= Koh Kong (National Assembly constituency) =

- National Assembly constituency
- Province: Koh Kong
- Population: 123,618

Current constituency
- Created: 1993
- Seats: 1
- Member(s): Dom Yuhean

Koh Kong (Khmer: កោះកុង) is one of the 25 constituencies of the National Assembly of Cambodia. It is allocated 1 seat in the National Assembly.

== MPs ==
Election	MP (Party)
1993	Rong Phlam Kesorn (CPP)
1998	Ay Khorn (CPP)
2003	Ay Khorn (CPP)
2008	Ay Khorn (CPP)
2013	Ay Khorn (CPP)
2018	Dom Yuhean (CPP)
