= Sok Soty =

Member of National Assembly of Cambodia

Sok Soty (Khmer: សុខ សុទី) is a Cambodian politician. He belongs to the Sam Rainsy Party and was elected to represent Phnom Penh in the National Assembly of Cambodia in 2003.
