= Chrea Sochenda =

Cambodian politician

Chrea Sochenda (Khmer: ជ្រា សុចិន្ដា) is a Cambodian politician. He belongs to the Sam Rainsy Party and was elected to represent Kandal Province in the National Assembly of Cambodia in 2003.
