= Nuth Rumduol =

Cambodian politician

Member of Parliament for Kampong Speu
- In office 2003 – 16 November 2017

Senator of Cambodia
- In office 24 March 2012 – 9 April 2013

Personal details
- Born: 25 December 1946 (age 79) Svay Rieng, Cambodia
- Party: Cambodia National Rescue Party
- Other political affiliations: Sam Rainsy Party (1998–2013)
- Children: 5

Nuth Rumdoul (Khmer: នុត រំដួល) is a Cambodian politician. He belongs to the Sam Rainsy Party and was elected to represent Kampong Speu Province in the National Assembly of Cambodia in 2003.
