= Keo Saphal (Takeo politician) =

Cambodian politician

Keo Saphal is a Cambodian politician. He belongs to FUNCINPEC and was elected to represent Takeo Province in the National Assembly of Cambodia in 2003.
