= Ly Thuch =

Cambodian politician

Ly Thuch (Khmer: លី ធុជ) is a Cambodian politician who serves as the Senior Minister. He belongs to the Cambodian People's Party and was elected to represent Pursat Province in the National Assembly of Cambodia in 2003.

Ly Thuch is also the First Vice President of the Cambodia Mine Action and Victim Assistance Authority which oversees landmine clearance and assistance to mine victims in Cambodia.

In November 2023, Ly was names Chair of the Ottawa Treaty for 2024.
