= Than Sina =

Cambodian politician

Than Sina (Khmer: ថាន់ ស៊ីណា) is a Cambodian politician. He was elected to represent Kampot Province in the National Assembly of Cambodia in 2003.
