= Ou Chanrith =

Cambodian politician

Member of Parliament for Kandal
- In office 24 September 2008 – 16 November 2017
- Majority: 104,199 (15.91%)

Personal details
- Born: 25 February 1969 (age 57) Prey Kabbas, Takéo, Cambodia
- Party: Cambodia National Rescue Party (2012–17); Human Rights Party (2007–2012)
- Education: Southwest University (M.Sc); California State University, Fresno (B.Sc)

Ou Chanrith (Khmer: អ៊ូ ច័ន្ទឫទ្ធិ; born 25 February 1969) is a Cambodian politician. He is a member of the Cambodia National Rescue Party and he represents Kandal Province as its Member of Parliament (MP). He was a member of the Human Rights Party from 2007 to 2012.
