= Ngor Sovann =

Cambodian politician

Ngor Sovann (Khmer: ង៉ោ សុវណ្ណ) is a Cambodian politician. He was reelected to represent Kandal Province in the National Assembly of Cambodia in July 2018. 2008–2018, he was minister, Minister Attached to the Prime Minister and Secretary of State of Ministry of Justice in the Royal Government of Cambodia. He became a member of Central Committee of Cambodian People's Party, 2015.
