= Kea Sahorn =

Cambodian politician

Kea Sahorn is a Cambodian politician. He belongs to the Cambodian People's Party and was elected to represent Kep in the National Assembly of Cambodia in 2003.
