= Vong Kan =

Cambodian politician

Vong Kan (Khmer: វង កាន) is a Cambodian politician. He belongs to Cambodian People's Party and was elected to represent Banteay Meanchey in the National Assembly of Cambodia in 2003.
