= Mam Bun Neang =

Cambodian politician

Mam Bun Neang is a Cambodian politician. He belongs to the Funcinpec party and was elected to represent Kampot Province in the National Assembly of Cambodia in the 2003 National Elections. He was the Deputy Governor of Phnom Penh and a supporter of Prince Ranariddh.
