= Hul Savorn =

Cambodian politician

Hul Savorn (Khmer: ហ៊ុល សាវ័ន្ត) is a Cambodian politician. He belongs to the Cambodian People's Party and was elected to represent Svay Rieng Province in the National Assembly of Cambodia in 2003.
