= Poa Bun Sreu =

Canadian politician

Poa Bun Sreu is a Cambodian politician. He belongs to Funcinpec and was elected to represent Kampong Thom Province in the National Assembly of Cambodia in 2003.
