= Suos Kanan =

Cambodian politician

Suos Kanan (Khmer: សួស កាណាន) is a Cambodian politician. He belongs to the Cambodian People's Party and was elected to represent Sihanoukville in the National Assembly of Cambodia in 2003.
