= Kieng Vang =

Cambodian politician

Kieng Vang (Khmer: កៀង វ៉ាង) is a Cambodian politician. He belongs to the Sam Rainsy Party and was elected to represent Kampot Province in the National Assembly of Cambodia in 2003.
