= Chay Saing Yun =

Cambodian politician

Chay Saing Yun is a Cambodian politician. He belongs to the Cambodian People's Party and was elected to represent Kampot Province in the National Assembly of Cambodia in 2003.
