= Nim Thot =

Cambodian politician

Nim Thot is a Cambodian politician. He belongs to the Cambodian People's Party and was elected to represent Battambang in the National Assembly of Cambodia in 2003.
