= Chin Bun Sean =

Cambodian politician

Chin Bun Sean is a Cambodian politician. He belongs to the Cambodian People's Party and was elected to represent Pursat Province in the National Assembly of Cambodia in 2003.
