= Keo Saphal (Siem Reap politician) =

Cambodian politician

Keo Saphal is a Cambodian politician. He belongs to the Cambodian People's Party and was elected to represent Siem Reap Province in the National Assembly of Cambodia in 2003.
