= Mey Norn =

Cambodian politician

Mey Norn (Khmer: ម៉ី ណន) is a Cambodian politician. He belongs to the Cambodian People's Party and was elected to represent Pursat Province in the National Assembly of Cambodia in 2003.
