= Um Nhanh =

Cambodian politician

Um Nhanh (Khmer: អ៊ុំ ញ៉ាញ់) is a Cambodian politician. He belongs to the Cambodian People's Party and was elected to represent Phnom Penh in the National Assembly of Cambodia in 2003.
