= Kep (National Assembly constituency) =

- National Assembly constituency
- Province: Kep
- Population: 41,798

Current constituency
- Created: 1993
- Seats: 1
- Members: Cham Prasidh

Kep Province (Khmer: ខេត្តកែប) is one of the 25 constituencies of the National Assembly of Cambodia. It is allocated 1 seat in the National Assembly.

== MPs ==
Election	MP (Party)
1998	Kea Sahorn (CPP)
2003	Cham Prasidh, succeeded by An He (CPP)
2008	Cham Prasidh, succeeded by An He (CPP)
2013 2018	Cham Prasidh, succeeded by Nguon Bien (CPP)

2023 Cham Prasidh ( CPP)
