= Rath Sarem =

Cambodian politician

Rath Sarem is a Cambodian politician. He belongs to the Cambodian People's Party and was elected to represent Mondulkiri province in the National Assembly of Cambodia in 2003.
