= Sorn Inthor =

Cambodian politician

Sorn Inthor (Khmer: សន អ៊ិនថរ) is a Cambodian politician. He belongs to the Cambodian People's Party and was elected to represent Stung Treng Province in the National Assembly of Cambodia in 2003.
