= Kimsour Phirith =

Cambodian politician

Kimsour Phirith (Khmer: គីមសួរ ភីរិទ្ធ) is a Cambodian politician. He belongs to the Sam Rainsy Party and was elected to represent Banteay Meanchey in the National Assembly of Cambodia in 2003.
