= Un Neung =

Cambodian politician

Un Neung (Khmer: អ៊ុន នឹង) is a Cambodian politician. He belongs to the Cambodian People's Party and was elected to represent Kampong Thom Province in the National Assembly of Cambodia in 2003.
