= Poa Try =

Cambodian politician

Poa Try is a Cambodian politician. He belongs to the Cambodian People's Party and was elected to represent Kampong Thom Province in the National Assembly of Cambodia in 2003.
