= Mao Monyvann =

Cambodian politician

Mao Monyvann (Khmer: ម៉ៅ មុនីវណ្ណ, born 11 October 1963) is a Cambodian politician. He belongs to the Cambodia National Rescue Party and was elected to represent Kampong Cham Province in the National Assembly of Cambodia in 2003.
