= Lork Kheng =

Cambodian politician

- Born: 25 March 1955 (age 71); Kampong Cham province
- Occupation: politician
- Known for: three decades as an MP
- Political party: Cambodian People's Party

Lork Kheng (born 1955) is a Cambodian businessperson who became a politician in the National Assembly. She is a member of the Cambodian People's Party for Phnom Penh.

== Life ==
Kheng was born in the Province of Kampong Cham in 1955. She was her parents sixth child and that had four more. The Pol Pot regime ended in January 1979 and afterwards Kheng who was a policeman's wife became a business person. She used her capital to give small interest-free loans to others. She went to work for the head of the Cambodian People's Party, Chea Sim, and studied at the Royal Administration School.

The Cambodian People's Party has been in power since 1979 and she became one of their candidates in Phnom Phen and she was elected in 2008 to the National Assembly and re-elected in 2013 and she became the Chair of Commission on Public Health, Social Work, Veterans, Youth, Rehabilitation, Labour, Vocational Training and Women’s Affairs.

In 2025 Kheng was in South Korea where she chaired a meeting of the International Association of First Ladies for Peace.
