= Nhek Bun Chhay =

Cambodian politician

- ញឹក ប៊ុនឆៃ
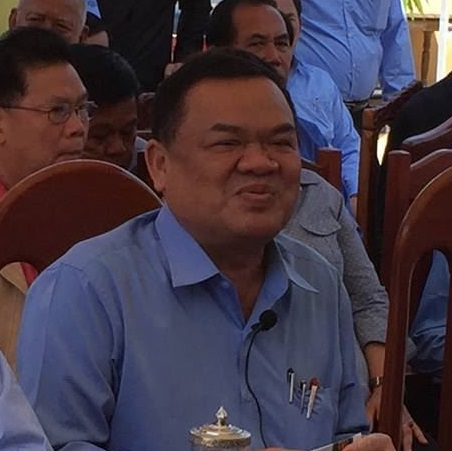
- Chhay in 2016

Leader of the Khmer National United Party
- Incumbent
- Assumed office 2016

Member of Parliament
- In office 2 July 1993 – 28 July 2013
- Constituency: Battambang (1993–2008); Banteay Meanchey (2008–2013)

Deputy Prime Minister of Cambodia
- In office 16 July 2004 – 24 September 2013
- Monarchs: Norodom Sihanouk; Norodom Sihamoni
- Prime Minister: Hun Sen

Second Vice President of the Senate
- In office 1999–2003
- President: Chea Sim

Personal details
- Born: 1956 (age 69–70) Battambang, Cambodia
- Party: Khmer National United Party
- Other political affiliations: FUNCINPEC (until 2016)
- Spouse: Sam Sopheap
- Education: St. Clements University
- Profession: Politician

Nhek Bun Chhay (Khmer: ញឹក ប៊ុនឆៃ; born 1956) is a Cambodian politician and leader of the Khmer National United Party. Prior to his career in the military, he began as a rebel and supported the royalist forces of Funcinpec until he rose to the rank of general. He began his career as a politician after the downfall of FUNCINPEC and founded his own political party.
