= Som Kimsuor =

Cambodian politician

Som Kimsuor (Khmer: សោម គឹមសួគ៌) is a Cambodian politician. She belongs to the Cambodian People's Party and was elected to represent Kampot Province in the National Assembly of Cambodia in 2003.
