= Chan Cheng =

Cambodian politician

Chan Cheng (Khmer: ចាន់ ចេង) is a Cambodian politician. He belongs to the Sam Rainsy Party and was elected to represent Kandal Province in the National Assembly of Cambodia in 2003.
