= Sok Pheng =

Cambodian politician

Sok Pheng (Khmer: សុក ផេង) is a Cambodian politician. He is now the secretary of state of the council of ministers and vice-president of councillor of jurists.
