= Pen Panha =

Cambodian politician (born 1941)

Pen Panha (Khmer: ប៉ែន បញ្ញា, born 21 October 1941) is a Cambodian politician. He belongs to the Cambodian People's Party and was elected to represent Prey Veng Province in the National Assembly of Cambodia in 2003.
