= Ay Khorn =

Cambodian politician

Ay Khorn (Khmer: អាយ ខន) is a Cambodian politician. He is a member of the Cambodian People's Party and was elected to represent Koh Kong Province in the National Assembly of Cambodia in the 2003 elections.
