= Nou Sam =

Cambodian politician

Nou Sam (Khmer: នៅ សំ) is a Cambodian politician. He belongs to the Cambodian People's Party and was elected to represent Oddar Meancheay Province in the National Assembly of Cambodia in 2003.
