= Ho Non =

Cambodian politician

Her Excellency Ho Non MP
- ហូ ណូន

Minister of Commerce
- In office 24 May 1986 – 20 August 1988
- Prime Minister: Hun Sen
- Preceded by: Chan Phin
- Succeeded by: Taing Sarim

Member of Parliament for Siem Reap
- Incumbent
- Assumed office 2003

Personal details
- Born: 5 January 1947 (age 79)
- Party: Cambodian People's Party

Ho Non (Khmer: ហូ ណូន, born 5 January 1947) is a Cambodian politician. She belongs to the Cambodian People's Party and was elected to represent Kandal Province in the National Assembly of Cambodia in 2003.
