= Dul Koeun =

Cambodian politician

Member of the National Assembly
- Incumbent
- Assumed office 2003
- Constituency: Battambang

Personal details
- Born: Cambodia
- Party: Cambodian People's Party

Dul Koeun is a Cambodian politician. He belongs to the Cambodian People's Party and was elected to represent Battambang in the National Assembly of Cambodia in 2003.
