= Try Chheang Huot =

Cambodian politician (died 2015)

Try Chheang Huot (Khmer: ទ្រី ឈាងហ៊ួត, died 14 June 2015) was a Cambodian politician. He belongs to the Cambodian People's Party and was elected to represent Banteay Meanchey in the National Assembly of Cambodia in 2003. He served 2 terms as a member of parliament and the chairman of Commission on Planning, Investment, Agriculture, Rural Development, Environment, and Water Resources from 2003 to 2013. He died on June 14, 2015, in Battambang, Cambodia, after treatments failed in Thailand. His funeral was held for seven days in Battambang. Huot was buried at his Battambang residence alongside his deceased wife and parents. At the time of his death he is survived by four children and seven grandchildren.
