= Duong Vanna =

Cambodian politician

Duong Vanna (Khmer: ដួង វណ្ណា) is a Cambodian politician. She belongs to the Cambodian People's Party and was elected to represent Svay Rieng Province in the National Assembly of Cambodia in 2003.
