= Chea Poch =

Cambodian politician

Chea Poch (Khmer: ជា ប៉ូច, born 2 January 1974) is a Cambodian politician. He belongs to the Sam Rainsy Party and was elected to represent Prey Veng Province in the National Assembly of Cambodia in 2003.
