= Pal Sam Oeun =

Cambodian politician

Pal Sam Oeun (Khmer: ប៉ាល់ សំអឿន) is a Cambodian politician. He belongs to Cambodian People's Party and was elected to represent Banteay Meanchey in the National Assembly of Cambodia in 2003.
