= Ly Kim Leang =

Cambodian politician

Ly Kim Leang (Khmer: លី គឹមលៀង) is a Cambodian politician. She belongs to the Cambodian People's Party and was elected to represent Battambang in the National Assembly of Cambodia in 2003.
