= 2013 Cambodian general election =

- 28 July 2013
- All 123 seats in the National Assembly; 62 seats needed for a majority
- Turnout: 69.61% (▼5.47pp)
Party	Leader	Vote %	Seats	+/–
CPP	Chea Sim (Note: Hun Sen was the CPP's official prime ministerial candidate and leading figure throughout the campaign.)	48.83	68	−22
CNRP	Sam Rainsy	44.46	55	+26
This lists parties that won seats. See the complete results below.
Results by province
Prime Minister before	Prime Minister after
Hun Sen; CPP	Hun Sen; CPP

General elections were held in Cambodia on 28 July 2013. The National Election Committee (NEC) announced that some 9.67 million Cambodians were eligible to cast their ballots to elect the 123-seat National Assembly. Voter turnout was reported to be 69.6%, a record low for a general election. Polling precincts opened 7:00 a.m. and closed at 3:00 p.m. The Cambodian Minister of Information, Khieu Kanharith announced in preliminary results that the Cambodian People's Party won 68 seats and the opposition Cambodia National Rescue Party won all the remaining 55 seats. This election marked the largest seat loss by the Cambodian People's Party to date, and their lowest share of seats since 1998.

== Background ==
The previous general elections in 2008 were won by the Cambodian People's Party, which managed to secure an absolute majority of the seats: 90 out of 123. Despite winning a parliamentary majority, the CPP chose to form a coalition with the royalist FUNCINPEC, which won 2 seats. The opposition Sam Rainsy Party and Human Rights Party won a combined total of 29 seats. In 2012, the two parties merged to form the Cambodian National Rescue Party. However, party leader Sam Rainsy was barred from running as a candidate because he was not registered to vote. The voter roll was finalised on 31 December 2012, at which time Rainsy was living abroad after being controversially convicted in 2010 of making changes to a map to suggest the country was losing land to neighbouring Vietnam. Rainsy returned to Cambodia in July 2013 after he received a royal pardon from King Norodom Sihamoni, but Rainsy failed to have his name reinstated on the voter roll and was not eligible for candidacy in the election.

== Debates ==
Cambodia had its first televised debate on 20 and 21 July. The US-funded National Democratic Institute also sponsored nine town hall-style debates with provincial candidates from almost all parties.

== Conduct ==
=== Voting eligibility issues ===
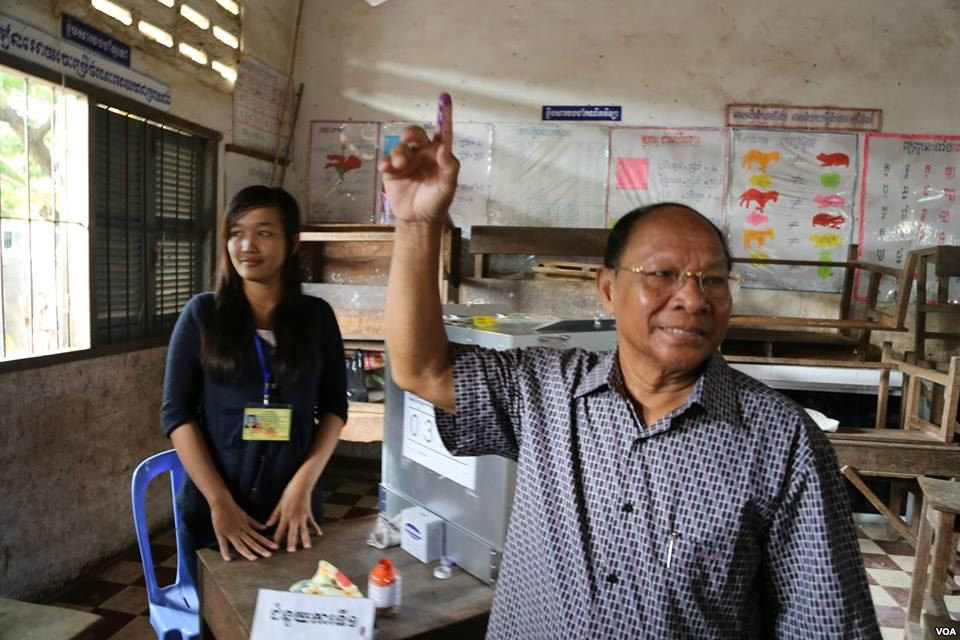
National Assembly president Heng Samrin at a polling station in Kampong Cham province.

Since Cambodia had had no official population count for the last five years, the country's population figure is merely guesswork, which has led to incorrect projections of possible voters – making it difficult for the National Election Commission to ascertain the number of actual voters that should be listed in Cambodia's voting rolls. The lack of actual population count could have led to fraudulent voting, such as voters voting in multiple precincts using different names. According to the opposition CNRP, between 1.2 and 1.3 million names were omitted from voting rolls.

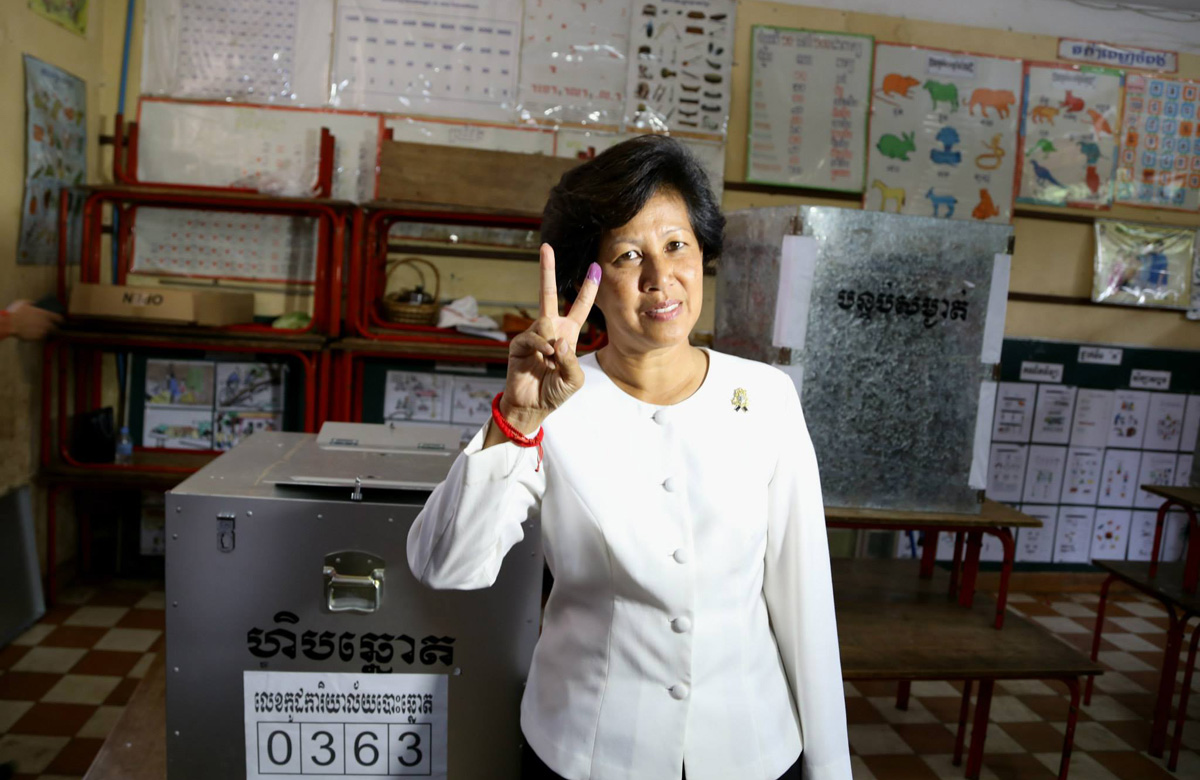
Princess Norodom Arunrasmy poses for a photo after casting her vote.

Migrant Vietnamese have also allegedly been able to register as voters due to lax identification policies in Cambodia. The opposition Cambodia National Rescue Party played up this anti-Vietnamese rhetoric in campaigning leading up to the election.

=== Indelible ink ===
One of the controversies that beset the Cambodian election before it even began was the use of an ostensibly indelible ink that was used to mark which voters had already voted. The ink had previously been donated by the Indian Embassy in Cambodia. Documentation by poll monitors before the election demonstrated the ink could simply be washed off using bleach or lime juice in minutes upon drying. The ink used could have perhaps allowed voters to vote more than once.

== Results ==
The ruling CPP party received 48.83% of the votes, earned 68 seats, while the CNRP party won 55 seats with 44.46% of the vote. By losing 22 seats from the previous election, the CPP earned the fewest percentage of seats that it has had in the National Assembly since 1998. Other parties, including the Funcinpec Party and League for Democracy Party combined for 0 seats on 6.3% of the vote.

Party	Votes	%	Seats	+/–
Cambodian People's Party	3,235,969	48.83	68	–22
Cambodia National Rescue Party	2,946,176	44.46	55	+26
FUNCINPEC	242,413	3.66	0	–2
League for Democracy Party	68,389	1.03	0	0
Khmer Anti-Poverty Party	43,222	0.65	0	0
Cambodian Nationality Party	38,123	0.58	0	New
Republican Democracy Party	33,715	0.51	0	New
Khmer Economic Development Party	19,152	0.29	0	New
Total	6,627,159	100.00	123	0
Valid votes	6,627,159	98.40		
Invalid/blank votes	108,085	1.60		
Total votes	6,735,244	100.00		
Registered voters/turnout	9,675,453	69.61		
Source: National Election Committee

== Reactions ==
The CPP claimed victory in the election. The European Union and United States expressed concern about possible irregularities, with the latter's State Department spokeswoman Jen Psaki saying that "we call for a transparent and full investigation of all credible reports of irregularities. We urge all parties and their supporters to continue to act in an orderly and peaceful manner in the post-election period." Vietnam congratulated Cambodia on the success of its 5th General Elections. French Prime Minister Jean-Marc Ayrault and Australian Prime Minister Tony Abbott sent their letter of endorsement, congratulating Hun Sen on his election win.

== Aftermath ==
Though there were claims that the election would be "worthless" even before voting started, after the election, there were complaints of election fraud. Sam Rainsy, the leader of the CNRP, declared that "We will not accept the result – we cannot accept the result...The party in power cannot ignore us anymore." The international non-governmental organisation Human Rights Watch (HRW) issued a statement that read that "the ruling Cambodian People's Party (CPP) appears to have been involved in electoral fraud" and called for an "independent commission" to investigate "allegations of election fraud and other irregularities, including bias in the election machinery". Brad Adams, HRW's Asia Director, further stated that some of the fraud consisted of "senior ruling party officials appear to have been involved in issuing fake election documents and fraudulently registering voters in multiple provinces." The Cambodian government denied calls by international organisations for an independent election review, while the government rejected calls for a review and the National Election Committee (NEC) denied irregularities. There were also claims of voter intimidation as the ruling party controlled the apparatus of state control.

Thousands of CNRP supporters gathered in Phnom Penh in September to protest the results.

== See also ==
- 5th National Assembly of Cambodia
