= 2003 Cambodian general election =

- 27 July 2003
- All 123 seats in the National Assembly; 62 seats needed for a majority
- Turnout: 83.22% (▼10.52pp)
Party	Leader	Vote %	Seats	+/–
CPP	Chea Sim (Note: Hun Sen was the CPP's official prime ministerial candidate and leading figure throughout the campaign.)	47.35	73	+9
FUNCINPEC	Norodom Ranariddh	20.75	26	−17
SRP	Sam Rainsy	21.87	24	+5
This lists parties that won seats. See the complete results below.
Results by provinces
Prime Minister before	Prime Minister after
Hun Sen; CPP	Hun Sen; CPP

General elections were held in Cambodia on 27 July 2003 to elect members of the National Assembly. The elections were won by the ruling Cambodian People's Party, which won a majority of 73 seats in the 123-seat parliament. However, due to the requirement for a two-thirds majority to elect a Prime Minister, a new government was not formed until July 2004 when a deal was reached with the FUNCINPEC party. Hun Sen was subsequently re-elected the post of Prime Minister.

== Background ==
Cambodia became a democracy in the early 1990s with the first democratic elections held in 1993. After both elections during the 1990s the Cambodian People's Party formed coalition governments with the royalist FUNCINPEC party. The previous elections in 1998 saw significant violence and intimidation of opposition supporters. It took place a year after FUNCINPEC had been violently ousted from the coalition government by the Cambodian People's Party. However following the election they once more formed a coalition with Hun Sen as Prime Minister and FUNCINPEC's leader Prince Norodom Ranarridh, the son of King Norodom Sihanouk, as his deputy.

In local elections in 2002 the Cambodian People's Party performed strongly leading in 1,597 of the 1,621 communes of Cambodia. Meanwhile, FUNCINPEC suffered a setback dropping to only 22% of the vote.

== Campaign ==
The run-up to the election saw some violence including the killing of a judge and a royalist politician, however it was much reduced from previous elections. During the campaign the United States Secretary of State Colin Powell visited Cambodia, met all three main party leaders and called on all parties to have fair coverage in the media. The opposition were able to get some time on television during the campaign, but there were many reports in rural areas of voters being intimidated by the Cambodian People's Party. In total 22 parties contested the election but only three were seen as real contenders in the election.

The Cambodian People's Party had control of much of the media in Cambodia, the most money and a superior party machine. The party campaigned on the economic development they said that they were bringing to Cambodia and in the March before the election they announced a 1.5 billion dollar program to counter poverty. The party and their leader Hun Sen won support from voters due to their presiding over the most peaceful period in the countries recent history after ending the rule of the Khmer Rouge. The party had the strongest support in rural areas of Cambodia, but younger voters in urban areas were more desirous of change and therefore supportive of the opposition.

The two main opposition parties criticised the government of Hun Sen for its corruption and pledged to improve health and education in Cambodia. FUNCINPEC called for reform of the economy and for more foreign investment, but their leader, Norodom Ranariddh, was seen as being ineffective and his party's popularity was in decline. Meanwhile, the Sam Rainsy Party criticised corruption, pledged more money for health, education and civil servant pay and attempted to attract the poor. The party had grown in strength since the previous election but their leader Sam Rainsy was seen as being authoritarian.

== Results ==
Voter turnout in the election was high with over 80% casting ballots. The results saw the Cambodian People's Party win a clear majority of seats but fell short of the two-thirds majority required in order to elect a Prime Minister on their own. FUNCINPEC lost ground dropping from the 31% they had won in 1998 to only just over 20% this time, while the Sam Rainsy Party rose to 22% from 14% in 1998.

Party	Votes	%	Seats	+/–
Cambodian People's Party	2,447,259	47.35	73	+9
FUNCINPEC	1,072,313	20.75	26	–17
Sam Rainsy Party	1,130,423	21.87	24	+9
Khmer Democratic Party	95,927	1.86	0	0
The Rice Party	76,086	1.47	0	New
Indra Buddra Party	62,338	1.21	0	New
Khmer Soul Party	56,010	1.08	0	New
Cambodian Development Party	36,838	0.71	0	New
Khmer Angkor Party	26,385	0.51	0	0
Cambodian Women's Party	23,538	0.46	0	New
Khmer Front Party	20,272	0.39	0	New
Khmer Unity Party	18,309	0.35	0	0
Hang Dara Democratic Movement Party	15,671	0.30	0	New
Khmer Spiritual Aspiration Party	14,342	0.28	0	New
Kon Khmer Party	14,018	0.27	0	New
Union of National Solidarity Party	11,676	0.23	0	New
Khmer Help Khmer	9,482	0.18	0	New
Farmer's Party	9,449	0.18	0	New
Molinaka and the Khmer Freedom Fighters Party	6,808	0.13	0	0
Cambodian Free Independent Democratic Party	6,806	0.13	0	New
Khmer Citizens' Party	6,526	0.13	0	0
National Khmer Party	4,232	0.08	0	New
Liberal Democratic Party	4,129	0.08	0	0
Total	5,168,837	100.00	123	+1
Valid votes	5,168,837	97.94		
Invalid/blank votes	108,657	2.06		
Total votes	5,277,494	100.00		
Registered voters/turnout	6,341,834	83.22		
Source: IFES, EU

== Aftermath ==
Following the election, FUNCINPEC and the Sam Rainsy Party refused to attend parliament and formed an "Alliance of Democrats" in order to block Hun Sen from being elected Prime Minister again. They rejected the official results and said that they had been manipulated by the Cambodian People's Party. After initially boycotting parliament the two parties were persuaded by the King to attend the swearing in at the end of September, but remained firm in rejecting joining a government led by Hun Sen. However, despite no government being formed, a caretaker administration run by Hun Sen and the Cambodian People's Party was able to continue.

A provisional agreement was said to have been reached in November on a three party government led by Hun Sen but the opposition later denied this. Personal dislike between the three parties and the opposition of the Cambodia People's Party to a three party government meant negotiations on forming a government dragged on into 2004. Eventually, 11 months after the election, towards the end of June 2004 the Cambodia People's Party and FUNCINPEC reached an agreement under which ministerial seats would be divided up 60-40 between them and Hun Sen would remain Prime Minister. On the 15 July 2004 the Cambodian parliament finally approved the new government with 96 of the 123 members voting in favour. There was a significant increase in the number of ministers to 207, including 7 deputy prime ministers and 180 cabinet ministers, in order to reach agreement on the new government.

== See also ==
- 3rd National Assembly of Cambodia

== Literature ==
- Sorpong Peou (2006), "Consolidation or Crisis of Democracy?: Cambodia's Parliamentary Elections in 2003 and Beyond", Between Consolidation and Crisis: Elections and Democracy in Five Nations in Southeast Asia, Berlin: Lit, pp. 41–83
