= Candlelight Party =

Candlelight Party គណបក្សភ្លើងទៀន
- Abbreviation: CLP
- President: Teav Vannol
- Vice Presidents: Thach Setha; Son Chhay; Rong Chhun
- Founder: Sam Rainsy
- Founded: 2 November 1995; 30 years ago
- Split from: FUNCINPEC
- Headquarters: Sangkat Veal Sbov, Khan Chbar Ampov, Phnom Penh, Cambodia
- Ideology: Liberalism; Liberal democracy Progressivism
- Political position: Centre to centre-left
- National affiliation: Alliance Towards the Future
- Regional affiliation: Council of Asian Liberals and Democrats
- Slogan: "សីលធម៌ សច្ចធម៌ យុត្តិធម៌" ("Integrity, Truth, Justice")
- Senate: 0 / 62
- National Assembly: 0 / 125
- Commune chiefs: 4 / 1,652
- Commune councillors: 2,198 / 11,622

Website
- candlelightparty.org, candlelightparty.info/en/

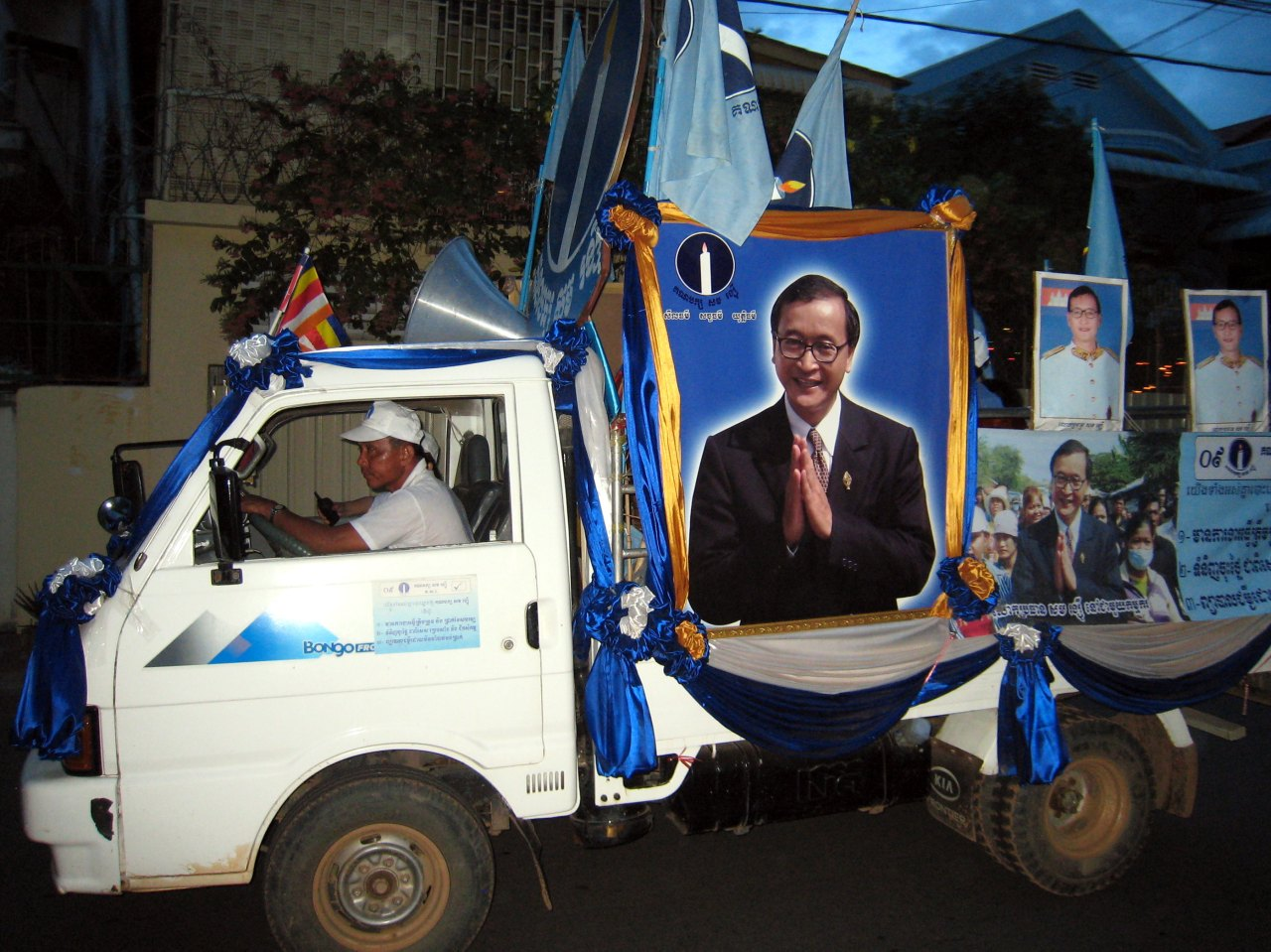
Sam Rainsy campaign bus during the 2008 election

The Candlelight Party (Khmer: គណបក្សភ្លើងទៀន, UNGEGN: Kônâbâks Phleung Tiĕn, ALA-LC: Gaṇapaks Bhloeng Dian [keanapaʔ pʰləːŋ tiən]) is a liberal party in Cambodia. The party was a member of the Council of Asian Liberals and Democrats, Liberal International, and the Alliance of Democrats. It is the largest opposition party in Cambodia, and the main challenger to the ruling Cambodian People's Party. The party, which would have been the only competitive opposition party to the CPP, was disqualified from running in the 2023 election by the National Election Committee despite previously being permitted to participate in the 2022 local elections. The party resumed political activity in October 2021 after having been inactive since 2012.

The party, founded in 1995 as the Khmer Nation Party, renamed the Sam Rainsy Party in 1998, and it was renamed the Candlelight Party in 2018. This party is currently the official opposition to the ruling Cambodian People's Party. Since the decline of the junior coalition partner, FUNCINPEC, in the 2008 National Assembly elections, the Candlelight Party is now considered the second largest party and the largest opposition party in Cambodia. The party won 15 of the 123 seats in the National Assembly in the 1998 elections, 24 seats in the 2003 elections, and 26 seats in the 2008 elections. The CP won two seats in the 2006 Senate elections. In 2009, it formally allied with the Human Rights Party in the Democratic Movement of Change.

In 2008, party activist Tuot Saron was arrested on a charge of "being an accomplice to unlawful confinement". International human rights groups including Human Rights Watch and Amnesty International described the charges as a politically motivated attempt to intimidate other SRP activists. Tuot Saron was released on 26 November 2010, following a Royal Pardon decree. In July 2024, Candlelight Party President Teav Vannol was fined 6 billion riels (approximately $1.5 million) for “defaming” the Cambodian government to foreign media.

== Election results ==
=== General elections ===
Election	Leader	Votes			Seats		Position	Government
Election	Leader	#	%	±	#	±	Position	Government
1998	Sam Rainsy	699,665	14.3	New	15 / 122	New	▲3rd	CPP–FUNCINPEC
2003	Sam Rainsy	1,130,423	21.9	▲7.6	24 / 123	▲9	3rd	CPP–FUNCINPEC
2008	Sam Rainsy	1,316,714	21.9	Steady	26 / 123	▲2	▲2nd	CPP–FUNCINPEC

=== Communal elections ===
Election	Leader	Votes			Chiefs		Councillors		Position
Election	Leader	#	%	±	#	±	#	±	Position
2002	Sam Rainsy	736,454	16.9	New	13 / 1,621	New	1,329 / 11,261	New	▲3rd
2007	Sam Rainsy	1,303,906	25.2	▲8.3	28 / 1,621	▲15	2,660 / 11,353	▲1,331	▲2nd
2012	Sam Rainsy	1,224,460	20.8	▼4.4	22 / 1,633	▼6	2,155 / 11,459	▼505	2nd
2017	Teav Vannol	Did not contest			0 / 1,646	▼22	0 / 11,572	▼2,155	—N/a
2022	Teav Vannol	1,610,556	22.2	▲22.2	4 / 1,652	▲4	2,198 / 11,622	▲2,198	▲2nd

=== Senate elections ===
Election	Leader	Votes			Seats		Position	Outcome
Election	Leader	#	%	±	#	±	Position	Outcome
2006	Kong Korm	1,165	10.3	—	2 / 57	▼5	3rd	Minority
2012	Kong Korm	2,503	21.9	▲11.6	11 / 57	▲9	▲2nd	Minority

== See also ==
- Category:Candlelight Party politicians
- Liberalism
- Contributions to liberal theory
- Liberalism worldwide
- List of liberal parties
- Liberal democracy
