= 2012 Cambodian Senate election =

- 29 January 2012
- 57 of the 61 seats in the Senate (Note: 4 seats are appointed, 2 by the National Assembly, 2 by the Monarch); 29 seats needed for a majority
- Turnout: 99.49% (▲2.04pp)
Party	Leader	Vote %	Seats	+/–
CPP	Chea Sim	77.81	46	+1
SRP	Sam Rainsy (Note: Sam Rainsy Party named Kong Korm as its leading candidate, however Sam Rainsy was the central leading figure throughout the election.)	21.93	11	+9
Independent	-	(Note: Independent candidates are not elected but appointed by either the monarch or National Assembly)	4	0
This lists parties that won seats. See the complete results below.
Results by Region
President of the Senate before	President of the Senate after
Chea Sim; CPP	Chea Sim; CPP

Senate elections were held in Cambodia were held on 29 January 2012, with all 57 seats in the Senate being contested. The result was a victory for the ruling Cambodian People's Party, which won 46 of the 57 seats. The Sam Rainsy Party gain a net of eleven seats, ending with a total of 11 seats. The royalist FUNCINPEC lost all of its nine seats.

== Electoral system ==
The Senate of Cambodia is elected every 6 years by an indirect party-list proportional representation through 8 multi-member constituencies (regions). Seats are allocated by the D'hondt method. As this is an indirect election, citizens do not have the right to vote, where the right to vote is given to Communal Chiefs, Communal Councilors, and members of the National Assembly.

Regions	Provinces	Seats
Region 1	Phnom Penh	6
Region 2	Kampong Cham, Tboung Khmum	8
Region 3	Kandal	5
Region 4	Banteay Meachey, Battambang, Siem Reap, Pailin, Oddar Meanchey	10
Region 5	Kampot, Kep, Takeo	7
Region 6	Prey Veng, Svay Rieng	7
Region 7	Kampong Chhnang, Kampong Speu, Preah Sihanouk, Koh Kong, Pursat	8
Region 8	Kampong Thom, Preah Vihear, Kratie, Strung Treng, Ratanakiri, Mondulkiri	6

== Results ==
Party	Votes	%	Seats	+/–
Cambodian People's Party	8,880	78.01	46	+1
Sam Rainsy Party	2,503	21.99	11	+9
Appointed members			4	0
Total	11,383	100.00	61	0
Valid votes	11,383	99.75		
Invalid/blank votes	29	0.25		
Total votes	11,412	100.00		
Registered voters/turnout	11,470	99.49		
Source: RFA, IPU

== List of senators ==
Name	Gender	Party/Nomination
Oum Mannorine	Male	Nominated by King
Ieu Pannakar	Male	Nominated by King
Prak Cham Roeun	Male	Nominated by Assembly
Norodom Buppha Devi	Female	Nominated by Assembly
Chhat Loeum	Male	Cambodian People's Party
Soeuy Keo	Male	Cambodian People's Party
Chhoun Leng	Male	Cambodian People's Party
Bou Thang	Male	Cambodian People's Party
Chea Son	Male	Cambodian People's Party
Ty Borasy	Female	Cambodian People's Party
Hong Touhay	Male	Cambodian People's Party
Thong Chon	Male	Cambodian People's Party
Tith Ream	Male	Cambodian People's Party
Ouk Bounchheoun	Male	Cambodian People's Party
Soun Loan	Male	Cambodian People's Party
Yang Sem	Male	Cambodian People's Party
Lav Mingkan	Male	Cambodian People's Party
Kim Naing	Male	Cambodian People's Party
Lak Aun	Female	Cambodian People's Party
Chan Nareth	Male	Cambodian People's Party
Um Sarith	Male	Cambodian People's Party
Chhit Kimyeat	Male	Cambodian People's Party
Kong Sareach	Male	Cambodian People's Party
Pum Sichan	Female	Cambodian People's Party
Lay Ypisith	Male	Cambodian People's Party
Chea Cheth	Male	Cambodian People's Party
Sim Ka	Male	Cambodian People's Party
Ney Pena	Male	Cambodian People's Party
Peng Path	Male	Cambodian People's Party
Puth Khov	Male	Cambodian People's Party
Ok Kong	Male	Cambodian People's Party
Ung Ty	Male	Cambodian People's Party
Am Sam Ath	Male	Cambodian People's Party
An Sum	Male	Cambodian People's Party
Yim Set	Male	Cambodian People's Party
Tim Phan	Male	Cambodian People's Party
Nuon Samin	Male	Cambodian People's Party
Men Siphan	Male	Cambodian People's Party
Kok An	Male	Cambodian People's Party
Mong Reththy	Male	Cambodian People's Party
Vann Vuth	Male	Cambodian People's Party
Chhouk Chhim	Female	Cambodian People's Party
Keo Maly	Female	Cambodian People's Party
Men Sam An	Female	Cambodian People's Party
Mam Bunneang	Male	Cambodian People's Party
Ly Yong Phat	Male	Cambodian People's Party
Heng Bora	Male	Cambodian People's Party
Kong Korm	Male	Sam Rainsy Party
Nuth Rumduol	Male	Sam Rainsy Party
Ho Vann	Male	Sam Rainsy Party
Thach Setha	Male	Sam Rainsy Party
Thak Lany	Female	Sam Rainsy Party
Teav Vannol	Male	Sam Rainsy Party
Hong Sok Hour	Male	Sam Rainsy Party
Men Sothavarin	Male	Sam Rainsy Party
Ke Sovannroth	Female	Sam Rainsy Party
Eng Chhai Eang	Male	Sam Rainsy Party
Uch Serey Yuth	Male	Sam Rainsy Party
