= Kampuchean People's Revolutionary Party =

Ruling Political Party in Cambodia (1979–1991)

Kampuchean People's Revolutionary Party បក្សប្រជាជនបដិវត្តន៍កម្ពុជា។
- Khmer name: បក្សប្រជាជនបដិវត្តន៍កម្ពុជា។
- Abbreviation: KPRP
- General Secretary: 1979–1981: Pen Sovan; 1981–1991: Heng Samrin (Note: Sometime during his leadership Chea Sim and Hun Sen became the de facto leaders of the party.)
- Governing body: National Committee; Politburo
- Chairman of the Central Organization Committee: Ney Pena
- Founded: 5 January 1979 (47 years, 288 days)
- Dissolved: 17 October 1991 (35 years, 3 days)
- Split from: Communist Party of Kampuchea (de facto)
- Succeeded by: Cambodian People's Party
- Headquarters: Phnom Penh
- Youth wing: People's Revolutionary Youth Union of Kampuchea
- Armed wing: Kampuchean People's Revolutionary Armed Forces
- Membership: 600-4,000 (Mid-1981); 7,500-37,000 (1985)
- Ideology: Communism; Marxism–Leninism; Socialist patriotism; Proletarian internationalism; Reformist socialism; Revolutionary nationalism; Anti-ultranationalism; Anti-chauvinism
- Political position: Far-left
- National affiliation: FUNSK (1979–1981); KUFNCD (1981–1991)
- Slogan: "ភាពជាអ្នកជិតខាងល្អ មិត្តភាពប្រពៃណី កិច្ចសហប្រតិបត្តិការគ្រប់ជ្រុងជ្រោយ និងនិរន្តរភាពយូរអង្វែង" ("Good neighborliness, traditional friendship, comprehensive cooperation and long-term sustainability")
- National Assembly (1981): 117 / 117

Party flag

The Kampuchean People's Revolutionary Party (KPRP; Khmer: បក្សប្រជាជនបដិវត្តន៍កម្ពុជា។) was the ruling party of Cambodia from 1979 until 1991. It was founded on 5 January 1979 and rebranded as the Cambodian People's Party on 17 October 1991.

== History ==
=== Background ===
Tou Samouth founded on 21 September 1951, the Kampuchean People's Revolutionary Party, this party existed until 30 September 1960, being replaced with the Workers Party of Kampuchea, in 1966 renamed Communist Party of Kampuchea. The CPK had three factions which engaded in an internal power struggle between 1975 and 1979. One of these three factions was the Pro-Vietnam faction which was opposed to Pol Pot and his faction. After a series of violent purges in 1978, members of the Pro-Vietnam faction like Heng Samrin and Chea Sim fled to the Socialist Republic of Vietnam. On 2 December 1978 the National United Front for Salvation Army was succeeded by the Kampuchean United Front for National Salvation, it members included Heng Samrin (Chairman/President), Chea Sim (Vice President), Pen Sovann and Hun Sen. The FUNSK had its own territory called Liberated Area of Cambodia. The Liberated Area of Cambodia helped Vietnam in the Cambodian–Vietnamese War through the FUNSK.

=== Founding ===
On 5 January 1979, while the fight against Democratic Kampuchea was still ongoing, the Cambodian communists who split from the Communist Party of Kampuchea held a congress. At this gathering, they declared themselves the true successors of the original KPRP founded in 1951 and labelled the congress as the Third Party Congress, thus not recognizing the 1963, 1975 and 1978 congresses of CPK as legitimate. The party considered 28 June 1951 as its founding date.

=== Pen Sovan's leadership (1979–1981) ===
A national committee led by Pen Sovann and Roh Samai was appointed by the Congress. The women's wing of the party, the National Association of Women for the Salvation of Kampuchea, was established in 1979 with a vast national network of members that extended to the district level. Two days after Phnom Penh was captured and one day after the Kampuchean People's Revolutionary Council Government was established, with the KPRP becoming the ruling party, its headquarters were then established in Phnom Penh.

The existence of the party was kept secret until its 4th congress in May 1981, when it appeared publicly and assumed the name KPRP. The name change was stated to be carried out "to clearly distinguish it from the reactionary Pol Pot party and to underline and reassert the continuity of the party's best traditions".

=== Heng Samrin's leadership (1981–1991) ===
As of 1990, members of the Politburo were Heng Samrin (General Secretary), Chea Sim, Hun Sen, Chea Soth, Math Ly, Tea Banh, Men Sam An, Nguon Nhel, Sar Kheng, Bou Thang, Ney Pena, Say Chhum and alternate members included Sing Song, Sim Ka and Pol Saroeun. Members of the Secretariat were Heng Samrin, Say Phouthang, Bou Thang, Men Sam An and Sar Kheng.

=== Rebranding ===
On 17 October 1991, the party changed its name to Cambodian People's Party, the next day the party switched from communism to authoritarian conservatism and economical between a mixed economy and a laissez-faire free market economy, besides the fact that the KPRP already advocated for free market reforms from 1988 on.

== Ideology ==
The party supported communism and adopted Marxism-Leninism, further the party made it clear that they support proletarian internationalism, socialist patriotism and that they rejected ultranationalism. Besides their rejection of ultranationalism, the party was supportive of revolutionary nationalism. After 1991, the party rebranded and began to embrace reformist socialism. The party and its government viewed Pol Pot and Norodom Sihanouk as reactionary, with Hun Sen saying in 1979 following about Sihanouk "This reactionary prince always cooperates with imperialists and world reactionaries against the Kampuchean revolution.". While Hun Sen's membership he hasn't been considered to be a devout communist but rather a pragmatist. Chea Sim was described to be a traditionalist and a strong nationalist, besides the party's rejection of ultranationalism.

== Factions ==
The Kampuchean People's Revolutionary Party had three factions, one was built around Heng Samrin, another one around Chea Sim and the third around Hun Sen.

== List of Secretary-Generals/General Secretaries ==
KPRP (General Secretary)

No.	Portrait	Name (Birth–Death)	Term of office			Vices/Deputies
No.	Portrait	Name (Birth–Death)	From	To	Duration	Vices/Deputies
1		Pen Sovan ប៉ែន សុវណ្ណ (1936–2016)	5 January 1979	5 December 1981	2 years, 334 days	―
2		Heng Samrin ហេង សំរិន (born 1934)	5 December 1981	17 October 1991	9 years, 316 days	―
– (De facto)		Chea Sim ជា ស៊ីម (1932–2015) and Hun Sen ហ៊ុន សែន (born 1952)	Sometime during Samrin's leadership	c. 17 October 1991	c. 9 years, 316 days	―

== See also ==
- Party of Democratic Kampuchea
- Cambodian National Unity Party
- Khmer National Solidarity Party
