= 2018 Cambodian Senate election =

- 25 February 2018
- 58 of the 62 seats in the Senate (Note: 4 seats are appointed, 2 by the National Assembly, 2 by the Monarch); 31 seats needed for a majority
- Turnout: 99.79% (▲0.30pp)
Party	Leader	Vote %	Seats	+/–
CPP	Hun Sen (Note: The Cambodian People's Party named Say Chhum as its leading candidate, however Hun Sen was the central leading figure throughout the election.)	96.05	58	+12
FUNCINPEC	Norodom Ranariddh	2.37	2	+2
Independent	-	(Note: Independent candidates are not elected but appointed by either the monarch or National Assembly)	2	−2
This lists parties that won seats. See the complete results below.

President of the Senate before	President of the Senate after
Say Chhum; CPP	Say Chhum; CPP

Senate elections were held in Cambodia on 25 February 2018 after being postponed from 14 January 2018. For the first time, the Senate and parliamentary elections occurred in the same year. The result was a victory for the CPP, which won all 58 seats. King Norodom Sihamoni nominated Princess Norodom Arunrasmy and Oum Somanin to the Senate.

== Background ==
On 11 February 2017, Rainsy resigned as President of the CNRP, and was succeeded by Sokha. On 3 September, Sokha was arrested and charged with treason, raising questions about the party's future. Another act of repression by the government was the closure of the Cambodia Daily newspaper. On 16 November 2017, the CNRP was forcibly dissolved, eliminating any real challenge to the long-ruling CPP. Its seats in parliament were distributed to three other parties. The CNRP was dissolved and revoked the voting rights of its commune councilors and parliamentarians, leading to the arrest of Kem Sokha, a leader of the CNRP, who was arrested on charges of conspiring to overthrow the government with the help of the US. The US and Khem Sokha have both denied the allegations.

== Electoral system ==
The Senate of Cambodia is elected every 6 years by an indirect party-list proportional representation through 8 multi members constituencies (regions), with the Communal Chiefs, Communal Councilors, Members of the National Assembly.

Regions	Seats
Region 1	6
Region 2	8
Region 3	5
Region 4	10
Region 5	7
Region 6	7
Region 7	9
Region 8	6

Regions	Provinces
Region 1	Phnom Penh
Region 2	Kampong Cham, Tboung Khmum
Region 3	Kandal
Region 4	Banteay Meachey, Battambang, Siem Reap, Pailin, Oddar Meanchey
Region 5	Kampot, Kep, Takeo
Region 6	Prey Veng, Svay Rieng
Region 7	Kampong Chhnang, Kampong Speu, Preah Sihanouk, Koh Kong, Pursat
Region 8	Kampong Thom, Preah Vihear, Kratie, Strung Treng, Ratanakiri, Mondulkiri

== Conduct ==
According to the National Election Committee (NEC), three political parties running in next week's Senate election have done virtually little campaigning, which NGOs attribute to the dissolution of the main opposition party. The Cambodian Youth Party, the Khmer National United Party, and FUNCIPEC are these parties. Sotheara Yoeurng, legal and monitoring officer of the Cambodian Committee for Free and Fair Elections, claimed the three parties were scarcely campaigning owing to the dissolution of the CNRP. Prior to the next Senate election on February 25, the NEC has prohibited all political parties from campaigning on nine key boulevards in Phnom Penh.

The Ballot was arranged in the order of the following:

Ballot Numbers	Parties
1)	CPP
2)	CYP
3)	KNUP
4)	FUNCINPEC

== Results ==
Party	Votes	%	Seats	+/–
Cambodian People's Party	11,202	96.05	58	+12
FUNCINPEC	276	2.37	0	New
Khmer National United Party	182	1.56	0	New
Cambodian Youth Party	3	0.03	0	New
Members appointed by National Assembly			2	0
Members appointed by Monarch			2	0
Total	11,663	100.00	62	+1
Valid votes	11,663	99.94		
Invalid/blank votes	7	0.06		
Total votes	11,670	100.00		
Registered voters/turnout	11,695	99.79		
Source: Khmer Times

=== Results by region ===
Province	CPP			FUNCINPEC			KNUP			CYP			Total
Province	Votes	%	Seats	Votes	%	Seats	Votes	%	Seats	Votes	%	Seats	Total
Region 1	897	98.57%	6	11	1.21%	0	2	0.22%	0	0	0%	0	910
Region 2	1,305	95.33%	8	45	3.29%	0	16	1.17%	0	3	0.22%	0	1,369
Region 3	871	94.37%	5	44	4.77%	0	8	0.87%	0	0	0%	0	923
Region 4	2,054	92.77%	10	81	3.66%	0	79	3.57%	0	0	0%	0	2,214
Region 5	1,324	98.95%	7	14	1.05%	0	0	0%	0	0	0%	0	1,338
Region 6	1,395	97.83%	7	18	1.26%	0	13	0.91%	0	0	0%	0	1,426
Region 7	1,682	97.23%	9	32	1.85%	0	16	0.92%	0	0	0%	0	1,730
Region 8	1,674	95.49%	6	47	2.68%	0	32	1.83%	0	0	0%	0	1,753
Source: NEC

=== Results by province ===
Province	CPP		KNUP		FUNCINPEC		CYP		Invalid Votes	
Province	Votes	%	Votes	%	Votes	%	%	Votes	Votes	%
Banteay Meanchey	478	91.75%	29	5.57%	14	2.69%	0	0%	0	0%
Battambang	768	93.89%	8	0.98%	41	5.01%	0	0%	1	0.12%
Kampong Cham	786	94.24%	13	1.56%	34	4.08%	0	0%	1	0.12%
Kampong Chhnang	416	97.65%	7	1.64%	2	0.47%	0	0%	1	0.23%
Kampong Speu	579	94.61%	23	3.76%	10	1.63%	0	0%	0	0%
Kampong Thom	541	93.12%	4	0.69%	36	6.2%	0	0%	0	0%
Kampot	559	98.94%	0	0%	5	0.88%	0	0%	1	0.18%
Kandal	871	94.37%	8	0.87%	44	4.77%	0	0%	0	0%
Koh Kong	168	100%	0	0%	0	0%	0	0%	0	0%
Kratié	286	95.65%	10	3.34%	2	0.67%	0	0%	1	0.33%
Mondulkiri	104	99.05%	0	0%	0	0%	0	0%	1	0.95%
Phnom Penh	897	98.57%	2	0.22%	11	1.21%	0	0%	0	0%
Preah Vihear	324	97.01%	7	2.1%	3	0.9%	0	0%	0	0%
Prey Veng	874	96.79%	13	1.44%	16	1.77%	0	0%	0	0%
Pursat	346	99.71%	0	0%	1	0.29%	0	0%	0	0%
Ratanakiri	248	95.38%	11	4.23%	0	0%	0	0%	1	0.38%
Siem Reap	617	91.82%	30	4.46%	24	3.57%	0	0%	1	0.15%
Preah Sihanouk	173	94.02%	2	1.09%	9	4.89%	0	0%	0	0%
Stung Treng	171	96.61%	0	0%	6	3.39%	0	0%	0	0%
Svay Rieng	521	99.62%	0	0%	2	0.38%	0	0%	0	0%
Takéo	733	98.79%	0	0%	9	1.21%	0	0%	0	0%
Kep	32	100%	0	0%	0	0%	0	0%	0	0%
Pailin	51	96.23%	2	3.77%	0	0%	0	0%	0	0%
Oddar Meanchey	140	91.5%	10	6.54%	2	1.31%	0	0%	1	0.65%
Tboung Khmum	519	96.83%	3	0.56%	11	2.05%	3	0.56%	0	0%
Source: National Election Committee

=== Elected Senators ===
Party	Name
(Nominated by King)	Norodom Arunrasmey
(Nominated by King)	Oum Somanin
FUNCINPEC	Chea Chantevy
FUNCINPEC	Suon Mean
Cambodian People's Party	Soeuy Keo
Cambodian People's Party	Mom Chim Huy
Cambodian People's Party	Ty Borasy
Cambodian People's Party	Thong Chan
Cambodian People's Party	Ouk Bunchhoeun
Cambodian People's Party	Suon Lon
Cambodian People's Party	Yong Sem
Cambodian People's Party	Lao Meng Khin
Cambodian People's Party	Sok Yat
Cambodian People's Party	Say Chhum
Cambodian People's Party	Sok Eysan
Cambodian People's Party	Tep Ngorn
Cambodian People's Party	Chan Nareth
Cambodian People's Party	Nam Toum
Cambodian People's Party	Chhit Kimyeat
Cambodian People's Party	Kong Sarath
Cambodian People's Party	Lay Piseth
Cambodian People's Party	Chea Cheth
Cambodian People's Party	Sim Ka
Cambodian People's Party	Ney Pena
Cambodian People's Party	Kun Net
Cambodian People's Party	Ok Kong
Cambodian People's Party	Seng Siphy
Cambodian People's Party	Ok Kong
Cambodian People's Party	Pol Lim
Cambodian People's Party	Men Chhoeun
Cambodian People's Party	An Sum
Cambodian People's Party	Hem Khorn
Cambodian People's Party	Chung Kimsran
Cambodian People's Party	Khieu Muth
Cambodian People's Party	Muong Poy
Cambodian People's Party	Tim Phan
Cambodian People's Party	Choung Veng
Cambodian People's Party	Lan Chhorn
Cambodian People's Party	Chuan Leng
Cambodian People's Party	
Cambodian People's Party	Men Siphan
Cambodian People's Party	O Sokhom
Cambodian People's Party	Kok An
Cambodian People's Party	Mong Rithy
Cambodian People's Party	Prak Chamroeun
Cambodian People's Party	Nhem Samorn
Cambodian People's Party	
Cambodian People's Party	Kim Thea
Cambodian People's Party	Say Borin
Cambodian People's Party	Srey Ben
Cambodian People's Party	Sam An
Cambodian People's Party	
Cambodian People's Party	Mam Bunheang
Cambodian People's Party	Si Vanath
Cambodian People's Party	Chim Lav
Cambodian People's Party	Ly Yong Phat
Cambodian People's Party	Tep Yuthy
Cambodian People's Party	Chheuy Channa
Cambodian People's Party	Ly Sary
Cambodian People's Party	Chhay Vanna
Cambodian People's Party	Khuon Khundy
Cambodian People's Party	Heng Bora

== Reactions ==
=== FUNCINPEC ===
Nhep Bunchin, spokesman for FUNCINPEC, stated the official results did not differ from the preliminary results and that party still supports the election outcome.

=== Cambodian Youth Party ===
The CYP's President Pich Sros supported the statement made by FUNCINPEC and stated, "I don't think there was anything wrong with the election".

=== Khmer National United Party ===
Run Meatra the spokesman for the party stated, that the party supports the outcome of the election that it was free and fair.

== Aftermath ==
After the election which saw CPP hold all 58 elected seats, the King nominated Princess Norodom Arunrasmy and Oum Somanin to the Senate and the National Assembly elected two FUNCIPEC members to the Senate, bringing the 62-member legislative body dominated by the ruling Cambodian People's Party to a close.
