= 2024 Cambodian Senate election =

- 25 February 2024
- 58 of the 62 seats in the Senate (Note: 4 seats are appointed, 2 by the National Assembly, 2 by the Monarch); 31 seats needed for a majority
- Turnout: 99.86% (▲0.93pp)
Party	Leader	Vote %	Seats	+/–
CPP	Hun Sen	85.92	57	−1
KWP (Note: Though the Khmer Will Party ran as an individual party, it's candidacy represented the Alliance Towards the Future coalition.)	Kong Molika (Note: Khmer Will Party named Son Chhay as its leading candidate, however Kong Molika was the central leading figure throughout the election.)	11.92	3	+3
Independent	-	(Note: Independent candidates are not elected but appointed by either the monarch or National Assembly)	2	0
This lists parties that won seats. See the complete results below.

President of the Senate before	President of the Senate after
Say Chhum; CPP	Hun Sen; CPP

Senate elections were held in Cambodia on 25 February 2024. These were the fifth Senate elections in the country's history.

The elections saw the opposition re-enter the Senate. This also marked as the first time an opposition party successfully obtained seats in the Parliament after the CNRP's dissolution in 2017.

== Background ==
After resigning as prime minister in 2023, Hun Sen stated his intention to continue his political career as the President of the Cambodian People's Party (CPP), a member of the National Assembly, and the President of the Supreme Privy Council. After the Senate election on 25 February 2024, he announced his intention to also become President of the Senate. In recent years, major opposition parties to Hun Sen's regime have been prevented from contesting elections due to controversial court rulings. In the previous Senate elections in 2018, the CPP won all contested seats in the chamber after the dissolution of its main rival, the Cambodia National Rescue Party, which was believed to have been engineered by the government.

On 5 September 2023, the Candlelight Party (CLP) was advised by the National Election Committee (NEC) to make every effort to locate the original registration document issued by the Ministry of Interior or obtain a new one in order to be eligible to vote in the Senate election. NEC spokesman Hang Puthea suggested that CLP leaders should try to locate the missing original paperwork or appeal to the Ministry of Interior to follow the legal process in order to obtain a new original document to register the candidates and parties at the NEC. According to CLP spokesman Kimsour Phirith, party officials wrote to Interior Minister Sar Sokha to address the issue with the party's registration documentation. According to him, the party is still exerting significant effort to request that the Ministry of Interior streamline the procedure and make it simpler for political parties to register.

== Electoral system ==
The Senate of Cambodia is elected every 6 years by an indirect party-list proportional representation through 8 multi-member constituencies (regions), with the Communal Chiefs, Communal Councilors, and members of the National Assembly.

Regions	Provinces	Seats
Region 1	Phnom Penh	6
Region 2	Kampong Cham, Tboung Khmum	8
Region 3	Kandal	5
Region 4	Banteay Meachey, Battambang, Siem Reap, Pailin, Oddar Meanchey	10
Region 5	Kampot, Kep, Takeo	7
Region 6	Prey Veng, Svay Rieng	7
Region 7	Kampong Chhnang, Kampong Speu, Preah Sihanouk, Koh Kong, Pursat	9
Region 8	Kampong Thom, Preah Vihear, Kratie, Strung Treng, Ratanakiri, Mondulkiri	6

== Candidates ==
=== Members of Senate not standing for re-election ===
MP	First elected	Party	Date announced
Say Chhum	2012	CPP	26 July 2023
Sim Ka	2018	CPP	28 November 2023
Tep Ngorn	2012	CPP	28 November 2023
Lau Meng Khin	2012	CPP	28 November 2023

== Contesting Parties ==
Ballot Number	Party	Party Leader	Constituencies Contested	Seats Contested	Ref.
1	Cambodian People's Party	Hun Sen	8	58	
2	Khmer Will Party	Kong Molika	8	58	
3	FUNCINPEC	Norodom Chakravuth	8	58	
4	Nation Power Party	Sun Chanthy	8	58	

== Conduct ==
=== Allegations of irregularities ===
The Candlelight party alleged that its local councilors were targeted by attempts at intimidation and vote-buying. It added that provincial authorities aligned to the CPP were visiting Candlelight councilors asking them to stay away from polling stations or bribe them to vote for the CPP. The latter denied the claims, describing them as a "distortion of the facts."

== Results ==
Preliminary results released by the NEC showed that the CPP had won 55 of the 58 contested seats in the Senate, with the remaining four seats being filled by appointees of King Norodom Sihamoni and the National Assembly. The other three contested seats were won by the Khmer Will Party, a coalition of parties opposed to Hun Sen and a proxy of the Candlelight Party. It also showed that the opposition had lost ground in Phnom Penh to the CPP by nearly half of its votes and by 30 percent in the surrounding Kandal Province.

Party	Votes	%	Seats	+/–
Cambodian People's Party	10,052	85.92	55	-3
Khmer Will Party	1,394	11.92	3	New
Nation Power Party	234	2.00	0	New
FUNCINPEC	19	0.16	0	0
Members appointed by National Assembly			2	0
Members appointed by Monarch (Note: Two independents.)			2	0
Total	11,699	100.00	62	11730
Valid votes	11,699	99.74		
Invalid/blank votes	31	0.26		
Total votes	11,730	100.00		
Registered voters/turnout	11,747	99.86		
Source: KT, NEC, KT, VP, Xinhua

=== Results by region ===
Regions	CPP			KWP			FUNCINPEC			NPP			Blank/invalid	Total
Regions	Votes	%	Seats	Votes	%	Seats	Votes	%	Seats	Votes	%	Seats	Blank/invalid	Total
Region 1	817	90.18%	6	88	9.71%	0	1	0.11%	0	0	0.00%	0	7	
Region 2	1121	82.12%	7	239	17.51%	1	1	0.07%	0	4	0.29%	0	7	
Region 3	779	84.22%	5	130	14.05%	0	4	0.43%	0	12	1.30%	0	7	
Region 4	1191	77.95%	9	218	14.27%	1	1	0.07%	0	118	7.72%	0	7	
Region 5	1187	88.78%	7	148	11.07%	0	0	0.00%	0	2	0.15%	0	7	
Region 6	1161	82.28%	6	245	17.36%	1	1	0.07%	0	4	0.28%	0	7	
Region 7	1575	90.47%	9	151	8.67%	0	0	0.00%	0	15	0.86%	0	7	
Region 8	1501	84.99%	6	175	9.91%	0	11	0.62%	0	79	4.47%	0	7	
Total	10,117	86.99%	55	1,394	11.01%	3	19	0.15%	0	234	1.85%	0	7	11,730
Source: National Election Committee

== Reactions ==
CPP spokesperson Sok Eysan said that the election results were better than expected for the party and said that it was likely that Hun Sen would become the new Senate president once the official results are released by the NEC in April. Hun Sen was officially sworn in as Senate President following a unanimous vote by the chamber on 3 April.

Exiled opposition leader Sam Rainsy said that the minor opposition gains in the election were encouraging signs for democracy and a victory despite challenges such as fear, threats and vote-buying.
