= Parliament of Cambodia =

Bicameral legislature of Cambodia

Parliament សភាតំណាងរាស្ត្រ Saphea Tamnang Reas
- 5th Senate; 7th National Assembly

Type
- Type: Bicameral
- Houses: Senate (upper house) National Assembly (lower house)

History
- Founded: 14 June 1993

Leadership
- Monarch: Norodom Sihamoni since 14 October 2004
- Prime Minister: Hun Manet (CPP) since 22 August 2023
- President of the Senate: Hun Sen (CPP) since 3 April 2024
- President of the National Assembly: Khuon Sudary (CPP) since 22 August 2023

Structure
- Seats: 187: Senate: 62; National Assembly: 125
- Senate political groups: Elected members (58): CPP (55); KWP (3); Appointed members (4): CPP (2); Independent (2)
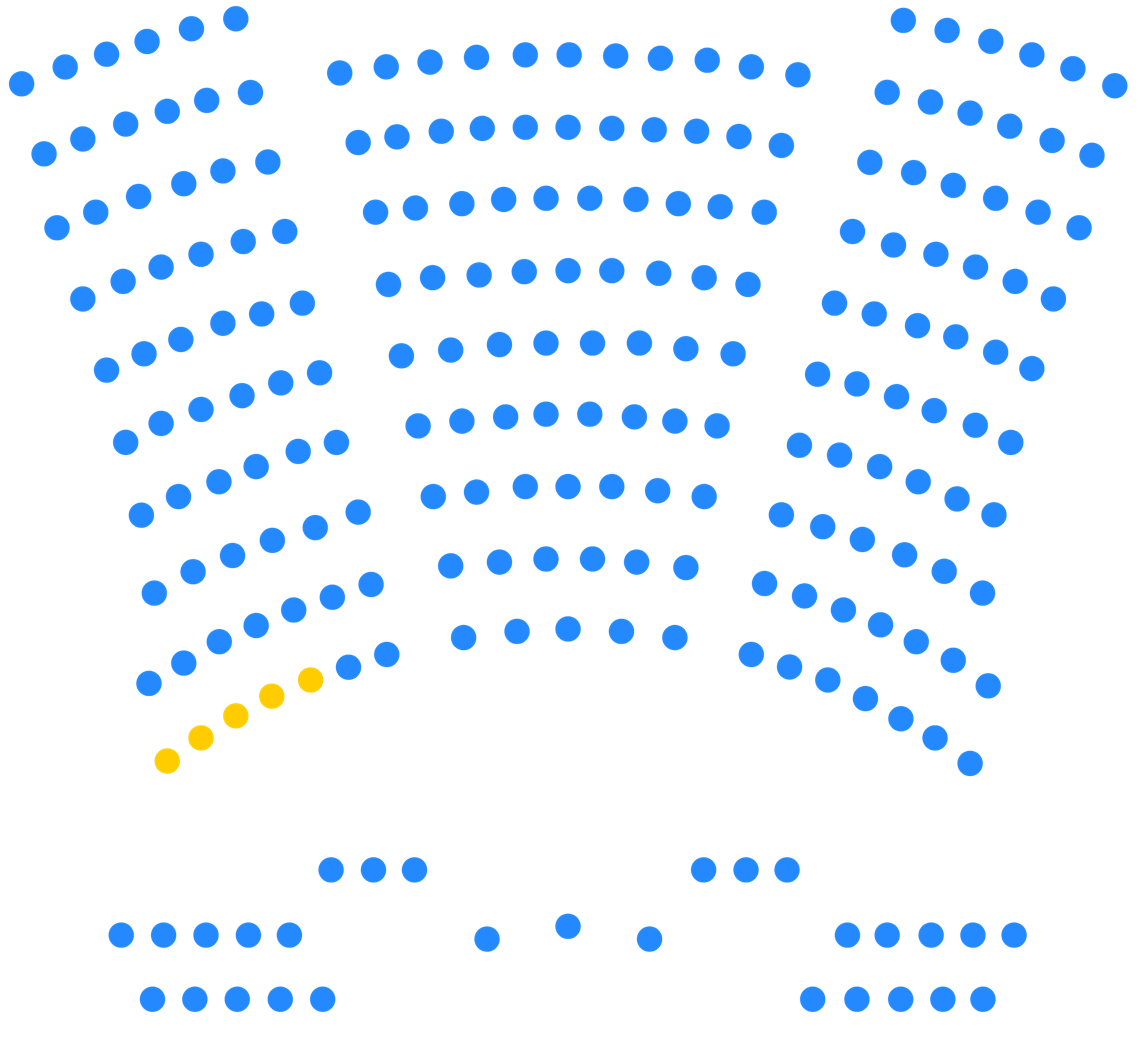
- National Assembly political groups: CPP (120); FUNCINPEC (5)

Elections
- Senate voting system: Indirect party-list proportional representation
- National Assembly voting system: Closed list proportional representation
- First Senate election: September 1972 (original) 22 January 2006 (current form)
- First National Assembly election: 23 and 28 May 1993
- Last Senate election: 25 February 2024
- Last National Assembly election: 23 July 2023

Meeting place
- Solidarity Palace, meeting place of the Cambodian Senate
- National Assembly Palace, meeting place of the Cambodian National Assembly

Website
- Senate; National Assembly

The Parliament (Khmer: សភាតំណាងរាស្ត្រ, Saphea Tamnang Reas [sapʰiə tɑmnaːŋ riəh]; lit. 'People's Representative Assembly') is the bicameral legislature of Cambodia consisting of the Senate and the National Assembly. The parliament is composed of 187 members, 125 MPs and 62 senators.

Parliament has two chambers.

- The National Assembly (រដ្ឋសភា Roatsaphea) has 125 members, elected for a five-year term by proportional representation.
- The Senate (ព្រឹទ្ធសភា Pruetsaphea) has 62 members, two of which are appointed by the king and two others by the National Assembly, and the rest elected by the Commune Councillors and members of the National Assembly.

== Composition ==
The National Assembly holds legislative power. In addition to the general law-making power, the National Assembly has specific powers regarding the national budget, taxes, administrative accounts, laws on general amnesty, international treaties and conventions, declarations of war, and the formation of the Royal Government.

== Latest elections ==
=== National Assembly (2023) ===

Party	Votes	%	Seats	+/–
Cambodian People's Party	6,398,311	82.30	120	–5
FUNCINPEC	716,490	9.22	5	+5
Khmer National United Party	134,285	1.73	0	0
Cambodian Youth Party	97,412	1.25	0	0
Dharmacracy Party	84,030	1.08	0	0
Cambodia Indigenous Peoples Democracy Party	52,817	0.68	0	0
Khmer Anti-Poverty Party	40,096	0.52	0	0
Khmer United Party	36,526	0.47	0	0
Grassroots Democratic Party	35,416	0.46	0	0
Khmer Economic Development Party	26,093	0.34	0	0
Ekpheap Cheat Khmer Party	25,261	0.32	0	New
Cambodian Nationality Party	23,197	0.30	0	0
Women for Women Party	22,843	0.29	0	New
Khmer Conservative Party	20,968	0.27	0	New
Beehive Social Democratic Party	20,210	0.26	0	0
People Purpose Party	13,831	0.18	0	New
Democracy Power Party	13,704	0.18	0	New
Farmer's Party	12,786	0.16	0	New
Total	7,774,276	100.00	125	0
Valid votes	7,774,276	94.64		
Invalid/blank votes	440,154	5.36		
Total votes	8,214,430	100.00		
Registered voters/turnout	9,710,655	84.59		
Source: National Election Committee

=== Results of seat allocation by provinces ===
Province	CPP	FUNCINPEC	Total
Banteay Meanchey	6	0	6
Battambang	8	0	8
Kampong Cham	9	1	10
Kampong Chhnang	4	0	4
Kampong Speu	6	0	6
Kampong Thom	5	1	6
Kampot	6	0	6
Kandal	10	1	11
Koh Kong	1	0	1
Kratié	3	0	3
Mondulkiri	1	0	1
Phnom Penh	11	1	12
Preah Vihear	1	0	1
Prey Veng	10	1	11
Pursat	4	0	4
Ratanakiri	1	0	1
Siem Reap	6	0	6
Preah Sihanouk	3	0	3
Stung Treng	1	0	1
Svay Rieng	5	0	5
Takéo	8	0	8
Oddar Meanchey	1	0	1
Kep	1	0	1
Pailin	1	0	1
Tboung Khmum	8	0	8
Total	120	5	125

=== Senate (2024) ===
Preliminary results released by the NEC showed that the CPP had won 55 of the 58 contested seats in the Senate, with the remaining four seats being filled by appointees of King Norodom Sihamoni and the National Assembly. The other three contested seats were won by the Khmer Will Party, a coalition of parties opposed to Hun Sen and a proxy of the Candlelight Party. It also showed that the opposition had lost ground in Phnom Penh to the CPP by nearly half of its votes and by 30 percent in the surrounding Kandal Province.

Party	Votes	%	Seats	+/–
Cambodian People's Party	10,052	85.92	55	-3
Khmer Will Party	1,394	11.92	3	New
Nation Power Party	234	2.00	0	New
FUNCINPEC	19	0.16	0	0
Members appointed by National Assembly			2	0
Members appointed by Monarch (Note: Two independents.)			2	0
Total	11,699	100.00	62	11730
Valid votes	11,699	99.74		
Invalid/blank votes	31	0.26		
Total votes	11,730	100.00		
Registered voters/turnout	11,747	99.86		
Source: KT, NEC, KT, VP, Xinhua

=== Results by region ===
Regions	CPP			KWP			FUNCINPEC			NPP			Blank/invalid	Total
Regions	Votes	%	Seats	Votes	%	Seats	Votes	%	Seats	Votes	%	Seats	Blank/invalid	Total
Region 1	817	90.18%	6	88	9.71%	0	1	0.11%	0	0	0.00%	0	7	
Region 2	1121	82.12%	7	239	17.51%	1	1	0.07%	0	4	0.29%	0	7	
Region 3	779	84.22%	5	130	14.05%	0	4	0.43%	0	12	1.30%	0	7	
Region 4	1191	77.95%	9	218	14.27%	1	1	0.07%	0	118	7.72%	0	7	
Region 5	1187	88.78%	7	148	11.07%	0	0	0.00%	0	2	0.15%	0	7	
Region 6	1161	82.28%	6	245	17.36%	1	1	0.07%	0	4	0.28%	0	7	
Region 7	1575	90.47%	9	151	8.67%	0	0	0.00%	0	15	0.86%	0	7	
Region 8	1501	84.99%	6	175	9.91%	0	11	0.62%	0	79	4.47%	0	7	
Total	10,117	86.99%	55	1,394	11.01%	3	19	0.15%	0	234	1.85%	0	7	11,730
Source: National Election Committee

The King and National Assembly each nominate two senators, bringing the total to 62 members.

== See also ==
- Politics of Cambodia
- List of legislatures by country
