= Presidents of the Senate (Cambodia) =

Highest ranking-official of the Senate of Cambodia

President of the Senate
- ប្រធានព្រឹទ្ធសភា
- Seal of the Senate

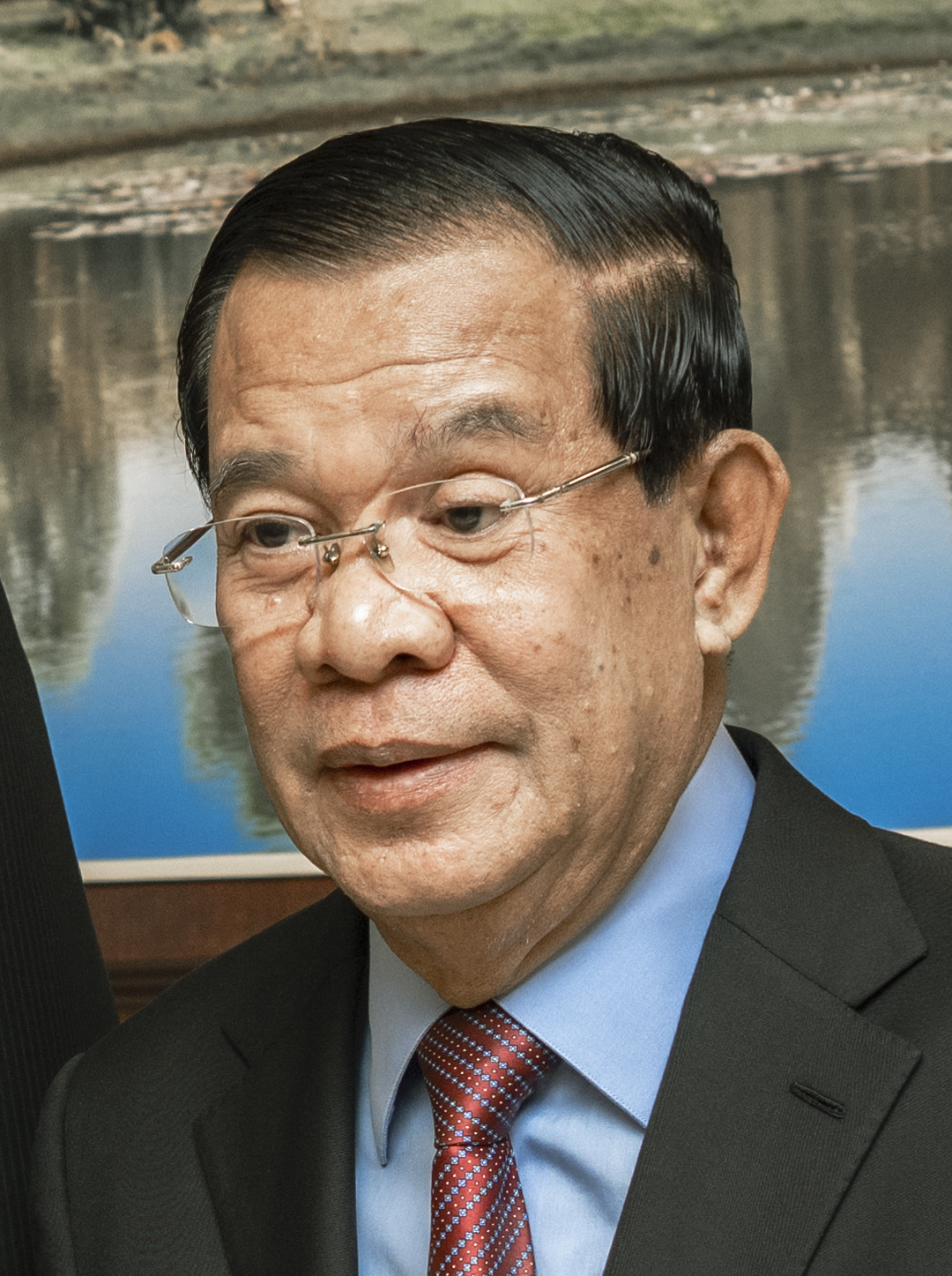
- Incumbent; Hun Sen since 3 April 2024
- Senate of Cambodia
- Style: His Excellency (formal, diplomatic); Samdech (official, formal)
- Status: Presiding officer Acting head of state, when monarch is absent or incapacitated
- Member of: Royal Council of the Throne
- Nominator: Monarch
- Appointer: Elected by the Senate
- Term length: Six years
- Inaugural holder: Saukam Khoy
- Formation: 1972; 54 years ago; 25 March 1999 (re-established)
- Abolished: 17 April 1975; 51 years ago
- Website: senate.gov.kh

The president of the Senate (Khmer: ប្រធានព្រឹទ្ធសភា, Prâthéan Prœ̆tthsâphéa [prɑtʰiən prɨt.sapʰiə]) is the presiding officer of the Senate, the upper chamber of the legislature of Cambodia. The Senate was created in 1972 during the Khmer Republic replacing the previous upper house, the Council of Kingdom.

== Presidents of the Senate ==
Portrait	Name (Born–Died)	In office			Party	Term
Portrait	Name (Born–Died)	From	To	Duration	Party	Term
	Saukam Khoy សូកាំ ខូយ (1914–2008)	1972	1975	3 years	PRS	(1972)
Senate abolished from 1975 to 1999
	Chea Sim ជា ស៊ីម (1932–2015)	25 March 1999 (Note: One source mentioned that Chea Sim headed the Senate since 1997.)	8 June 2015	16 years, 75 days	CPP	1 (1999)
	Chea Sim ជា ស៊ីម (1932–2015)	25 March 1999	8 June 2015	16 years, 75 days	CPP	2 (2006)
	Chea Sim ជា ស៊ីម (1932–2015)	25 March 1999	8 June 2015	16 years, 75 days	CPP	3 (2012)
	Say Chhum សាយ ឈុំ (1945–); Acting President of Senate	c. April 2015	9 June 2015	69 days	CPP	3 (2012)
		Say Chhum សាយ ឈុំ (1945–)	9 June 2015	3 April 2024	8 years, 299 days	CPP
4 (2018)		Say Chhum សាយ ឈុំ (1945–)	9 June 2015	3 April 2024	8 years, 299 days	CPP
	Hun Sen ហ៊ុន សែន (1952–)	3 April 2024	Incumbent	2 years, 157 days	CPP	5 (2024)

== Presidents of the Council of Kingdom ==
Presidents of the Council of Kingdom (French: Président du Conseil du Royaume) from 1947 to 1972. There were 24 members in the council. The Constitution of 1947 established the Council of Kingdom to provide "advice" on the adoption of laws. Members were appointed by the king and the National Assembly.

Name	Took office	Left office	Notes
Khuon Nay	1948	1950	
Oum Chheang Sun	January 1950	February 1952	
Penn Nouth	?–1953	1953–?	
Norodom Sihanouk	October 1955	January 1956	
Sim Var	1956	1958	
Sam Nhean	1958	1959	
Meas Scan	1959	January 1960	
Ek Yi Oun	January 1960	1960	
Sisowath Watchayavong	February 1960	1960	
Sisowath Monireth	1960	?	
Norodom Kantol	1961	1962	
Norodom Montana	1963	1968	
Keuk Kyheang	1968	1969	
Ong Sim	1969	1971–?	
