= Chou Bun Eng =

Cambodian politician

Her Excellency Chou Bun Eng
- ជូ ប៊ុនអេង
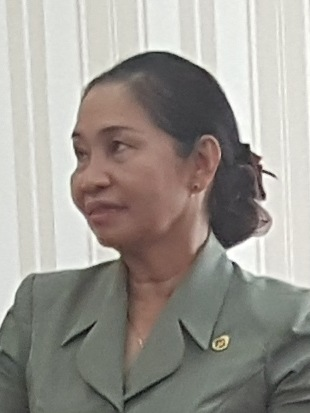

Secretary of State for the Interior
- Incumbent
- Assumed office 2008
- Prime Minister: Hun Sen

Permanent Vice-Chairwoman of the National Committee for Counter Trafficking
- Incumbent
- Assumed office 2009

Vice-Chairwoman of the Cambodian National Council for Women
- Incumbent
- Assumed office 2009

Personal details
- Born: 10 April 1956 (age 70)
- Party: Cambodian People's Party

Chou Bun Eng (Khmer: ជូ ប៊ុនអេង, born 10 April 1956) is a Cambodian politician. A longtime member of the ruling Cambodian People's Party, she is currently secretary of state of the Ministry of Interior.

== Secretary of state (2008–present) ==
=== National Committee for Counter Trafficking ===
In 2009, Chou Bun Eng has been assigned as the forefront government official to combat human trafficking by serving as the permanent vice chair of the National Committee for Counter Trafficking. In late 2016 she actively coordinated government inter-ministerial efforts to address the issue of illegal surrogate babies.

== Personal and family life ==
=== Marriages and children ===
- Ran Serey Leakhena (born Oct 1, 1979), government official
