= 1981 Cambodian general election =

- 1 May 1981

All 117 seats in the National Assembly 59 seats needed for a majority
- Registered: 3,280,565
- Turnout: 97.83% ▲
	First party
Leader	Pen Sovan
Party	KPRP
Seats won	117
Seat change	New
Prime Minister before election
Vacant
Elected Prime Minister
Pen Sovan
KPRP

General elections were held in Cambodia on 1 May 1981 and marked the establishment of the new, Vietnamese-backed, state of the People's Republic of Kampuchea (PRK). The Kampuchean People's Revolutionary Party was the only party to contest the election, and won all 117 seats. Voter turnout was reported to be 97.8%.

Pen Sovan, the General Secretary, became Prime Minister on 27 June 1981 but was removed from office on 5 December and replaced by Chan Sy.

== Background ==
In December 1978, the Vietnamese, along with the help of the Pol Pot opposition movement, the Kampuchean National United Front for National Salvation, invaded Kampuchea.

The Vietnamese, also known as the "elder brothers", took over Phnom Penh on 7 January 1979. 10 January 1979 marked the establishment of the People's Republic of Kampuchea (PRK) government. By the beginning of 1980, the Vietnamese had forced the defeated Democratic Kampuchean Army into their mountain fortifications.

In 1980, the Vietnamese seemed like the lesser evil as Cambodia faced a period of uncertainty. The greater fear lied in the potential revival of a coalition between the Democratic Kampuchea with the Chinese, Thai and Western backing. Furthermore, Cambodians initially perceived the Vietnamese as their liberators, many Khmer now saw them as opportunists who wished to subjugate the country. This was the general drive for many Vietnamese-opposing groups such as the KPNLF. Prior to the political return of Prince Sihanouk, Cambodia's King who ruled from 1941 to 1955 and had recently been living in exile in Beijing, in January 1981, the leader of the KPNLF Son Sann, met with the Prime Minister of Democratic Kampuchea, Khieu Samphan. Prince Sihanouk returned to the political life on 8 February 1981, with the intention of heading “a government and a United Front against Vietnamese colonialism in Kampuchea.” In March 1981, Sihanouk's resistance movement called FUNCINPEC joined with the small resistance army known as the Armée Nationale Sihanoukiste (ANS), the Khmer Rouge, and Son Sann's KPNLF to discuss anti-Vietnamese and PAVN prospects. This only unsettled and prompted the Vietnamese to act quickly.

The Vietnamese’ effort to start a Khmer state and nation began in Spring 1981. On 10 March 1981, Radio Phnom Penh announced a draft constitution, which caused villagers to elect their local committees in a narrow time frame due to the pressure of growing anti-Vietnamese organizations.

== Electoral system ==
The 1981 elections are known for its close resemblance to the Vietnamese model. They were set up as a plurality system and applied in 20 MMCs. The law stated that for every MMC, there had to be more candidates than seats distributed. The electoral laws were exactly the same except for Article 4 in the new Cambodian constitution. This one explained that “Citizens of the PRK have the obligation to take part in the general elections to elect members of the National Assembly who, loyal to the fatherland, agree to follow the political line of the KNUFNS and work tirelessly in the service of the people.” A law nowhere to be found in the initial constitution.

The district magnitude ranged from 2 to 13 seats with an average size of 5.9. There were open lists and multiple votes, with the voting process consisting of voters choosing their candidates by crossing off the names of those they did not wish to vote for.

Candidates would then be nominated jointly by the Front Central Committee, the Central mass organizations, and the Front Committees and mass organizations at the lower levels. The deputies were directly elected for five-year terms, and the Assembly would meet around twice a year.

== Campaign ==
148 candidates, who were all approved by the electoral committee of the National United Front for the Salvation of Kampuchea, contested 117 seats in the National Assembly. No constituency had less than 2 seats to fill in the National Assembly.

== Conduct ==
The elections occurred in a hasty manner due to the growth of anti-Vietnamese forces through Khmer resistance meetings and the Vietnamese’ fear of potential coalescence between them.

Other issues with this election were found in the Constitution. An original draft had been initially printed and distributed 10,000 times in 1980, yet the 1981 Constitution more heavily emphasized Indo-Chinese solidarity and bore the stamp of the 1980 Vietnamese Constitution.

There were several other minor problems with the system, such as the regime's violation of its own decree of 18 March 1981. Rather than announcing candidates 15 days prior to the election, as was appropriate, the PRK only announced them 10 days in advance.

Another issue was spotted in the official results of 27 June 1981, when it was revealed that Sim Ka, who at the time was the Chairman of the Committee to Control State Affairs, had no seat in the Assembly and therefore no constituency.

== Results ==
The official results were broadcast on 1 May 1981 by Radio Phnom Penh, remaining in conformity with the Communist practice. They announced the proclamation of the People's Republic of Kampuchea which lead to Kampuchean People's Revolutionary Party (KPRP) control of power. Considering its sole opponent was the isolated group of Khmer Rouge, the PRK claimed the majority of support.

The results only asserted President Heng Samrin and Vice President Pen Sovan’s leaderships as they secured 99.75% and 99.63% of the Phnom Penh constituency votes.

Party	Votes	%	Seats	+/–
Kampuchean People's Revolutionary Party			117	New
Others			0	–
Total			117	–133
Registered voters/turnout	3,280,565	97.83		
Source: Phnomn Penh Post

== Aftermath ==
On 29 May 1981, the Kampuchean People’s Revolutionary Party held a four-day congress in Phnom Peng. Lê Duẩn, the first secretary of the Communist Party of Vietnam, along with ten other foreign representatives attended the meeting. The Fourth Party Congress announced Pen Sovan as General secretary of the elected politburo and Central Committee of the Revolutionary Party of the People of Kampuchea.

However, on 4 December 1981, the Vietnamese replaced Pen Sovan with Heng Samrin as Secretary General, because of Sovan's pro-Moscow sentiments.

A list of foreign communist parties that supported the newly established Cambodian government was released on 16 June 1981. The organizations originated from various communist countries such as Vietnam, Laos (occupied by 60,000 Vietnamese troops), the Soviet Union (Vietnam’s only ally in Asia) along with its satellites, as well as the Indonesian Communist Party PKI.

On 24 June 1981 the first National Assembly meeting was held. On 27 June 1981, Assembly Chairman Chea Sim along with the rest of the leaders of the national assembly, the Council of State, and the Council of Ministers took the oath of office and signed the constitution.

=== Constitution ===
The National Assembly’s first session consisted of implementing a new Constitution. This constitution stated that Kampuchea was an “independent and peaceful state, and where power resided in the people’s hands”.

However, the Vietnamese disagreed with many points in the original 1980 Constitutional draft. These changes were then implemented into its official form in June 1981. The Constitution noted that Cambodia would slowly orient itself towards socialism under the leadership of the KPRP. It also claimed that the state’s biggest enemies were China, the US and other imperialist countries. The one country it did express some level of interest towards was the USSR considering it was Vietnam's only ally in Asia at the time.

The new Constitution allowed for new branches to be introduced, such as the National Assembly, the Council of State, and the Council of Ministers. These would only be enacted in 1982.

== Analysis ==
This election proved the overwhelming control the Vietnamese had on Kampuchea. The Vietnamese politburo offices in Phnom Penh determined policy in the Khmer party. In the provinces, civilian advisors from Vietnamese “sister” provinces worked in offices and services. Provincial candidates had to apply to gain approval from the Vietnamese in order to run and would then have to travel to Vietnam to take part in a political training. Advisory teams from the PAVN operated districts below the province level. They were in charge of picking candidates for local elections and also had authority over the Khmer district along with internal security and troop recruitment.

The KPRP refused to work with any non-communist political forces which lead to the establishment of an exiled government in 1982. This government was none other than the offspring issued by the coalition between FUNCINPEC, ANS, the Khmer Rouge and the KPNLF in March 1981. This government was supported by the People’s Republic of China and Thailand.

Seeing it as another form of Vietnamese expansionism, China and the Association of Southeast Asian Nations (ASEAN) failed to recognize the newly backed People’s Republic of Kampuchea (PRK). ASEAN saw Vietnam as a “stalking horse for Soviet expansionism.” From 1979 to 1981, Pol Pot’s exiled government, Democratic Kampuchea, continued to be recognized at the UN, since they saw the Vietnamese’ actions in Cambodia as a violation of the UN Charter. This system allowed ASEAN to avoid using force, especially since they were unable to provide adequate military capacity to change the state of Cambodia.

== Bibliography ==
- Elections in Asia and the Pacific : A Data Handbook: Volume II: South East Asia, East Asia, and the South Pacific; Volume 2 of Elections in Asia and the Pacific: A Data Handbook, Dieter Nohlen, ISBN 9780199249589
- Kiernan, Ben, and Chanthou Boua. Peasants and politics in Kampuchea, 1942-81. London: Zed, 1982. Print.
- Timothy, Carney (January 1982). "Kampuchea in 1981: Fragile Stalemate". University of California Press. Vol. 22, No. 1: 78–87.
- KERSHAW, ROGER (1982-01-01). "Lesser Current: The Election Ritual and Party Consolidation in the People's Republic of Kampuchea". Contemporary Southeast Asia. 3 (4): 315–339.
