= People's Revolutionary Youth Union of Kampuchea =

People's Revolutionary Youth Union of Kampuchea Khmer: សហភាពយុវជនប្រជាជនបដិវត្តន៍កម្ពុជា
- Founded: 1979
- Dissolved: 1989
- Mother party: Kampuchean People's Revolutionary Party
- National affiliation: KUFNCD
- International affiliation: World Federation of Democratic Youth

The People's Revolutionary Youth Union of Kampuchea (Khmer: សហភាពយុវជនប្រជាជនបដិវត្តន៍កម្ពុជា) was the youth organization of the Khmer People's Revolutionary Party (KPRP; which governed the People's Republic of Kampuchea during the 1980s). The organization was internationally known by its French name, Union de la Jeunesse Populaire Révolutionnaire du Kampuchéa (UJPRK). UJPRK was a member of the World Federation of Democratic Youth.

UJPRK was a member of the Kampuchean United Front for National Construction and Defense, the front of Kampuchean mass organizations. The role of KUFNCD and UJPRK was established in the Constitution.

UJPRK organized youth between the ages of 15 and 26. It functioned as a "school of Marxism" for future members of the KPRP. At the time of the 2nd Congress of the UJPRK in 1987, the organization had more than 50,000 members. A significant portion of the members were within the armed forces.
