= IEU (disambiguation) =

IEU or Ieu may refer to:

- Independent Education Union of Australia, the union of employees working in non-government schools in Australia
- Internet Encyclopedia of Ukraine, a free English-language online encyclopedia with a wide range of articles about Ukraine

== Education ==
- PLA Information Engineering University, Chinese military university
- IE University, a private university in Madrid, Spain
- İzmir University of Economics, a private university in Turkey

== People ==
- Ieu Koeus, a Cambodian politician
- Ieu Pannakar, a Cambodian film director and statesman
