= Senate (Cambodia) =

Upper house of the Parliament of Cambodia

Senate ព្រឹទ្ធសភា Pruetsaphea
- 5th Senate
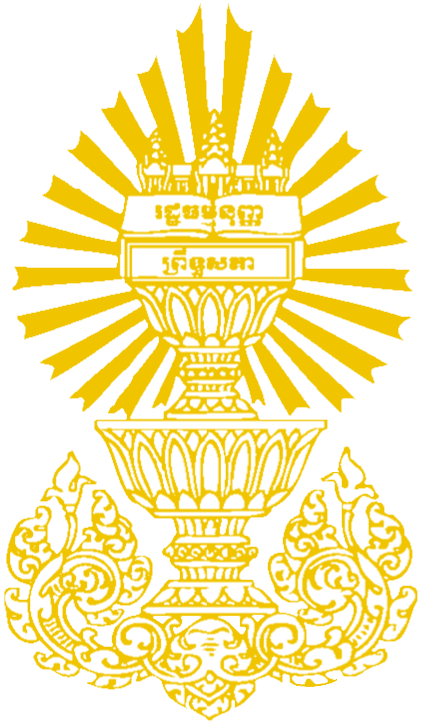

Type
- Type: Upper house of the Parliament of Cambodia None (1975–1999) Upper house (1972–1975)

History
- Founded: 1972; 54 years ago (original) 1999; 27 years ago (current form)
- Preceded by: Council of the Kingdom
- New session started: 3 April 2024; 2 years ago

Leadership
- President: Hun Sen (CPP) since 3 April 2024
- First Vice President: Ouch Borith (CPP) since 25 November 2024
- Second Vice President: Thun Vathana (CPP) since 25 November 2024

Structure
- Seats: 62
- Political groups: Elected members (58) Government: CPP (55); Opposition: KWP (3); Appointed members (4): CPP (2); Independent (2)
- Length of term: 6 years

Elections
- Voting system: Indirect party-list proportional representation
- First election: September 1972 (original) 22 January 2006 (current form)
- Last election: 25 February 2024
- Next election: On or before 24 February 2030

Meeting place
- Solidarity Palace; Chamkar Mon, Phnom Penh; Cambodia

Website
- senate.gov.kh

The Senate (Khmer: ព្រឹទ្ធសភា, Pruetsaphea [prɨtsapʰiə]; lit. 'Senatorial Assembly'), formally the Senate of the Kingdom of Cambodia (ព្រឹទ្ធសភានៃព្រះរាជាណាចក្រកម្ពុជា), is the upper house of the Parliament of Cambodia. It is a legislative body composed of 62 members. 58 of the Senate seats are elected every six years by the commune councillors from 24 provinces of Cambodia and members of the National Assembly. In addition, the King nominates two senators, and the National Assembly nominates two, ending with a total of 62 senators. The Senate performs its duties as determined in the constitution and law in force. The Senate is chaired and presided by the president, currently Hun Sen of the Cambodian People's Party and assisted by two Vice Presidents.

The first Senate session was held on March 25, 1999, and the first election was held on January 22, 2006. The fifth and current Senate was inaugurated by King Norodom Sihamoni on April 3, 2024.

== Electoral system ==
The Senate of Cambodia is elected every 6 years by an indirect party-list proportional representation through 8 multi members constituencies (regions), with the Communal Chiefs, Communal Councilors, Members of the National Assembly.

Regions	Provinces	Seats
Region 1	Phnom Penh	6
Region 2	Kampong Cham, Tboung Khmum	8
Region 3	Kandal	5
Region 4	Banteay Meachey, Battambang, Siem Reap, Pailin, Oddar Meanchey	10
Region 5	Kampot, Kep, Takeo	7
Region 6	Prey Veng, Svay Rieng	7
Region 7	Kampong Chhnang, Kampong Speu, Preah Sihanouk, Koh Kong, Pursat	9
Region 8	Kampong Thom, Preah Vihear, Kratie, Strung Treng, Ratanakiri, Mondulkiri	6

== Term and session ==
Article 102: The term of the Senate is six years and ends on the day when the new Senate takes office.

Article 107: The Senate holds its ordinary sessions twice a year. Each session shall last at least three months. If requested by the king or Prime Minister, or at least one-third of all the senators, the Senate shall convene in an extraordinary session.

An absolute majority vote of all senators is used in the following cases:

- Election of the President, Vice Presidents of the Senate and all members of the commissions or special commission
- Adoption of organic laws
- Adoption of the internal regulations of the Senate
- Adoption of laws or issues

A two-thirds majority vote of all senators is used for the following cases:

- Adoption of the Constitution law
- The vote pertaining to the decision to indict, arrest, detent, confinement disciplinary action, parliamentary immunity, incompatibility, loss of membership, or abandonment of post.

A three-fourths majority vote of all senators is to be used to decide on the suspension of detention or indictment of any senator.

== Leadership ==
The President of the Senate is assisted by two Vice Presidents who lead the Senate. If the President is unable to perform his/her duties due to illness or due to fulfilling the functions of Acting Head of State or as a Regent, or due to being on a mission abroad, a Vice President shall replace him. (Article 110-New of the Constitution)

The Permanent Committee of the Senate consists of:

- The President of the Senate
- Two Vice Presidents of the Senate
- The Chairman of the nine Commissions of the Senate

== Composition (elected seats) ==
Party
Party	2000 seats	2006 seats	2012 seats	2018 seats
Cambodian People's Party	31	45	46	58
FUNCINPEC	21	10	0	0
Sam Rainsy Party	7	2	11	0
Total	57	57	57	58

== Elections ==
=== 2018 ===
Party	Votes	%	Seats won	+/-
Cambodian People's Party	11,202	95.95%	58	▲12
FUNCINPEC	276	2.36%	0	0
Khmer National United Party	182	1.55%	0	0
Cambodian Youth Party	3	0.20%	0	0
Total	11,670	100	58	

=== 2012 ===
Party	Votes	%	Seats won	+/-
Cambodian People's Party	8,880	77.81%	46	▲9
Sam Rainsy Party	2,503	22.19%	11	▲1
Total	11,383	100	57	

== List of senators in 2018 ==
Party	Name
(Nominated by King)	Norodom Arunrasmey
(Nominated by King)	Oum Somanin
FUNCINPEC	Chea Chantevy
FUNCINPEC	Suon Mean
Cambodian People's Party	Soeuy Keo
Cambodian People's Party	Mom Chim Huy
Cambodian People's Party	Ty Borasy
Cambodian People's Party	Thong Chan
Cambodian People's Party	Ouk Bunchhoeun
Cambodian People's Party	Suon Lon
Cambodian People's Party	Yong Sem
Cambodian People's Party	Lao Meng Khin
Cambodian People's Party	Sok Yat
Cambodian People's Party	Say Chhum
Cambodian People's Party	Sok Eysan
Cambodian People's Party	Tep Ngorn
Cambodian People's Party	Chan Nareth
Cambodian People's Party	Nam Toum
Cambodian People's Party	Chhit Kimyeat
Cambodian People's Party	Kong Sarath
Cambodian People's Party	Lay Piseth
Cambodian People's Party	Chea Cheth
Cambodian People's Party	Sim Ka
Cambodian People's Party	Ney Pena
Cambodian People's Party	Kun Net
Cambodian People's Party	Ok Kong
Cambodian People's Party	Seng Siphy
Cambodian People's Party	Ok Kong
Cambodian People's Party	Pol Lim
Cambodian People's Party	Men Chhoeun
Cambodian People's Party	An Sum
Cambodian People's Party	Hem Khorn
Cambodian People's Party	Chung Kimsran
Cambodian People's Party	Khieu Muth
Cambodian People's Party	Muong Poy
Cambodian People's Party	Tim Phan
Cambodian People's Party	Choung Veng
Cambodian People's Party	Lan Chhorn
Cambodian People's Party	Chuan Leng
Cambodian People's Party	
Cambodian People's Party	Men Siphan
Cambodian People's Party	O Sokhom
Cambodian People's Party	Kok An
Cambodian People's Party	Mong Rithy
Cambodian People's Party	Prak Chamroeun
Cambodian People's Party	Nhem Samorn
Cambodian People's Party	
Cambodian People's Party	Kim Thea
Cambodian People's Party	Say Borin
Cambodian People's Party	Srey Ben
Cambodian People's Party	Sam An
Cambodian People's Party	
Cambodian People's Party	Mam Bunheang
Cambodian People's Party	Si Vanath
Cambodian People's Party	Chim Lav
Cambodian People's Party	Ly Yong Phat
Cambodian People's Party	Tep Yuthy
Cambodian People's Party	Chheuy Channa
Cambodian People's Party	Ly Sary
Cambodian People's Party	Chhay Vanna
Cambodian People's Party	Khuon Khundy
Cambodian People's Party	Heng Bora

== List of senators in 2012 ==
Name of Senator	Gender	Party/Nomination	Term
Oum Mannorine	Male	Nominated by King	
Ieu Pannakar	Male	Nominated by King	
Prak Cham Roeun	Male	Nominated by Assembly	
Norodom Bupphadevi	Female	Nominated by Assembly	
Chhat Loeum	Male	Cambodian People's Party	
Soeuy Keo	Male	Cambodian People's Party	
Chhoun Leng	Male	Cambodian People's Party	
Bou Thang	Male	Cambodian People's Party	
Chea Son	Male	Cambodian People's Party	
Ty Borasy	Female	Cambodian People's Party	
Hong Touhay	Male	Cambodian People's Party	
Thong Chon	Male	Cambodian People's Party	
Tith Ream	Male	Cambodian People's Party	
Ouk Bounchheoun	Male	Cambodian People's Party	
Soun Loan	Male	Cambodian People's Party	
Yang Sem	Male	Cambodian People's Party	
Lav Mingkan	Male	Cambodian People's Party	
Kim Naing	Male	Cambodian People's Party	
Lak Aun	Female	Cambodian People's Party	
Chan Nareth	Male	Cambodian People's Party	
Um Sarith	Male	Cambodian People's Party	
Chhit Kimyeat	Male	Cambodian People's Party	
Kong Sareach	Male	Cambodian People's Party	
Pum Sichan	Female	Cambodian People's Party	
Lay Ypisith	Male	Cambodian People's Party	
Chea Cheth	Male	Cambodian People's Party	
Sim Ka	Male	Cambodian People's Party	
Ney Pena	Male	Cambodian People's Party	
Peng Path	Male	Cambodian People's Party	
Puth Khov	Male	Cambodian People's Party	
Ok Kong	Male	Cambodian People's Party	
Ung Ty	Male	Cambodian People's Party	
Am Sam Ath	Male	Cambodian People's Party	
An Sum	Male	Cambodian People's Party	
Yim Set	Male	Cambodian People's Party	
Tim Phan	Male	Cambodian People's Party	
Nuon Samin	Male	Cambodian People's Party	
Men Siphan	Male	Cambodian People's Party	
Kok An	Male	Cambodian People's Party	
Mong Reththy	Male	Cambodian People's Party	
Vann Vuth	Male	Cambodian People's Party	
Chhouk Chhim	Female	Cambodian People's Party	
Keo Maly	Female	Cambodian People's Party	
Mean Som An	Female	Cambodian People's Party	
Mam Bunneang	Male	Cambodian People's Party	
Ly Yong Phat	Male	Cambodian People's Party	
Heng Bora	Male	Cambodian People's Party	
Kong Korm	Male	Sam Rainsy Party	
Nuth Rumduol	Male	Sam Rainsy Party	
Ho Vann	Male	Sam Rainsy Party	
Thach Setha	Male	Sam Rainsy Party	
Thak Lany	Female	Sam Rainsy Party	
Teav Vannol	Male	Sam Rainsy Party	
Hong Sok Hour	Male	Sam Rainsy Party	
Men Sothavarin	Male	Sam Rainsy Party	
Ke Sovannroth	Female	Sam Rainsy Party	
Eng Chhai Eang	Male	Sam Rainsy Party	
Uch Serey Yuth	Male	Sam Rainsy Party	

== See also ==
- National Assembly (Cambodia)
- Parliament of Cambodia
- Politics of Cambodia
- List of legislatures by country
