= Sar Kheng =

Cambodian politician (born 1951)

Samdech Kralahom Sar Kheng MP PC
- ស ខេង
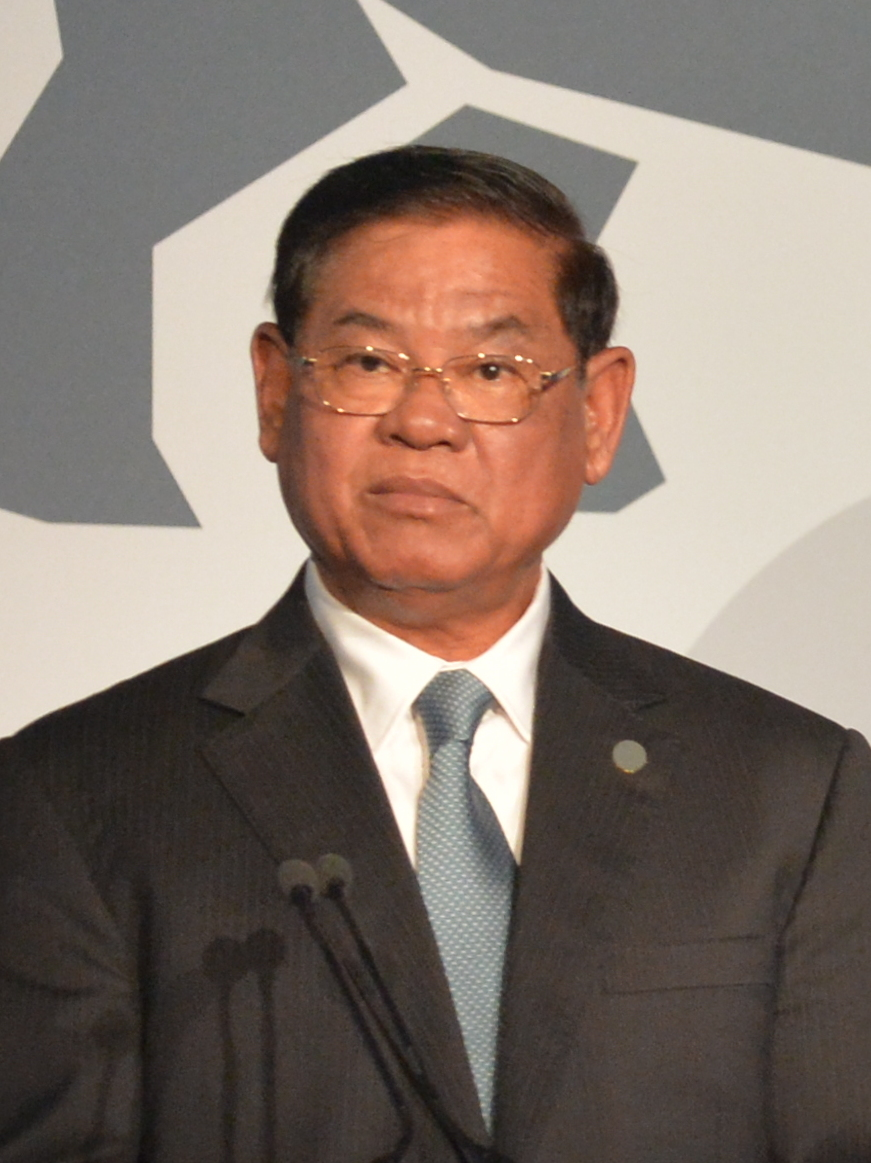
- Kheng in 2018

Minister of Interior
- In office 3 February 1992 – 22 August 2023
- Prime Minister: Hun Sen; Norodom Ranariddh; Ung Huot
- Co-Minister: You Hockry (1993–2004); Norodom Sirivudh (2004–2006)
- Succeeded by: Sar Sokha

Deputy Prime Minister of Cambodia
- In office 3 February 1992 – 22 August 2023
- Prime Minister: Hun Sen; Norodom Ranariddh; Ung Huot

Vice President of the Cambodian People's Party
- Incumbent
- Assumed office 20 June 2015
- President: Hun Sen
- Serving with: Say Chhum; Tea Banh; Men Sam An; Hun Manet
- Preceded by: Hun Sen

Majority Leader of the National Assembly
- In office 22 January 2015 – 31 January 2017
- Prime Minister: Hun Sen
- Preceded by: Position established
- Succeeded by: Position abolished

Member of Parliament for Battambang
- Incumbent
- Assumed office 14 June 1993

Chairman of National Committee for Counter Trafficking in Person, Cambodia
- In office 2009 – 22 August 2023

Personal details
- Born: 15 January 1951 (age 75) Prey Veng, Cambodia, French Indochina
- Party: Cambodian People's Party
- Spouse: Nhem Sakhan
- Children: 3, including Sar Sokha

Sar Kheng (Khmer: ស ខេង; born 15 January 1951) is a Cambodian politician. He is the vice president of the ruling Cambodian People's Party and served as Minister of the Interior and deputy prime minister from 1992 to 2023. He also represents the province of Battambang in the Cambodian Parliament. Kheng has been the Minister of the Interior since 1992. Until March 2006, he shared the position with FUNCINPEC party member You Hockry as co-Ministers of the Interior, but then became sole interior minister in a cabinet reshuffle as FUNCINPEC ended its coalition with the CPP. He left office as interior minister in 2023 and was succeeded by his son, Sar Sokha.

== Biography ==
=== A Cambodian child in the Sangkum ===
Sar Kheng was born on January 15, 1951, during the Sangkum in Ang Daung Saat Village, Krabau Township, Kamchay Mear District, Prey Veng Province. He was born into a peasant family.

=== From guerilla warfare to leader of the Kampuchea ===
Along with Heng Samrin, Chea Sim, and Hun Sen, Sar Kheng was among the Democratic Kampuchea cadres of the Eastern Zone. However, after commander of the Eastern Zone Sar Phim was assassinated, Sar Kheng, Hun Sen, and other leaders who refused the purges of the Cambodian genocide went into the opposition against the Khmers Rouges. The ties and friendships made at that time have lasted and still continue to determine Cambodian politics. Since they fled to Vietnam, they have been accused of being pro-Vietnamese. After the Vietnamese troops entered Cambodia and pushed back the Khmers Rouge to the North West provinces, Kheng, along with his brother-in-law Chea Sim, took on leadership positions in national security and were identified as "hard-liners" in the People's Republic of Kampuchea government, fighting to eradicate the Khmer Rouge from Cambodia. As leaders in the one-party state controlled by the Kampuchean People's Revolutionary Party (the former name of the CPP), they were accused of operating "a police state". Human Rights Watch Asia Director Brad Adams described governmental policies that included imprisonment without trial and torture of political activists.

=== Coup after coup towards democracy after the return of the monarchy ===
Kheng became the Minister of Interior in 1992 during the UN protectorate period overseeing the State of Cambodia's transition to the Kingdom of Cambodia. During this time, the CPP formed a coalition with its main rival, Prince Norodom Ranariddh's FUNCINPEC party. As a result of this arrangement, each party appointed members to "share" higher offices. Within the CPP, Kheng is its Vice President and a standing member of its Central Committee, the body responsible for all core decision making.

==== 1994 coup: surviving the failed attempt of Chakrapong and Sin Song ====
A schism slowly developed in the CPP with Hun Sen and his supporters who would hold on to power at all costs on one side and the more moderate Kheng, Chea Sim and Heng Samrin on the other. Hun Sen, who had control and support of the military and National Police emerged as the undisputed leader. His suspicion of Kheng was such that during an aborted coup attempt led by Prince Norodom Chakrapong in 1994, Hun Sen totally bypassed the Ministry of the Interior in his response, not notifying Kheng of troop mobilization or movements until the whole episode had already ended. Sar Kheng was particularly opposed to the tactics behind the coup as they only reinforced the political position of the Khmer Rouge by perpetuating political instability in Cambodia.

==== 1997 coup: refusing a violent response ====
Three years later, while planning the 1997 coup to oust his popular co-Prime Minister Prince Norodom Ranariddh, Hun Sen personally confronted Kheng to ensure his loyalty and support for the use of force. Sar Kheng warned Hun Sen against the use of violence and said that he would refuse to take part in a coup. Further, Kheng could do nothing to reign in Hok Lundy, the head of the National Police force and close confidant of Hun Sen, who was accused of crimes and abuses of power ranging from human trafficking and drug smuggling to the murder of political opponents even though Lundy was under the authority of the Interior Ministry.

By the late 1990s, Kheng's name was often floated by Western observers as a possible party "reformer".

=== Growing stronger after the loss of the FUNCINPEC ===
Since 1992, Kheng and FUNCINPEC member You Hockry were ruling as co-Ministers of the Interior. This arrangement lasted until the Senate elections of 2006, when FUNCINPEC, which lost many seats while Ranariddh left to form his own party, dissolved the coalition and allied with Sam Rainsy's opposition movement. You Hockry, who chose to follow Ranariddh, was dismissed and Prince Norodom Sirivudh was made co-minister with Kheng. However, Sirivudh was soon also dismissed, leaving Kheng as the sole Minister of the Interior. Since this loss, Sar Kheng has been able to grow stronger and rein in any serious political opposition.

In September 2015, he warned the authorities of Sihanoukville whom he suspected of taking bribes in return for allowing illegal fishing and smuggling activities off the coast.

After Sar Kheng downturned offers of inclusion by the Cambodia National Reform Party in 2017, Sam Rainsy directed "revenge claims" against Sar Kheng. In 2019, Sar Kheng sued Sam Rainsy for his allegations that he had been colluding with Dy Vichea against Hun Sen, accusations which he considered "fake news and incitements".

== Politics ==
=== Orkun santheipheap: balancing public order and personal freedom ===
Since coming to power in 1992, Minister of Interior Sar Kheng has overseen the transition to democracy. While some have applauded the longest period of political stability since the Cambodian Civil War and Kheng's efforts to fight against corruption and drug trafficking, others have been critical of the suppression of political opponents such as CNRP deputy leader, Kem Sokha. Kheng continues to attempt to be a mediating force in Cambodia politics. In September 2015, Kheng announced the formation of a seven-person police commission to investigate the 2013 death threats made by CPP Interior Ministry official Lieutenant Colonel Pheng Vannak against CNRP deputy leader Kem Sokha. The investigation has resulted in Kheng removing Vannak from his position. After the October 2015 attacks on opposition CNRP lawmakers by pro-CPP demonstrators, Kheng conducted informal meetings with CNRP leader Sam Rainsy in an attempt to "restore a working relationship" between the two parties and quell the tension. This politics of stability has been summarized in the slogan which begins with a leitmotiv of CPP: orkun santheipheap (Khmer: អរគុណសន្តិភាព), which translates as "thanks be for peace".

== Honors and recognitions ==
On June 14, 2015, King Norodom Sihamoni awarded Kheng the honorary title of Samdech. His official title is "Samdech Kralahom Sar Kheng" (សម្ដេចក្រឡាហោម ស ខេង).

== Family ==
Kheng is married to Nhem Sakhan with whom he has three children. Through matrimonial alliances, Kheng is part of an intricate network of powerful Cambodian families. Kheng is also brother-in-law to former president of the Cambodian National Assembly Chea Sim, who was CPP president until his death in 2015. His son Sar Sokha is married to Ke Kuon Sophy, the daughter of General Ke Kim Yan.
