= Ran Serey Leakhena =

Cambodian politician (born 1979)

- Khmer: រ៉ន សិរីលក្ខិណា

Deputy Secretary General or National Committee for Counter Trafficking
- Monarch: Norodom Sihamoni

Personal details
- Born: 1 October 1979 (age 46)
- Party: Cambodian People's Party

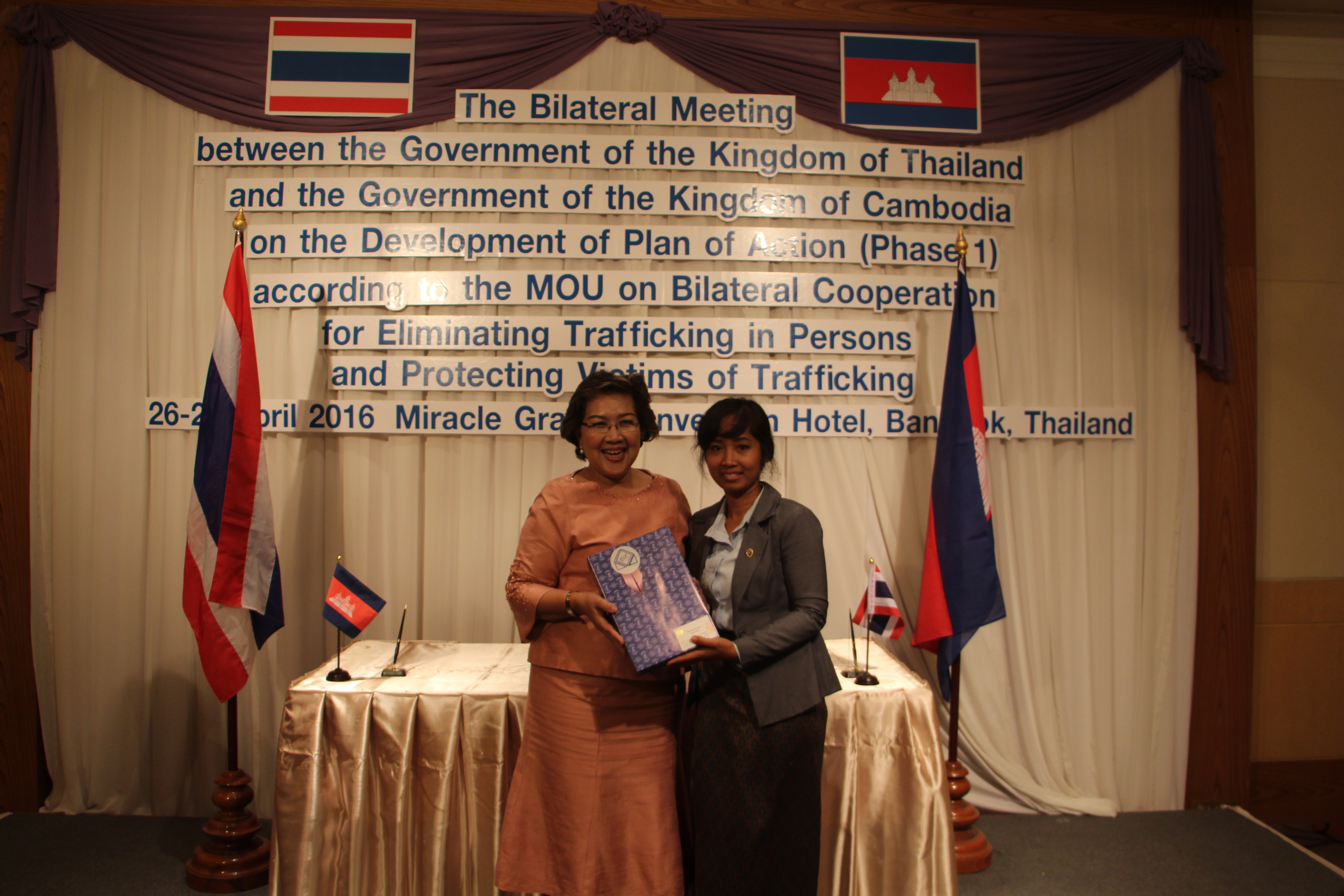
The Bilaterial meeting between the Government of the Kingdom of Thailand and the Government of the Kingdom of Cambodia on the Development of Plan of Action according to the MOU on Cooperation for Eliminating Trafficking in Persons and Protecting Victims of Trafficking.

Ran Serey Leakhena (Khmer: រ៉ន សិរីលក្ខិណា, born 1 October 1979) is an appointed government official for coordinating the international cooperation to fight against human trafficking in Cambodia.
