= National Committee for Counter Trafficking =

- Native name: គណៈកម្មាធិការជាតិប្រឆាំងការជួញដូរមនុស្ស
- Headquarters: Phnom Penh, Cambodia
- Key people: Sar Kheng, Chairman; Chou Bun Eng, Permanent Vice Chair
- Website: www.ncct.gov.kh

The National Committee for Counter Trafficking (NCCT) is a national mechanism in Cambodia for coordinating and gathering information about the efforts of ministries, institutions, national and international NGOs, the private sector, and other stakeholders to collaborate for combating human trafficking in a transparent, accountable and effective manner, responding to the commitment of the government to suppress trafficking in persons (TIP). The mechanism provides opportunities for government, civil society organizations, development partners, and other public sectors to fight against human trafficking and labor exploitation in Cambodia in close cooperation.

== Current leadership ==
- Chairman: Sar Kheng
- Permanent vice chair: Chou Bun Eng

== National working group ==
- Prevention working group
- Protection, Recovery, Reintegration and Repatriation working group
- Law Enforcement working group
- Justice working group
- Migration working group
- International Cooperation working group

== General Secretariat ==
=== Leadership ===
- Secretary general: Police Lt Gen. Ponn Samkhan
- Deputy secretaries general:
  - Police Mj Gen. Ran Serey Leakhena, International Cooperation working group and Information Technology
  - Police Lt Gen. Khiev Chanra, Migration working group
  - Police Lt Gen. Ly Tonghuy, Protection, Recovery, Reintegration and Repatriation working group
  - Police Lt Gen. Ou Manira, Protection, Recovery, Reintegration and Repatriation working group
  - Police Lt Gen. Yem Virak, Justice working group
  - Police Lt Gen. Sun Ro, Law Enforcement working group
  - Police Lt Gen. Keo Sovannara, Prevention working group
  - Police Bg Gen. Te Sotharet
- Directors:
  - Police Bg Gen. In Mean, International Cooperation working group and Information Technology
  - Police Mj Gen. Hang Chivorn, Secretariat
  - Police Mj Gen. Ran Sopheak Vathana, Prevention working group
  - Police Mj Gen. Sek Siveth, Protection, Recovery, Reintegration and Repatriation working group
  - Police Mj Gen. Keo Phalla
  - Police Mj Gen. Srey Samdy, Migration working group
