= 2006 Cambodian Senate election =

- 22 January 2006
- 57 of the 61 seats in the Senate (Note: 4 seats are appointed, 2 by the National Assembly, 2 by the Monarch); 29 seats needed for a majority
- Turnout: 97.24%
Party	Leader	Vote %	Seats	+/–
CPP	Chea Sim	69.19	45	+14
FUNCINPEC	Norodom Ranariddh	20.44	10	−11
SRP	Sam Rainsy (Note: Sam Rainsy Party named Kong Korm as its leading candidate, however Sam Rainsy was the central leading figure throughout the election.)	10.26	2	−5
Independent	-	(Note: Independent candidates are not elected but appointed by either the monarch or National Assembly)	4	+2
This lists parties that won seats. See the complete results below.
Results by Region
President of the Senate before	President of the Senate after
Chea Sim; CPP	Chea Sim; CPP

Senate elections were held in Cambodia on 22 January 2006 to elect 57 of the 61 Senators of Cambodia. The result was a victory for the Cambodian People's Party which won 45 seats. The FUNCINPEC Party won 10 seats, and the Sam Rainsy Party won 2 seats. This is the first Senate election in Cambodia since previous Senators were appointed by Parliament and the King.

== Electoral system ==
The Senate of Cambodia is elected every 6 years by an indirect party-list proportional representation through 8 multi-member constituencies (regions). Seats are allocated by the D'hondt method. As this is an indirect election, citizens do not have the right to vote, where the right to vote is given to Communal Chiefs, Communal Councilors, and members of the National Assembly.

Regions	Provinces	Seats
Region 1	Phnom Penh	6
Region 2	Kampong Cham, Tboung Khmum	8
Region 3	Kandal	5
Region 4	Banteay Meachey, Battambang, Siem Reap, Pailin, Oddar Meanchey	10
Region 5	Kampot, Kep, Takeo	7
Region 6	Prey Veng, Svay Rieng	7
Region 7	Kampong Chhnang, Kampong Speu, Preah Sihanouk, Koh Kong, Pursat	8
Region 8	Kampong Thom, Preah Vihear, Kratie, Strung Treng, Ratanakiri, Mondulkiri	6

== Results ==
Party	Votes	%	Seats
Cambodian People's Party	7,854	69.19	45
FUNCINPEC	2,320	20.44	10
Sam Rainsy Party	1,165	10.26	2
Khmer Democratic Party	13	0.11	0
Appointed members			4
Total	11,352	100.00	61
Valid votes	11,352	99.82	
Invalid/blank votes	20	0.18	
Total votes	11,372	100.00	
Registered voters/turnout	11,384	99.89	
Source: IPU, VOA
