= Mong Reththy =

Sino-Khmer businessman

- ម៉ុង ឬទ្ធី
- Born: Kasiek Heang; July 10, 1959 (age 67); Prey Phdau Commune, Kaoh Andaet District, Takeo Province, Cambodia
- Occupations: Businessman, Senator
- Known for: Founder and Chairman of Mong Reththy Group
- Spouse: Men Sun
- Children: 5

Lok Oknha Mong Reththy (Khmer: លោកឧកញ៉ា ម៉ុង ឫទ្ធី) is a Sino-Khmer businessman oknha, a member of the Cambodian Senate, a close counselor to Prime Minister Hun Sen and even dubbed "Hun's Sen's money man". He is one of the main actors of agriculture in Cambodia, through his firm Mong Reththy Group Limited, the largest agro-industrial company in Cambodia.

== Biography ==
=== A pagoda child and childhood friend of Hun Sen ===
As a child, Riththy received his education from the local Buddhist pagoda, Wat Neakavoan, in Phnom Penh for four years. It was there during his childhood that he befriended his classmate Hun Sen.

Reththy was the fifth child of 12 siblings, five of whom died under Pol Pot.

During the Khmer Rouge, he was forcibly married to his current wife. From 1979 to 1989, Riththy worked as a civil servant for the Ministry of Public Affairs, department of traffic signs.

He is often accused by foreign media sources to have made his wealth from trafficking during those years, while evidence remains to be provided to support such allegations.

=== Back to Cambodia and back to business since 1979 ===
Mong Reththy, who was originally known as Kasiek Heang, changed his name when he first arrived in Phnom Penh in 1979, thinking that his childhood name made life difficult for him because of Chinese counsenance.

Reththy established Mong Reththy Group on January 1, 1989, and officially registered on February 3, 1993. The company was later re-registered on November 29, 2000, with an initial capital of only $1,000. His company originally exported rubber before expanding to export palm oil and raise livestock. He is also involved in construction.

In 1996, Reththy was elevated to the rank of oknha by King Sihanouk.

=== Full support for the 1997 coup ===
During the July 1997 coup led by Hun Sen, Mong Reththy was among a handful of faithful who wholeheartedly offered their support to the Prime Minister. Along with Teng Bunma and Sok Kong, Reththy was among the Cambodian tycoon who helped Hun Sen stay afloat financially and maintain his political stability, while most international lenders had cut their ties with Cambodia. In April 1997, Reththy had been accused by Ho Sok, an official of the FUNCINPEC, of using his concession of the port in Sihanoukville as a platform for trafficking; the latter died during the confrontation of the 1997 coup. In reward for his faithful friendship to Hun Sen,

=== Diversifying Cambodian agriculture ===
While the agriculture of Cambodia was mainly an subsistence agriculture which relied heavily on rice for personal consumption, Mong Reththy has led a movement to diversify the agricultural production of Cambodia and increase its yield. Since 2001, Mong Reththy has invested massively in cassava plantation, planting over 1800 hectares. He has also developed palm oil through a joint venture worth US$12 million with a plantation of about 3 800 hectares on the road from Phnom Penh to Sihanoukville. In February 2001, more than 6,500 oil palm trees were deliberately burned to ashes in an act of malevolence for reasons that remain to be determined, despite accusations of deforestation.

Mong Reththy also tried to diversify Cambodian energy sources by using his pig farms and rice husk gasification or biogas to produce energy from animal and vegetal waste.

In July 2004, Mong Reththy started building his own port to compete next to the one in Sihanoukville, which costs were judged excessive.

Reththy was elected to the Senate of Cambodia in 2006 as a member of the Cambodian People's Party. Mong Reththy is in charge of the commission for agriculture at the Cambodian senate and is also chief of the Cambodian agro-industry association.

Since 2009, Reththy imported domestic Yorkshire pigs from Britain to start breeding them in Cambodia.

In January 2022, Reththy announced a new partnership with Sok Kheng to link the Bokor National Park to National Road 4, through his own palm-tree concessions.

== Contribution ==
=== Building schools for Cambodia ===
Rithy Meng has invested millions of dollars towards the construction of ovre 3,000 schools in Cambodia which are promptly identified as "Hun Sen Schools", allowing access to education to a large part of the youth of Cambodia. His construction company, Samnang Khmeng Wat, refers to the time when he was himself a "kmeng voat", a poor child who learns at the pagoda because of lack of resources.

=== Seeking resolution in land conflict ===
While Reththy Mong has been accused by certain human rights group of land-grabbing, others have appreciated his efforts "to develop more socially benign [..], more profitable and sustainable—plantation concessions in a context that is still marred by extensive land conflict."

=== Cambodian Red Cross ===
Mong Reththy sits on the board of the Cambodian Red Cross, under the chairmanship of Bun Rany, the wife Hun Sen.

== Awards and recognitions ==
=== Lok Oknha Mong Reththy: a celebrity tycoon ===
Reththy was elevated to the rank of oknha by King Sihanouk in 2006. Since then, Reththy Mong has become "one of Cambodia’s foremost celebrity tycoons", with 783,000 followers on Facebook as of October 2024.

=== Honorary degrees ===
He holds honorary doctorates in business administration and agricultural development science from the unaccredited Isles International University.

== Personal life ==
=== Family ===
Reththy married Men Sun, two years younger than him, during one of the forced marriage ceremonies along with 12 other couples orchestrated by the Pol Pot regime. They have three sons, two daughters, and eighteen grandchildren. One of his grandsons, Sowaththara Mong, currently studying at Swinburne University of Technology.

=== Pets ===
As his personal pet, Reththy Meng owns a cub Bengal tiger.

Additionally, Mong Reththy built a zoo with several more tigers, lions, and other assorted animals at Mong Reththy SenChey Agri-Tourism Zone.
