= Ly Yong Phat =

Cambodian senator and businessman

Lok Neak Oknha Ly Yong Phat
- លី យ៉ុងផាត់

Senator of Cambodia
- Incumbent
- Assumed office 2006
- Prime Minister: Hun Sen

Personal details
- Born: 1958 (age 67–68) Koh Kong province, Cambodia
- Citizenship: Cambodia; Thailand
- Party: Cambodian People's Party
- Spouse: Kim Heang
- Children: Ly Yaowalak; Ly Arporn; Phat Bunhour
- Occupation: Politician; businessman

Ly Yong Phat (born 1958, Khmer: លី យ៉ុងផាត់, Chinese: 李永法; pinyin: Lǐ Yǒngfǎ), also known as his Thai name Phat Suphapha (Thai: พัด สุภาภา), is a Sino-Cambodian senator and businessman. He owns LYP Group, a major conglomerate in Cambodia, with interests in tobacco, electricity, casinos and tourism. He has a major business presence in Koh Kong province, where he was born. Yong Phat's businesses have been linked to numerous controversies, including the use of child labour, cyber scam fraud factories, and forced land evictions. On 6 December 2022, he was appointed as prime minister Hun Sen's personal advisor. On 25 August 2023, he was appointed as prime minister Hun Manet's personal advisor.

Ly Yong Phat was granted the title of "Oknha" and later promoted to "Neak Oknha". On 12 June 2023 the Cambodian Oknha Association (COA) was launched, he was selected as the first president for a five-year term. On 27 April 2024, He was promoted to "Lok Neak Oknha" together with Pung Kheav Se, Pheap Hiek (ភាព ហៀក, 陈玉叶) and other three Chinese Cambodians.

On 12 September 2024, the U.S. State Department announced sanctions against Ly and his businesses in connection with "serious human rights abuses related to the treatment of workers subjected to forced labour in online investment scam operations" under the Global Magnitsky Act.

== Personal life ==
Ly Yong Phat is a Chinese Cambodian of Hainanese descent. He holds dual Thai-Cambodian citizenship.

He is married to Kim Heang, and has several children, including Ly Yaowalak, Phat Bunhour and Ly Arporn. Yaowalak is married to Phu Sae Ping, the child of Kok An. Arporn is married to a business tycoon Seng Nhak.
