= Kong Korm =

Cambodian politician (born 1941)

- គង់ គាំ
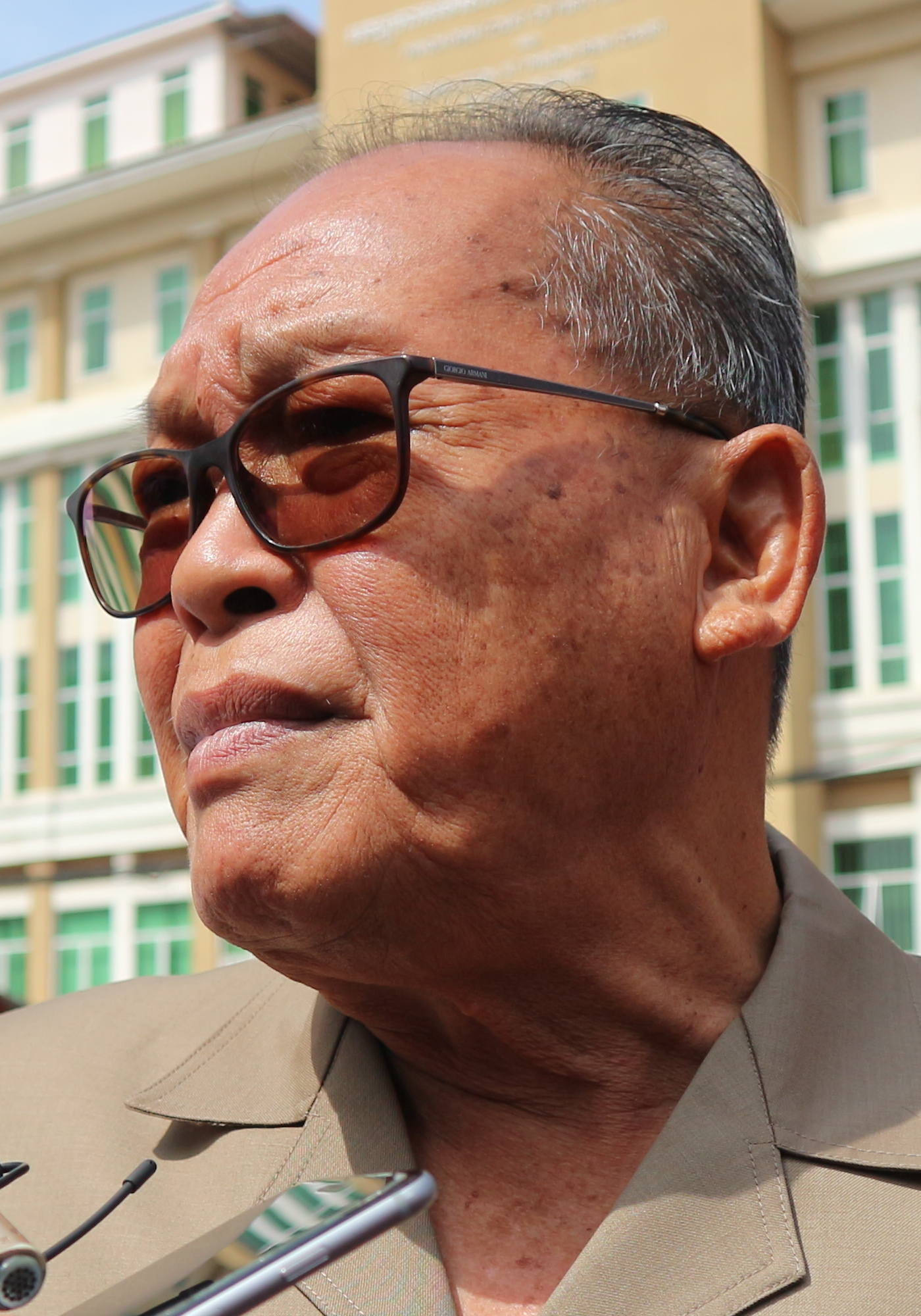
- Korm in 2019

Member of the Senate
- In office 25 March 1999 – 2 November 2015

Minister for Foreign Affairs
- In office December 1986 – December 1987
- Prime Minister: Hun Sen
- Preceded by: Hun Sen
- Succeeded by: Hun Sen

President of the Sam Rainsy Party
- In office 2 November 2012 – 2 November 2015
- Preceded by: Sam Rainsy
- Succeeded by: Teav Vannol

Personal details
- Born: 6 April 1941 (age 85) Ponhea Kraek, Kampong Cham, Cambodia, French Indochina
- Party: Khmer Will Party (2019–present)
- Other political affiliations: Sam Rainsy Party (1995–2015); Cambodian People's Party (1979–95)
- Children: Kong Monika

Kong Korm (Khmer: គង់ គាំ; born 6 April 1941) is a Cambodian politician and Senator. He was formerly a member of the Sam Rainsy Party and formerly served as its leader after Sam Rainsy resigned to lead the Cambodia National Rescue Party. He was formerly a member of the Cambodian People's Party and served as foreign minister from 1986 to 1987.

In 2019, Kong Korm was named as the honorary president of the Khmer Will Party.
