= Men Sam An =

Cambodian politician

Her Excellency Men Sam An MP
- ម៉ែន សំអន

Vice President of the Cambodian People's Party
- Incumbent
- Assumed office 24 December 2021 Serving with Say Chhum, Sar Kheng, Tea Banh, and Hun Manet
- President: Hun Sen
- Preceded by: Hun Sen

Deputy Prime Minister of Cambodia
- In office 25 September 2008 – 22 August 2023
- Prime Minister: Hun Sen

Minister of National Assembly–Senate Relations and Inspection
- In office 16 July 2004 – 22 August 2023
- Prime Minister: Hun Sen
- Succeeded by: Huot Hak

Member of Parliament for Svay Rieng
- Incumbent
- Assumed office 14 June 1993

Personal details
- Born: 15 August 1953 (age 72) Sambour, Kratié, Cambodia, French Indochina
- Party: Cambodian People's Party

Military service
- Allegiance: Cambodia
- Branch/service: Royal Cambodian Army
- Years of service: 1970–present
- Rank: Army general
- Battles/wars: Cambodian Civil War

Men Sam An (Khmer: ម៉ែន សំអន, UNGEGN: Mên Sâm'ân [maen sɑmʔɑːn]; born 15 August 1953) is a Cambodian politician. She belongs to the Cambodian People's Party and was elected to represent Svay Rieng Province in the National Assembly in 2003.

As of 2009, she serves as permanent Deputy Prime Minister of Cambodia. She is the first female deputy prime minister and four-star general. She joined the army in 1970 during the US-backed Khmer Republic era, beginning her career as a military nurse.
