= Say Chhum =

Cambodian politician

His Excellency Samdech Vibol Sena Pheakdey Say Chhum
- សាយ ឈុំ
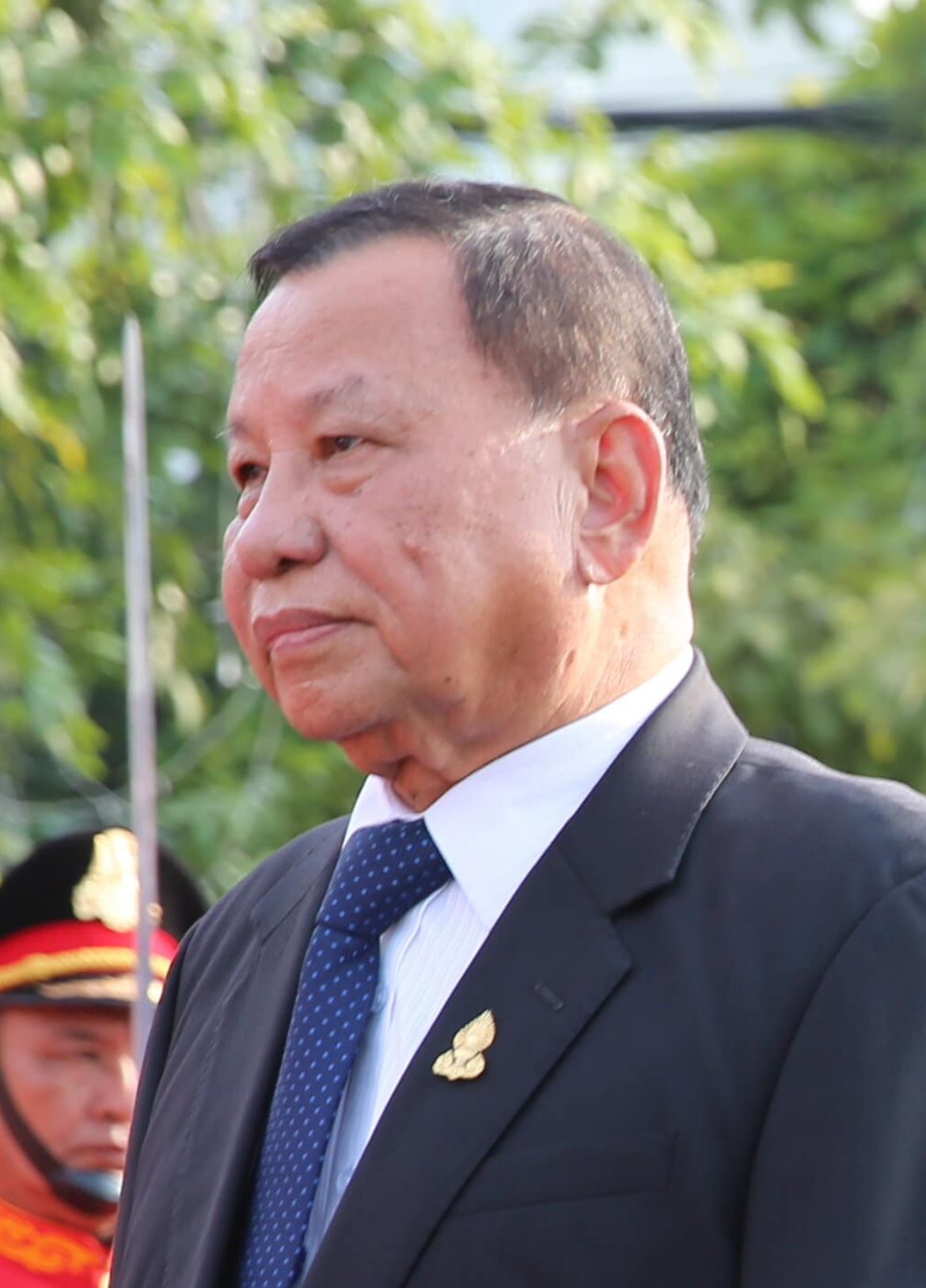
- Chhum in 2019

3rd President of the Senate
- In office 9 June 2015 – 3 April 2024
- Monarch: Norodom Sihamoni
- Vice President: See list: Ney Pena Tep Ngorn Sim Ka
- Preceded by: Chea Sim
- Succeeded by: Hun Sen

Vice President of the Cambodian People's Party
- Incumbent
- Assumed office 20 June 2015 Serving with Sar Kheng, Tea Banh and Men Sam An, and Hun Manet
- President: Hun Sen
- Preceded by: Hun Sen

Second Vice President of the National Assembly
- In office 21 March 2006 – 25 April 2012
- President: Heng Samrin
- Preceded by: Nguon Nhel
- Succeeded by: Khuon Sodary

First Vice President of the Senate
- In office 24 March 2012 – 9 June 2015
- President: Chea Sim
- Succeeded by: Ney Pena

Member of Parliament for Kampong Speu
- In office 14 June 1993 – 24 March 2012

Personal details
- Born: 5 February 1945 (age 81) Kampong Cham, Cambodia, French Indochina
- Party: Cambodian People's Party
- Children: 3, incl. Say Sam Al

Say Chhum (Khmer: សាយ ឈុំ; born 5 February 1945) is a Cambodian politician who most recently served as the president of the Senate of Cambodia from 2015 to 2024. He was the first vice president of the Senate until June 2015, when he succeeded Chea Sim upon the latter's death. He served as the Chairman of the Permanent Committee of the Central Committee of the Cambodian People's Party.

He was elected to represent Kampong Speu Province in the National Assembly in 2003. He also served as Second Vice-President of the National Assembly.

As First Vice-President of the Senate, Say Chhum served as acting Senate President when the ailing Chea Sim was absent. Shortly after Chea Sim's death, Say Chhum was unanimously elected as President of the Senate on 9 June 2015 by the 51 senators present.

His son, Say Sam Al, was appointed Minister of the Environment in 2013.
