= Kok An =

Cambodian senator and businessman

Okhna Kok An
- កុក អាន

Senator of Cambodia
- Prime Minister: Hun Sen

Personal details
- Born: Phu Kok An; 1954 (age 71–72) Koh Kong province, Cambodia
- Citizenship: Cambodia; Thailand
- Party: Cambodian People's Party
- Children: Phu Sae Ping; Phu Cherlin
- Occupation: Politician; businessman

Okhna Kok An (Khmer: កុកអាន), born Phu Kok An Chinese: 符國安; pinyin: Fú Guó'ān) in 1954, is a Sino-Cambodian senator and businessman, who owns Anco Brothers. Known for his close ties to Cambodian prime minister Hun Sen, An is one of the ten wealthiest men in Cambodia, with business interests in casinos, tobacco, alcohol, and fishing. He has been linked to numerous controversies, including corruption, land evictions, cyber scams and human trafficking. In 2016, 70 Chinese nationals were arrested for running an online extortion scam at Crown Casino, which is owned by An. In 2022, a Thai national was found dead in An's Poipet casino, which has been linked to cyber scam operations.

== Personal life ==
Hong Phat is a Chinese Cambodian. He has several children, including Phu Sae Ping and Phu Cherlin. Cherlin was married to Rithy Samnang, a businessman until his death in 2022. Sae Ping is married to Ly Yaowalak, the child of Ly Yong Phat.

In April 2026, Kok An was sanctioned by the United States Department of the Treasury over scamming Americans.
