= Ho Vann =

Cambodian politician

Member of Parliament for Phnom Penh
- In office 25 November 1998 – 16 November 2017
- Majority: 125,529 (18.91%)

Chairman of the Parliamentary Commission on Investigation and Anti-Corruption
- In office 27 August 2014 – 16 November 2017
- Preceded by: Commission established

Personal details
- Born: 20 September 1947 (age 79) Tram Kak, Takéo
- Party: Cambodia National Rescue Party (2012–17); Sam Rainsy Party (1998–2013)
- Children: 2
- Education: Royal University of Law and Economics

Ho Vann (Khmer: ហូរ វ៉ាន់) is a Cambodian politician. He belongs to the Cambodia National Rescue Party and was elected to represent Phnom Penh in the National Assembly of Cambodia in 2003 and re-elected most recently in 2013.
