= Ieu Pannakar =

Cambodian film director and statesman (1931–2018)

- អៀវ បណ្ណាការ

Member of the Senate
- In office 25 March 1999 – 23 April 2018
- Nominated by: Norodom Sihanouk

Personal details
- Born: 21 February 1931
- Died: 10 May 2018 (aged 87) Phnom Penh, Cambodia
- Party: Independent
- Spouse: Oum Sophanith
- Relations: Ieu Koeus (father)

Ieu Pannakar (Note: Khmer: អៀវ បណ្ណាការ, romanized: Iaw Pănnaka; Khmer pronunciation: [iəw pan.naː.kaː]) (21 February 1931 – 10 May 2018) was a Cambodian film director and statesman. Among the first Cambodians to study film making, he was one of Cambodia's pioneering film directors. He was a co-founder (with fellow Cambodian director Rithy Panh) of Bophana: The Audio-Visual Resource Center - Cambodia. Pannakar served as honorary president of Bophana's oversight organisation, the ARPAA, or Association pour la recherche, la production et l’archivage des documents audiovisuels.

Pannaker served in the Senate of Cambodia, as a nominee of King Norodom Sihamoni.
