= Chea Sim =

Cambodian politician (1932–2015)

Samdech Akka Moha Thamma Pothisal Chea Sim
- ជា ស៊ីម
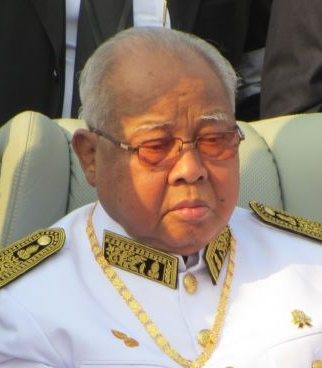
- Sim in 2012

President of the Senate
- In office 25 March 1999 – 8 June 2015
- Monarchs: Norodom Sihanouk; Norodom Sihamoni
- Preceded by: Saukam Khoy (1972)
- Succeeded by: Say Chhum

President of the Cambodian People's Party
- In office 17 October 1991 – 8 June 2015
- Deputy: Hun Sen
- Preceded by: Heng Samrin as General Secretary
- Succeeded by: Hun Sen

President of the National Assembly
- In office 6 October 1993 – 25 November 1998
- Monarch: Norodom Sihanouk
- President: Heng Samrin; Himself
- Preceded by: Son Sann
- Succeeded by: Norodom Ranariddh
- In office 27 June 1981 – 14 June 1993
- Preceded by: Nuon Chea as President of the Standing Committee
- Succeeded by: Son Sann

Acting Head of State
- In office c. 16 July 1997 – c. 7 August 1997
- Preceded by: Norodom Sihanouk
- Succeeded by: Norodom Sihanouk
- In office 7 October 2004 – c. 14 October 2004
- Preceded by: Norodom Sihanouk
- Succeeded by: Norodom Sihamoni

President of the Council of State
- Interim; 6 April 1992 – 14 June 1993
- Prime Minister: Hun Sen
- Preceded by: Heng Samrin
- Succeeded by: Norodom Sihanouk

Leader of Cambodia
- De facto 22 February 1992 or 15 March 1992 – c. late June 1992
- Preceded by: Himself (as De facto leader of the State of Cambodia)
- Succeeded by: None

Leader of the State of Cambodia
- De facto 1990 – 22 February 1992 or 15 March 1992
- Prime Minister: Pen Sovan
- Preceded by: Hun Sen
- Succeeded by: Himself (as De facto leader of Cambodia)

Minister of Interior
- In office 8 January 1979 – 27 June 1981
- Preceded by: Unknown
- Succeeded by: Sar Kheng (1992)

Personal details
- Born: 15 November 1932 Romeas Haek, Svay Rieng, Cambodia, French Indochina
- Died: 8 June 2015 (aged 82) Phnom Penh, Cambodia
- Party: Cambodian People's Party
- Other political affiliations: Kampuchean People's Revolutionary Party (1979–1991)
- Spouse: Nhem Soeun

Military service
- Allegiance: Cambodia
- Branch/service: Royal Cambodian Army
- Rank: General of the Army

Chea Sim (Khmer: ជា ស៊ីម; 15 November 1932 – 8 June 2015) was a Cambodian politician who served as President of the Cambodian People's Party from 1991 to 2015 and President of the National Assembly of Cambodia from 1981 to 1998 (Vice President from June to October 1993) and President of the Senate from 1999 to 2015. His official title was Samdech Akka Moha Thamma Pothisal Chea Sim (Khmer: សម្តេចអគ្គមហាធម្មពោធិ៍សាល ជា ស៊ីម).

== Life and career ==
Chea Sim was born on 15 November 1932, in Romeas Haek, Svay Rieng Province to an ethnic Chinese family. As a young man, he partook in one of the first revolutionary movement by the communist Khmer People's Revolutionary Party (Khmer: គណបក្សប្រជាជនបដិវត្តន៍កម្ពុជា, KPRP), currently the ruling party of Cambodia. The movement which he joined was against Colonial France in the early 1950s. He later became a military commander of the communist Khmer Rouge even before it finally toppled the US-backed Lon Nol government in 1975.

Like Heng Samrin and Hun Sen, he defected in 1978 from the Khmer Rouge, which was backed by China, and fled to Vietnam to join an anti-Khmer Rouge movement known as a resistance faction groomed by Vietnam. He later held positions in the new party and People's Republic of Kampuchea government, installed and backed by Vietnam after it invaded Cambodia and ousted the Khmer Rouge in 1979. He was among the founding members of the United Front for the National Salvation of Kampuchea, the Vietnam-backed group that defeated the Khmer Rouge in 1979.

Chea Sim was considered an important figure when negotiations happened, resulting in the 1991 Paris Peace Accord, which brokered a deal supposed to end three decades of civil war and paved the way for the U.N.-organized elections in 1993. After the elections, even though the royalist FUNCINPEC party topped the polls at that time, Hun Sen insisted that it share power with his Cambodian People's Party, and four years later grabbed the sole power for his Cambodia People's Party.

From 6 April 1992 to 14 June 1993, Chea Sim served as the nation's interim leader (Chairman of the Council of State) before Cambodia became a constitutional monarchy. He also acted as Head of State on behalf of King Norodom Sihanouk for brief periods in 1993, 1994, 1995 and 2004. Sihanouk awarded Chea Sim the honorary title of Sâmdech in 1993.

After the King announced his permanent abdication on 7 October 2004, Chea Sim once again became acting Head of State. In the same year, he was escorted out of the country after refusing to sign off as acting head of state on changing the constitution, which would eventually help the CPP and the Funcinpec parties form a coalition government under the deal between Hun Sen and prince Norodom Ranariddh.

Many saw it as the first-ever public display of power struggle and infighting between Hun Sen and Chea Sim. Subsequently, Hun Sen continued his tactic of replacing Chea Sim's loyalists with his favourite candidates for important roles in the party and government. Chea Sim had led a powerful faction within the ruling CPP party which was at times at odds with Hun Sen and his supporters, but many describe Sim's role after that as little more than symbolic.

== Illness and death ==
Chea Sim left the position of acting Head of State on 14 October 2004, when Norodom Sihamoni became king. He was absent from the 63rd anniversary celebrations of the CPP in June 2014, following years in which age and illness from high blood pressure, diabetes, and other chronic ailments forced him to back away from his roles and receive medical care in Vietnam. The Phnom Penh Post reported that Hun Sen was publicly referred to as “acting CPP president” for the first time at the anniversary event. In the months leading to his death, Chea Sim's signature continued to appear on documents passed by the Senate, of which he was president, but which was in practice presided over by his Deputy President, Say Chhum.

He died on 8 June 2015. Norodom Sihamoni, King of Cambodia, signed a royal decree to establish a commission to organize the funeral of Chea Sim. The commission was chaired by Heng Samrin, President of the National Assembly along with three vice chairmen, including Prime Minister Hun Sen; Say Chhum, Acting President of Senate; Kong Sam Ol, Deputy Prime Minister and Minister of the Royal Palace. Cambodia scheduled a formal mourning ceremony for Chea Sim for 19 June 2015.

== Commentary ==
Human Rights Watch Asia Director Brad Adams described it as a "mockery of justice" that Chea Sim was able to continue being one of the rulers of the post-Khmer Rouge government without being brought to justice, as Chea Sim was accused of overseeing atrocities committed under his role as a military commander. Brad Adams also accused Chea Sim of operating "a police state" in the 1980s that arrested, imprisoned, and tortured Cambodian political activists without trial.

Minister of Information Khieu Kanharith criticized The Phnom Penh Post for publishing an article which accused Chea Sim of violating human rights under the Khmer Rouge regime. Khieu Kanharith said that in the Cambodian tradition, respect for the dead is very important during the mourning ceremony and that The Phnom Penh Post could be sued if Chea Sim's family members wished to do so.

AKP argued, in that barbaric regime, Samdech Chea Sim was just a simple local official. AKP argued Chea Sim and his family members were also victims (of the regime) as other Cambodian people. The spokesperson of the Ministry of Interior strongly rejected the comments made by Director of Asia Division for Human Rights Watch and quoted by The Phnom Penh Post.

Sam Rainsy, the leader and co-founder of the main opposition party, Cambodia National Rescue Party, and a member of Parliament (MP) for Kampong Cham since July 2014, hailed Chea Sim as a national hero and likened him to the popular late king Norodom Sihanouk who, Rainsy said, considered Chea Sim as his "little brother". Once considered as the second most powerful man in the government after Hun Sen, Chea Sim, as Rainsy said, was highly regarded for his patriotic ideals and national reconciliation after the Khmer Rouge.

== Political positions ==
Chea Sim was seen as a strong nationalist and a traditionalist.

== See also ==
- People's Republic of Kampuchea

Political offices
Preceded by None	President of the National Assembly of Cambodia; 1981–1993	Succeeded by Son Sann
Preceded by Heng Samrin	Chairman of the State Council of Cambodia; 1992–1993	Succeeded by None
Preceded by Son Sann	President of the National Assembly of Cambodia; 1993–1998	Succeeded by Norodom Ranariddh
Preceded by Saukam Khoy	President of the Senate of Cambodia; 1999–2015	Succeeded by Say Chhum
Preceded by Norodom Sihanouk as King of Cambodia	Interim Head of State of Cambodia; 2004	Succeeded by Norodom Sihamoni as King of Cambodia
Party political offices
Preceded by Heng Samrin as General Secretary of the People's Revolutionary Party	President of the Cambodian People's Party; 1991–2015	Succeeded by Hun Sen
