= Bou Thang =

Cambodian politician (1938–2019)

- ប៊ូ ថង

Senator of Cambodia
- In office 2012–2018

Member of the National Assembly
- Incumbent
- Assumed office 2003
- Constituency: Ratanakiri Province

Personal details
- Born: August 15, 1938
- Died: September 12, 2019 (aged 81)
- Party: Cambodian People's Party

Bou Thang (Khmer: ប៊ូ ថង, 15 August 1938 – 12 September 2019) was a Cambodian politician, Senator, Chairman of the Committee Interior and Defense of the Senate (term 2012-2018). He belonged to the Cambodian People's Party and was elected to represent Ratanakiri Province in the National Assembly of Cambodia in 2003. Thang was a member of the Tampuan ethnic group.

== Bibliography ==
- Strangio, Sebastian (2014). Hun Sen's Cambodia. United States of America: Yale University Press. ISBN 978-0300210149.
