= Tep Ngorn =

Cambodian politician

Tep Ngorn is a Cambodian politician. He belongs to the Cambodian People's Party and was elected to represent Kandal Province in the National Assembly of Cambodia in 2003.
