= Sim Ka =

Cambodian politician

Sim Ka is a Cambodian senator. He is a member of the Cambodian People's Party Central Committee and was elected to represent Phnom Penh in the National Assembly of Cambodia in 2003. Ka was Acting President of the Cambodian Senate in 2020 and 2021. He was elected First Vice President in 2018, replacing Ney Pena, who died.
