= Cambodian People's Party =

Ruling party of Cambodia since 1979

Cambodian People's Party គណបក្សប្រជាជនកម្ពុជា
- Logo of the party, featuring an angel spreading flowers, surrounded by golden rice stalks and a demi cogwheel.
- Abbreviation: CPP
- President: Hun Sen
- Vice Presidents: Say Chhum; Sar Kheng; Tea Banh; Men Sam An; Hun Manet
- Founders: Son Ngoc Minh; Tou Samouth
- Founded: 28 June 1951 (75 years, 130 days) (claim) 5 January 1979 (47 years, 304 days) (as KPRP) 17 October 1991 (35 years, 19 days) (as CPP)
- Preceded by: Kampuchean People's Revolutionary Party
- Headquarters: 7 January Palace, 203 Norodom Boulevard, Phnom Penh
- Youth wing: Central Youth of the Cambodian People's Party
- Armed wing: Kampuchean People's Revolutionary Armed Forces (1979–1991) Cambodian People's Armed Forces (1991–1993)
- Membership (2023): ▲7,100,000
- Ideology: Cambodian nationalism; Conservatism; Monarchism; Social market economy
- Political position: Big tent (Note: The party presents itself as big tent, although it has also been described as left-wing, leftist, and left-conservative.)
- National affiliation: Kampuchean United Front for National Salvation (1979–1981) Kampuchean United Front for National Construction and Defence (1981–2006) Solidarity Front for Development of the Cambodian Motherland
- International affiliation: Centrist Democrat International; For the Freedom of Nations!
- Colors: Sky blue
- Slogan: "ឯករាជ្យ សន្តិភាព សេរីភាព ប្រជាធិបតេយ្យ អព្យាក្រឹត និងវឌ្ឍនភាពសង្គម" ("Independence, Peace, Freedom, Democracy, Neutrality and Social Progress")
- Anthem: "បទចម្រៀងនៃគណបក្សប្រជាជនកម្ពុជា" ("Anthem of the Cambodian People's Party") (Note: The official ceremonial party anthem, which is used as ceremonial anthem by opposition parties too during official meetings, is also known as "គោរពទង់គណបក្សប្រជាជនកម្ពុជា" ("Saluting the Cambodian People's Party flag") as it is played during flag ceremonies and "ម្ភៃប្រាំបីមិថុនា ឆ្នាំហាសិបមួយ បក្សប្រជាជន ប្រយុទ្ធតស៊ូ ដើម្បីបុព្វហេតុ ជាតិមាតុភូមិ" ("28 June 1951, the People's Party fought for the cause of the nation and the homeland") due to this phrase being the first two lines of the lyrics.)
- Senate: 55 / 62 (89%)
- National Assembly: 120 / 125 (96%)
- Commune chiefs: 1,648 / 1,652 (100%)
- Commune councillors: 9,376 / 11,622 (81%)
- Provincial, municipal, town and district councillors: 3,761 / 4,114 (91%)
- Provincial governors: 25 / 25 (100%)

Party flag

Website
- cpp.org.kh

The Cambodian People's Party (CPP; Khmer: គណបក្សប្រជាជនកម្ពុជា, romanized: Keanapak Pracheachon Kampuchea [keanapaʔ prɑciəcɔn kampuciə]) is a political party in Cambodia which has ruled the country since 1979. Founded in that same year, it was originally known as the Kampuchean People's Revolutionary Party (KPRP). (Note: Khmer: គណបក្សប្រជាជនបដិវត្តន៍កម្ពុជា, UNGEGN: Keanapak Pracheachon Padevoat Kampuchea; Khmer pronunciation: [keanapaʔ prɑciəcɔn paɗeʋɔət kampuciə])

During the Cold War, the CPP allied itself with Vietnam and the Soviet Union, in contrast to the pro-Chinese Communist Party of Kampuchea (CPK) led by Pol Pot. After toppling the Khmer Rouge's Democratic Kampuchea regime with the Vietnamese-backed liberation of Phnom Penh, it became the ruling party of the People's Republic of Kampuchea (1979–1989), which was later renamed the State of Cambodia (1989–1991). The party's current name was adopted during the final year of the State of Cambodia, when the party abandoned the one-party system and Marxism–Leninism.

Originally rooted in communist and Marxist–Leninist ideologies, the party took on a more reformist outlook in the mid-1980s under Heng Samrin. In 1991, the CPP officially dropped its commitment to socialism, and has since embraced a mixed economy. Along with some major parties of the European centre-right, the CPP is a member of the Centrist Democrat International. CPP presents itself as a big tent of supporters of the Prime Minister Hun Sen, and after him his son Hun Manet. Nevertheless, the party met with the Socialist International in 2004 and remains a close ally of the Communist Party of Vietnam (CPV). The CPP claims an official membership of more than 7 million members, making it one of the largest political parties in the world.

The party's rule has been described as authoritarian. (Note: Attributed to multiple sources:)

== History ==
=== Forerunner organizations and early history ===
Nationalists in Cambodia, Vietnam and Laos held the belief that to successfully liberate themselves from France they needed to work together; the nationalists formed the supranational Indochinese Communist Party (ICP) to oppose the French in 1930.

However, the triumph of the Japanese during the early stage of World War II crippled French rule and helped to nurture nationalism in all three Indochinese countries. Consequently, the idea of an Indochinese-wide party was submerged in the rhetoric of fierce nationalism. In Cambodia, growing nationalist sentiment and national pride married historical mistrust and fear of neighbouring countries, which turned out to be a stumbling block for the ICP. On 28 June 1951, the Cambodian nationalists who struggled to free Cambodia from French colonial rule split from the ICP to form the Kampuchean People's Revolutionary Party (KPRP).

In 1955, the KPRP established a subsidiary party named the Pracheachon in order to run in the national election that year. The name of the party was changed to the Workers' Party of Kampuchea (WPK) on 28 September 1960 and then to the Communist Party of Kampuchea (CPK) in 1966. Members of the CPK moved the party's headquarters to Ratanakiri Province, where they were termed "Khmer Rouge" by Prince Norodom Sihanouk.

=== Kampuchean People's Revolutionary Party (1979–1991) ===
In 5 January 1979, the Cambodian communists who overthrew the Khmer Rouge's regime to end the genocide held a congress and established the Kampuchean People's Revolutionary Party. At this gathering, they declared themselves the true successors of the original KPRP founded in 1951 and labelled the congress as the Third Party Congress, thus not recognizing the 1963, 1975 and 1978 congresses of CPK as legitimate. The party considered 28 June 1951 as its founding date.

=== Hun Sen's leadership (1991–2023) ===
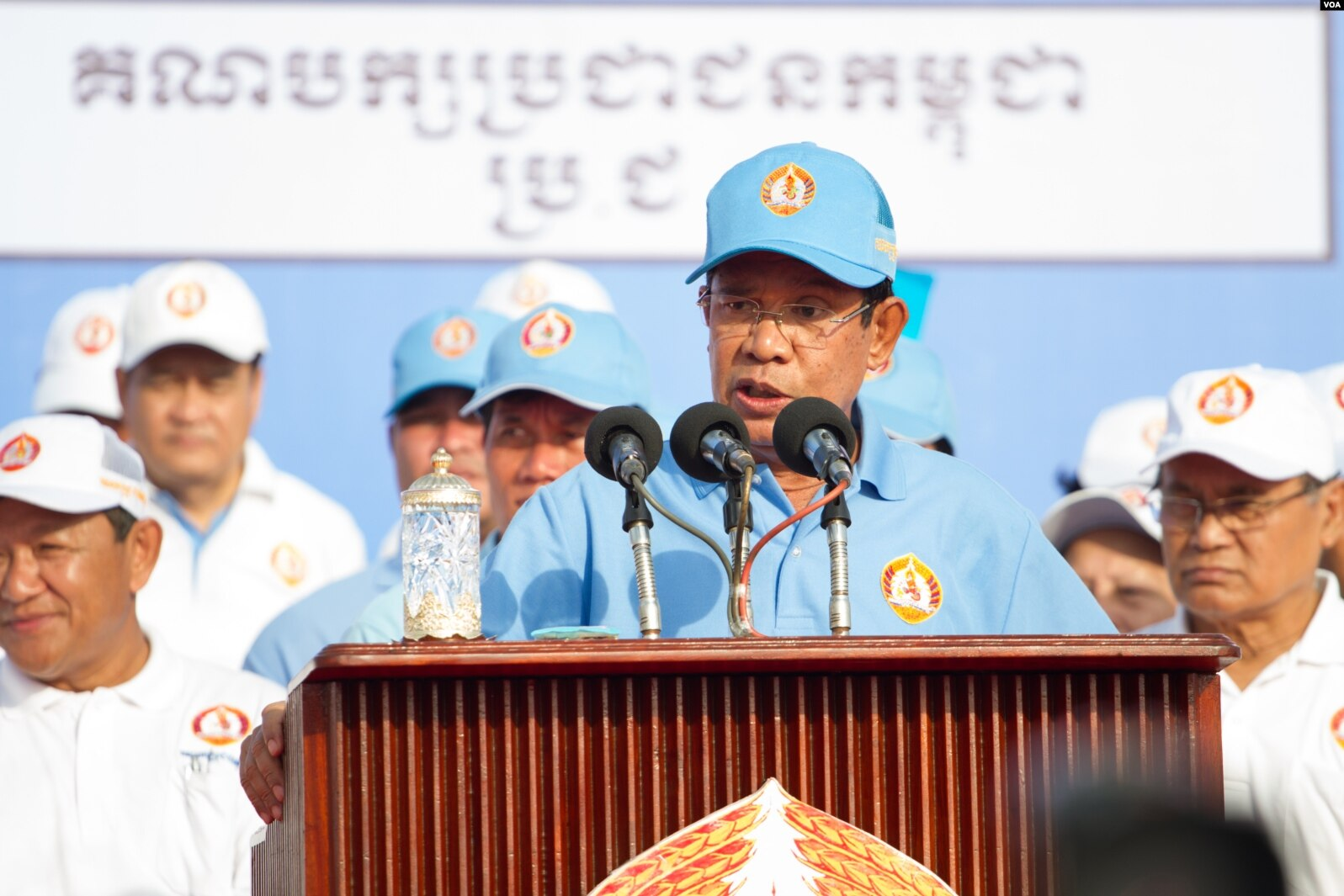
Hun Sen addresses the crowd at a campaign rally in Phnom Penh.

In 1991, the party was renamed to the Cambodian People's Party (CPP) during a United Nations-sponsored peace and reconciliation process. Politburo and the Secretariat to enter into the new Standing Committee, Chea Sim as President and Hun Sen as Vice-president. Despite being rooted in socialism, the party adopted a pragmatic approach in order to keep power. For instance, the CPP played a major role in Cambodian peace negotiation process, which led to the signing of the Paris Peace Accords on 23 October 1991 and the creation of the second Kingdom of Cambodia. The CPP ousted Nodorom Ranariddh in a coup in 1997, leaving the party with no serious opposition. Thirty-two people died in the coup.

Under CPP rule, Cambodia transitioned into a lower-middle-income economy in 2016. The party aims to turn Cambodia into a higher-middle-income country by 2030 and high-income country by 2050. Ideologically, an increasing number of CPP senior leaders claim that the Cambodian ruling party has adopted a centrist position. They believe that the CPP presents a middle path between capitalism and communism, with emphasis on the values and principles of social market economy along with social and environmental protection, and Buddhist humanism. However, academics such as John Ciorciari have observed that the CPP still continues to maintain its communist-era party structures and that many of its top-ranking members were derived from KPRP. Also, despite Hun Sen being only the deputy leader of the party until 2015, he had de facto control of the party.

Political scientists Radek Buben, Elvin Franisco Rodríguez Fabilena and Karel Kouba classify the CPP under Hun Sen as left-wing, comparing it to the Sandinista National Liberation Front (FSLN) in terms of both authoritarian governance and representing formerly far-left revolutionary organizations that transitioned into a more reformist type of governance. The Palgrave Handbook of Political Norms in Southeast Asia described the CPP as "leftist conservatives". The party was also described as "left-leaning" in a Deutsche Welle article in 2012. Sreinith Ten also argues that the party "had embedded the legacy of communism based on Marxist-Leninist ideology", and continues to cling onto socialist-oriented rhetoric and policies to maintain legitimacy, such as through promoting gender egalitarianism and establishing state-backed organizations such as the Kampuchea Revolutionary Women's Association. The CPP hosted a Socialist International meeting in 2004, remains a close ally of the Communist Party of Vietnam (CPV), and most of the party members are former communists. The CPP also retains socialist party organisation.

It won 64 of the 123 seats in the National Assembly in the 1998 elections, 73 seats in the 2003 elections and 90 seats in the 2008 elections, winning the popular vote by the biggest margin ever for a National Assembly election with 58% of the vote. The CPP also won the 2006 Senate elections. The party lost 22 seats in the 2013 elections, with opposition gained. In the 2018 elections, the party won all 125 seats in the National Assembly and 58 of 62 seats in the Senate. The main opposition, the Cambodia National Rescue Party (CNRP), was banned before the election. Since the 2023 elections, the party commands 120 of 125 seats in the National Assembly, and 55 of 62 seats in the Senate. Hun Sen, the former Prime Minister of Cambodia, has served as the CPP's President since 2015.

== Party leadership (1979–1993) ==
- Heng Samrin:
  - General Secretary of the KPRP (1981–1991)
  - Chairman of the Revolutionary Council (later the Council of State) (1979–1992)
- Chea Sim:
  - Minister of the Interior (1979–1981)
  - President of the National Assembly (1981–92),
  - Chairman of the Council of State (1992–1994)
- Pen Sovan:
  - Minister of Defense (1979–1981);
  - General Secretary of the KPRP (1979–1981);
  - Prime Minister (1981)
- Hun Sen:
  - Minister of Foreign Affairs (1979–1986; 1987–1990);
  - Deputy Prime Minister (1981–85),
  - Prime Minister (1985–1993)
- Chan Sy:
  - Minister of defense (1981–1982),
  - Prime Minister (1981–1984)
- Say Phouthang:
  - Vice President of the State Council (1979–1993)
  - Chairman of the Central Committee
- Chea Soth:
  - Minister of Planning (1982–1986),
  - Deputy Prime Minister (1982–1992)
- Bou Thang:
  - Deputy Prime Minister (1982–1992),
  - Minister of Defense (1982–1986)
- Math Ly:
  - Vice President of the National Assembly
- Kong Korm:
  - Minister of Foreign Affairs (1986–1987)
- Hor Namhong:
  - Minister of Foreign Affairs (1990–1993)

== List of party leaders ==
=== Presidents ===
KPRP (General Secretary) CPP (President)

No.	Portrait	Name (Birth–Death)	Term of office			Office held	Vice President
No.	Portrait	Name (Birth–Death)	From	To	Duration	Office held	Vice President
1		Tou Samouth ទូ សាមុត (1915–1962)	21 September 1951	30 September 1960	9 years, 9 days	―	―
2		Pen Sovan ប៉ែន សុវណ្ណ (1936–2016)	5 January 1979	5 December 1981	2 years, 334 days	Minister of Defence (1979–1981) Prime Minister (1981)	―
3		Heng Samrin ហេង សំរិន (born 1934)	5 December 1981	17 October 1991	9 years, 316 days	Chairman of the People's Revolutionary Council (1979–1981), President of the Council of State (1981–1992), President of the National Assembly (2006–2023)	―
4		Chea Sim ជា ស៊ីម (1932–2015)	17 October 1991	8 June 2015†	23 years, 234 days	Chairman of the National Assembly (1981–1993), President of the Council of State (1992–1993), President of the Senate (1999–2015)	Hun Sen
5		Hun Sen ហ៊ុន សែន (born 1952)	20 June 2015	Present	11 years, 138 days	Minister of Foreign Affairs (1979–1986, 1988–1990), Prime Minister (1985–2023), President of the Senate (2024–present)	Say Chhum
5		Hun Sen ហ៊ុន សែន (born 1952)	20 June 2015	Present	11 years, 138 days	Minister of Foreign Affairs (1979–1986, 1988–1990), Prime Minister (1985–2023), President of the Senate (2024–present)	Sar Kheng
5		Hun Sen ហ៊ុន សែន (born 1952)	20 June 2015	Present	11 years, 138 days	Minister of Foreign Affairs (1979–1986, 1988–1990), Prime Minister (1985–2023), President of the Senate (2024–present)	Tea Banh
5		Hun Sen ហ៊ុន សែន (born 1952)	20 June 2015	Present	11 years, 138 days	Minister of Foreign Affairs (1979–1986, 1988–1990), Prime Minister (1985–2023), President of the Senate (2024–present)	Men Sam An
5		Hun Sen ហ៊ុន សែន (born 1952)	20 June 2015	Present	11 years, 138 days	Minister of Foreign Affairs (1979–1986, 1988–1990), Prime Minister (1985–2023), President of the Senate (2024–present)	Hun Manet

=== Vice Presidents ===
- Say Chhum, President of the Senate (9 June 2015 – 3 April 2024)
- Sar Kheng, Minister of Interior (3 February 1992 – 22 August 2023)
- Tea Banh, Minister of National Defence (1987 – 22 August 2023)
- Men Sam An, Deputy Prime Minister of Cambodia (25 September 2008 – 22 August 2023)
- Hun Manet, Prime Minister of Cambodia (22 August 2023 – present)

== Organization ==
The party is headed by a 32-member Permanent Committee, commonly referred to as the Politburo (after its former Communist namesake). The current members are (with their party positions in brackets):

1. Hun Sen (Chairman)
2. Heng Samrin (Honorary Chairman)
3. Sar Kheng (Deputy Chairman)
4. Say Chhum (Chairman of the Standing Committee)
5. Say Phouthang
6. Bou Thang
7. Tea Banh
8. Men Sam An
9. Nguon Nhel
10. Ney Pena
11. Sim Ka
12. Ke Kim Yan
13. Pol Saroeun
14. Kong Sam Ol
15. Im Chhun Lim
16. Dith Munty
17. Chea Chanto
18. Uk Rabun
19. Cheam Yeap
20. Ek Sam Ol
21. Som Kim Suor
22. Khuon Sudary
23. Pen Pannha
24. Chhay Than
25. Hor Nam Hong
26. Bin Chhin
27. Keat Chhon
28. Yim Chhay Ly
29. Tep Ngorn
30. Kun Kim
31. Meas Sophea
32. Neth Savoeun

== Electoral history ==
=== National Assembly elections ===
Year	Leader	Candidate	Votes			Seats		Position	Government
Year	Leader	Candidate	#	%	±	#	±	Position	Government
1981	Pen Sovan		2,898,709	90.3	New	117 / 117	New	1st	KPRP
1993	Chea Sim	Hun Sen	1,533,471	38.2	▼52.1	51 / 120	▼66	▼2nd	FUNCINPEC–CPP–BLDP–MOULINAKA
1998	Chea Sim	Hun Sen	2,030,790	41.4	▲3.2	64 / 122	▲13	▲1st	CPP–FUNCINPEC
2003	Chea Sim	Hun Sen	2,447,259	47.3	▲5.9	73 / 123	▲9	1st	CPP–FUNCINPEC
2008	Chea Sim	Hun Sen	3,492,374	58.1	▲10.8	90 / 123	▲17	1st	CPP–FUNCINPEC
2013	Chea Sim	Hun Sen	3,235,969	48.8	▼9.3	68 / 123	▼22	1st	CPP
2018	Hun Sen		4,889,113	76.8	▲28.0	125 / 125	▲57	1st	CPP
2023	Hun Sen	Hun Manet	6,398,311	82.3	▲5.5	120 / 125	▼5	1st	CPP–FUNCINPEC

=== Communal elections ===
Year	Leader	Votes			Chiefs		Councillors		Position
Year	Leader	#	%	±	#	±	#	±	Position
2002	Hun Sen	2,647,849	60.9	New	1,598 / 1,621	New	7,552 / 11,261	New	1st
2007	Hun Sen	3,148,533	60.8	▼0.1	1,591 / 1,621	▼7	7,993 / 11,353	▲441	1st
2012	Hun Sen	3,631,082	61.8	▲1.0	1,592 / 1,633	▲1	8,292 / 11,459	▲299	1st
2017	Hun Sen	3,540,056	50.8	▼11.0	1,156 / 1,646	▼436	6,503 / 11,572	▼1,789	1st
2022	Hun Sen	5,378,773	74.3	▲23.5	1,648 / 1,652	▲492	9,376 / 11,622	▲2,873	1st

=== Senate elections ===
Year	Candidate	Votes			Seats		Position
Year	Candidate	#	%	±	#	±	Position
2006	Chea Sim	7,854	69.2	—	45 / 61	▲14	1st
2012	Chea Sim	8,880	77.8	▲8.6	46 / 61	▲1	1st
2018	Say Chhum	11,202	95.9	▲18.1	58 / 62	▲12	1st
2024	Hun Sen	10,052	85.9	▼10.0	55 / 62	▼3	1st

== See also ==
- History of Cambodia
- Cambodian–Vietnamese War
- People's Republic of Kampuchea
- State of Cambodia
