= Spouse of the prime minister of Cambodia =

Spouse of the Prime Minister of Cambodia
- ស្វាមីភរិយារបស់នាយករដ្ឋមន្ត្រីនៃកម្ពុជា
- Incumbent; Pich Chanmony since 22 August 2023
- Style: Her Excellency (formal, diplomatic)
- Residence: Peace Palace
- Formation: 18 March 1945; 81 years ago

The spouse of the prime minister of Cambodia refers to the wife or husband of the head of government of the Kingdom of Cambodia, the Prime Minister. Since 1993, 3 women have been the spouse of the Prime Minister of Cambodia.

The spouse of the current prime minister is Pich Chanmony.

== Role ==
The position is not an elected position, thus the spouse of the prime minister does not hold any official duties. The spouse of the prime minister of Cambodia frequently participates in humanitarian and charitable work as well as representing the prime minister. The incumbent Bun Rany holds the position of President of the Cambodian Red Cross.

== Spouses (since 1993) ==
No.	Portrait	Name	Tenure	Length of tenure	Prime Minister (Spouse)	Term
1	Photo of Norodom Marie Ranariddh	Norodom Marie Ranariddh (b. 1947)	24 September 1993 – 6 August 1997	3 years, 316 days	First PM; Norodom Ranariddh m. 1968; div. 2010	1st (1993)
2	Photo of Bun Rany	Bun Rany (b. 1954)	24 September 1993 – 30 November 1998	5 years, 67 days	Second PM; Hun Sen m. 1976	1st (1993)
3		Ung Malis Yvonne	6 August 1997 – 30 November 1998	1 year, 116 days	First PM; Ung Huot	1st (1993)
(2)	Photo of Bun Rany	Bun Rany (b. 1954)	30 November 1998 – 22 August 2023	24 years, 266 days	Hun Sen m. 1976	2nd (1998)
(2)	Photo of Bun Rany	Bun Rany (b. 1954)	30 November 1998 – 22 August 2023	24 years, 266 days	Hun Sen m. 1976	3rd (2003)
(2)	Photo of Bun Rany	Bun Rany (b. 1954)	30 November 1998 – 22 August 2023	24 years, 266 days	Hun Sen m. 1976	4th (2008)
(2)	Photo of Bun Rany	Bun Rany (b. 1954)	30 November 1998 – 22 August 2023	24 years, 266 days	Hun Sen m. 1976	5th (2013)
(2)	Photo of Bun Rany	Bun Rany (b. 1954)	30 November 1998 – 22 August 2023	24 years, 266 days	Hun Sen m. 1976	6th (2018)
4		Pich Chanmony (b. 1980)	22 August 2023 – Incumbent	3 years, 17 days	Hun Manet m. 2006	7th (2023)

== See also ==
- Cambodian Red Cross
- List of prime ministers of Cambodia
