= Norodom Buppha Devi =

Cambodian princess, politician, and dancer (1943–2019)

Norodom Buppha Devi នរោត្តម បុប្ផាទេវី
- Princess of Cambodia
- Princess Buppha Devi in 1965

Minister of Culture and Fine Arts
- In office: 30 November 1998 – 15 July 2004
- Born: 8 January 1943; Phnom Penh, Cambodia, French Indochina
- Died: 18 November 2019 (aged 76); Bangkok, Thailand
- Issue: Sisowath Moni Kossoma; Sisowath Kalyan Tevi; Norodom Chansita; Sisowath Chivannariddh; Sisowath Veakchiravuddh
- House: Norodom
- Father: Norodom Sihanouk
- Mother: Phat Kanhol
- Religion: Theravada Buddhism

Styles of Norodom Buppha Devi
- Reference style: Her Royal Highness
- Spoken style: Your Royal Highness

Norodom Buppha Devi (Note: Khmer: នរោត្តម បុប្ផាទេវី; Nôrotdâm Bŏppha Tevi, [nɔ.roːt.ɗɑm ɓop.pʰaː teː.ʋiː]) (8 January 1943 – 18 November 2019) was a Cambodian princess, dancer, director of the Royal Ballet of Cambodia, senator, and Minister of Culture and Fine Arts. She was the daughter of Norodom Sihanouk and the late Neak Moneang Phat Kanhol, the elder sister of Prince Norodom Ranariddh, and a half-sibling of the current King of Cambodia, Norodom Sihamoni. Her official title was Her Royal Highness Sǎmdăch Riach Bŏtrei Preăh Riam Nôrotdâm Bŏppha Tevi (Khmer: សម្តេចរាជបុត្រីព្រះរៀមនរោត្តម បុប្ផាទេវី).

== Name ==

Buppha Devi derives from Pali words puppha (បុប្ផា), meaning flower, and devi (ទេវី), meaning goddess. The name is also romanised as "Bopha Devi" or "Bophadevi".

== Life and career ==
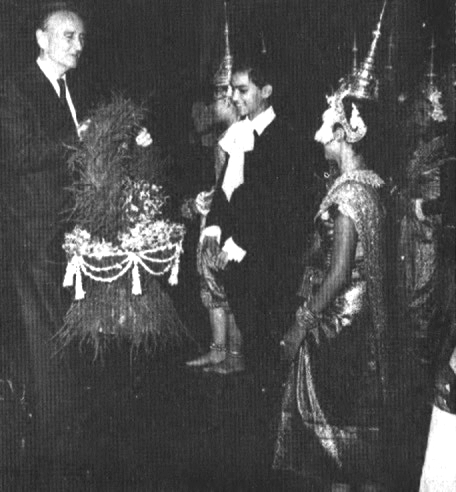
Princess Buppha Devi and her half-brother Norodom Sihamoni receiving a bouquet of flowers from US Senator Mike Mansfield, 1969.

Buppha Devi finished her high school education at Lycée Preah Norodom in Phnom Penh. As a young princess, her grandmother, Queen Sisowath Kossamak, chose her to become a dancer early in her life. At the age of 15, she became the premier dancer of the Royal Ballet of Cambodia. At the age of 18, she was granted the title of prima ballerina.

She then toured the world as the principal dancer of the Royal Ballet with Queen Kossamak, performing in public. In the past the ballet had been performed only before royalty to commemorate their dynastic ancestors and to honour the gods. For her dancing ability, her father Norodom Sihanouk cast her in his first feature-length film Apsara in 1966.

Buppha Devi served as Deputy Minister of Culture and Fine Arts from 1991–1993, advisor to the Royal Government in charge of Culture and Fine Arts from 1993–1998, Vice President of the Cambodian Red Cross from 1993–1997, President of the Cambodian-Chinese Association in the year 2000 and the Minister of Culture and Fine Arts from 1998–2004.

== Personal life ==
Buppha Devi married her first husband in 1959 at the age of fourteen. Her four total marriages produced five children:

1) Norodom Norinractevong

2) Sisowath Monichivann

- Princess Sisowath Moni Kossoma (born 1960)
- Princess Sisowath Kalyan Tevi (born 1961)

3) Bruno Jacques Forsinetti

- Keo Chansita Forsinetti (born 1965). She is now known as Norodom Chansita

4) Sisowath Chivanmonirak

- Prince Sisowath Chivannariddh (born 1968)
- Prince Sisowath Veakchiravuddh (born 1973)

== See also ==
- Voan Savay, prima ballerina of the Khmer Royal Ballet
