= Bun Rany =

Wife of Hun Sen (born 1954)

Samdech Kittipritbandit Bun Rany
- ប៊ុន រ៉ានី
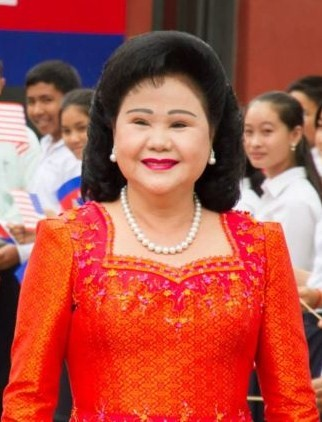
- Rany in 2015

President of the Cambodian Red Cross
- Incumbent
- Assumed office 30 April 1998
- Vice President: Pich Chanmony
- Preceded by: Norodom Marie

Spouse of the Prime Minister of Cambodia
- In role 30 November 1998 – 22 August 2023
- Prime Minister: Hun Sen
- Preceded by: Herself
- Succeeded by: Pich Chanmony
- In role 24 September 1993 – 30 November 1998; Alongside Norodom Marie (1993–1997) and Ung Malis Yvonne (1997–1998)
- Prime Minister: Norodom Ranariddh First Prime Minister (1993–1997) Ung Huot First Prime Minister (1997–1998); Hun Sen Second Prime Minister (1993–1998)
- Preceded by: Norodom Marie
- Succeeded by: Herself
- In role 14 January 1985 – 2 July 1993; Acting from 24 December 1984
- Prime Minister: Hun Sen
- Preceded by: Pham Thi Ien
- Succeeded by: Norodom Marie

Personal details
- Born: Bun Sam Hieng; 15 December 1954 (age 71) Krouch Chhmar, Kampong Cham, Cambodia
- Party: Cambodian People's Party
- Spouse: Hun Sen (m. 1976)
- Children: 6, including Manet, Manith, and Many
- Profession: Nurse
- Ethnicity: Chinese Cambodian
- Website: Cambodian Red Cross

Bun Rany (Khmer: ប៊ុន រ៉ានី, UNGEGN: Bŭn Rani [ɓun raːniː]; born 15 December 1954) is the wife of Cambodian Senate president and former prime minister Hun Sen. She also served as the vice president of the National Association of the Cambodian Red Cross and, since 1998, as its president. She has received national and international recognition and numerous awards for her work and endeavor with Cambodia's orphans and poor, HIV/AIDS awareness and prevention, and her emphasis on women's issues with efforts to improve domestic safety and empowerment through education and vocational training. Her full honorary title is Samdech Kittipritbandit Bun Rany Hun Sen (Khmer: សម្តេចកិត្តិព្រឹទ្ធបណ្ឌិត ប៊ុន រ៉ានី ហ៊ុនសែន; lit. 'Celebrated Senior Scholar Bun Rany Hun Sen').

Over the years, various media outlets and commentators have alleged that she was connected to violent attacks against women who were purported to have personal ties to her husband, claims that describe the killings as exceptionally brutal and politically sensitive. These allegations, which she has consistently denied and which have never resulted in formal legal findings, stand in stark contrast to her public role as a national humanitarian leader. Critics argue that the tension between her charitable activities and the unresolved accusations has contributed to a persistent public perception that she sought to suppress or obscure information related to the incidents, raising broader questions about accountability, political influence, and the intersection of personal and institutional power in contemporary Cambodia.

== Titles ==
As the wife of the Prime Minister, she was previously referred to as Lok Chumteav Bun Rany - Hun Sen (Khmer: លោកជំទាវប៊ុន រ៉ានី ហ៊ុន សែន). Lok Chumteav is a title for high-ranking female officials or the wives of high-ranking ministers or government officials. The name of her husband follows to indicate her title is due to her status as Hun Sen's wife. On 30 March 2011, Cambodian king Norodom Sihamoni granted her the title Kittipritbandit (Khmer: កិត្តិព្រឹទ្ធបណ្ឌិត), a title meaning roughly "Celebrated Senior Sage/Scholar/PhD" and equivalent to an honorary Doctorate in the Royal Academy of Cambodia. On 8 May 2013, King Sihamoni awarded her the title Samdech (Khmer: សម្ដេច), the highest bestowed title in the Khmer kingdom, thus making her full title Samdech Kittipritbandit Bun Rany Hun Sen (Khmer: សម្ដេចកិត្តិព្រឹទ្ធបណ្ឌិតប៊ុន រ៉ានី ហ៊ុន សែន). Although she should technically be addressed as Samdech, she is often informally referenced as Lok Chumtiew.

== Early life ==
Bun Rany was born Bun Sam Hieng to a Chinese-Khmer family in what was then the province of Kampong Cham, Cambodia in Roka Khnao, Krouch Chhmar District (now a part of Tbong Khmum Province). Her parents, Lin Kri and Bun Sieng Ly, were prosperous farmers who traced their ancestry to Kwangtung (Guangdong) in China. Rany has two brothers and three sisters. As children, before the Cambodian Civil War, they all walked half an hour to school, wading across the Roka Khnao River in the dry season or hitching a ferry ride across in the wet season when the water was too deep to cross. She has stated that her maternal grandparents' gentle instruction in Cambodian tradition was very influential in her later life. In 1970, when Rany was 16 years old, her grandparents died. Shortly thereafter, Prince Sihanouk was deposed by General Lon Nol. These two events deeply affected her and when the exiled Prince aligned with the Communist Khmer Rouge and issued a call for Cambodians to fight against Lon Nol's government, Rany secretly joined the National United Front of Kampuchea. The local cadres gave her a choice of positions. She chose the medical field and the leadership arranged for her training by doctors who had come from Phnom Penh to lecture fresh recruits. After six months of Khmer Rouge training, she was sent back to Krouch Chhmar with the title of Public Health Officer. By 1974, she was the director of a Khmer Rouge hospital located approximately 50 km from the front line of fighting against Lon Nol's Khmer Republic government forces.

== Marriage to Hun Sen ==
In March 1974, Rany met Hun Sen (through Le Duc Tho) who, having joined the Khmer Rouge in 1970, commanded most of the soldiers that were treated at her hospital. As the Khmer Rouge leadership forbade fraternization among the people and strictly controlled every facet of life, including courtship and marriage, they carried on a romance through intermediaries and occasionally on the pretense of official Party business. Hun Sen officially requested the Angkar to allow a marriage in late 1974 but despite his reputation as a good leader, was told to wait until Phnom Penh was captured and the whole country was under Khmer Rouge rule. In 1975, one day before the fall of Phnom Penh, Hun Sen was hit by shrapnel and lost his left eye. Considering him now to be disabled, Bun Rany's superiors decided he was not suitable for marriage and instead attempted to arrange for her to marry a series of prominent men in Krouch Chhmar District, all of whom she rejected. Likewise, Hun Sen's superiors attempted to find a "more suitable" partner for him, suggesting, among others, a high-ranking Party woman twelve years his senior. Their refusal to follow the orders of their superiors led to lowered esteem and suspicion of loyalties. In early 1976, the Angkar organized a group marriage ceremony with twelve wounded and handicapped soldiers and notified Hun Sen and Bun Rany that they could marry as part of this event. The group wedding took place with little ceremony in a very remote location with no family members in attendance. They were told to live in Memot District where Hun Sen was stationed on the border with Vietnam while Rany was assigned to work long hours in neighbouring Ponhea Kraek and Tboung Khmum districts. On 10 November 1976, Bun Rany gave birth to their first child in Memot, a son whom they named Kamsot (meaning "sad") who died later the same day as a result of being dropped by a Khmer Rouge nurse, Rany claims.

Hun Sen and Rany have six children, four sons (one of them deceased) and two daughters. Their names are Kamsot (deceased), Manet, Mana, Manith, Mani and Mali. The couple also adopted a daughter (who is not named in news media sources) in 1988, but they legally disowned her in 2007 for being lesbian.

== Activities as First Lady ==
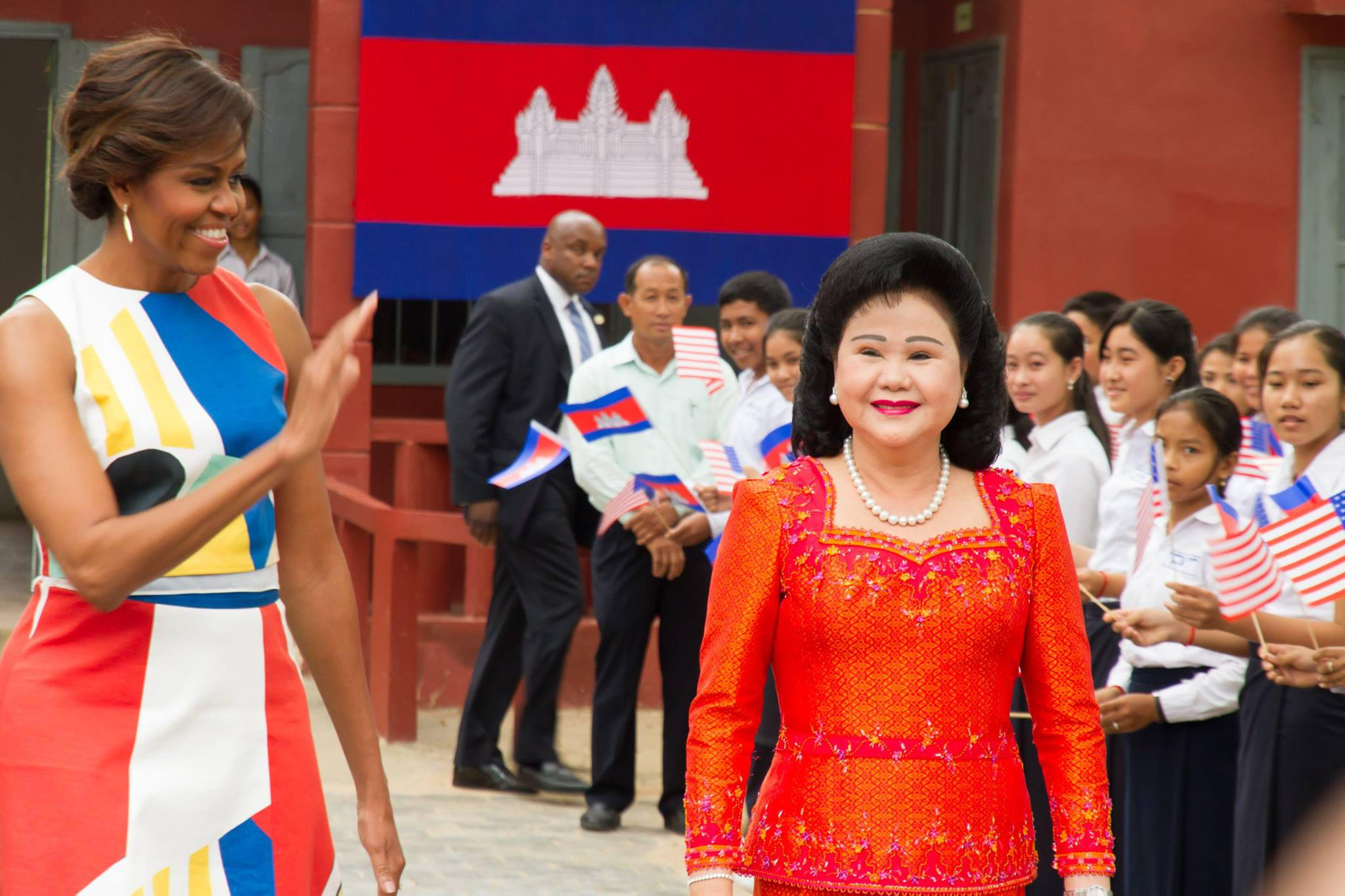
Bun Rany accompanies First Lady of the United States Michelle Obama during a visit to Siem Reap Province on 21 March 2015.

In 1977, the Khmer Rouge began internal purges directed at those suspected of disloyalty. Hun Sen, who had risen to the rank of Battalion Commander, became paranoid and fled with his followers into Vietnam where they joined a rebel army and replacement government organized by the Vietnamese in advance of its effort to overthrow the Khmer Rouge regime. Bun Rany, who was left behind, was imprisoned by the Khmer Rouge and would not see her husband again until almost two years later when the Vietnamese invaded Cambodia in 1979. Upon defeating the Khmer Rouge and occupying Cambodia, the Vietnamese named Hun Sen as deputy prime minister and freed Bun Rany who then began organizing orphanages and schools for the orphans left behind by the genocidal policies of the Khmer Rouge. In 1985, Hun Sen was appointed prime minister, giving Bun Rany a better platform to expand both her economic activities and her humanitarian work. During the post-1988 process of Thai-Cambodian rapprochement, she forged a close personal relationship with the wife of Thai Prime Minister Chatichai Choonhavan, and became deeply involved in the rapidly growing legal and illegal trade between Cambodia and Thailand. From her position as first lady, she began to call attention to the plight of those infected with HIV/AIDS, the poor and women's issues. In April 1994 at the first congress of the Cambodian Red Cross, she was elected as its Vice President while Princess Eng Marie, wife of then Co-Prime Minister Prince Norodom Ranariddh was elected president. At its second congress in 1998, Bun Rany was elected president after Hun Sen consolidated his power by violently ousting and exiling Ranariddh.

Some of the highlights of her tenure thus far have been the establishment of five development centers located throughout Cambodia aimed at providing vocational and business training to women and the poor, organizing and delivering aid to victims of floods that regularly inundate Cambodia (2000, 2011 and 2013, among others) and efforts supporting the UN Secretary-General's Action Plan for Women and Children's Health.

== Criticism and controversy ==
As the former communist wife of a leader who is widely considered a despotic dictator, Bun Rany is not without detractors. For instance, in 2003 Noranarith Anandayath, adviser to Prince Ranariddh, accused her of politicizing the Red Cross, a worldwide organization whose reputation is founded on its political neutrality, by funneling money from her husband's Cambodian People's Party (CPP) to villagers during an election when parties were prohibited from "making gifts" to voters.

In October 2013 critics including Prince Sisowath Thomico and Sam Rainsy accused her of abusing her position when, at a Cambodian Red Cross flood relief event in Pailin, she spent the majority of her speech denouncing the opposition Cambodia National Rescue Party (CNRP) in the wake of a controversial national election that spawned some of the biggest protests Cambodia has seen in decades.

In October 1999, following the public assassination of popular Cambodian actress Pisith Pilika, the French magazine L’Express claimed that the actress’ diary recounted a love affair with Hun Sen and named Bun Rany as the mastermind behind the shooting; the magazine also claimed that on her deathbed the actress had named Bun Rany to several people. Bun Rany quickly denied these charges, and announced that she would press charges against L’Express for defamation. However, no charges were ever brought against L'Express.

== Special interest groups ==
Cambodia, officially a multiparty democracy, in reality "remains a one-party state dominated by the Cambodian People's Party and Prime Minister Hun Sen, Bun's husband, a former Khmer Rouge official in power since 1985. The open doors to new investment during his reign have yielded the most access to a coterie of cronies of his and his wife, Bun Rany".

== Awards and honours ==
The following is a list of awards and honours accumulated by Lok Chumtiew Bun Rany.

- November 2006 – Joint UN Program on HIV/AIDS and the Asia Pacific Leadership Forum (APLF) recognise Bun Rany as an APLF Outstanding Champion
- October 2008 – Honorary Doctorate in Humanity from the University of Cambodia
- June 2009 – Honorary Doctorate in Economic Science from the Women's University of Seoul
- July 2010 – Honorary Doctorate in Literature from the Jeon Ju University of South Korea
- April 2010 – Honorary Doctorate in Education from Silla University, Busan, South Korea
- March 2011 – Granted title Kittiprittbandit of the Royal Academy of Cambodia by King Sihamoni
