= Norodom Marie =

Cambodian princess (born 1948)

Norodom Marie Ranariddh
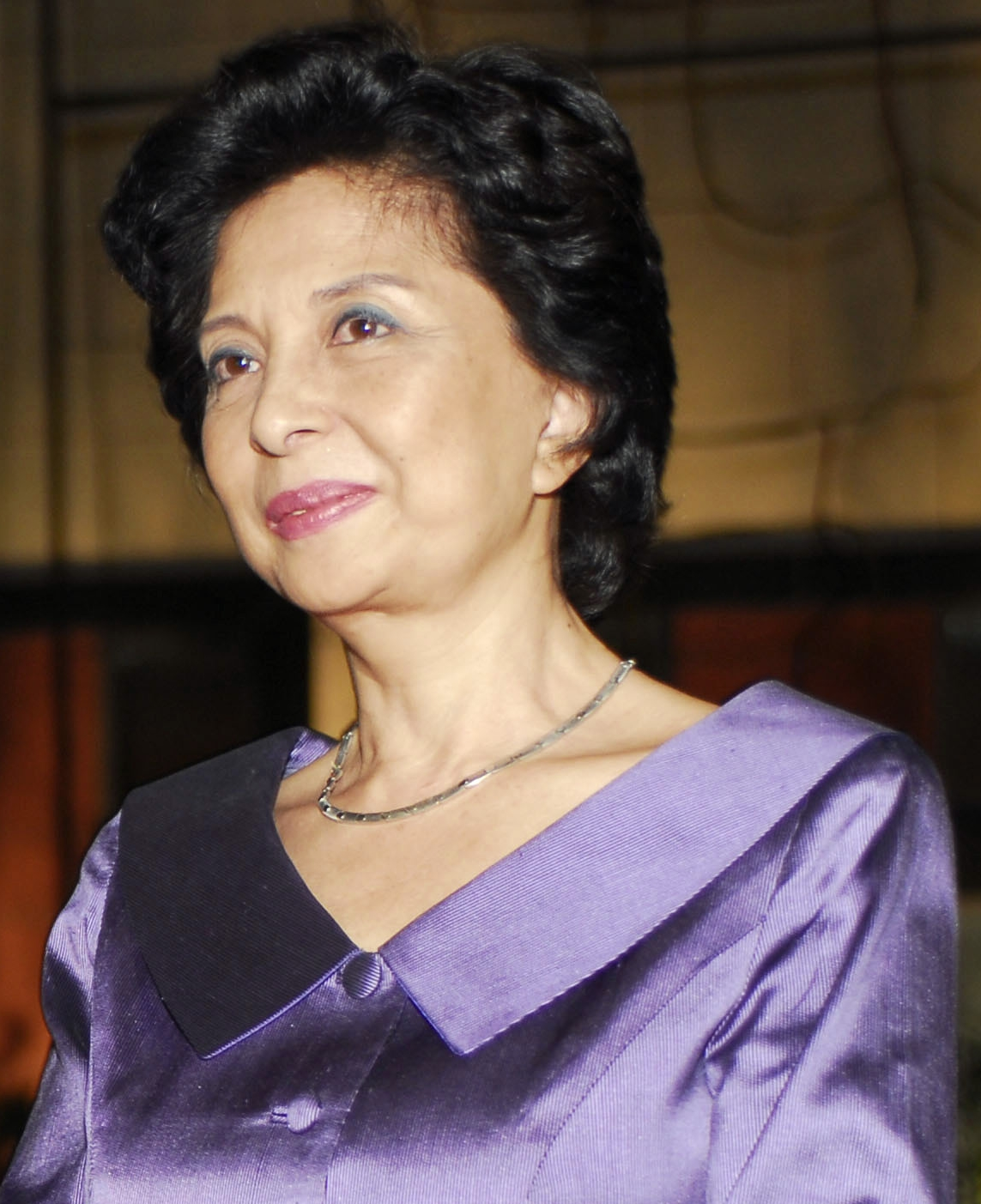
- Marie in 2007

Spouse of the Prime Minister of Cambodia
- In role 24 September 1993 – 6 August 1997; Alongside Bun Rany
- Prime Minister: Norodom Ranariddh First PM; Hun Sen Second PM
- Preceded by: Herself
- Succeeded by: Ung Malis Yvonne
- In role 2 July 1993 – 24 September 1993
- Prime Minister: Norodom Ranariddh
- Preceded by: Bun Rany
- Succeeded by: Herself

President of the Cambodian Red Cross
- In office 1994 – 30 April 1998
- Succeeded by: Bun Rany

Personal details
- Born: Eng Marie; 21 December 1948 (age 77)
- Spouse(s): Norodom Ranariddh (m. 1968; div. 2010)
- Children: Norodom Chakravuth; Norodom Sihariddh; Norodom Rattana Devi
- Parents: Eng Meas (father); Sarah Hay (mother)
- House: Norodom (by marriage; 1968–2010)

Princess Norodom Marie Ranariddh (Khmer: នរោត្តម ម៉ារី រណឫទ្ធិ; née Eng (Khmer: អេង); born 21 December 1948) is the first wife of Prince Norodom Ranariddh, Prime Minister of Cambodia from 1993 to 1997. She was President of the Cambodian Red Cross from 1994 to 1998.

== Personal life ==
From 1968 to 2010, Marie was married to Norodom Ranariddh, the prince and richest man in Cambodia. She describes herself as half Cham and Khmer Buddhist.
