= Community of Royalist People's Party =

Community of Royalist People's Party គណបក្សសង្គមរាស្រ្តរាជាធិបតេយ្យ
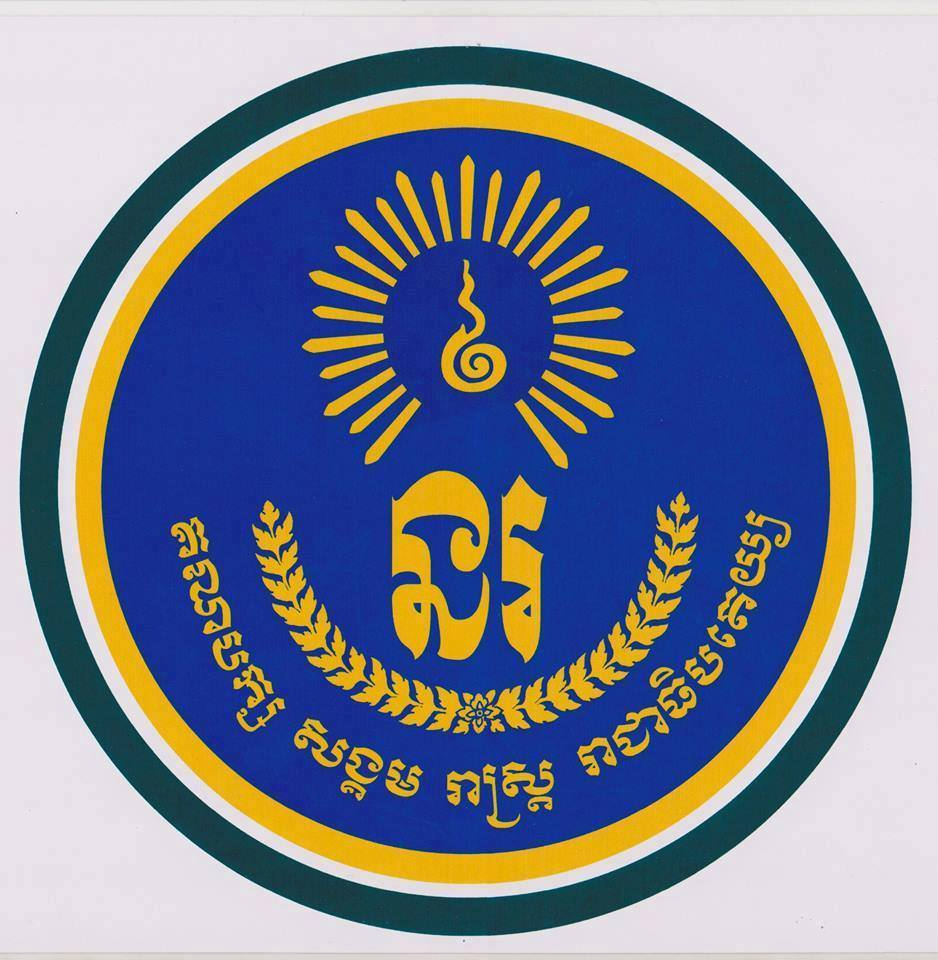
- Abbreviation: CRPP
- Leader: Norodom Ranariddh
- Founded: 16 March 2014
- Dissolved: 17 January 2015
- Merged into: FUNCINPEC
- Ideology: Khmer nationalism Conservatism; National conservatism Royalism
- Political position: Centre-right

The Community of Royalist People's Party (Khmer: គណបក្សសង្គមរាស្រ្តរាជាធិបតេយ្យ; CRPP) was a Cambodian political party that lasted from March 2014 until January 2015. It was founded and led by Norodom Ranariddh, who had been ousted from FUNCINPEC back in 2006. Ideologically a royalist party, the CRPP drew its inspiration from the political legacy of the former King of Cambodia, Norodom Sihanouk, and competed for its voter base with both FUNCINPEC and the Cambodia National Rescue Party (CNRP). In January 2015, the CRPP was dissolved when Ranariddh returned to FUNCINPEC.

== History ==
On 25 February 2014, former First Prime Minister of Cambodia Norodom Ranariddh, who was ousted from FUNCINPEC in 2006, announced plans to return to politics and lead the formation the Community of Royalist People's Party. The Cambodian Interior Ministry reportedly received a request from the party to be formally registered as a political party. In March 2014, Ranariddh hosted the party's official launching ceremony at the Phnom Penh Sunway Hotel, where he revealed the party logo and signed registration papers for the party. In April 2014, the CRPP's registration was officially approved by the Interior Ministry. A month later, CRPP appointed a new chief-of-cabinet Nop Sothearith, and the party also made an in-advance registration with the Interior Ministry to run for general elections scheduled to be held in 2018. In June 2014, the CRPP held a party to mark its official launch, and opened its headquarters at the Russey Keo District in Phnom Penh.

In October 2014, a public spate arose between Ranariddh and his personal secretary, Noranarith Anandayath. Ranariddh accused Noranarith of badmouthing him, which prompted the latter to resign from the CRPP. Two months later, in December 2014, the Phnom Penh Post reported that several high-ranking FUNCINPEC officials defected to the CRPP, which included a former secretary of state, former provincial governor and former deputy national police chief. On 2 January 2015, Ranariddh announced his plan to return to FUNCINPEC, after being ousted from the party in 2006. The announcement was made after a private meeting with Prime Minister Hun Sen who had urged Ranariddh to rejoin his former party. The CRPP was subsequently dissolved when Ranariddh returned to FUNCINPEC later in the latter part of January 2015.

== Ideology and political positions ==
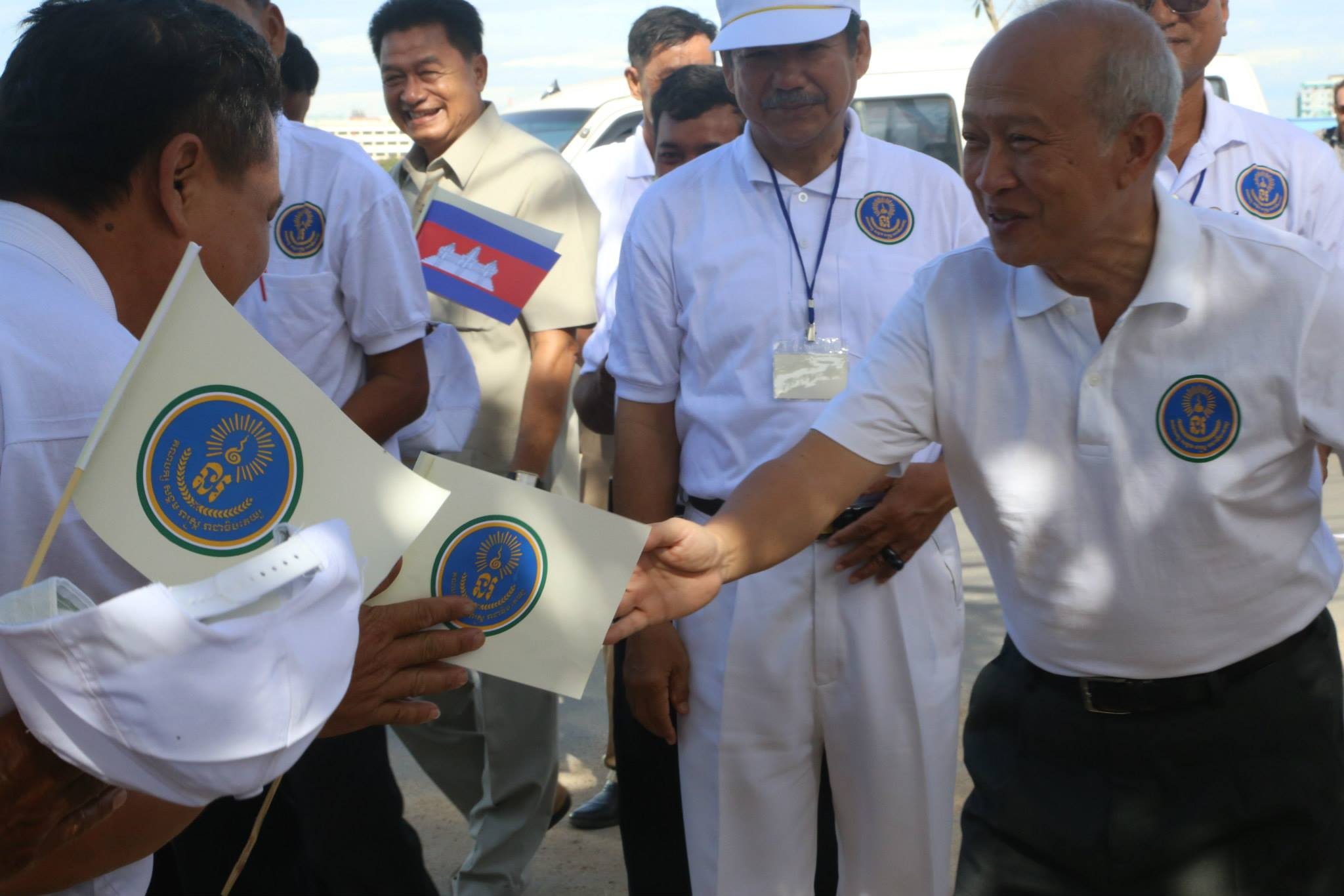
Ranariddh handing out party flags to CRPP supporters in June 2014.

The CRPP was a royalist party, and Ranariddh stated in February 2015 that the party aligns itself to the political legacy of Norodom Sihanouk. The CRPP also stated that it directly competed for the voter base from the CNRP and FUNCINPEC, but not with the Cambodian People's Party (CPP). At the party's launching ceremony in March 2014, Ranariddh added that the CRPP would not seek to align itself with the CPP or CNRP. Ranariddh also expressed interest to resolve socioeconomic problems such as poverty, low wages and corruption, which he claimed were worsened by the effects of the political protests as a result of political differences between the CPP and CNRP. In June 2014, Ranariddh outlined several reform proposals at a party meeting for youths, such as reviewing 99-year land leases to identify illegal land concessions and helping more youths to seek employment locally.

The CRPP maintained frosty relations with FUNCINPEC, which had earlier ousted Ranariddh as its president in 2006. When Ranariddh announced plans to form the party in February 2014, several FUNCINPEC leaders including Nhek Bun Chhay, Keo Puth Rasmey and Sisowath Sirirath questioned Ranariddh's leadership abilities and past political track record. Ranariddh was particularly critical of the CNRP and in March 2014, he denied accusations by CNRP leader Sam Rainsy that the CRPP was formed with the aim of splitting the opposition voter base. Ranariddh also charged that the Rainsy would end Cambodia's status as a constitutional monarchy if they were elected to power. In May 2014, Ranariddh called on the CPP and CNRP to form a unity government and proposed that the CRPP was keen to act as a mediator between the two parties.

== Logo ==
The CRPP's party logo had a circular design, and bears Ranariddh's initials in the Khmer language. The logo also includes the number "9", which represents power according to brahmin tradition. Around the logo were three circles; one was yellow, representing the monarchy, another was white, representing peace, and the third was green, representing water. On Ranariddh's return to the party in January 2015, FUNCINPEC adopted a new logo that was inspired by that of the defunct CRPP's party logo.
