= Pich Chanmony =

Wife of Hun Manet (born 1980)

- ពេជ ចន្ទមុន្នី
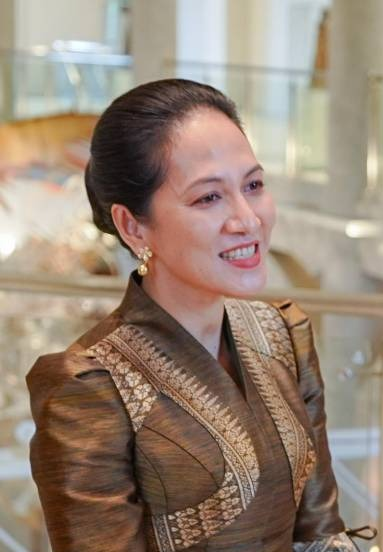
- Pich in 2025

Spouse of the Prime Minister of Cambodia
- Assumed role 22 August 2023
- Prime Minister: Hun Manet
- Preceded by: Bun Rany

Vice President of the Cambodian Red Cross
- Incumbent
- Assumed office 15 December 2023
- President: Bun Rany

Personal details
- Born: 22 January 1980 (age 46) Phnom Penh, People's Republic of Kampuchea
- Party: Cambodian People's Party
- Spouse: Hun Manet (m. 2006)
- Children: 3
- Education: University of Health Sciences (BS); Boston University (MPH); London School of Hygiene and Tropical Medicine (DrPH)
- Website: Dr. Pich Chanmony

Pich Chanmony (Khmer: ពេជ ចន្ទមុន្នី; born 22 January 1980) is a Cambodian pharmacist, public health worker, and businesswoman, who is currently in role of the First Lady of Cambodia also known as the spouse of prime minister Hun Manet. She is also vice president of the Cambodian Red Cross, which is currently headed by her mother-in-law Bun Rany.

== Early life and education ==
Pich Chanmony is the daughter of Pich Sophoan, Secretary of State of the Ministry of Labor. Her brother, Pich Aphirak, is married to Lau Sok Huy, who is a member of the family that controls Pheapimex, a vast conglomerate with interests in various sectors across Cambodia. She graduated with a Bachelor's Degree in Pharmacy from the University of Health Sciences, Cambodia, in 2002, a Master of Public Health from Boston University in 2003, and a Doctorate in Public Health from the London School of Hygiene & Tropical Medicine in 2013.

== Business ==
Pich Chanmony is involved in the Hun family's extensive business empire, which has accumulated a "vast fortune" with interests in at least 114 domestic companies across key sectors in Cambodia. She is connected to eight companies, notably serving as chairperson of Legend Cinema and G Gear, the exclusive distributor of LG products. According to The Post, Hun Sen has exploited his position as Prime Minister to enable his relatives to gain control over, or significant stakes in, most of the country's major industries.

== Humanitarian ==
She is known for her humanitarian and social service activities in Cambodia. She holds key positions in several organizations, including vice chairman of the Samdech Techo Voluntary Youth Doctor Association (TYDA), chairwoman of Smile Cambodia, member of the Board of Governors of Operation Smile Cambodia, and chief commissioner of the Girl Guides Association of Cambodia (GGAC). Additionally, she is a member of the Advisory Committee of the A&H Fujimoto Foundation.

During the COVID-19 pandemic in Cambodia, she played a significant role as she led the Study and Research for Medicines and Medical Supplies in the Combating COVID-19 Working Group. She successfully led the group in securing Cambodia's bid to host the 39th International Women's Scout Conference, scheduled for 2026.

For the past decade, she has been advocating for clean water supply and sanitation standards across Cambodia. She has facilitated the construction of numerous wells for villagers, particularly in remote areas, significantly enhancing their daily lives. She led a team of doctors and health volunteers to provide services to nearly 4,000 people, with 105 individuals subsequently admitted for further treatment under her sponsorship using personal funds. She also serves as the honorary president of the National Committee for the Promotion of Social Morality, Women, and Khmer Family Values, addressing concerns about the increasing incidence of physical and sexual violence against women in society.

In February 2024, she was awarded the highest honorary title, "Abhiseribovor Puthasasanobakara Tharachoutika", by both the Sangha Council of Cambodia and the Board of Paññāsāstra University of Cambodia. The honor was conferred upon Pich Chanmony in recognition of her dedication to upholding noble virtues and advancing the profound benefits of Buddhism and society.

On May 31, 2024, as the honorary president of the Kantha Bopha Foundation, she launched the "10,000 Riel 10,000" Campaign, which received donations from 38,170 people, totaling 657,777,034 riels and 96,212 US dollars.

== As Spouse of Prime Minister ==
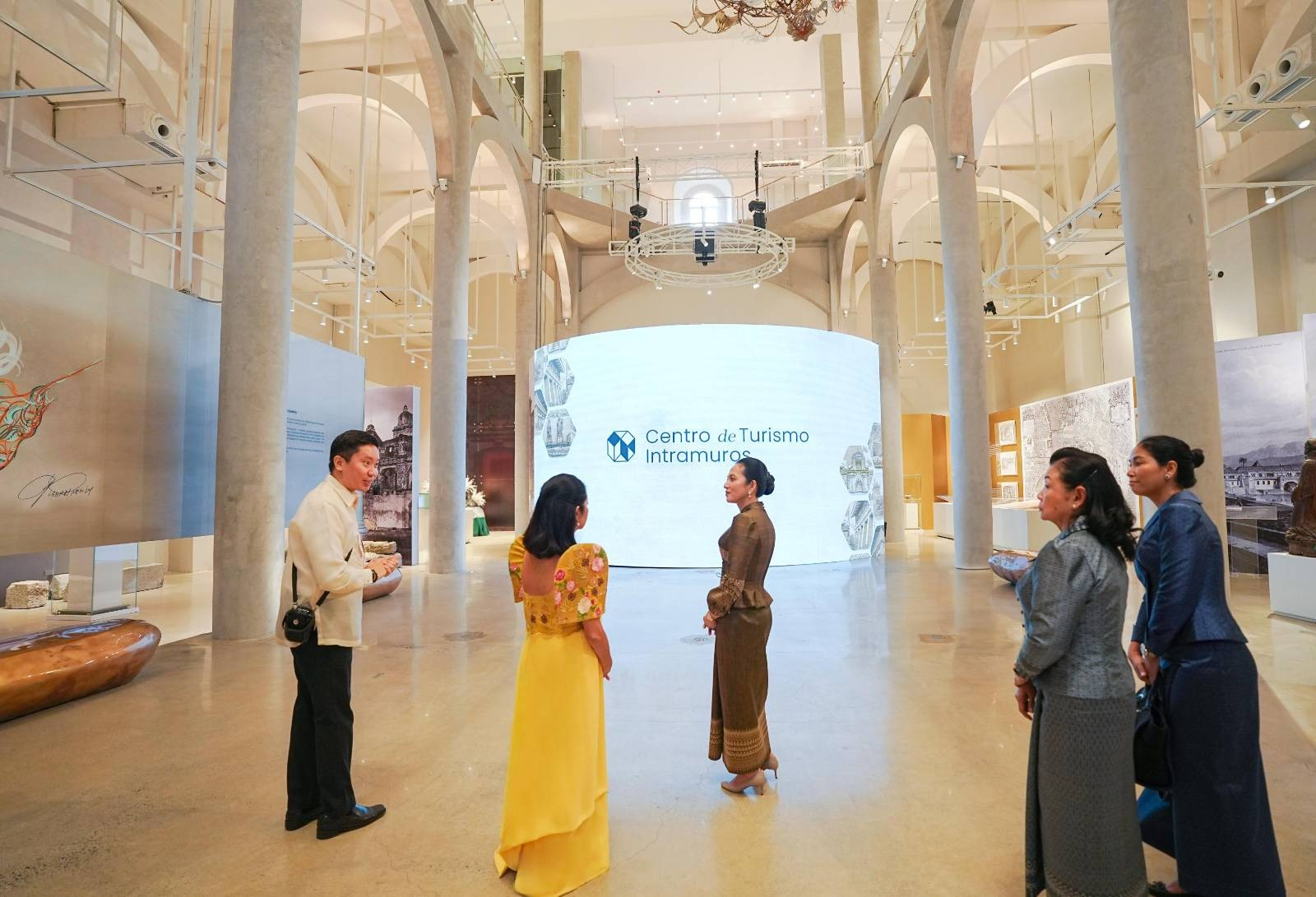
Pich Chanmony (center) with Philippine First Lady Liza Araneta Marcos (center-left) in Manila, February 2025

Pich Chanmony came into limelight when her husband Hun Manet became prime minister, following the resignation of his father Hun Sen on 22 August 2023. As PM's spouse, she accompanied her husband on an official state visit to Thailand at the invitation of Srettha Thavisin, the Prime Minister of Thailand, in February 2024. This marked their first official state visit. During the visit, they had a royal audience with King Maha Vajiralongkorn and Queen Suthida.

In early September, she also accompanied Hun Manet to the ASEAN Summit for their debut on the international stage and the ASEAN-Australia Special Summit in 2024. She also accompanied Hun Manet on his official visits to the Third Belt and Road Forum for International Cooperation in China from October 16 to 19. During the visit, Pich Chanmony was welcomed by China's first lady Peng Liyuan, the wife of Chinese leader Xi Jinping.

On 27 October 2025, she participated in the "Spouses' Programme" at the 47th ASEAN Summit in Kuala Lumpur as the spouse of the Prime Minister of Cambodia.

=== Controversies ===
The Cambodia Daily reported on May 2 that Pich Chanmony allegedly received a bribe from Kun Nhem, the director-general of the General Department of Customs and Excise (GDCE) and a minister delegate attached to the Prime Minister, to extend his retirement from 2025 to 2028. Prime Minister Hun Manet and Senate President Hun Sen criticized the media for this report. Hun Sen described it as a "stupid act" aimed at slandering his daughter-in-law, while Hun Manet denounced it as fabricated information intended to defame and harm his family's reputation and dignity.

== Personal life ==
Pich Chanmony married Hun Manet in 2006, and they have two daughters and one son. While she is assumed to be involved in the official promotions of her husband, Hun Manet told journalists that his wife never interferes in his work, not even in minor matters.
