= Norodom Chakravuth =

Cambodian politician

His Royal Highness Norodom Chakravuth
- នរោត្តម ចក្រាវុធ
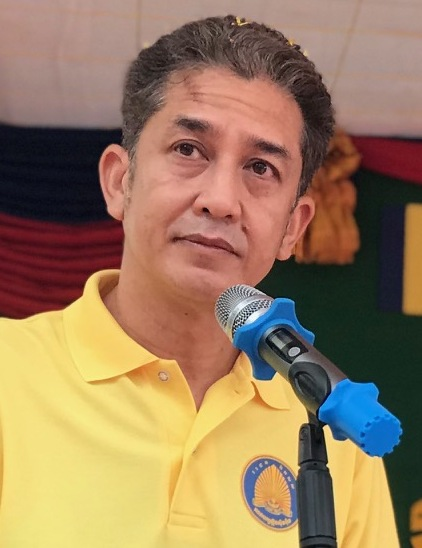
- Prince Chakravuth in 2023

President of FUNCINPEC
- Incumbent
- Assumed office 8 February 2022
- Vice President: Norodom Rattana Devi
- Preceded by: Norodom Ranariddh

Member of the National Assembly
- Incumbent
- Assumed office 21 August 2023
- Constituency: Phnom Penh

Personal details
- Born: 13 January 1970 (age 56) Phnom Penh, Cambodia
- Party: FUNCINPEC
- Parents: Norodom Ranariddh; Eng Marie
- House: Norodom

Norodom Chakravuth (Khmer: នរោត្តម ចក្រាវុធ [nɔroːɗɑm cakraːʋut]; born 13 January 1970) is a Cambodian politician, member of the Cambodian royal family and the current president of the FUNCINPEC.

== Name ==
Norodom Chakravuth is a descendant of the Norodom branch of the Cambodian monarchy. His name Chakravuth literally translates from Sanskrit as the one who has the chakra as a weapon, and refers to the Chakravarti, an ancient Indian term used to refer to an ideal universal ruler.

== Biography ==
=== From royal to exile ===
Norodom Chakravuth was born 13 January 1970, as the first-born of Prince Norodom Ranariddh and Eng Marie.

When Lon Nol staged a successful coup against Sihanouk in March 1970, his father Ranariddh was dismissed from his position in government, sent his family to France and fled into the jungle where he was a close associate of resistance leaders.

In 1973, Chakravuth was reunited with his father Ranariddh who sought asylum in France and studied law at the University of Provence, before also teaching there.

Chakravuth lived with his family in Aix-en-Provence until moving to Paris to further his studies. After graduating in computer science in Paris, Chakravuth set up his own business in Cambodia in 1994, where he started dating a French doctor at the Institut Pasteur.

=== Returning to the Kingdom of Cambodia in 1994 ===
As a high-ranking member of the royal family of Cambodia, Prince Chakravuth regularly participated in official events of the Royal Palace such as the Royal Ploughing Ceremony.

On 11 August 2018, the Funcinpec Party appointed Prince Norodom Chakravuth as its acting president when Prince Norodom Ranariddh, the party's head since 1992, was out of the country. Prince Ranariddh himself hand-picked his oldest son to take over the party in his absence, as his health dwindled. Quickly after being appointed, Chakravuth removed three senior party officials from their positions, among which You Hockry, displaying a conflict in the inner workings of the Funcinpec party.

Since taking over the acting presidency of his party, Prince Chakravuth has been confronted with narrowing popular support and financial difficulties, which have led to bitter discussions and controversial sale of party property.

=== Leader of the royalist party since 2022 ===
From 6 to 8 December 2021, Prince Chakravuth conducted the royal funeral of his father in front of Wat Botum, under the auspices of the Queen Mother Monique of Cambodia and the reigning king Sihamoni; as Khmer tradition prescribes, after the body of the deceased was cremated, Prince Chakravuth picked up from the ashes the gold coin which had been placed in the mouth of the deceased.

In 2022, three months after the FUNCINPEC president, Samdech Krom Preah Norodom Ranariddh, died on 28 November 2021, Cambodian Minister of the Interior Sar Kheng encouraged the FUNCINPEC to elect a new leader in late January 2022. Against supporters of his aunt Princess Norodom Arunrasmy who had already been president of Funcinpec between 2013 and 2015 and had not left behind her an imperishable memory, Prince Norodom Chakravuth was elected unanimously by the FUNCINPEC Congress to be the party president on 9 February 2022. Chakravuth has been able to build a strong coalition winning the support of elderly advisers and long-time gone members of his party. After being critical at first, to the point of being excluded of the party and of their government positions, senior members finally showed Prince Chakravuth their full endorsement:

[Prince Chakravuth] is the only qualified successor to Prince Ranariddh because he is both an intellectual and an outstanding young man. Within Cambodian society, leaders at all levels understand clearly that he is the only suitable candidate.

— Heng Chantha, senior member of the FUNCINPEC

Since the Cambodian National Rescue Party, the country’s main opposition party, was dissolved in 2017 by the Supreme Court of Cambodia, the FUNCINPEC of Chakravuth has a chance of becoming a major player once again in Khmer politics as Cambodia will hold the commune election in June 2022 and the general election in 2023.

I am going to reunite the former royalists, Sihanoukists and Ranariddhists, so that the party can return to its former levels of success.

— Prince Norodom Chakravuth, Investiture speech on February 9, 2022

Party political offices
Vacant Title last held by Norodom Ranariddh	President of FUNCINPEC; 2022–present	Incumbent
