= Norodom Rattana Devi =

Cambodian princess

Norodom Rattana Devi នរោត្តម រតនាទេវី
- Princess of Cambodia
- Princess Norodom Rattana Devi in 2018

Vice President of the FUNCINPEC
- In office: 4 July 2022 – present
- President: Norodom Chakravuth

Member of Parliament for Kratié
- In office: 4 October 2003 – 27 July 2008
- Born: 18 June 1974 (age 52); Aix-en-Provence, France
- House: Norodom
- Father: Norodom Ranariddh
- Mother: Eng Marie
- Citizenship: Cambodia; France
- Education: University of Provence
- Political party: FUNCINPEC

Styles of Norodom Rattana Devi
- Reference style: Her Royal Highness
- Spoken style: Your Royal Highness

Norodom Rattana Devi (Khmer: នរោត្តម រតនាទេវី, born 18 June 1974) is a Cambodian princess, politician and only daughter of Prince Norodom Ranariddh and Princess Norodom Marie. She belongs to FUNCINPEC and was elected to represent Kratie Province in the National Assembly of Cambodia in 2003. She shares her birthday with Queen Mother Norodom Monineath.
