= Voan Savay =

Khmer ballet dancer

- Born: វ័ន សាវ៉ៃ 1950 (age 75–76); Phnom Penh
- Citizenship: Kingdom of Cambodia
- Years active: since 1962
- Spouse: Van Roeun
- Career
- Current group: Mek Theang dance troupe
- Dances: Royal Ballet of Cambodia

Voan Savay is a Cambodian dancer and director of performing arts, considered as "the last Apsara of Cambodia" and a "legendary former prima ballerina of the Cambodian Royal Ballet".

== Biography ==
=== A child prodigy of the Khmer Royal Ballet ===
Voan Savay was born in 1950. As a child, she was introduced to the Khmer Royal Ballet at the Royal Palace. At age 12, she started travelling across Cambodia with the Khmer Royal Ballet for performances. In 1965, at the age of 15, she was crowned the prima ballerina or principal dancer, where she punctually replaced princess Bopha Devi, a position she held until 1970 when the royal family collapsed.

In 1965, she joined the first trip to China with Khmer Royal Ballet. In 1971, Voan Savay was the star Apsara dancer with the Khmer Royal Ballet troupe when they went on tour to the United States.

=== A survivor in hiding during the terror of the Khmers Rouges ===
During the terrible years of the Khmer Rouge regime, Voan Savay kept her background a secret and hid her identity in order to survive.

=== Fleeing Kampuchea to dance in the camps ===
Following the fall of the regime in 1979, Voan moved back to Phnom Penh and married another dancer, Van Roeun, a folk dancer, who was a graduate of the Royal University of Fine Arts. Though she managed to perform for the Communist government, her life was still miserable and in 1981, she and her husband decided to leave Cambodia and headed towards a refugee camp on the Thai border where she set up a dance school in the Cultural center of Site Two Refugee Camp with the help of the United Nations Border Relief Operation and Catholic Office for Emergency Relief and Refugees as the artists lacked costumes, musical instruments and equipment required for the performances. There, Voan Savay managed to find more than 100 dancers, and reunited with a former palace musician, Proeung Pruon, who had accompanied her when she danced in the 1960s and early 1970s. He and other accomplished artists formed a pin peat ensemble in Ampil sub-camp of Site 2, specifically for the classical dances. Savay started to document the dance. She began to notate, in narrative form, gestures and movements for particular characters in the classical repertoire. Before the war and revolution, no such documentation had been undertaken in Cambodia.

=== Returning to democracy and to Cambodia ===
In 1991, after almost a decade in the camps, Voan and her young dancers were invited to the United States of America to carry out a three-month tour, during which she helped set up the Khmer Royal Ballet in California. As democracy returned to Cambodia, she settled back in Phnom Penh, but after the 1997 coup, she fled the country once more to find asylum in France, where she and her husband lived for two decades teaching Cambodian traditional dance.

=== Finding asylum in France ===
During her asylum in France, Voan Savay helped various Cambodian associations in the Paris region as well as in Montreal, including Selepak-Khmer, and Cabaret des Oiseaux.

She also contributed to the restoration of the BCK Association, Ballet Classique Khmer de Paris, along with Prince Tesso Sisowath and Princess Vichara Norodom.

=== Returning to Cambodia for the sake of art ===
After two decades in France, Voan Savay re-established herself in Phnom Penh in 2016 at the invitation of Princess Buphadevi and Prince Tesso Sissowath who were eager to transmit the heritage of the last living apsara of Cambodia. She became an artistic director at the Center of Cambodian Living Arts (ECLA) with director Jean-Baptiste Phou.

In 2018, Voan Savay organized a collaboration with students from France's 'Conservatoire de danse de Bagnolet and her own Children of Bassac, all aged 12 to 17, featuring a mix of Western classical and contemporary ballet, as well as Cambodian folk and classical dance. It was titled De l'Ombre à la Lumière – "From shadow to light" with as a finale an original choreography by Edith Bellomo, professor at the Conservatory.

On top of teaching, she continues to play an active role in the Khmer Ballet in which she still performed in 2018 at age 68, with an unfading enthusiasm and energy.

== Legacy ==
=== Renewing the traditional kbach of Khmer ballet ===
Voan Savay is trying to rebuild Cambodia's traditional dance to what it was in its heyday. She says there were 4,500 moves or kbach originally, however, only 1,000 have survived the test of time.

To that end, Voan Savay has trained and inspired a whole new generation of Khmer ballerinas, such as Sam Sathya.

=== Dance as therapy ===
Voan Savay relied on the transmission of the Royal Khmer Ballet in the camps to protect the human dignity and rights of the refugees, so they could continue to live through their national heritage and pride. Voan Savay believes art can be a form of therapy. Accordingly, in order to help heal the trauma and PTSD from the years of war and misery in Cambodia, the swift motions and dexterous articulations of the Khmer royal ballet can help heal a certain form of mental paralysis. This healing through dance can also apply to the audience:

"[The audience] can forget about the sorrow of the moment, and bring themselves into our ancient times, converge themselves with this state, and find a measure of peace for their feelings. They can come to understand that now, this is what this modern time is, but their true spirit as it was before is actually like that."[21]

=== Evolution of the Khmer Royal Ballet ===
Beyond restoring the Khmer Royal Ballet, Voan Savay also acknowledges and encourages a certain evolution. As such, the dance has gone from a sacred rite to a more personal expression of a psychological drama. This is seen in the evolution from the theatrical whiteface covering up any facial emotion of the dancers under King Sisowath of Cambodia to a more expressive form of dancing which be manifested either through pain or joyful smiles nowadays.

== Bibliography ==
- Shapiro-Phim, Toni (2021-12-03). "A Cambodian Dancer in a Displaced Persons' Camp". Music & Minorities. 1 (1). doi:10.52411/mm.2021.3. S2CID 244930394.
- May, Sharon (2018). Dancing in Site II: Life and Art in Cambodian Refugee Camps After the War. Tonsai Editions. ISBN 978-9924-9284-0-9.
- Cravath, Paul (2007). Earth in Flower: The Divine Mystery of the Cambodian Dance Drama. DatAsia. ISBN 978-1-934431-28-3.
