= Norodom Ranariddh Party =

Norodom Ranariddh Party គណបក្ស នរោត្ដម រណឫទ្ធិ
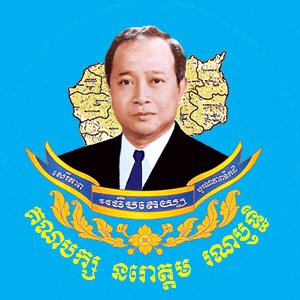
- Abbreviation: NRP
- Leader: Sao Rany
- Founder: Norodom Ranariddh
- Founded: 16 November 2006
- Dissolved: 7 April 2014
- Split from: FUNCINPEC
- Merged into: Cambodia National Rescue Party
- Ideology: Khmer nationalism Conservatism; Monarchism
- Political position: Centre-right
- Religion: Theravada Buddhism
- Slogan: "សេរីភាព អធិបតេយ្យ បុរណភាពទឹកដី" (English: "Freedom, Sovereignty, Territorial Integrity")

Website
- norodomranariddhparty.org

The Norodom Ranariddh Party (NRP; Khmer: គណបក្ស នរោត្ដម រណឫទ្ធិ) was a Cambodian political party created by Prince Norodom Ranariddh, who left the royalist FUNCINPEC party of which he was previously President.

A congress of people chose to change the name of their political party called Khmer National Front Party to the Norodom Ranariddh Party on 16 November 2006 and elected Prince Norodom Ranariddh as the president of NRP.

It was briefly known as the Nationalist Party from 2008 to 2010.

== Political ideology ==
The party promotes several ideologies. On the conservative side, it promotes the preservation of Cambodia's "cultural landmarks" while improving the capital city "Phnom Penh's master plan" to mend "buildings in the city in order to" be an excellent "modern city." The party also wants to keep the existence of the "Khmer race and its culture, religion and language." The NRP wants to nationally stop the "increase in the price of goods" and will get rid of "the monopoly on foreign good imports" and take away "tariffs on" the necessary foods Cambodia gets from other countries.

On the progressive side, it believes in making the "minimum wages for factory workers" larger. The NRP would oppose the "blocks of flats which have been constructed to poor technical standards" particularly those with no necessary emergency systems. A liberal part of this party's ideology is promoting freedom from the rulers of Cambodia who only think of "power, money and themselves" or a "dictatorial" and militaristic government. Apart from that, the party proposed reforming the "city's judicial systems", freeing it from any damaging misguidance so it can give its "independence and fairness for the people."

== Political activities ==
The Norodom Ranariddh Party created an alliance with three political parties: the Sam Rainsy Party, FUNCINPEC party and the Human Rights Party. Together they wanted the international community and Cambodia to oppose the Cambodian elections that were "won" on 27 July 2008 by the Cambodian People's Party because the CPP "manipulated and rigged" the elections.

Prince Norodom Ranariddh announced "retirement from politics" on Friday 3 October 2008. However he still will have influence on "NRP policy". While that's happening the party appointed Chhim Siek Leng "as its next [acting] leader."

Norodom Ranariddh entered politics again on 11 December 2010, when the NRP (which had been known as the Nationalist Party after Norodom Ranariddh left) renamed itself again.

== Election results ==
=== General election ===
Election	Leader	Votes			Seats		Position	Government
Election	Leader	#	%	±	#	±	Position	Government
2008	Sao Rany	337,943	5.6	New	2 / 123	New	▲4th	CPP–FUNCINPEC

=== Communal elections ===
Election	Leader	Votes			Communes		Councillors		Position
Election	Leader	#	%	±	#	±	#	±	Position
2007	Norodom Ranariddh	419,791	8.1	New	0 / 1,621	New	425 / 11,353	New	▲3rd
2012	Norodom Ranariddh	170,962	2.8	▼5.3	0 / 1,633	Steady	52 / 11,459	▼373	▼5th
