= Phat Kanhol =

Cambodian princess (1920–1970)

Phat Kanhol ផាត់ កាញ៉ុល
- Born: 1920
- Died: 1 February 1970 (aged 49–50); Phnom Penh, Cambodia
- Spouse: Norodom Sihanouk (m. 1942; div. 1946)
- Issue: Norodom Buppha Devi; Norodom Ranariddh
- House: Norodom (by marriage)

Phat Kanhol (Khmer: ផាត់ កាញ៉ុល; 1920 – 1 February 1970) was the first wife of Norodom Sihanouk, former King of Cambodia. She was the mother of Princess Norodom Buppha Devi (1943–2019) and Prince Norodom Ranariddh (1944–2021). She and King Sihanouk separated in 1946. She died on 1 February 1970. She is referred to as Lady Phat Kanhol (Khmer: អ្នកម្នាងផាត់កាញ៉ុល).
