= Mam Manivan Phanivong =

Cambodian princess (1924–1975)

Mam Manivan Phaninvong
- Born: Munivarni Barni Varman; 1924; Vientiane, Laos, French Indochina
- Died: 19 April 1975 (aged 50–51); Phnom Penh, Kampuchea
- Spouse: Norodom Sihanouk (m. 1949–1955)
- Issue: Princess Norodom Sujata; Princess Norodom Arunrasmy
- House: Norodom (by marriage)

Mam Manivan Phaninvong (1924 – 19 April 1975) was a Cambodian princess.

== Life ==
She was born in Vientiane, Laos. She married King Norodom Sihanouk of Cambodia in 1949 at Khemerin Palace, becoming his fourth wife. They had two daughters, Princess Norodom Sujata and the Royal Princess Norodom Arunrasmy.

During the Fall of Phnom Penh, she took refuge at the French Embassy. On 18 April, the Khmer Rouge ordered all Cambodians who had taken refuge in the French Embassy, other than women married to Frenchmen, to leave the embassy or they would take over the embassy, rejecting any right of asylum. Among those evicted was Princess Mam Manivan Phanivong, along with Minister of Finance Khy-Taing Lim and Minister of Health Loeung Nal.

She was murdered by the Khmer Rouge on 19 April 1975, after having been denied refuge in the French Embassy.
