= Norodom Arunrasmy =

Cambodian princess, politician and diplomat

Norodom Arunrasmy នរោត្តម អរុណរស្មី
- Princess of Cambodia
- Her Royal Highness Norodom Arunrasmy
- Born: 2 October 1955 (age 71); Phnom Penh, Cambodia
- Spouse: Sisowath Sirirath (m. 1970; div. 1991); Keo Puth Rasmey (m. 1991)
- Issue: Sisowath Nakia; Sisowath Nando; Sisowath Sirikith Nathalie; Norodom Reasmey Ponita; Norodom Reasmey Khemuni
- House: Norodom
- Father: Norodom Sihanouk
- Mother: Mam Manivan Phanivong
- Religion: Theravada Buddhism
- Occupation: Member of the Supreme Privy Council to His Majesty the King; Advisor to the Royal Government; Member of the Senate

Styles of Norodom Arunrasmy
- Reference style: Her Royal Highness
- Spoken style: Your Royal Highness

Norodom Arunrasmy (Khmer: នរោត្តម អរុណរស្មី; born 2 October 1955) is a Cambodian Princess, politician, and diplomat. She is the youngest daughter of King Father Norodom Sihanouk and stepdaughter of Queen Mother Norodom Monineath Sihanouk. Her birth mother is Mam Manivan Phanivong, a Lao woman who was born in Vientiane, Laos and married King Norodom Sihanouk in 1949. Her official title is Her Royal Highness Samdech Reach Botrei Norodom Arunrasmy Preah Anoch (Khmer: សម្តេចរាជបុត្រី នរោត្តម អរុណរស្មី ព្រះអនុជ).

== Life and career ==
Samdech Reach Botrei Preah Anoch Norodom Arunrasmy attended primary school at the Petit Lycée Descartes in Phnom Penh, Cambodia, and attended secondary school at the Dominican International School in Taipei, Taiwan. In the 1980s she began her professional career in banking in the US, working at the Bank of California in Long Beach, and later Siam Commercial Bank in New York. After the Paris Peace Accords, she became deputy director and then director of Cambodian Agricultural Bank from 1992 to 1997. Norodom Arunrasmy was also a member of the Cambodian Red Cross Committee and member of the ASEAN Women's Association (ASEAN Ladies Circle).

She was selected as the Funcinpec party candidate for the 2008 Cambodian parliamentary elections.

Norodom Arunrasmy was the Cambodian Ambassador to Malaysia from 2005 to 2018 before being nominated to the Senate by King Norodom Sihamoni. Samdech Reach Botrei Preah Anoch Norodom Arunrasmy currently serves as a Member of the Supreme Privy Council to His Majesty the King, an Advisor to the Royal Government, and a Member of the Senate. She is fluent in the Khmer, French, Lao, Thai and English languages.

== Family ==
Norodom Arunrasmy married Prince Sisowath Sirirath in 1970, with whom she had three children: Sisowath Nakia, Sisowath Nando, Sisowath Sirikith Nathalie. They divorced in 1991, and she then married Keo Puth Rasmey, with whom she had two children: Norodom Reasmey Ponita, Norodom Reasmey Khemuni.
