= Norodom Ranariddh =

Prime Minister of Cambodia from 1993 to 1997

His Royal Highness Samdech Krom Preah Norodom Ranariddh
- នរោត្ដម រណឫទ្ធិ
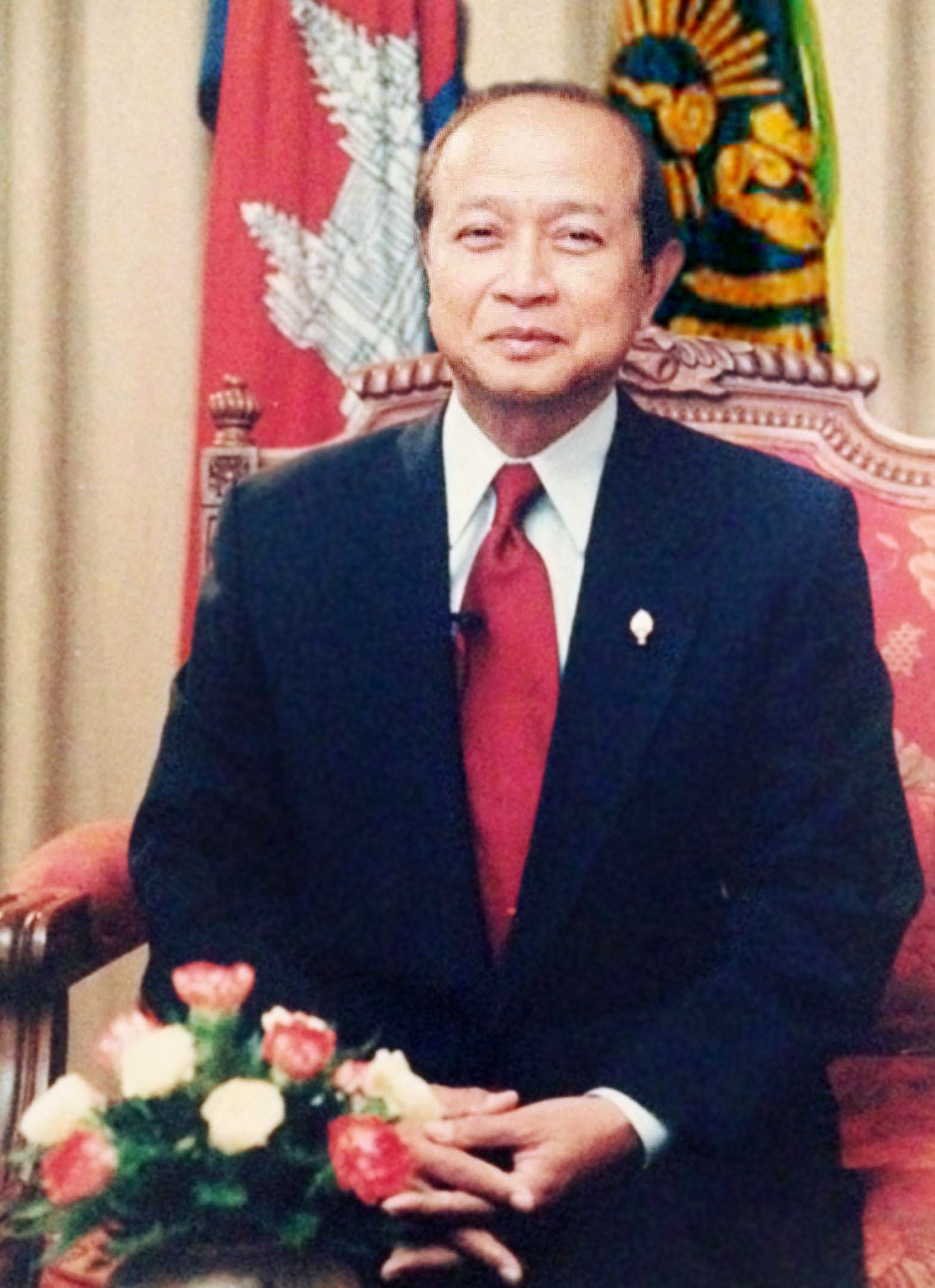
- Ranariddh in 2006

President of the National Assembly
- In office 25 November 1998 – 14 March 2006
- Monarchs: Norodom Sihanouk; Norodom Sihamoni
- Vice President: Heng Samrin; Nguon Nhel
- Preceded by: Chea Sim
- Succeeded by: Heng Samrin

First Prime Minister of Cambodia
- In office 24 September 1993 – 6 August 1997 Serving with Hun Sen (as Second Prime Minister)
- Monarch: Norodom Sihanouk
- Preceded by: Himself (as Prime Minister)
- Succeeded by: Ung Huot

Prime Minister of Cambodia
- In office 2 July 1993 – 24 September 1993
- President: Norodom Sihanouk
- Preceded by: Position restored
- Succeeded by: Himself (as First Prime Minister); Hun Sen (as Second Prime Minister)

President of FUNCINPEC
- In office 19 January 2015 – 28 November 2021
- Preceded by: Norodom Arunrasmy
- Succeeded by: Norodom Chakravuth
- In office February 1992 – 18 October 2006
- Preceded by: Nhiek Tioulong
- Succeeded by: Keo Puth Rasmey

President of the Norodom Ranariddh Party
- In office November 2006 – October 2008
- Preceded by: Position established
- Succeeded by: Chhim Siek Leng
- In office December 2010 – August 2012
- Preceded by: Chhim Siek Leng
- Succeeded by: Pheng Heng

President of the Community of Royalist People's Party
- In office 16 March 2014 – 17 January 2015
- Preceded by: Position established
- Succeeded by: Position abolished

Member of Parliament for Kampong Cham
- In office 24 November 2017 – 29 July 2018
- In office 25 November 1998 – 12 December 2006

Member of Parliament for Phnom Penh
- In office 14 June 1993 – 26 July 1998

Personal details
- Born: 2 January 1944 Phnom Penh, Cambodia
- Died: 28 November 2021 (aged 77) Aix-en-Provence, France
- Party: FUNCINPEC (1983–2006; 2015–2021)
- Other political affiliations: Community of Royalist People's Party (2014–2015); Norodom Ranariddh Party (2006–2008; 2010–2012)
- Spouses: Eng Marie (m. 1968; div. 2010); Ouk Phalla (m. 2010; died 2018)
- Children: Norodom Chakravuth; Norodom Sihariddh; Norodom Rattana Devi; Norodom Sothearidh; Norodom Ranavong
- Parents: Norodom Sihanouk; Phat Kanhol
- Education: University of Provence
- Website: norodomranariddh.org
- House: Norodom

Norodom Ranariddh (Khmer: នរោត្តម រណឫទ្ធិ; 2 January 1944 – 28 November 2021, UNGEGN: Nôrotdâm Rănăruĕt, ALA-LC: Narottam Raṇaṛddhi [nɔ.roː.ɗɑm raʔ.naʔ.rɨt]) was a Cambodian politician and law academic. He was the second son of King Norodom Sihanouk of Cambodia and a half-brother of King Norodom Sihamoni. Ranariddh was the president of FUNCINPEC, a Cambodian royalist party. He was also the first Prime Minister of Cambodia following the restoration of the monarchy, serving between 1993 and 1997, and subsequently as the President of the National Assembly between 1998 and 2006.

Ranariddh was a graduate of the University of Provence and started his career as a law researcher and lecturer in France. In 1983, he joined FUNCINPEC and in 1986 became the chief of staff and commander-in-chief of Armée nationale sihanoukiste. Ranariddh became Secretary-General of FUNCINPEC in 1989, and its president in 1992. When FUNCINPEC won the 1993 Cambodian general election, it formed a coalition government with the Cambodian People's Party (CPP), which was jointly headed by two concurrently serving prime ministers. Ranariddh became the First Prime Minister of Cambodia while Hun Sen, who was from the CPP, became the Second Prime Minister. As the First Prime Minister, Ranariddh promoted business interests in Cambodia to leaders from regional countries and established the Cambodian Development Council (CDC).

From early 1996, relations between Ranariddh and Hun Sen deteriorated as Ranariddh complained of unequal distribution of government authority between FUNCINPEC and the CPP. Subsequently, both leaders publicly argued over issues such as the implementation of construction projects, signing of property development contracts, and their rival alliances with the Khmer Rouge. In July 1997, major clashes between troops separately aligned to FUNCINPEC and the CPP took place, forcing Ranariddh into exile. The following month, Ranariddh was ousted from his position as First Prime Minister in a coup d'état.

He returned to Cambodia in March 1998, and led his party in the 1998 Cambodian general election. When FUNCINPEC lost the elections to the CPP, Ranariddh, after initially challenging the results, became President of the National Assembly in November 1998. He was seen as a potential successor to Sihanouk as the King of Cambodia, until in 2001 he renounced his interest in the succession. As the President of the National Assembly, Ranariddh was one of the nine members of the throne council which in 2004 selected Sihamoni as Sihanouk's successor.

In March 2006, Ranariddh resigned as the President of the National Assembly and in October 2006 was ousted as President of FUNCINPEC. The following month, he founded the Norodom Ranariddh Party (NRP). Accusations and a conviction of embezzlement drove him into exile again. He returned to Cambodia after being pardoned in September 2008 and retired from politics. Between 2010 and 2012 he unsuccessfully attempted a merger of his NRP with FUNCINPEC. In 2014, he launched the short-lived Community of Royalist People's Party (CRPP) before returning to FUNCINPEC in January 2015. He was subsequently re-elected to the FUNCINPEC presidency.

Ranariddh remained out of public view following a car accident during the 2018 election campaign, which saw the death of his second wife. He made frequent visits to France for medical treatment, and died in November 2021 in Aix-en-Provence.

== Early life ==
Ranariddh was born on 2 January 1944 in Phnom Penh to Sihanouk and his first wife, Phat Kanhol, who was a ballet dancer attached to the royal court. Ranariddh was separated from his mother at three years of age when she remarried, and subsequently grew up mostly under the care of his aunt, Norodom Ketkanya, and grandaunt, Norodom Sobhana. Ranariddh attended primary education at Norodom School and completed part of his high school studies at Lycee Descartes in Phnom Penh. During his childhood, he developed a close relationship with his grandparents, Norodom Suramarit and Sisowath Kossamak, but was distanced from his father.

In 1958, Ranariddh was sent to a boarding school in Marseille together with his half-brother Norodom Chakrapong. Ranariddh initially planned to pursue medical studies as he did well in science subjects, but was persuaded by Kossamak to study law. After finishing high school in 1961, he enrolled in the undergraduate law programme of the University of Paris. He struggled to focus on his studies in Paris, which he attributed to the social distractions that he encountered in the city.

In 1962, Ranariddh enrolled in the law school of the University of Provence. He obtained his bachelor's and master's degrees in 1968 and 1969 respectively, specialising in public law. After completing his master's, Ranariddh took the PhD qualifying examinations in 1969. He returned to Cambodia in January 1970, and worked briefly as a secretary at the Interior Ministry. When Lon Nol staged a successful coup against Sihanouk in March 1970, Ranariddh was dismissed from his job and fled into the jungle where he was a close associate of resistance leaders.

In 1971, Ranariddh was captured, along with several members of the royal family, and was held in prison for six months before being released. He was rearrested the following year, and spent a further three months in detention. In 1973, Ranariddh returned to the University of Provence, where he completed his PhD in 1975. Between 1976 and 1979, he worked as a research fellow at the CNRS, and was awarded a diploma of higher studies in air transport. In 1979 Ranariddh went back to the University of Provence as an associate professor, teaching courses in constitutional law and political sociology.

== Entry into politics ==
=== Initial years in FUNCINPEC ===
When Sihanouk formed FUNCINPEC in 1981, Ranariddh declined his father's invitation to join the party as he disagreed with its association with the Khmer Rouge. In June 1983, Sihanouk urged Ranariddh to leave his teaching career in France and join FUNCINPEC, and this time he agreed. Ranariddh was appointed a personal representative to Sihanouk, and relocated to Bangkok, Thailand, where he took charge of the party's diplomatic and political activities in Asia. In March 1985, Ranariddh was appointed inspector-general of the Armee Nationale Sihanoukiste (ANS), the armed force of FUNCINPEC, and in January 1986 became ANS commander-in-chief and chief-of-staff.

Ranariddh became secretary-general of FUNCINPEC in August 1989, when Sihanouk stepped down as its president. On 10 September 1990, Ranariddh joined the Supreme National Council of Cambodia (SNC), an interim United Nations administrative body tasked with overseeing sovereign affairs of Cambodia. When the 1991 Paris Peace Accords were signed in October of that year, officially ending the Cambodian–Vietnamese War, Ranariddh was one of the SNC signatories. In February 1992, he was elected to the presidency of FUNCINPEC.

=== 1993 elections ===
When the United Nations Transitional Authority in Cambodia (UNTAC) – a parallel administrative body with the SNC – was formed in February 1992, Ranariddh was appointed one of its council members. He spent time travelling between Bangkok and Phnom Penh, and while in Phnom Penh led efforts in opening FUNCINPEC party offices across Cambodia. At the same time, FUNCINPEC began to criticise the ruling CPP, which retaliated with violent attacks by police against low-level FUNCINPEC officials.

The attacks prompted Ranariddh's close aides, Norodom Sirivudh and Sam Rainsy, to advise him against registering the party for the 1993 general elections. However, the chef-de-mission for UNTAC, Yasushi Akashi, encouraged Ranariddh to run in the elections. Persuaded by Akashi, he registered the party and the election campaign began in April 1993. Ranariddh, as well as other FUNCINPEC officials, wore T-shirts depicting Sihanouk on the campaign trail. This nominally complied with an election rule by the UNTAC administration not to use Sihanouk's name during the campaign, who now served as the politically neutral head of the SNC. Voting took place in May 1993; FUNCINPEC secured about 45 percent of the valid votes, winning 58 out of a total of 120 parliamentary seats. The CPP refused to recognise the election results and complained of electoral fraud.

On 3 June 1993, CPP leaders Chea Sim and Hun Sen met with Sihanouk and persuaded him to head an interim government with the CPP and FUNCINPEC as joint coalition partners. Ranariddh, who had not been consulted, expressed surprise. At the same time, the United States and China opposed the plan, prompting Sihanouk to rescind his decision the following day. On 10 June 1993, CPP leaders led by General Sin Song and Chakrapong threatened to secede eight eastern provinces from Cambodia. Ranariddh feared a civil war with the CPP, which had a much larger army than the ANS.

Accordingly, he accepted the idea of FUNCINPEC working with the CPP, and both parties agreed to a dual prime minister arrangement in the new government. On 14 June, Ranariddh presided over a parliamentary meeting which made Sihanouk the Head of State, with Hun Sen and Ranariddh serving as co-Prime Ministers in an interim government. A new constitution was drafted over the next three months, and was adopted in early September. On 24 September 1993, Sihanouk resigned as the head of state and was reinstated as King of Cambodia. In the new government, Ranariddh and Hun Sen were appointed the First Prime Minister and Second Prime Minister, respectively.

== Co-premiership (1993–1997) ==
=== Co-operation and co-administration with CPP ===
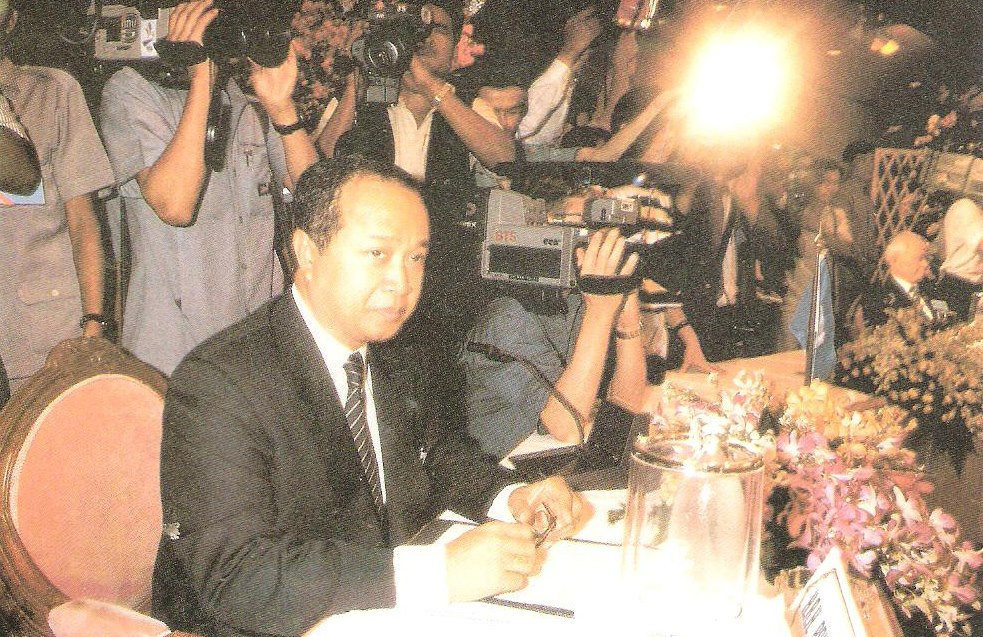
Ranariddh giving a press conference to journalists in 1993

Benny Widyono, the UN secretary-general's representative in Cambodia from 1994 to 1997, has observed that although Ranariddh was nominally senior to Hun Sen, he held less executive power. Ranariddh initially viewed Hun Sen with suspicion, but the pair soon developed a close working relationship, agreeing on most policy decisions made until early 1996. In August 1993, while Cambodia was still under the administration of an interim government, Ranariddh and Hun Sen jointly applied to make the country a member in the International Organization of the Francophonie. The decision to enter the Francophonie sparked a debate among students in higher educational institutes, particularly those from the Institute of Technology of Cambodia who called for French to be replaced with English as the language of instruction. In response, Ranariddh encouraged students to simultaneously learn both English and French.

In August 1995, Ranariddh expressed admiration for the political and economic systems of Singapore, Malaysia and Indonesia. As he saw it, these countries, characterised by hybrid regimes, active economic interventionism and limited press freedom, served as good models to propel Cambodia's socio-economic growth. Ranariddh espoused the view that economic development should take precedence over democratic and human rights. In the initial months of the administration, he actively courted political leaders from various regional countries, including Indonesia, Singapore and Malaysia, with a view to encouraging investment in Cambodia. In early 1994, Ranariddh established the Cambodian Development Council (CDC) to encourage foreign investment, and served as its chairperson. The Malaysian Prime Minister, Mahathir Mohamad, supported Ranariddh's plans, and encouraged Malaysian businessmen to invest and assist in developing the tourism, infrastructural development and telecommunications industries.

As the chairman of the CDC, Ranariddh gave his approval to at least 17 business contracts submitted by Malaysian businessmen between August 1994 and January 1995. The projects mostly covered infrastructural development, and included construction of a racing track, power plants and petrol stations. In November 1994, the CDC opened a tender to build a casino near Sihanoukville and proposals submitted by three companies were shortlisted; Ariston Berhad from Malaysia, Unicentral Corporation from Singapore and Hyatt International from the US. Ariston's proposal was valued at US$1.3 billion, and included bringing a luxury cruise ship with casino to Cambodia, to be used to accommodate tourists until the Sihanoukville resort was built. Before the tender was even concluded, Ariston's ship was brought to Phnom Penh in early December. The Tourism Minister, Veng Sereyvuth suspected that there was backroom dealing activities between CDC and Ariston, who were nevertheless awarded the contract, which Ranariddh signed in January 1995.

In 1992, the UNTAC administration had banned forest logging and timber exports, a major industry and source of foreign earnings. In October 1993, Ranariddh issued an order to lift the ban on a temporary basis so as to allow trees that were already felled to be exported for timber. The Khmer Rouge still controlled large tracts of forests in the regions of western and northern Cambodia bordering Thailand, and helped finance its operations by selling timber to Thai forestry companies. The Cambodian government was unable to impose its will in Khmer Rouge territory, and was eager to regain the logging revenues.

In January 1994, Ranariddh and Hun Sen signed a bilateral agreement with Thai Prime Minister Chuan Leekpai. The agreement provided for felled trees to be legally exported to Thailand on a temporary basis until 31 March 1994. The agreement also arranged for specially designated customs zones to be created within Thai territory, which allowed Cambodian custom officials to inspect the logs and collect export duties.

The logging ban went into force on 31 March 1994, but trees continued to be felled and a new stockpile of timber was created. Ranariddh and Hun Sen gave special authorisation for the lumber to be exported to North Korea. They would continue the practice of periodically lifting export bans and granting special approvals to clear stocks of fallen timber on an on-and off-basis until Ranariddh's ouster in 1997. According to Canadian geographer Philippe Le Billon, Ranariddh and Hun Sen tacitly supported continued Khmer Rouge logging activities as it provided a lucrative backdoor source of cash revenue to finance their own political activities. Under Ranariddh's co-administration, Malaysia's Samling Berhad and Indonesia's Macro-Panin were among the largest beneficiaries of government contracts, as these two logging companies, in 1994–1995, secured rights to log 805,000 hectares and 1.4 million hectares of forests, respectively.

=== Conflicts within the government ===
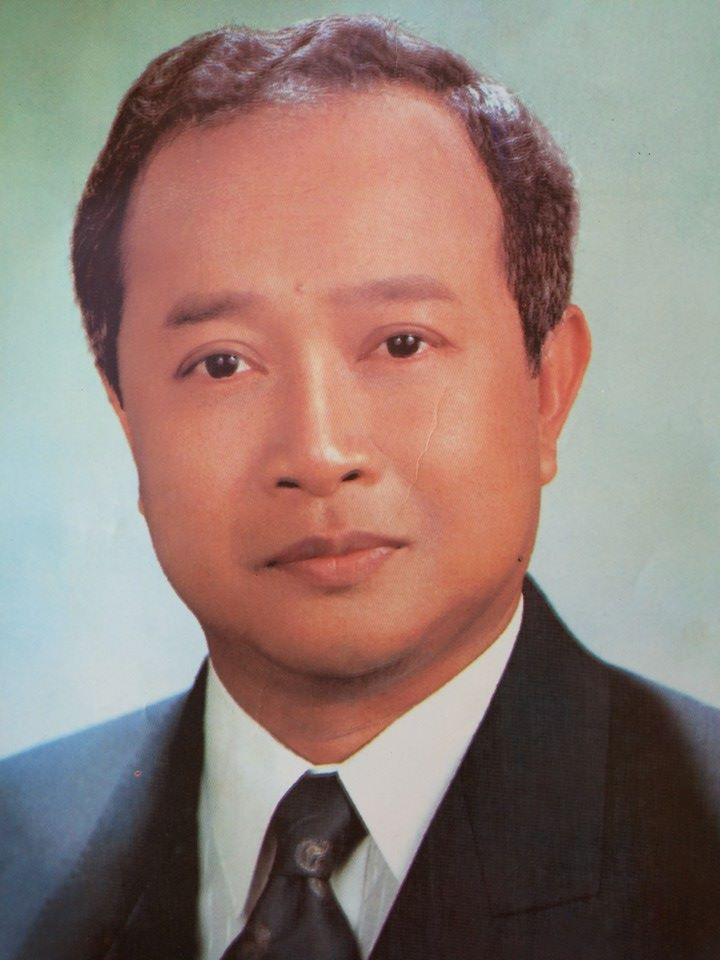
The official portrait of Norodom Ranariddh used while he was the First Prime Minister

In October 1994, Ranariddh and Hun Sen dropped Sam Rainsy as Finance Minister during a cabinet reshuffle. Rainsy had been appointed by Ranariddh in 1993, but both prime ministers became uncomfortable working with Rainsy, because of his pursuit of allegations of government corruption. Rainsy's dismissal upset Norodom Sirivudh, who resigned as Foreign Minister the following month. In March 1995, during an academic forum on corruption in Cambodia, Rainsy publicly questioned Ranariddh's acceptance of a Fokker 28 airplane and a US$108 million commission from Ariston Berhad. This angered Ranariddh, who expelled him from FUNCINPEC in May 1995. The following month, Ranariddh introduced a parliamentary motion to remove Rainsy as a member of parliament (MP).

In 1995, Ranariddh made calls for capital punishment by calling for murderers and drug traffickers to be executed by the state.

From January 1996 onwards, Ranariddh's relations with Hun Sen began to show signs of tension. Hun Sen submitted a government circular to reinstate 7 January as a national holiday, the anniversary of Phnom Penh's liberation from the Khmer Rouge by Vietnamese forces. Ranariddh added his signature to the circular, which incurred the ire of Sihanouk and several FUNCINPEC leaders. A few days later, apparently to tone down dissatisfaction from party members, Ranariddh publicly accused the Army of Vietnam of encroaching into the territories of four Cambodian provinces bordering it. As Widyono saw it, Ranariddh intended to test Hun Sen's response to his accusations, of which the latter chose to remain quiet. During a closed-door FUNCINPEC meeting in the later part of January 1996, party members criticised Hun Sen and the CPP for monopolizing government power, and also chided Ranariddh for being too subservient to Hun Sen.

In February 1996, Ranariddh expressed concern over repeated delays in the construction of the resort-cum-casino complex at Sihanoukville, for which he had signed an agreement with Ariston in January 1995. Ariston blamed the lack of a governmental authority in Sihanoukville for the delay. At the end of April 1996, the government formed the Sihanoukville Developmental Authority (SDA) to oversee regulatory affairs and facilitate development. At a conference in May 1996, Ranariddh charged that CPP-controlled ministries were deliberately delaying the paperwork needed to complete the approval of Ariston's project.

According to Tioulong Saumura, the former deputy governor of Cambodia's Central Bank (and Sam Rainsy's wife), the delays were part of Hun Sen's strategy to undermine projects associated with Ranariddh. In an apparent act of retaliation, Ranariddh directed FUNCINPEC's co-minister of the interior, You Hockry to close down all casinos in the country, citing the absence of authorising legislation. Ranariddh also proposed the cancellation of Ariston's contracts due to the delays. Hun Sen responded by meeting with Mahathir, and assured him that agreements which Ranariddh had previously approved would be honoured.

At a FUNCINPEC congress in March 1996, Ranariddh expressed unhappiness over his relationship with Hun Sen and the CPP. He likened his position as prime minister, and those of the FUNCINPEC ministers, to "puppets". He also questioned the CPP over their delays in appointing FUNCINPEC local officials as district chiefs. Ranariddh threatened to dissolve the National Assembly before the end of 1996, should FUNCINPEC's concerns remain unresolved.

Several FUNCINPEC MPs, including Loy Sim Chheang and Ahmad Yahya, called on Ranariddh to reconcile with Sam Rainsy and work with the newly formed Khmer Nation Party (KNP) in the forthcoming general election. On 27 April 1996 Ranariddh, while vacationing in Paris, attended a meeting with Sihanouk, Rainsy, Chakrapong and Sirivudh. A few days later, Sihanouk issued a declaration praising Hun Sen and the CPP, while also stating that FUNCINPEC had no intention of leaving the coalition government. According to Widyono, Sihanouk's statement was an attempt to defuse the tension between Ranariddh and Hun Sen.

Hun Sen rejected the king's conciliatory overtures, and responded by publishing several public letters attacking Sihanouk, Ranariddh and FUNCINPEC. At a CPP party meeting on 29 June 1996, Hun Sen chided Ranariddh for not following through on his March threat to leave the coalition government and called him a "real dog". At the same time, Hun Sen urged provincial governors from the CPP not attend Ranariddh's rallies.

=== Conflict escalation and military clashes ===
In August 1996, Khmer Rouge leaders Pol Pot and Ieng Sary publicly split, with the former denouncing the latter in a radio broadcast. Ieng Sary responded by disassociating himself from the Khmer Rouge and went on to form his own political party, the Democratic National Union Movement. This prompted Ranariddh and Hun Sen to briefly set their political differences aside to jointly seek a royal pardon for Ieng Sary, who had been sentenced to death by the People's Republic of Kampuchea (PRK) government in 1979. Subsequently, in October and December 1996, both Ranariddh and Hun Sen competed to win Ieng Sary's favour by separately visiting the leader at his fiefdom in Pailin. Hun Sen gained the upper hand, when he convinced Khmer Rouge soldiers under Ieng Sary's charge to join the CPP. Ranariddh canceled a follow-up visit to Samlout, another town located within Ieng Sary's fiefdom, when Sary's soldiers threatened to shoot down Ranariddh's helicopter if he went there.

In September 1996 Ariston Berhad signed three agreements with CPP's minister Sok An, without Ranariddh's knowledge or that of other FUNCINPEC ministers. The agreements provided for the leasing of land to Ariston to develop a golf course, holiday resort and an airport in Sihanoukville. These actions angered Ranariddh, who in a February 1997 letter to Ariston's president Chen Lip Keong, declared the agreements null and void. Subsequently, Ariston claimed that they had tried unsuccessfully to contact FUNCINPEC officials, with a view to getting them to jointly sign the agreements. Hun Sen was offended by Ranariddh's actions, and in April 1997 wrote to Mahathir assuring him of the validity of the agreements.

Ranariddh forged a political coalition by bringing FUNCINPEC to work together with the KNP, the Buddhist Liberal Democratic Party and the Khmer Neutral Party. On 27 January 1997, the four political parties formalised their alliance, which became known as the "National United Front" (NUF). Ranariddh was nominated as the president of the NUF, and stated his intent to lead the alliance against the CPP, in the general elections scheduled to be held in 1998. The CPP issued a statement condemning NUF's formation, and formed a rival coalition consisting of political parties ideologically aligned to the former Khmer Republic.

Meanwhile, Ranariddh stepped up his attacks against Hun Sen, accusing him of harbouring plans to restore a Communist regime should the CPP win the next general election. At the same time Ranariddh attempted to persuade moderate leaders of the Khmer Rouge, including Khieu Samphan and Tep Kunnal, to join the NUF. Khieu Samphan accepted Ranariddh's overtures, and on 21 May 1997, put the support of his party, the Khmer National Solidarity Party (KNSP), behind the NUF. On 4 June 1997, Ranariddh and Samphan signed a communiqué pledging mutual support.

Five days later, customs officials at Sihanoukville discovered a three-ton shipment of rocket launchers, assault rifles and handguns, labelled "spare parts" and consigned to Ranariddh. The rocket launchers were seized by Cambodian Air Force officers aligned to the CPP, while Royal Cambodian Armed Forces (RCAF) officials aligned to FUNCINPEC were allowed to keep the light weapons. In mid-June, Khmer Rouge radio, controlled by Khieu Samphan, broadcast a speech praising the KNSP-NUF alliance and calling for an armed struggle against Hun Sen. Fighting subsequently broke out between Ranariddh's and Hun Sen's bodyguards.

In response Hun Sen issued an ultimatum, calling for Ranariddh to make a choice between siding with the Khmer Rouge or with the coalition government. Eleven days later, he stopped working with Ranariddh altogether. On 3 July 1997, while travelling to Phnom Penh, Ranariddh encountered troops aligned to the CPP. These troops persuaded his bodyguards to surrender their weapons, which prompted him to flee Cambodia the following day. On 5 July, fighting broke out between RCAF troops separately aligned to CPP and FUNCINPEC, after CPP-aligned generals unsuccessfully attempted to coax FUNCINPEC-aligned troops into surrendering their weapons. The FUNCINPEC-aligned units suffered major casualties the following day, and subsequently fled from Phnom Penh to the border town of O Smach in Oddar Meanchey Province.

== Continued leadership in FUNCINPEC (1997–2006) ==
=== Exile, return and 1998 elections ===
The defeat of FUNCINPEC-aligned troops in the military clashes on 6 July 1997 amounted to the effective ouster of Ranariddh. On 9 July 1997, the Cambodian Foreign Ministry issued a white paper labelling Ranariddh a "criminal" and a "traitor", as well as accusing him of conspiring with the Khmer Rouge to destabilise the government. Ranariddh travelled to the Philippines, Singapore and Indonesia, where he met with Fidel Ramos, Goh Chok Tong and Suharto to seek their help in his restoration. During his absence, at a party meeting on 16 July 1997, Ung Huot was nominated by FUNCINPEC MPs loyal to Hun Sen to replace Ranariddh as First Prime Minister.

Huot was subsequently endorsed as First Prime Minister during a National Assembly sitting on 6 August 1997. A few days later, Sihanouk expressed his unhappiness over the clashes, and threatened to abdicate the throne and take over the premiership. Sihanouk also claimed that Ranariddh's ouster was unconstitutional, and initially refused to endorse Ung Huot's appointment, but later relented when Association of Southeast Asian Nations (ASEAN) member states supported Ung Huot's appointment.

In September 1997, the UN secretary general, Kofi Annan met separately with Ranariddh and Hun Sen, to mediate the return of FUNCINPEC politicians and prepare for the 1998 Cambodian general elections. The UN proposed that its representatives monitor the elections, to which both Ranariddh and Hun Sen agreed, but Hun Sen insisted that Ranariddh be prepared to face court charges, to which Ranariddh responded with a threat to boycott the election.

At O Smach, FUNCINPEC-aligned troops fought along with the Khmer Rouge forces against CPP-aligned troops until February 1998, when a ceasefire brokered by the Japanese government came into effect. In March 1998, Ranariddh was convicted in absentia by a military court of illegally smuggling ammunitions in May 1997, and of colluding with the Khmer Rouge to cause instability in the country. He was sentenced to a total of 35 years' imprisonment, but this was nullified by a pardon from Sihanouk. Ranariddh returned to Cambodia at the end of March 1998 to lead FUNCINPEC's election campaign, which focused on pro-monarchical sentiments and anti-Vietnamese rhetoric.

FUNCINPEC faced numerous obstacles, including lack of access to television and radio channels which had come under CPP's exclusive control following the 1997 clashes, and the difficulties of its supporters in getting to party rallies. In the vote on 26 July 1998, FUNCINPEC polled 31.7 percent and secured 43 out of a total of 122 parliamentary seats. The CPP won the elections by polling 41.4 percent of all votes and securing 64 parliamentary seats. The Sam Rainsy Party (SRP), Rainsy's renamed KNP, was in third place with 14.3 percent of the vote and 15 parliamentary seats.

Both Ranariddh and Rainsy protested against the election results, claiming that the CPP-led government had intimidated voters and tampered with ballot boxes. They filed petitions with the National Election Commission (NEC) and Constitutional Court; when these were rejected in August 1998, Ranariddh and Rainsy organised street protests to demand that Hun Sen relinquish power. The government responded on 7 September 1998, by banning street protests and cracking down on participants. At this point Sihanouk intervened, and arranged a summit meeting on 24 September 1998 in Siem Reap. He summoned Hun Sen, Ranariddh and Rainsy for discussions aimed at ending the political impasse.

On the day of the summit meeting, a B40 rocket was fired from an RPG-2 rocket launcher at the direction of Hun Sen's motorcade, who was travelling en route to Siem Reap. The rocket missed the motorcade, and Hun Sen escaped unhurt. The police accused FUNCINPEC and SRP leaders of plotting the attack, with Rainsy as its ringleader. Both Ranariddh and Rainsy denied any involvement, but fled to Bangkok the following day, fearing government crackdowns on their parties.

=== President of the National Assembly (1998–2006) ===
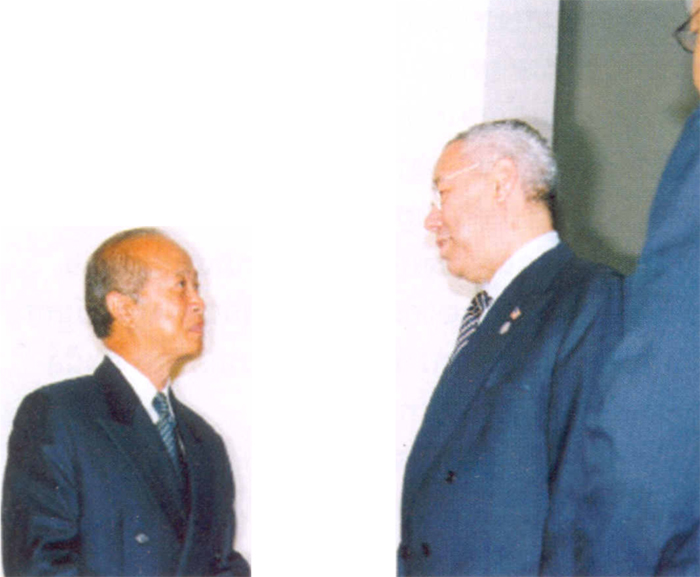
Ranariddh meets US Secretary of State Colin Powell in Phnom Penh, 2003

Following Ranariddh's departure, Sihanouk urged him to return with a view to joining the CPP in a coalition government, reckoning that FUNCINPEC faced the prospect of breaking up if Ranariddh refused. Ranariddh returned to Cambodia on 12 November 1998 to attend a summit meeting hosted by Sihanouk, at which Ranariddh negotiated with Hun Sen and Chea Sim over the structure of a new government. An agreement was reached whereby FUNCINPEC would be given the National Assembly presidency together with several low and mid-level cabinet posts, in exchange for its support for the creation of the Cambodian Senate. On 25 November 1998, Ranariddh was nominated as the President of the National Assembly. According to Mehta, the creation of the Senate was to provide an alternative platform to pass legislation in the event that Ranariddh exerted his influence as the President of the National Assembly to block legislation.

After his appointment, Ranariddh worked with Hun Sen to re-integrate the FUNCINPEC-aligned troops into the RCAF. He also participated in efforts to foster better relations with Vietnam, and liaised with the Vietnamese National Assembly president Nông Đức Mạnh to develop friendship and cooperation initiatives. This led to several mutual visits between Cambodian and Vietnamese political leaders, between 1999 and 2000, but relations between Cambodia and Vietnam deteriorated from September 2000 onwards amid renewed border clashes. Ranariddh steered FUNCINPEC towards political rapprochement with the CPP, and actively discouraged FUNCINPEC ministers and MPs from criticising their CPP counterparts. During the party's congress in March 2001, Ranariddh declared the CPP an "eternal partner".

As early as 1999, a sizeable minority of FUNCINPEC's politicians were unhappy with Ranariddh's leadership, as rumours began to circulate that he had accepted bribes from the CPP. In February 2002, FUNCINPEC performed poorly in the commune elections, winning 10 out of 1,600 commune seats. As a result of FUNCINPEC's poor performance in the commune elections, rifts within the party boiled into the open. In March 2002, the Deputy Commander-in-chief of the RCAF – Khan Savoeun, accused You Hockry, the co-Minister of the Interior, of corruption and nepotism, acts which Savoeun claimed had alienated voters.

When Ranariddh expressed support for Savoeun in May 2002, Hockry resigned. Around the same time, two new political parties, splintered from FUNCINPEC, were formed: the Khmer Soul Party, led by Norodom Chakrapong, and the Hang Dara Democratic Party, led by Hang Dara. Both new parties attracted sizeable numbers of FUNCINPEC defectors, who were apparently unhappy with Ranariddh's leadership. The defections caused Ranariddh to fear that FUNCINPEC would fare poorly in the 2003 general elections.

When general elections were held in July 2003, the CPP won, while FUNCINPEC polled 20.8 percent of the popular vote and secured 26 out of a total of 120 parliamentary seats. This marked an 11 percentage point drop in FUNCINPEC's share of the popular vote compared with 1998. Both Ranariddh and Sam Rainsy, whose SRP had also participated in the elections, expressed unhappiness with the outcome of the election, and once again accused the CPP of winning through fraud and voter intimidation. They also refused to support a CPP-led government, which needed the joint support of more MPs from FUNCINPEC or SRP to attain the two-thirds majority in forming a new government.

Subsequently, in August 2003, Ranariddh and Rainsy formed a new political alliance, the "Alliance of Democrats" (AD), and together they lobbied upon the CPP to form a three-party government consisting of the CPP, FUNCINPEC and the SRP. At the same time, they also called for Hun Sen to step down and a reform of the NEC, which they claimed was stacked with pro-CPP appointees. Hun Sen rejected their demands, bringing several months of political stalemate.

In March 2004, Ranariddh privately proposed to Hun Sen that FUNCINPEC should join CPP in the new government as a junior coalition partner. Discussions between CPP and FUNCINPEC began on the composition of the coalition government and legislative procedures. An agreement was reached in June 2004, when Ranariddh walked out of his alliance with Rainsy, dropped his demands to reform the NEC and once again pledged to support Hun Sen as Prime Minister. Hun Sen also pressured Ranariddh into supporting a constitutional amendment known as a "package vote", which required MPs to support legislation and ministerial appointments by an open show of hands.

While Ranariddh acquiesced to Hun Sen's demand, the "package vote" amendment was opposed by Sihanouk, Chea Sim, the SRP as well as several senior leaders within FUNCINPEC. After the "package vote" amendment was passed in July 2004, several FUNCINPEC leaders resigned in protest. Ranariddh, who remained as President of the National Assembly as part of the agreement, attempted to lure SRP leaders into defecting to FUNCINPEC with the promise of jobs within the government. At least one senior SRP leader, Ou Bun Long, caved into Ranariddh's enticements.

=== Exit from FUNCINPEC ===
On 2 March 2006, the National Assembly passed a constitutional amendment which required only a simple majority of parliamentarians to support a government, instead of the two-thirds majority that was previously stipulated. Rainsy had first proposed the amendment in February 2006, who had hoped that a simple majority would make it easier for his party to form a government should they win in future elections. The following day after the constitutional amendment was passed, Hun Sen relieved Norodom Sirivudh and Nhek Bun Chhay of their posts as FUNCINPEC's co-minister of interior and co-minister of defense respectively. Ranariddh protested against the dismissals, and resigned as the President of the National Assembly on 14 March. He then left Cambodia, to reside in France. Shortly after his departure, local tabloids published stories that Ranariddh had had an affair with Ouk Phalla, an Apsara dancer.

In early September 2006, a new law was passed to outlaw adultery, and Ranariddh responded by accusing the government of attempting to undermine FUNCINPEC. On 18 September 2006, Hun Sen and Nhek Bun Chhay called for Ranariddh to be replaced as FUNCINPEC's president, after party reports suggested that Phalla had lobbied Ranariddh to appoint her relatives to government posts. On 18 October 2006, Nhek Bun Chhay convened a party congress which dismissed Ranariddh from his position as FUNCINPEC's president. In turn, he was given the titular position of "Historic President". At the congress, Nhek Bun Chhay justified Ranariddh's ouster on the grounds of his deteriorating relations with Hun Sen as well as his practice of spending prolonged periods of time overseas.

== Later political activities (2006–2021) ==
=== Norodom Ranariddh Party, exile and retirement ===
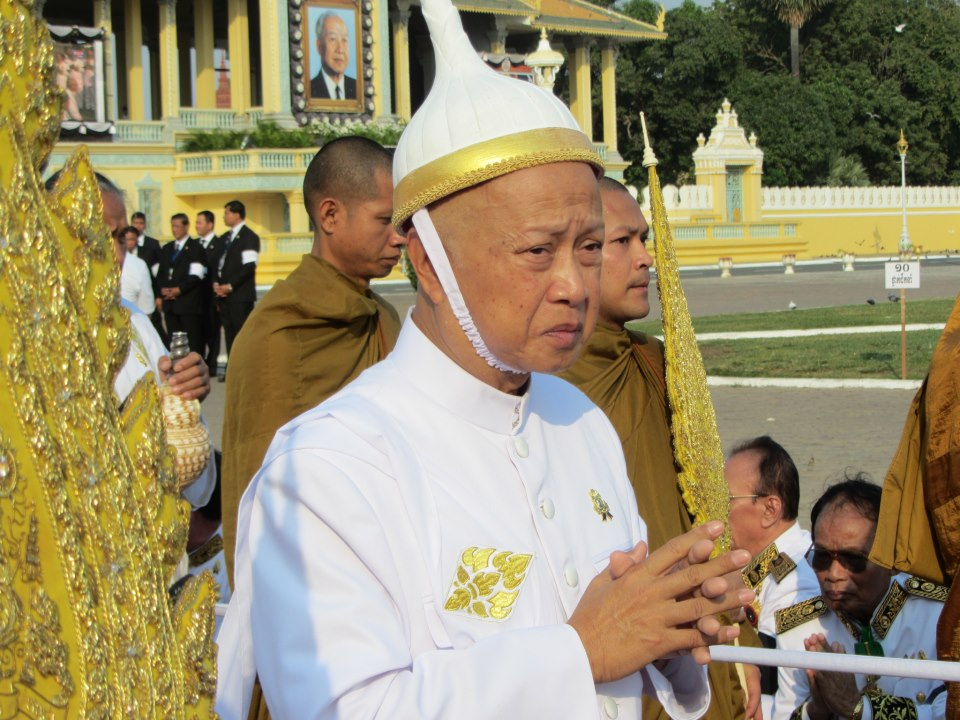
Ranariddh at the funeral of his father, Norodom Sihanouk, in February 2013

Following Ranariddh's exit from FUNCINPEC, Nhek Bun Chhay filed a lawsuit in November 2006, accusing Ranariddh of pocketing $3.6 million from the sale of its headquarters to the French embassy in 2005. In mid-November, Ranariddh returned to Cambodia and formed the Norodom Ranariddh Party (NRP), of which he became its president. The following month, the National Assembly expelled Ranariddh as an MP. Within days his wife, Eng Marie, sued him for adultery. Ranariddh's half-brother Chakrapong was also expelled from the party, and joined the NRP as the party's deputy president.

In March 2007, Ranariddh was convicted by the Phnom Penh Municipal Court of embezzlement of the sale proceeds of FUNCINPEC headquarters, and sentenced to 18 months imprisonment. To avoid imprisonment, Ranariddh sought asylum in Malaysia shortly before the sentencing.

While living in exile in Malaysia, Ranariddh communicated to NRP party members and supporters through telephone and video conferencing. In November 2007, he proposed a merger between the NRP, SRP and the Human Rights Party, to better their prospects against the CPP in the 2008 general elections. Rainsy, the leader of the SRP, rejected his proposal. When the election campaign began in June 2008, Ranariddh, though not able to enter the country, raised issues such as border disputes with Cambodia's neighbours, illegal logging, and promised to lower petrol prices.

When voting took place in July, the NRP won two parliamentary seats. Immediately after the election, the NRP joined the SRP and the HRP in charging the Election Commission with irregularities. The NRP subsequently dropped their accusations, after Hun Sen brokered a secret deal with Ranariddh which allowed the latter to return from exile, in exchange for the NRP's recognition of the election results.

In September 2008, Ranariddh received a royal pardon from Sihamoni (who had succeeded to the throne in October 2004) for his embezzlement conviction, allowing him to return to Cambodia without risking imprisonment.

Following his return, Ranariddh retired from politics and pledged to support the CPP-led government. He dedicated most of his time to philanthropic work and supporting royal activities. In late 2010, NRP and FUNCINPEC leaders including Nhek Bun Chhay publicly called for Ranariddh to return to politics. Ranariddh initially resisted the calls, but changed his mind and returned in December 2010. For the next one-and-a-half years, Ranariddh and Nhek Bun Chhay negotiated a merger between NRP and FUNCINPEC. An agreement was formalised in May 2012, whereby Ranariddh would be made the president of FUNCINPEC, while Nhek Bun Chhay would become its vice-president. The merger agreement was rescinded a month later, when Nhek Bun Chhay accused Ranariddh of supporting other opposition parties. Two months later, Ranariddh retired from politics for a second time and resigned as the president of NRP.

=== Community of Royalist People's Party ===
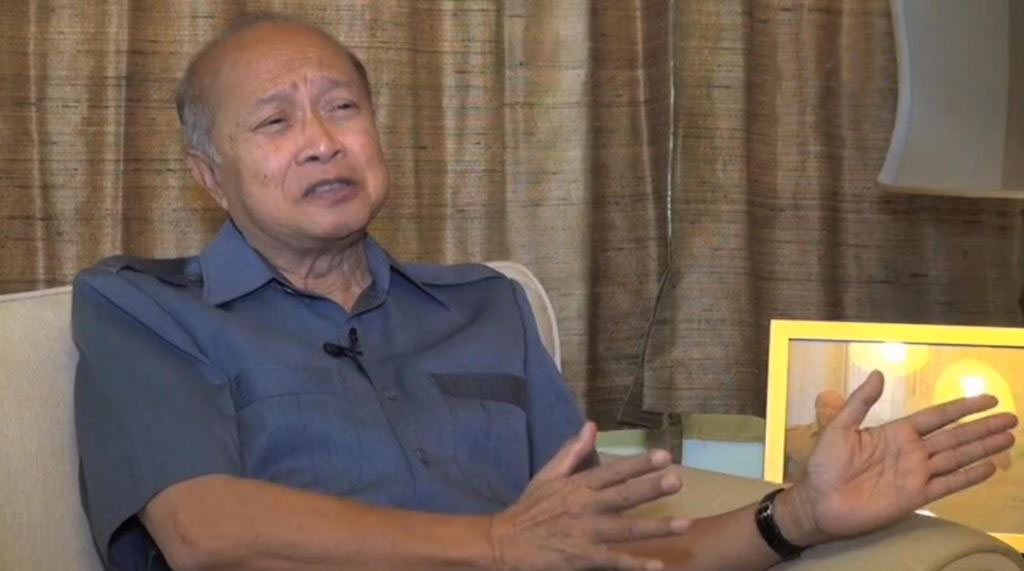
Norodom Ranariddh speaking to interviewers from the Voice of America in February 2014.

In March 2014, Ranariddh came out of retirement to launch a new political party, the Community of Royalist People's Party (CRPP). Sam Rainsy, now president of the Cambodian National Rescue Party (CNRP), accused Ranariddh of intending to split the opposition vote to favour the ruling CPP in future elections. Ranariddh responded by accusing the CNRP of harbouring republican sentiments, while also stating that his motivation in launching CRPP was to reunite royalist supporters within the Cambodian electorate. The CRPP attracted support from some senior FUNCINPEC party members; in December 2014 an ex-secretary of state, a senator and a deputy police chief declared their support for the CRPP. Hun Sen then proposed to Ranariddh that he return to FUNCINPEC.

=== Return to FUNCINPEC ===
In January 2015, Ranariddh dissolved the CRPP and returned to FUNCINPEC. At a party congress on 19 January 2015, he was reappointed FUNCINPEC president; his half-sister and previous FUNCINPEC president, Norodom Arunrasmy, became the first vice-president, while Nhek Bun Chhay was appointed second vice-president. In March 2015, Ranariddh held another party congress where he appointed four more vice-presidents to the FUNCINPEC executive committee. He also convinced the congress to adopt a new party logo, which had a design almost identical that of the now-defunct CRPP.

Ranariddh supported the formation of the Cambodian Royalist Youth Movement in July 2015, a youth organisation aimed at garnering electoral support for FUNCINPEC from younger voters, of which he was appointed its honorary president. In November 2017, he returned to the National Assembly as a member of parliament, following the dissolution of the Cambodia National Rescue Party, after which the FUNCINPEC received 41 of the 55 vacated seats. The party performed poorly in the 2018 general election, failing to win a single seat in the National Assembly. Though they were runners-up behind the Cambodian People's Party, their tally of popular vote was fewer than the 594,659 invalid ballots cast by disenfranchised supporters of the former opposition.

== Palace relations ==
=== Awards and royal appointments ===
In June 1993 Ranariddh was granted the Cambodian royal title of "Sdech Krom Luong" (Khmer: ស្ដេចក្រុមលួង), which translates as "Senior Prince" in English. Five months later, in November 1993, he was elevated to the rank of "Samdech Krom Preah" (Khmer: សម្ដេចក្រុមព្រះ), or "Leading Senior Prince" in English, in recognition of his efforts to re-instate Sihanouk as the King of Cambodia. Ranariddh has been a recipient of several awards from the palace; in December 1992 he was decorated as the Grand Officer of the Royal Order of Cambodia. In May 2001 he received the Grand Order of National Merit and in October 2001 was awarded the Order of Sovatara, with the class of Mohasereivadh. He was also awarded the Grand Officer de l'Ordre de la Pleaide by the La Francophonie in March 2000.

In December 2008, Sihamoni appointed Ranariddh as President of the Supreme Privy Council of Cambodia, equivalent in rank to that of prime minister, and, during an interview in December 2010 Ranariddh revealed that this royal appointment entitled him to a monthly salary of three million riels (about United States dollar750).

=== Candidacy to the throne ===
Debates on the succession to the throne began in November 1993, shortly after Sihanouk was diagnosed with cancer. In a 1995 poll of 700 people conducted by the Khmer Journalists' Associations, 24 percent of respondents preferred Ranariddh to take the throne, although a larger proportion indicated no preference over any members of the royal family. In a March 1996 interview with the Cambodia Daily, Sihanouk encouraged Ranariddh to succeed him as king, but also expressed concern that a leadership vacuum within FUNCINPEC would occur, should Ranariddh accede.

Sihanouk repeated these concerns in an interview with the Phnom Penh Post in February 1997. Sihanouk mentioned Sihamoni as another potential candidate, despite the latter's view that the responsibilities attached to the throne were "frightening". Sihamoni's candidacy found favour with Hun Sen and Chea Sim, because of his non-involvement in politics.

In two reports from 1993 and 1996, Ranariddh rejected the notion of becoming the next king. In November 1997, Ranariddh suggested that his outspoken and passionate personality made him an unsuitable candidate for the throne. However, by March 1999 Ranariddh became more receptive to the idea of succeeding his father. In early 2001, in an interview to Harish Mehta, Ranariddh discussed his conflicting desires between taking the throne and staying in politics.

In November 2001, Ranariddh told the Cambodia Daily that he had decided to prioritize his political career over the throne. In the same interview, he added that Sihamoni had in the past supported him to become the next king. In September 2004, Ranariddh revealed that although he had been offered the throne by both Sihanouk and Monineath, who was Sihamoni's mother, he would prefer to see Sihamoni take the throne. When the throne council convened in October 2004 to select Sihanouk's successor, Ranariddh was part of the council which unanimously chose Norodom Sihamoni to be the next king.

== Personal life and death ==
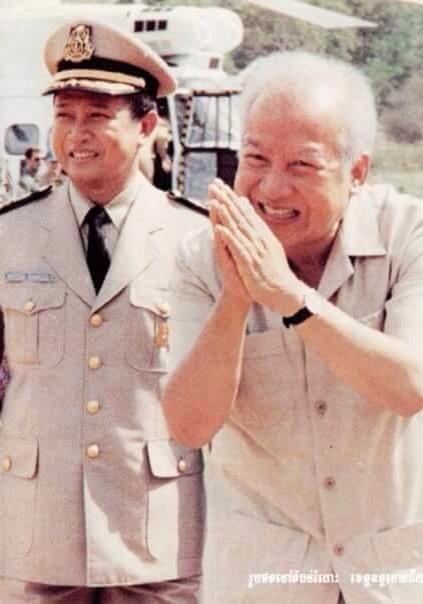
Ranariddh (left) on an inspection tour with Sihanouk (right) while serving in the ANS during the 1980s

Ranariddh was known for his physical resemblance to his father Sihanouk, inheriting his facial features, high-pitched voice and mannerisms. Contemporaries including Harish Mehta, Lee Kuan Yew and Benny Widyono (Oei Hong Lan) have so stated after meeting with him. An opinion poll conducted in July 1997 by the Cambodian Information Centre also supports similar observations of Ranariddh's physical resemblance to Sihanouk. Journalists such as those from the Phnom Penh Post have observed that Ranariddh had used his resemblance to canvass support for FUNCINPEC during the 1993 and 1998 general elections. Ranariddh acknowledged these observations during an interview with Mehta in 2001, saying:

People adore the king and I look like him. It is not my achievement they are remembering, but the deeds of my father. On the contrary, if I fail the people would say "Oh, you are the son, but you are not like your father". It's rather a burden.

Ranariddh spoke Khmer, French and English fluently. He also held dual Cambodian and French citizenship, having obtained the latter in 1979. He enjoyed listening to music and watching films, though in a 2001 interview he described himself as lacking the artistic talent which Sihanouk possessed. In 2002, Ranariddh produced and directed a 90-minute film, titled Raja Bori, which was shot at Angkor Wat.

On 28 November 2021, Minister of Information Khieu Kanharith announced that Ranariddh had died at the age of 77 in France.

=== Family ===
Ranariddh had 12 half-siblings from his father by different wives; Norodom Buppha Devi is his only full-sibling. Buppha Devi became a ballet dancer, like her mother Phat Kanhol had been during her younger days. Kanhol remarried in 1947 to a military officer, Chap Huot, and had five children with him. Phat Kanhol died from cancer in February 1969 at the age of 49, and Chap Huot was killed in an explosion a year later. Four of their children, Ranariddh's half-siblings, were also killed during the Khmer Rouge years, while their son Nhalyvoud survived. Chap Nhalyvoud served as the governor of Siem Reap Province between 1998 and 2004.

Ranariddh met his first wife, Eng Marie, in early 1968. Marie was the eldest child of Eng Meas, an Interior Ministry official of Sino-Khmer descent, and Sarah Hay, a Muslim of Cham ethnicity. Marie had nine younger siblings, and among them was Roland Eng, the former ambassador to Thailand and the United States. The couple married in September 1968 at the royal palace, and had three children: Chakravuth (born 1970), Sihariddh (born 1972) and Rattana Devi (born 1974).

The couple separated, and Marie filed for divorce in March 2006 when Ranariddh's relationship with Ouk Phalla became known. The divorce was not finalised until June 2010. Ranariddh had two sons with Ouk Phalla: Sothearidh (born 2003) and Ranavong (born 2011). Phalla was a descendant of King Sisowath and was a classical dancer. She met Ranariddh when the latter was producing and directing the film Raja Bori.

On 17 June 2018, Ranariddh and Ouk Phalla were both seriously injured in a car accident en route to Sihanoukville Province. Ouk Phalla died hours later as a result of her injuries. In 2019, Ranariddh went to Paris to receive medical treatment for a broken pelvis.

== Bibliography ==
- Chin, Kin Wah (2005). Southeast Asian Affairs 2005. Singapore: Institute of Southeast Asian Studies. ISBN 9812303065.
- Kiernan, Ben & Hughes, Caroline (2007). Conflict and Change in Cambodia. London: Routledge. ISBN 9780415385923.
- Mehta, Harish C. & Julie B. (2013). Strongman: The Extraordinary Life of Hun Sen. Singapore: Marshall Cavendish International Asia Pte Ltd. ISBN 978-9814484602.
- Mehta, Harish C. (2001). Warrior Prince: Norodom Ranariddh, Son of King Sihanouk of Cambodia. Singapore: Graham Brash. ISBN 9812180869.
- Narong, Men S. (2005). Who's Who in Cambodia: Special Focus on the Royal Family 2005–2006. Phnom Penh: Media Business Networks. ISBN 2951352409.
- Norodom, Ranariddh (2014). Mission to serve the Father of the Cambodian Nation (សកម្មភាពបំរើ ព្រះវររាជបិតាជាតិខ្មែរ) (in Khmer). Phnom Penh: Norodom Ranariddh Foundation.
- Peou, Sorpong (2000). Intervention & Change in Cambodia: Towards Democracy?. Singapore: Institute of Southeast Asian Studies. ISBN 9813055391.
- Strangio, Sebastian (2014). Hun Sen's Cambodia. New Haven, Connecticut: Yale University Press. ISBN 978-0300210149.
- Summers, Laura (2003). The Far East and Australasia 2003. New York: Psychology Press. pp. 227–43. ISBN 1857431332.
- Widyono, Benny (2008). Dancing in Shadows: Sihanouk, the Khmer Rouge, and the United Nations in Cambodia. Lanham, Maryland: Rowman & Littlefield. ISBN 978-0742555532.

Norodom Ranariddh House of Norodom Born: 2 January 1944 Died: 28 November 2021
Political offices
| Preceded by Hun Sen | Prime Minister of Cambodia; 1993–1997 | Succeeded by Ung Huot |
| Preceded by Chea Sim | President of the National Assembly of Cambodia; 1998–2006 | Succeeded by Heng Samrin |
Party political offices
| Preceded by Norodom Arunrasmy | President of the Funcinpec Party; 2015–2021 | Vacant |
| New office | President of the Community of Royalist People's Party; 2014–2015 | Position abolished Dissolution of CRPP |
| New office | President of the Norodom Ranariddh Party; 2006–2008 | Succeeded by Chhim Siek Leng |
| Preceded by Nhiek Tioulong | President of the Funcinpec Party; 1992–2006 | Succeeded by Keo Puth Rasmey |
