= Keo Puth Rasmey =

Cambodian politician (born 1952)

His Excellency Keo Puth Rasmey
- កែវ ពុទ្ធរស្មី

President of the FUNCINPEC Party
- In office 2006–2011
- Preceded by: Norodom Ranariddh
- Succeeded by: Nhek Bun Chhay

Personal details
- Born: 1 October 1952 (age 73) Kampong Cham, Cambodia, French Indochina
- Party: FUNCINPEC
- Spouse: Norodom Arunrasmy (m. 1991)

Keo Puth Rasmey (Khmer: កែវ ពុទ្ធរស្មី; born 1 October 1952) is a Cambodian politician. On 19 October 2006 he was appointed to lead Funcinpec, the royalist party of Cambodia, replacing former leader Norodom Ranariddh. He is the son-in-law of Norodom Sihanouk, former king of Cambodia, and is of Cambodian descent. When his wife Arunrasmey resigned as the First Vice President of FUNCINPEC in March 2015, Keo was appointed to replace her as the First Vice President.

== See also ==
- Politics of Cambodia
