= Cambodian Red Cross =

Cambodian humanitarian organization

- កាកបាទក្រហមកម្ពុជា
- Abbreviation: CRC
- Formation: 18 February 1955
- Type: Non-governmental organization
- Purpose: Humanitarian
- Headquarters: Phnom Penh, Cambodia
- Region served: Cambodia
- Members: International Federation of Red Cross and Red Crescent Societies; International Red Cross and Red Crescent Movement
- Official language: Khmer and English
- Honorary President: Queen Mother Norodom Monineath
- President: Bun Rany
- Main organ: General Assembly
- Website: redcross.org.kh

The Cambodian Red Cross (CRC; Khmer: កាកបាទក្រហមកម្ពុជា, UNGEGN: Kakâbat Krâhâm Kâmpŭchéa, ALA-LC: Kākapād Kraham Kambujā [kaːkaɓaːt krɑːhɑːm kampuciə]) is the largest humanitarian organization in Cambodia. Established on 18 February 1955, it is officially recognized by the Royal Government as the primary auxiliary to the public authorities in humanitarian services. It was recognized by the International Committee on 7 October 1960, and admitted as a Member of the International Federation of Red Cross and Red Crescent Societies on 8 October 1960.
