= 2nd National Assembly of Cambodia =

←	1st	3rd	→

Overview
- Jurisdiction: Cambodia
- Term: 25 November 1998 – 27 July 2003
- Election: 26 July 1998

National Assembly
- Members: 122
- President: Norodom Ranariddh
- First Vice President: Heng Samrin
- Second Vice President: Nguon Nhel
- Prime Minister: Hun Sen
- Party control: Cambodian People's Party

Members of the second National Assembly (Khmer: រដ្ឋសភាអាណត្តិទី២) were elected on 26 July 1998.

== Composition ==
Party	MPs	Of total
Cambodian People's Party	64	52.46%
FUNCINPEC	43	35.24%
Sam Rainsy Party	15	12.30%
Total	122	100%

== List of members ==
Cambodian People's Party
FUNCINPEC
Sam Rainsy Party

Constituency	Seats	Members
Banteay	6	Moanh Kosal
Banteay	6	Phit Pornou
Banteay	6	Von Kan
Banteay	6	Hang Yuth
Banteay	6	Men Saroeun
Banteay	6	Kimsour Phirith
Battambang	8	Sar Kheng
Battambang	8	Muy Chat
Battambang	8	Ly Kim Leang
Battambang	8	Ky Lomorng
Battambang	8	Phorn Chantha
Battambang	8	Sou Zakaryya
Battambang	8	Cheam Channy
Battambang	8	Lon Phon
Kampong Cham	18	Heng Samrin
Kampong Cham	18	Math Ly
Kampong Cham	18	Chhor Leang Huot
Kampong Cham	18	Chin Kimsreng
Kampong Cham	18	Hor Namhong
Kampong Cham	18	Yos Son
Kampong Cham	18	Im Run
Kampong Cham	18	Norodom Ranariddh
Kampong Cham	18	Ismail Yusoh
Kampong Cham	18	Ek Vandy
Kampong Cham	18	Khim Chamroeun
Kampong Cham	18	Khun Phinub
Kampong Cham	18	Monh Saphan
Kampong Cham	18	Oak Socheat
Kampong Cham	18	You Hockry
Kampong Cham	18	Sam Rainsy
Kampong Cham	18	Hor Sopheap
Kampong Cham	18	Lim Sokun
Kampong Chhnang	4	Kong Sam Ol
Kampong Chhnang	4	Nuon Sok
Kampong Chhnang	4	Paing Punyamin
Kampong Chhnang	4	Nan Sy
Kampong Speu	6	Say Chhum
Kampong Speu	6	Hem Khan
Kampong Speu	6	Ly Son
Kampong Speu	6	Samrith Pech
Kampong Speu	6	Kim San
Kampong Speu	6	Thach Sang
Kampong Thom	6	Nguon Nhel
Kampong Thom	6	Khieu Horl
Kampong Thom	6	Poa Try
Kampong Thom	6	Un Neung
Kampong Thom	6	Ning Sen
Kampong Thom	6	Peng Ly
Kampot	6	Ney Pena
Kampot	6	Salah Sen
Kampot	6	Soam Chin
Kampot	6	Soam Kimsour
Kampot	6	Ear Limsour
Kampot	6	Soa Ning
Kandal	11	Hun Sen
Kandal	11	Ho Non
Kandal	11	Khuon Sodary
Kandal	11	Mom Chim Huy
Kandal	11	Chea Chan Sarin
Kandal	11	Dean Del
Kandal	11	Hong Sun Huot
Kandal	11	Khlok Buthdy
Kandal	11	Nuth Sokhom
Kandal	11	Sam Sundoeun
Kandal	11	Yim Sokha
Koh Kong	1	Ay Khorn
Kratié	3	Nuth Narang
Kratié	3	Norodom Diyat
Kratié	3	Huot Pongly
Mondulkiri	1	Rath Sarem
Phnom Penh	12	Keat Chhon
Phnom Penh	12	Hou Sry
Phnom Penh	12	Osman Hassan
Phnom Penh	12	Um Nhanh
Phnom Penh	12	Keo Remy
Phnom Penh	12	Sam Ramsek
Phnom Penh	12	So Chy
Phnom Penh	12	Tol Los
Phnom Penh	12	Moanh Siyon
Phnom Penh	12	Sit Ibrahim
Phnom Penh	12	Tioulong Saumura
Phnom Penh	12	Yim Sovann
Preah Vihear	1	Suk Sam Eng
Prey Veng	11	Chea Soth
Prey Veng	11	Cheam Yeab
Prey Veng	11	Ek Sam Ol
Prey Veng	11	Min Sean
Prey Veng	11	Vann Sunheng
Prey Veng	11	Nhim Vanda
Prey Veng	11	Pen Panha
Prey Veng	11	Sisowath Santa
Prey Veng	11	Sok San
Prey Veng	11	Veng Sereyvuth
Prey Veng	11	Kouch Ky
Pursat	4	Sar Kapun
Pursat	4	Sman Teat
Pursat	4	Cheam Un
Pursat	4	Say Mongkul
Ratankiri	1	Bou Thang
Siem Reap	6	Tea Banh
Siem Reap	6	Sieng Nam
Siem Reap	6	Hong Tuhay
Siem Reap	6	Norodom Vichara
Siem Reap	6	Khin Khean
Siem Reap	6	Son Chhay
Sihanoukville	1	Suos Kanan
Stung Treng	1	Vann Vuth
Svay Rieng	5	Men Sam An
Svay Rieng	5	Chem Sguon
Svay Rieng	5	Him Chhem
Svay Rieng	5	Hul Savorn
Svay Rieng	5	Lek Donal
Takéo	8	Sok An
Takéo	8	Chao Sophon
Takéo	8	Nin Saphon
Takéo	8	Prak Thuch
Takéo	8	Hean Vanroth
Takéo	8	Khek Vandy
Takéo	8	Lor Sary
Takéo	8	Hong Sokheng
Kep	1	Kea Sahorn
Pailin	1	Sun Kimhun
Total	122	

Source: National Assembly of Cambodia (in Khmer)
