= 1st National Assembly of Cambodia =

2nd	→

Overview
- Jurisdiction: Cambodia
- Term: 14 June 1993 – 26 July 1998
- Election: 23 & 28 May 1993

Constituent Assembly
- Members: 120
- President: Son Sann (1993); Chea Sim (1993–98)
- Prime Minister: First PM: Norodom Ranariddh (1993–97) Ung Huot (1997–98); Second PM: Hun Sen (1993–98)

Members of the first Constituent Assembly (Khmer: សភាធម្មនុញ្ញអាណត្តិទី១) were elected on 23 and 28 May 1993.

== Composition ==
Party	MPs	Of total
FUNCINPEC	58	48.33%
Cambodian People's Party	51	42.50%
Buddhist Liberal Democratic Party	10	8.33%
MOULINAKA	1	0.83%
Total	120	100%

== List of members ==
FUNCINPEC
Cambodian People's Party
Buddhist Liberal Democratic Party
MOULINAKA

Constituency	Seats	Members
Banteay Meanchey Province	6	Ke Kim Yan
Banteay Meanchey Province	6	Phit Pornou
Banteay Meanchey Province	6	Mean Sarin
Banteay Meanchey Province	6	Thong Nov
Banteay Meanchey Province	6	Men Saroeun
Banteay Meanchey Province	6	Lay Khaek
Battambang Province	8	Sar Kheng
Battambang Province	8	Chheang Vun
Battambang Province	8	Chuon Bunthol
Battambang Province	8	Serey Kosal
Battambang Province	8	Ky Lomorng
Battambang Province	8	Phlong Sareth
Battambang Province	8	Ly Nareth
Battambang Province	8	Son Soubert
Kampong Cham Province	18	Hun Sen
Kampong Cham Province	18	Math Ly
Kampong Cham Province	18	Chhor Leang Huot
Kampong Cham Province	18	Keat Chhon
Kampong Cham Province	18	Dith Munty
Kampong Cham Province	18	Im Sothy
Kampong Cham Province	18	Norodom Sirivudh
Kampong Cham Province	18	Chhim Siek Leng
Kampong Cham Province	18	You Hockry
Kampong Cham Province	18	Nuon Nynara
Kampong Cham Province	18	Loy Sim Chheang
Kampong Cham Province	18	Monh Saphan
Kampong Cham Province	18	Tao Senghour
Kampong Cham Province	18	Sen Slaymann
Kampong Cham Province	18	Khun Phinub
Kampong Cham Province	18	Por Bunsry
Kampong Cham Province	18	Sar Sa Ath
Kampong Cham Province	18	Ros Roeun
Kampong Chhnang Province	4	Kong Sam Ol
Kampong Chhnang Province	4	Ouk Rabun
Kampong Chhnang Province	4	Chhim Chhorn
Kampong Chhnang Province	4	Eam Ra
Kampong Speu Province	6	Say Chhum
Kampong Speu Province	6	Hem Khan
Kampong Speu Province	6	Samrith Pech
Kampong Speu Province	6	Mam Samy
Kampong Speu Province	6	Ros Chheng
Kampong Speu Province	6	Pen Thol
Kampong Thom Province	6	Nguon Nhel
Kampong Thom Province	6	Un Neung
Kampong Thom Province	6	Chean Chanto
Kampong Thom Province	6	Khan Savoeun
Kampong Thom Province	6	So Chy
Kampong Thom Province	6	Pol Hom
Kampot Province	6	Ney Pena
Kampot Province	6	Chay Saing Yun
Kampot Province	6	Som Kimsuor
Kampot Province	6	Chau Sen Chomno
Kampot Province	6	Eng Roland
Kampot Province	6	Chum Kimeng
Kandal Province	11	Heng Samrin
Kandal Province	11	Chea Soth
Kandal Province	11	Mom Chim Huy
Kandal Province	11	Ung Keat
Kandal Province	11	Ung Huot
Kandal Province	11	Kan Morn
Kandal Province	11	Hing Sarin
Kandal Province	11	Seng Tong
Kandal Province	11	Pin Dam
Kandal Province	11	Soam Chanboth
Kandal Province	11	Mea Chanleap
Koh Kong Province	1	Rong Phlam Kesorn
Kratié Province	3	Chhea Thang
Kratié Province	3	Ven Sokhoy
Kratié Province	3	Soth Soy
Mondulkiri Province	1	Beuy Kerk
Phnom Penh	12	Chea Sim
Phnom Penh	12	Im Chhun Lim
Phnom Penh	12	Thor Peng Leat
Phnom Penh	12	Khieu Kanharith
Phnom Penh	12	Norodom Ranariddh
Phnom Penh	12	Duong Khaem
Phnom Penh	12	Sam Kanitha
Phnom Penh	12	Amath Yashya
Phnom Penh	12	Oam Reach Sady
Phnom Penh	12	Sao Samuth
Phnom Penh	12	Ek Sereywath
Phnom Penh	12	Son Sann
Preah Vihear Province	1	Suk Sam Eng
Prey Veng Province	11	Cheam Yeab
Prey Veng Province	11	Ek Sam Ol
Prey Veng Province	11	Pen Panha
Prey Veng Province	11	Vann Sunheng
Prey Veng Province	11	Bin Chhin
Prey Veng Province	11	Min Sean
Prey Veng Province	11	Veng Sereyvuth
Prey Veng Province	11	Khin Khean
Prey Veng Province	11	Men Sam Ean
Prey Veng Province	11	Ros Hean
Prey Veng Province	11	Ieng Mouly
Pursat Province	4	Suy Sem
Pursat Province	4	Sar Kapun
Pursat Province	4	Yim Savy
Pursat Province	4	Cheam Un
Ratanakiri Province	1	Bou Thang
Siem Reap Province	6	Tea Banh
Siem Reap Province	6	Long Hib
Siem Reap Province	6	Sam Rainsy
Siem Reap Province	6	Kieng Vang
Siem Reap Province	6	Hem Bunheng
Siem Reap Province	6	Son Chhay
Sihanoukville	1	Pou Sothirak
Stung Treng Province	1	Vann Vuth
Svay Rieng Province	5	Men Sam An
Svay Rieng Province	5	Chem Sguon
Svay Rieng Province	5	Him Chhem
Svay Rieng Province	5	Ung Phan
Svay Rieng Province	5	Srey Mondul
Takéo Province	8	Sok An
Takéo Province	8	So Khun
Takéo Province	8	Nin Saphon
Takéo Province	8	Tep Nunry
Takéo Province	8	Nob Lean
Takéo Province	8	Chhim Tep
Takéo Province	8	Ith Sokun
Takéo Province	8	Kem Sokha
Total	120	

Source: National Assembly of Cambodia (in Khmer)
