= Kampong Cham (National Assembly constituency) =

- Constituency for the National Assembly
- Province: Kampong Cham
- Population: 928,694
- Electorate: 576,550

Current constituency
- Created: 1993
- Seats: 10
- Members: Yim Chhaily; Hun Neng; Khieu Kanharith; Hang Chuon Naron; Veng Sakhon; Pan Sorasak; Lun Lim Thai; Lou Kim Chhun; Nguon Socheat; Nguon Sim An

Kampong Cham Province (Khmer: មណ្ឌលខេត្តកំពង់ចាម) is one of the 25 constituencies of the National Assembly of Cambodia. It is allocated 10 seats in the National Assembly.

== MPs ==
Election	MP (Party)	MP (Party)	MP (Party)	MP (Party)	MP (Party)	MP (Party)	MP (Party)	MP (Party)	MP (Party)	MP (Party)	MP (Party)	MP (Party)	MP (Party)	MP (Party)	MP (Party)	MP (Party)	MP (Party)	MP (Party)
1993	Hun Sen (CPP)	Math Ly (CPP)	Chhor Leang Huot (CPP)	Keat Chhon (CPP)	Dith Munty (CPP)	Im Sothy (CPP)	Sar Sa Ath (BLDP)	Ros Roeun (MOULINAKA)	Norodom Sirivudh (FUNCINPEC)	Chhim Siek Leng (FUNCINPEC)	You Hockry (FUNCINPEC)	Nuon Nynara (FUNCINPEC)	Loy Sim Chheang (FUNCINPEC)	Monh Saphan (FUNCINPEC)	Tao Senghour (FUNCINPEC)	Sen Slaymann (FUNCINPEC)	Khun Phinub (FUNCINPEC)	Por Bunsry (FUNCINPEC)
1998	Heng Samrin (CPP)	Math Ly (CPP)	Chhor Leang Huot (CPP)	Hor Namhong (CPP)	Yos Son (CPP)	Im Run (CPP)	Chin Kimsreng (CPP)	Hor Sopheap (Rainsy)	Sam Rainsy (Rainsy)	Lim Sokun (Rainsy)	You Hockry (FUNCINPEC)	Norodom Ranariddh (FUNCINPEC)	Ismail Yusoh (FUNCINPEC)	Monh Saphan (FUNCINPEC)	Ek Vandy (FUNCINPEC)	Khim Chamroeun (FUNCINPEC)	Khun Phinub (FUNCINPEC)	Oak Socheat (FUNCINPEC)
2003	Heng Samrin (CPP)	Math Ly (CPP)	Chhor Leang Huot (CPP)	Hor Namhong (CPP)	Yos Son (CPP)	Khieu Kanharith (CPP)	Im Sothy (CPP)	Ith Prang (CPP)	Sam Rainsy (Rainsy)	Mao Monyvann (Rainsy)	You Hockry (FUNCINPEC)	Norodom Ranariddh (FUNCINPEC)	Thak Lany (Rainsy)	Monh Saphan (FUNCINPEC)	Cheam Channy (Rainsy)	Amath Yashya (Rainsy)	Chhim Siek Leng (FUNCINPEC)	Kong Vibol (FUNCINPEC)
2008	Heng Samrin (CPP)	Nguon Sim An (CPP)	Chem Savay (CPP)	Hor Namhong (CPP)	Yos Son (CPP)	Chay Borin (CPP)	Van Sengly (CPP)	Im Run (CPP)	Sam Rainsy (Rainsy)	Mao Monyvann (Rainsy)	You Hockry (FUNCINPEC)	Chin Kimsreng (CPP)	Thak Lany (Rainsy)	Van Sengly (CPP)	Cheam Channy (Rainsy)	Khek Sam On (CPP)	Kimsour Phirith (Rainsy)	Kem Sokha (HRP)
2013	Heng Samrin (CPP)	Nguon Sim An (CPP)	Chem Savay (CPP)	Hor Namhong (CPP)	Hun Neng (CPP)	Chay Borin (CPP)	Im Sothy (CPP)	Men Kon (CPP)	Vann Narith (Rainsy)	Mao Monyvann (Rainsy)	Kuoy Bunroeun (Rainsy)	Tuon Yokda (Rainsy)	Ouch Serey Yuth (Rainsy)	Nhay Chamroeun (Rainsy)	Chiv Cata (Rainsy)	Kong Kimhak (Rainsy)	Kimsour Phirith (Rainsy)	Kem Sokha (HRP)
2018	Khieu Kanharith (CPP)	Nguon Sim An (CPP)	Yim Chhaily (CPP)	Hang Chuon Naron (CPP)	Hun Neng (CPP)	Veng Sakhon (CPP)	Pan Sorasak (CPP)	Lun Lim Thai (CPP)	Lou Kim Chhun (CPP)	Nguon Socheat (CPP)	10 seats							

== Election results ==
Party	Votes	%	Seats	+/–
Cambodian People's Party	305,557	72.92	10	+2
FUNCINPEC	27,418	6.54	0	0
League for Democracy Party	20,266	4.84	0	0
Khmer Will Party	16,009	3.82	0	New
Cambodian Nationality Party	7,044	1.68	0	0
Beehive Social Democratic Party	5,283	1.26	0	New
Grassroots Democracy Party	4,970	1.19	0	New
Khmer Republican Party	4,784	1.14	0	New
Khmer National United Party	4,671	1.11	0	New
Khmer United Party	3,763	0.90	0	New
Khmer Economic Development Party	3,358	0.80	0	0
Dharmacracy Party	3,275	0.78	0	New
Khmer Rise Party	3,012	0.72	0	New
Cambodian Youth Party	2,913	0.70	0	New
Khmer Anti-Poverty Party	2,688	0.64	0	0
Ponleu Thmey Party	1,401	0.33	0	New
Cambodian Indigenous Democracy Party	1,388	0.33	0	New
Democratic Republican Party	650	0.16	0	0
Reaksmey Khemara Party	574	0.14	0	New
Invalid/blank votes	51,483	–	–	–
Total	470,507	100	10	–8
Registered voters/turnout	576,550	81.61	–	–
Source: National Election Committee
