= Cabinet of Hun Sen =

Government of Cambodia from 1998 to 2023

- 2nd, 3rd, 4th, 5th and 6th Cabinet of Cambodia
- 1998–2023
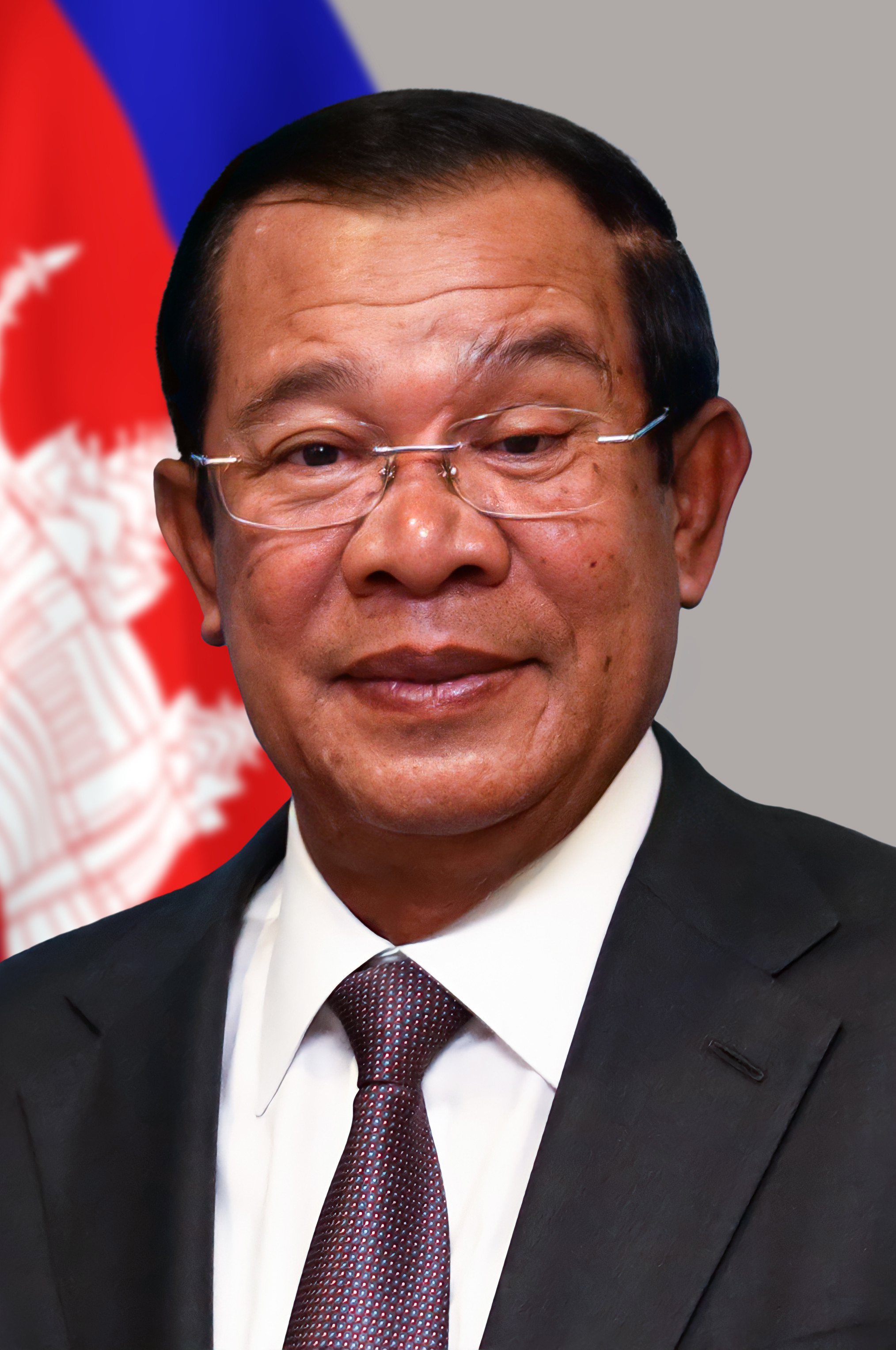
- Date formed: 30 November 1998
- Date dissolved: 22 August 2023

People and organisations
- Monarch: Norodom Sihanouk (until 2004); Norodom Sihamoni (since 2004)
- Prime Minister: Hun Sen
- Deputy Prime Minister: Sar Kheng; Hor Namhong; Tea Banh; Bin Chhin; Yim Chhaily; Men Sam An; Ke Kim Yan; Prak Sokhonn; Aun Pornmoniroth; Chea Sophara
- Member party: Cambodian People's Party
- Status in legislature: Majority coalition (1998–2017); Total control (2017–2023)
- Opposition party: Cambodian National Rescue Party (22 January 2015 – 31 January 2017; officially banned on 16 November 2017)
- Opposition leader: Sam Rainsy (22 January 2015 – 16 November 2015); Kem Sokha (16 November 2015 – 31 January 2017)

History
- Elections: 1998 Cambodian general election 2003 Cambodian general election 2008 Cambodian general election 2013 Cambodian general election 2018 Cambodian general election
- Legislature terms: 2nd National Assembly of Cambodia; 3rd National Assembly of Cambodia; 4th National Assembly of Cambodia; 5th National Assembly of Cambodia; 6th National Assembly of Cambodia
- Advice and consent: Senate
- Successor: Cabinet of Hun Manet

Members of the sixth Cabinet of Cambodia (Khmer: គណៈរដ្ឋមន្ត្រីអាណត្តិទី៦) were sworn in on 9 September 2018. Hun Sen assumed office as the sole prime minister of Cambodia on 30 November 1998, serving for five terms until 22 August 2023. All of the Cabinet ministers were from the Cambodian People's Party.

Members of the Cabinet are nominated by the Prime Minister and formally appointed by the King of Cambodia.

== Cabinet (2018-2023) ==
Cabinet members
Portfolio	Minister	Took office	Left office	Party
Prime Minister	Hun Sen	6 September 2018	22 August 2023	CPP
Permanent Deputy Prime Minister; Minister of the Office of the Council of Ministers	Bin Chhin	6 September 2018	22 August 2023	CPP
Deputy Prime Minister; Minister of Economy and Finance	Aun Pornmoniroth	6 September 2018	22 August 2023	CPP
Deputy Prime Minister; Minister of Foreign Affairs and International Cooperation	Prak Sokhonn	6 September 2018	22 August 2023	CPP
Deputy Prime Minister; Minister of Interior	Sar Kheng	6 September 2018	22 August 2023	CPP
Deputy Prime Minister; Minister of Land Management, Urban Planning and Construction	Chea Sophara	6 September 2018	22 August 2023	CPP
Deputy Prime Minister; Minister of National Assembly–SenateRelations and Inspection	Men Sam An	6 September 2018	22 August 2023	CPP
Deputy Prime Minister; Minister of National Defence	Tea Banh	6 September 2018	22 August 2023	CPP
Deputy Prime Minister	Hor Namhong	6 September 2018	22 August 2023	CPP
Deputy Prime Minister	Yim Chhaily	6 September 2018	22 August 2023	CPP
Deputy Prime Minister	Ke Kim Yan	6 September 2018	22 August 2023	CPP
Minister of Agriculture, Forestry and Fisheries	Veng Sakhon	6 September 2018	8 October 2022	CPP
Minister of Agriculture, Forestry and Fisheries	Dith Tina	14 October 2022	22 August 2023	CPP
Minister of Civil Service	Pich Bunthin	6 September 2018	30 March 2020	CPP
Minister of Civil Service	Prum Sokha	30 March 2020	22 August 2023	CPP
Minister of Commerce	Pan Sorasak	6 September 2018	22 August 2023	CPP
Minister of Cults and Religion	Him Chhem	6 September 2018	30 March 2020	CPP
Minister of Cults and Religion	Chhit Sokhon	30 March 2020	22 August 2023	CPP
Minister of Culture and Fine Arts	Phoeurng Sackona	6 September 2018	22 August 2023	CPP
Minister of Education, Youth and Sport	Hang Chuon Naron	6 September 2018	22 August 2023	CPP
Minister of Environment	Say Sam Al	6 September 2018	22 August 2023	CPP
Minister of Health	Mam Bunheng	6 September 2018	22 August 2023	CPP
Minister of Industry, Science, Technology and Innovation (Note: Minister of Industry and Handicrafts from September 2018to March 2020.)	Cham Prasidh	6 September 2018	22 August 2023	CPP
Minister of Information	Khieu Kanharith	6 September 2018	22 August 2023	CPP
Minister of Justice	Ang Vong Vathana	6 September 2018	30 March 2020	CPP
Minister of Justice	Keut Rith	30 March 2020	22 August 2023	CPP
Minister of Labour and Vocational Training	Ith Sam Heng	6 September 2018	22 August 2023	CPP
Minister of Mines and Energy	Suy Sem	6 September 2018	22 August 2023	CPP
Minister of Planning	Chhay Than	6 September 2018	22 August 2023	CPP
Minister of Posts and Telecommunications	Tram Iv Tek	6 September 2018	30 March 2020	CPP
Minister of Posts and Telecommunications	Chea Vandeth	30 March 2020	22 August 2023	CPP
Minister of Public Works and Transport	Sun Chanthol	6 September 2018	22 August 2023	CPP
Minister of Rural Development	Ouk Rabun	6 September 2018	22 August 2023	CPP
Minister of Social Affairs, Veterans and Youth Rehabilitation	Vong Soth	6 September 2018	22 August 2023	CPP
Minister of Tourism	Thong Khon	6 September 2018	22 August 2023	CPP
Minister of Water Resources and Meteorology	Lim Kean Hor	6 September 2018	22 August 2023	CPP
Minister of Women's Affairs	Ing Kantha Phavi	6 September 2018	22 August 2023	CPP
Secretary of State for Civil Aviation	Mao Havannall	6 September 2018	22 August 2023	CPP

== See also ==
- Prime Minister of Cambodia
- King of Cambodia
