= Prey Veng (constituency) =

- National Assembly constituency
- Province: Prey Veng
- Population: 1,176,720
- Electorate: 661,042
- Major settlements: Prey Veng

Current constituency
- Created: 1993
- Seats: 11
- Member(s): Cheam Yeab; He Bavy; Kong Salon; Long Bunny; Mom Sibon; Nhim Vanda; Pen Panha; Pov Samy; Prom Sokha; Sbong Sarath; Sor Sokha

Prey Veng Province (Khmer: មណ្ឌលខេត្តព្រៃវែង) is one of the 25 constituencies of the National Assembly of Cambodia. It is allocated 11 seats in the National Assembly.

== MPs ==
Election	MP (Party)	MP (Party)	MP (Party)	MP (Party)	MP (Party)	MP (Party)	MP (Party)	MP (Party)	MP (Party)	MP (Party)	MP (Party)
1993	Pen Panha (CPP)	Cheam Yeab (CPP)	Min Sean (CPP)	Ek Sam Ol (CPP)	Vann Sunheng (CPP)	Bin Chhin (CPP)	Ieng Mouly (BLDP)	Khin Khean (FUNCINPEC)	Men Sam Ean (FUNCINPEC)	Ros Hean (FUNCINPEC)	Veng Sereyvuth (FUNCINPEC)
1998	Pen Panha (CPP)	Cheam Yeab (CPP)	Min Sean (CPP)	Ek Sam Ol (CPP)	Vann Sunheng (CPP)	Nhim Vanda (CPP)	Chea Soth (CPP)	Sisowath Sanha (CPP)	Sok San (FUNCINPEC)	Kouch Ky (FUNCINPEC)	Veng Sereyvuth (FUNCINPEC)
2003	Pen Panha (CPP)	Cheam Yeab (CPP)	Min Sean (CPP)	Ek Sam Ol (CPP)	Chea Poch (Rainsy)	Nhim Vanda (CPP)	Chea Soth (CPP)	Sisowath Sanha (CPP)	Khem Veasna (Rainsy)	Kouch Ky (FUNCINPEC)	Veng Sereyvuth (FUNCINPEC)
2008	Pen Panha (CPP)	Cheam Yeab (CPP)	Min Sean (CPP)	Sok Eysan (CPP)	Chea Poch (Rainsy)	Nhim Vanda (CPP)	Bin Chhin (CPP)	Long Sakhan (CPP)	Kong Bora (Rainsy)	Yem Ponhearith (HRP)/ (Rainsy)	Sao Rany (NRP)
2013	Pen Panha (CPP)	Cheam Yeab (CPP)	Long Bunny (CPP)	Sok Eysan (CPP)	Sar Sokha (CPP)	Heng Danaro (Rainsy)	Bin Chhin (CPP)	Tout Khoeuth (Rainsy)	Kong Bora (Rainsy)	Yem Ponhearith (HRP)/ (Rainsy)	Lat Lithey (Rainsy)
2018	Pen Panha (CPP)	Cheam Yeab (CPP)	Long Bunny (CPP)	Prum Sokha (CPP)	Sar Sokha (CPP)	Mom Sibun (CPP)	He Bavy (CPP)	Sborng Sarath (CPP)	Kong Salorn (CPP)	Pov Samy (CPP)	Nhim Vanda (CPP)

== Election results ==
Party	Votes	%	Seats	+/–
Cambodian People's Party	368,729	75.30	11	+5
League for Democracy Party	31,439	6.42	0	0
FUNCINPEC	27,028	5.52	0	0
Khmer Will Party	15,199	3.10	0	New
Beehive Social Democratic Party	9,275	1.89	0	New
Khmer National United Party	6,387	1.30	0	New
Cambodian Nationality Party	6,357	1.30	0	0
Khmer United Party	4,599	0.94	0	New
Khmer Anti-Poverty Party	4,527	0.92	0	0
Grassroots Democracy Party	4,490	0.92	0	New
Dharmacracy Party	3,946	0.81	0	New
Cambodian Youth Party	3,066	0.63	0	New
Our Motherland Party	2,234	0.46	0	0
Ponleu Thmey Party	1,340	0.27	0	New
Khmer Republican Party	1,074	0.22	0	New
Invalid/blank votes	52,795	–	–	–
Total	542,485	100	11	0
Registered voters/turnout	661,042	82.07	–	–
Source: National Election Committee
