= Takéo (National Assembly constituency) =

Constituency in Cambodia

- National Assembly constituency
- Province: Takéo
- Population: 900,914

Current constituency
- Created: 1993
- Seats: 8
- Member(s): Bin Chhin; Chan Sarun; Chea Vandeth; Mok Mareth; Nin Saphon; Sok Pheng; Sok Sokan; Sou Phirin

Takéo (Khmer: តាកែវ) is one of the 25 constituencies of the National Assembly of Cambodia. It is allocated 8 seats in the National Assembly.

== MPs ==
Election	MP (Party)	MP (Party)	MP (Party)	MP (Party)	MP (Party)	MP (Party)	MP (Party)	MP (Party)
1993	Nin Saphon (CPP)	Sok An (CPP)	So Khun (CPP)	Tep Nunry (FUNCINPEC)	Nob Lean (FUNCINPEC)	Chhim Tep (FUNCINPEC)	Ith Sokun (FUNCINPEC)	Kem Sokha (BLDP)
1998	Nin Saphon (CPP)	Sok An (CPP)	Prak Thuch (CPP)	Chao Sophon (CPP)	Hean Vanroth (FUNCINPEC)	Khek Vandy (FUNCINPEC)	Lor Sary (FUNCINPEC)	Hong Sokheng (Rainsy)
2003	Nin Saphon (CPP)	Sok An (CPP)	So Khun (CPP)	Mok Mareth (CPP)	Chan Sarun (CPP)	Khek Vandy (FUNCINPEC)	Keo Saphal (FUNCINPEC)	Kuoy Bunroeun (Rainsy)
2008	Nin Saphon (CPP)	Sok An (CPP)	Prak Thuch (CPP)	Chau Sophon (CPP)	Yean Hunly (CPP)	Um Sokhan (CPP)	Tok Vanchan (Rainsy)	Kuoy Bunroeun (Rainsy)
2013	Nin Saphon (CPP)	Sok An (CPP)	Mok Mareth (CPP)	So Khun (CPP)	Pol Hom (CNRP)	Khy Vandeth (CNRP)	Ou Chanrath (CNRP)	Tep Sothy (CNRP)
2018	Nin Saphon (CPP)	Bin Chhin (CPP)	Mok Mareth (CPP)	Sok Sokhan (CPP)	Chea Vandeth (CPP)	Sou Phirin (CPP)	Chan Sarun (CPP)	Sok Pheng (CPP)
