= Siem Reap (National Assembly constituency) =

Cambodian National Assembly constituency

- Constituency for the National Assembly of Cambodia
- Province: Siem Reap Province
- Population: 1,014,234

Current constituency
- Created: 1993
- Seats: 6
- Members: Tea Banh; Seang Nam; Chhim Ma; Peou Savoeun; Nou Phalla; Yin Kimsean

Siem Reap (Khmer: សៀមរាប) is one of the 25 constituencies of the National Assembly of Cambodia. It is allocated 6 seats in the National Assembly.

== MPs ==
Election	MP (Party)	MP (Party)	MP (Party)	MP (Party)	MP (Party)	MP (Party)
1993	Tea Banh (CPP)	Long Hib (CPP)	Sam Rainsy (FUNCINPEC)	Kieng Vang (FUNCINPEC)	Hem Bunheng (FUNCINPEC)	Son Chhay (BLDP)
1998	Tea Banh (CPP)	Sieng Nam (CPP)	Norodom Vichara (FUNCINPEC)	Khin Khean (FUNCINPEC)	Hong Tuhay (CPP)	Son Chhay (Rainsy)
2003	Tea Banh (CPP)	Sieng Nam (CPP)	Pou Sohtireak (FUNCINPEC)	Cham Prasidh (CPP)	Keo Saphal (CPP)	Ke Sovannaroth (Rainsy)
2008	Tea Banh (CPP)	Sieng Nam (CPP)	Sam Heang (CPP)	Chhim Ma (CPP)	Peou Savoeun (CPP)	Ke Sovannaroth (Rainsy)
2013	Tea Banh (CPP)	Sieng Nam (CPP)	Oum Saman (Rainsy)	Chhim Ma (CPP)	Peou Savoeun (CPP)	Ke Sovannaroth (Rainsy)
2018	Tea Banh (CPP)	Sieng Nam (CPP)	Yin Kimsean (CPP)	Chhim Ma (CPP)	Nou Phalla (CPP)	Sam Heang (CPP)
