= Kampong Speu (National Assembly constituency) =

- Constituency for the National Assembly of Cambodia
- Province: Kampong Speu
- Population: 788,938
- Electorate: 503,483

Current constituency
- Created: 1993
- Seats: 6
- Members: Chhay Than; Hun Many; Satya Vuth; Sok Born; Kheng Somvada; Rin Virak

Kampong Speu (Khmer: មណ្ឌលខេត្តកំពង់ស្ពឺ) is one of the 25 constituencies of the National Assembly of Cambodia. It is allocated 6 seats in the National Assembly.

== MPs ==
Election	MP (Party)	MP (Party)	MP (Party)	MP (Party)	MP (Party)	MP (Party)
1993	Hem Khan (CPP)	Samrith Pech (CPP)	Say Chhum (CPP)	Mam Samy (FUNCINPEC)	Pen Thol (BLDP)	Ros Chheng (FUNCINPEC)
1998	Hem Khan (CPP)	Samrith Pech (CPP)	Say Chhum (CPP)	Kim San (FUNCINPEC)	Ly Son (CPP)	Thach Sang (FUNCINPEC)
2003	Hem Khan (CPP)	Samrith Pech (CPP)	Say Chhum (CPP)	Lu Laysreng (FUNCINPEC)	Ly Son (CPP)	Nuth Rumduol (SRP)
2008	Hem Khan (CPP)	Samrith Pech (CPP)	Say Chhum (CPP)	Im Savoeun (CPP)	Ly Son (CPP)	Nuth Rumduol (SRP)
2013	Hem Khorn (CPP)	Hun Many (CPP)	Korng Heang (CPP)	Pen Sovan (CNRP)	Sok Oumsea (CNRP)	Nuth Rumduol (SRP)
2018	Chhay Than (CPP)	Hun Many (CPP)	Kheng Somvada (CPP)	Rin Virak (CPP)	Satya Vuth (CPP)	Sok Born (CPP)

== Election results ==
Party	Votes	%	Seats	+/–
Cambodian People's Party	338,102	79.64	6	+3
League for Democracy Party	19,542	4.60	0	0
FUNCINPEC	16,335	3.85	0	0
Khmer Will Party	13,913	3.28	0	New
Beehive Social Democratic Party	5,524	1.30	0	New
Khmer National United Party	5,480	1.29	0	New
Grassroots Democracy Party	4,203	0.99	0	New
Khmer Anti-Poverty Party	3,784	0.89	0	0
Khmer United Party	2,934	0.69	0	New
Dharmacracy Party	2,803	0.66	0	New
Cambodian Youth Party	2,335	0.55	0	New
Khmer Rise Party	2,301	0.54	0	New
Cambodian Nationality Party	1,945	0.46	0	0
Our Motherland Party	1,665	0.39	0	New
Khmer Economic Development Party	1,647	0.39	0	0
Ponleu Thmey Party	810	0.19	0	New
Reaksmey Khemara Party	613	0.14	0	New
Democratic Republican Party	606	0.14	0	New
Invalid/blank votes	26,011	–	–	–
Total	450,553	100	6	0
Registered voters/turnout	503,483	89.49	–	–
Source: National Election Committee
