= Preah Vihear (National Assembly constituency) =

- Constituency for the National Assembly of Cambodia
- Province: Preah Vihear Province
- Population: 254,827

Current constituency
- Created: 1993
- Seats: 1
- Members: Suos Yara

Preah Vihear (Khmer: ព្រះវិហារ) is one of the 25 constituencies of the National Assembly of Cambodia. It is allocated 1 seat in the National Assembly.

== MPs ==
Election	MP (Party)
1993	Suk Sam Eng (CPP)
1998	Suk Sam Eng (CPP)
2003	Suk Sam Eng (CPP)
2008	Suk Sam Eng (CPP)
2013	Suos Yara (CPP)
2018	Suos Yara (CPP)
