= Svay Rieng (National Assembly constituency) =

- Constituency for the National Assembly of Cambodia
- Province: Svay Rieng Province
- Population: 525,497

Current constituency
- Created: 1993
- Seats: 5
- Members: Men Sam An; Duong Vanna; Chey Son; Chhun Sarim; Pov Sopheap

Ratanakiri (Khmer: ស្វាយរៀង) is one of the 25 constituencies of the National Assembly of Cambodia. It is allocated 5 seats in the National Assembly.

== MPs ==
Election	MP (Party)	MP (Party)	MP (Party)	MP (Party)	MP (Party)
1993	Men Sam An (CPP)	Chem Sguon (CPP)	Him Chhem (CPP)	Ung Phan (FUNCINPEC)	Srey Mondul (FUNCINPEC)
1998	Men Sam An (CPP)	Chem Sguon (CPP)	Him Chhem (CPP)	Lek Donal (FUNCINPEC)	Hul Savorn (CPP)
2003	Men Sam An (CPP)	Duong Vanna (CPP)	Him Chhem (CPP)	Khun Haing (FUNCINPEC)	Hul Savorn (CPP)
2008	Men Sam An (CPP)	Duong Vanna (CPP)	Sao Leng (CPP)	Chun Sarim (CPP)	Hul Savorn (CPP)
2013	Men Sam An (CPP)	Duong Vanna (CPP)	Riel Khemarin (CNRP)	Kong Saphea (CNRP)	Hul Savorn (CPP)
2018	Men Sam An (CPP)	Duong Vanna (CPP)	Chey Son (CPP)	Chun Sarim (CPP)	Pov Sopheap (CPP)
