= Bayap Zoo =

- Interactive map of Bayap Zoo
- 11.651178°N 105.482871°E
- Date opened: 1995
- Location: Kamchay Mear District, Cambodia
- Owner: Nhim Vanda

Bayap Zoo is a zoo located in the Kamchay Mear District of Prey Veng Province, in Cambodia.

== History ==
The zoo was established in 1995, by Senator Nhim Vanda, who as of 2014 owned it, and also the Kampot Zoo in Kampot city of southern Cambodia.

The Bayap Zoo was destroyed by flood in 2010–2011, and was renovated and reopened.

== Criticism ==
The zoo has been accused of keeping its animals in poor conditions, and the organization Zoo Watch has called for it to be shut down. Vanda has denied that animals were being mistreated, saying conditions have improved.
