= Kratié (National Assembly constituency) =

- National Assembly constituency
- Province: Kratié
- Population: 592,845

Current constituency
- Created: 1993
- Seats: 3
- Member(s): Pich Bunthin; Sar Chamrong; Troeung Thavy

Kratié Province (Khmer: ខេត្តក្រចេះ) is one of the 6 constituencies of the National Assembly of Cambodia. It is allocated 3 seats in the National Assembly.

== MPs ==
Election	MP (Party)	MP (Party)	MP (Party)
1993	Chhea Thang (CPP)	Soth Soy (FUNCINPEC)	Ven Sokhoy (FUNCINPEC)
1998	Nuth Narang (CPP)	Huot Pongly (FUNCINPEC)	Norodom Diyat (FUNCINPEC)
2003	Chhan Saphan (CPP)	Im Chhun Lim (CPP)	Norodom Rattana Devi (FUNCINPEC)
2008	Katoe Toyab (CPP)	Troeung Thavy (CPP)	Long Ry (SRP)
2013	Sun Saphoeun (CPP)	Troeung Thavy (CPP)	Keo Phirom (CNRP)
2018	Pich Bunthin (CPP)	Troeung Thavy (CPP)	Sar Chamrong (CPP)
