= Pailin (National Assembly constituency) =

Cambodian National Assembly constituency

- Constituency for the National Assembly of Cambodia
- Province: Pailin Province
- Population: 75,112

Current constituency
- Created: 1993
- Seats: 1
- Members: Ban Sreymom

Pailin (Khmer: ប៉ៃលិន) is one of the 25 constituencies of the National Assembly of Cambodia. It is allocated 1 seat in the National Assembly.

== MPs ==
Election	MP (Party)
1998	Sun Kimhun (Rainsy)
2003	Y Chhean (CPP)
2008	Ich Sarou (CPP)
2013	Ban Sreymom (CPP)
2018	Ban Sreymom (CPP)
