= Yem Ponhearith =

Cambodian politician

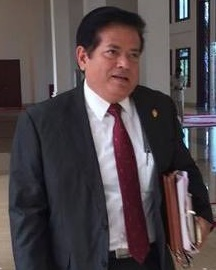

Member of Parliament for Prey Veng
- In office 24 September 2008 – 16 November 2017
- Majority: 36,089 (6.3%)

Chairman of the Parliamentary Commission on Education
- In office 27 August 2014 – 16 November 2017
- Preceded by: Mom Chim Huy

Personal details
- Born: 7 July 1960 (age 65) Kiri Vong, Takéo, Cambodia
- Party: Cambodia National Rescue Party (2012–17); Human Rights Party (2007–2012)

Yem Ponhearith (Khmer: យ៉ែម បុញ្ញឫទ្ធិ; born 7 July 1960) is a Cambodian politician and was elected a Member of Parliament for Prey Veng in 2008. He is the Chairman of the Commission on Education, Youth, Sport, Religious Affairs, Culture and Tourism.

In 2018 police and officials from the Phnom Penh Culture Department seized copies of two books by Ponhearith - Human Value and, Vision to National Reconciliation and Social Arrangement. The books were published in France. According to the director of the culture department, Ponhearith had not obtained the required license for the book to be published.
