= Kampot Zoo =

Zoo in Cambodia

Teuk Chhou Zoo
- Interactive map of Teuk Chhou Zoo
- Date opened: 2000
- Date closed: 2016
- Location: Tuek Chhou, Kampot, Cambodia
- Land area: 23 hectares
- No. of animals: 150
- No. of species: 52
- Owner: Nhim Vanda

Kampot Zoo (Teuk Chhou Waterfall Crop Garden and Zoo) is about 10 km from the provincial town of Kampot, Cambodia. The Zoo was established in 1999, and opened in 2000 by senator Nhim Vanda, who as of 2014 owned it and Bayap Zoo in Prey Veng Province’s Kamchay Mear District.

Spanning over 23 hectares, it is the second-largest zoo in Cambodia.

In 2006 the Zoo housed over 150 animals of 52 species, and added four hippopotamuses, four zebras and several ostriches .

In 2011, Kampot Zoo cooperated with Phnom Tamao Wildlife Rescue Centre to improve animal facilities and work routines in the Zoo. An article published in 2011 talking about the poor condition of the animals at the zoo prompted a couple of Australian expats to invest in the facilities of the park under an NGO called footprint. The cooperation between Kampot Zoo and Footprint came to an end in 2012, only one year after the start of the cooperation.

== Controversies ==
The zoo has been criticized many times for the poor condition in which the animal live.

One of the first public report on the situation in the zoo was published in the Phnom Penh Post in 2011, where the journalist pointed the state in which the animal lived, with habitat or cages that were too small, skinny and sick animals, feces on the ground and not enough food. In the article, the owner of the zoo blames NGO and the government for not giving him money to run its operations. The article sparked outrage in the zoological community and many NGO, individuals and companies started getting involved to help the zoo. Another article in the Phnomh Penh Post even stated in 2012 that the zoo was in a better state.

The owner had given the management of the zoo to the NGO Footprint in 2012, an NGO created by a couple of Australian expat living in Cambodia. Footprint was created for the sole purpose of helping the zoo. Footprint was financing the baseline operation, renovating enclosures and caring for the animals, and Wildlife Alliance provided healthcare for the animals. The situation was getting better, and many media praised the new orientation of the zoo. But division between in the orientation for the park between the owner and the NGO after a dispute on an unknown subject broke the partnership.

In autumn 2015, many ONG invested in animal care and rehabilitation un South-East Asia raises concerns when the zoo announced they were swapping their two elephants for endangered white tigers from the Japanese Hirakawa Zoo. The two elephants were still under the care of EARS Asia, a conservation group based in Hong Kong who paid for the elephants enclosure, the food, and the employee who cared for them. The direction of the zoo decided to expulse EARS and its employees from its premises. The NGO relitaliated by creating a campaign to urge the government to stop the exchange. NGOs from both South-East Asia (EARS Asia, Footprint, Wildlife Alliance) and from Japan (Voice for Zoos Animals) condemned the exchange, stating the elephants would suffer in their new enclosure. The NGOs questioned the motive behind the exchange, stating there was no conservation value to it. The Cambodia Wildlife Sanctuary offered to take the pair of elephant to give them a chance to be released, but the owner of the zoo refused the offer. The swapping was finally canceled in April 2016.

EARS Asia launched the Zoo-Watch initiative in 2016 to urge the government of Cambodia to close both Kampot zoo and Bayap Zoo, both owned by the same owner. Reports from both the NGO and media stated that the animals were still living in subpar or even dangerous conditions.
