= Saphon =

The name Saphon can refer to either:

- Nin Saphon, a Cambodian politician.
- Saphon, an Ugaritic name for Jebel Aqra or its summit.
