= Prangley =

Prangley is a surname. Notable people with the surname include:

- David Ryder Prangley, musician with the glam punk band Rachel Stamp and as bass player for Adam Ant
- Gerard A. Prangley, one of the two casualties in the Star Canopus diving accident in 1978
- Trevor Prangley (born 1972), South African mixed martial artist

== See also ==
- Shark Fights 13: Jardine vs. Prangley or Shark Fights, mixed martial arts promotion based in Amarillo, Texas
- Prang (disambiguation)
