= Vongsey Vissoth =

Cambodian politician and economist (born 1965)

His Excellency Vongsey Vissoth
- វង្សី វិស្សុត
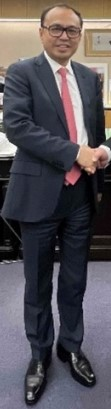

Permanent Deputy Prime Minister of Cambodia
- Incumbent
- Assumed office 22 August 2023
- Prime Minister: Hun Manet
- Serving with: Sok Chenda Sophea; Koeut Rith; Tea Seiha; Sar Sokha; Say Sam Al; Hang Chuon Naron; Sun Chanthol; Neth Savoeun; Aun Pornmoniroth

Minister in charge of the Office of the Council of Ministers
- Incumbent
- Assumed office 22 August 2023
- Prime Minister: Hun Manet
- Preceded by: Bin Chhin

Personal details
- Born: 18 February 1965 (age 61)
- Party: Cambodian People's Party
- Education: Moscow State Institute of International Relations

Vongsey Vissoth (Khmer: វង្សី វិស្សុត, Vôngsei Vĭssŏt; born 18 February 1965) is a Cambodian politician and economist who is a deputy prime minister and the Minister in charge of the Office of the Council of Ministers.
