= Kampong Speu =

Kampong Speu may refer to:

- Kampong Speu Province, a central province of Cambodia
- Kampong Speu (town), the capital of Kampong Speu Province, now officially Chbar Mon District
- Kampong Speu (National Assembly constituency)
