= Prey Veng =

Prey Veng may refer to:

- Prey Veng Province, in Cambodia
- Prey Veng (city), capital of the province
- Prey Veng (National Assembly constituency)
