= Chhim Siek Leng =

Cambodian politician

Member of Parliament for Kampong Cham
- In office 25 November 1998 – 27 July 2008

Minister of Rural Development
- In office 1998–2001
- Prime Minister: Hun Sen

Governor of Phnom Penh
- In office 1993–1998
- Preceded by: Sim Ka
- Succeeded by: Chea Sophara

Personal details
- Born: 12 April 1940 (age 86) Kampong Cham, Cambodia
- Party: FUNCINPEC

Chhim Siek Leng (Khmer: ឈឹម សៀកឡេង, born 12 April 1940) is a Cambodian politician. He belongs to the Funcinpec party and was elected to represent Kampong Cham in the National Assembly of Cambodia in 2003. Leng was a close ally of then-party president Prince Norodom Ranariddh. In 2008, he was appointed as the President of the Norodom Ranariddh Party.
