= Khieu Kanharith =

Cambodian politician

His Excellency Khieu Kanharith MP
- ខៀវ កញ្ញារីទ្ធ
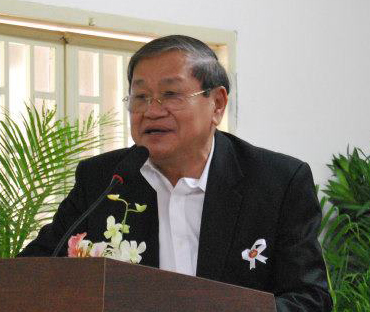
- Kanharith in 2012

Minister of Information
- In office 14 July 2004 – 22 August 2023
- Prime Minister: Hun Sen
- Preceded by: Lou Lay Sreng
- Succeeded by: Neth Pheaktra

Member of Parliament for Kampong Cham
- Incumbent
- Assumed office 5 September 2018
- In office 25 November 1998 – 27 July 2008

Member of Parliament for Phnom Penh
- In office 1993–1998

Member of Parliament for Kandal
- In office 1981–1993

Personal details
- Born: 13 September 1951 (age 75) Phnom Penh, Cambodia, French Indochina
- Party: Cambodian People's Party
- Spouse: Tep Rainsy
- Children: Khieu Tep Sathya
- Education: Royal University of Law and Economics
- Profession: Politician, editor, author

Khieu Kanharith (Khmer: ខៀវ កញ្ញារីទ្ធ, romanized: Khiaw Kănharoĕt; born 13 September 1951) is a Cambodian politician and former Minister of Information.

Kanharith was born in Phnom Penh to Khieu Than, who was a customs official and his wife Lor Lienghorn. In 1969 he completed his baccalauréat studies and was studying diplomacy and law when the country fell to the Khmer Rouge in 1975. In the early days of the People's Republic of Kampuchea, he began to work for the United Front for the National Salvation of Kampuchea, first as second assistant secretary-general to the Central Committee. He also taught at the Front's political training school. Kanharith began working for Kampuchea, the first Cambodian newspaper after the Pol Pot period and one of the most important newspapers throughout the 1980s, By August 1982 he was editor-in-chief. He was first elected to the National Assembly of Cambodia in 1981. In 1989 he was named to the National Council of the Solidarity Front for Development and Defense of Kampuchea. He was jailed briefly in 1990 for suspicion of dissident activities. Despite this, in 1991, Prime Minister Hun Sen asked him to serve as an advisor on the Council of Ministers. He also served on the Secretariat of the Supreme National Council, the body representing the four Cambodian factions which had signed the Paris Peace Agreements. During the period of the United Nations Transitional Authority in Cambodia (UNTAC), he became an official spokesman for the State of Cambodia. Following UNTAC, in May 1993, he was elected to the Constituent Council. He was made Minister of Information the same year. From 1994 to 2004 he held the lower rank of Secretary of State of the Ministry of Information, but it was widely recognized that he continued to be the most powerful figure in the ministry. He was once again elected to the National Assembly in 1998. He regained the title of Minister of Information in 2004. He was conferred an Honorary Doctoral Degree in Information and Communications from The University of Cambodia in 2011.

He is also an author and translator, and has produced an unauthorized Khmer language version of the James Clavell novel Shōgun, which he has had printed with his own money. He also translated Ben Kiernan's How Pol Pot Came to Power into Khmer.
