= Paññāsāstra University of Cambodia =

Private university in Cambodia

- សាកលវិទ្យាល័យបញ្ញាសាស្ត្រកម្ពុជា (Khmer)
- Motto: Sīla, Samādhi, Paññā (Pali)
- Motto in English: Morality, concentration, wisdom
- Type: Private
- Established: 1997; 29 years ago (opened 2000; 26 years ago)
- Chairman: Veng Sereyvuth
- Chancellor: Sam Angsam
- President: Kol Pheng
- Location: Phnom Penh, Cambodia
- Colors: Blue, Yellow, Red and White
- Website: www.puc.edu.kh

The Paññāsāstra University of Cambodia (Note: Khmer: សាកលវិទ្យាល័យបញ្ញាសាស្ត្រកម្ពុជា, UNGEGN: Sakâlôvĭtyéaloăy Bânhnhéasastr Kâmpŭchéa, ALA-LC: Sākalavidyālăy Paññāsastr Kambujā) (PUC) is a private university located in Phnom Penh, Cambodia. It was originally established in 1997, and opened in 2000. It provides an English-based education in all subjects, and is accredited by the Royal Government of Cambodia's Ministry of Education, Youth and Sports. This private university was established by the former Minister of Education, Youth and Sports, Dr. Kol Pheng.

== Faculties ==
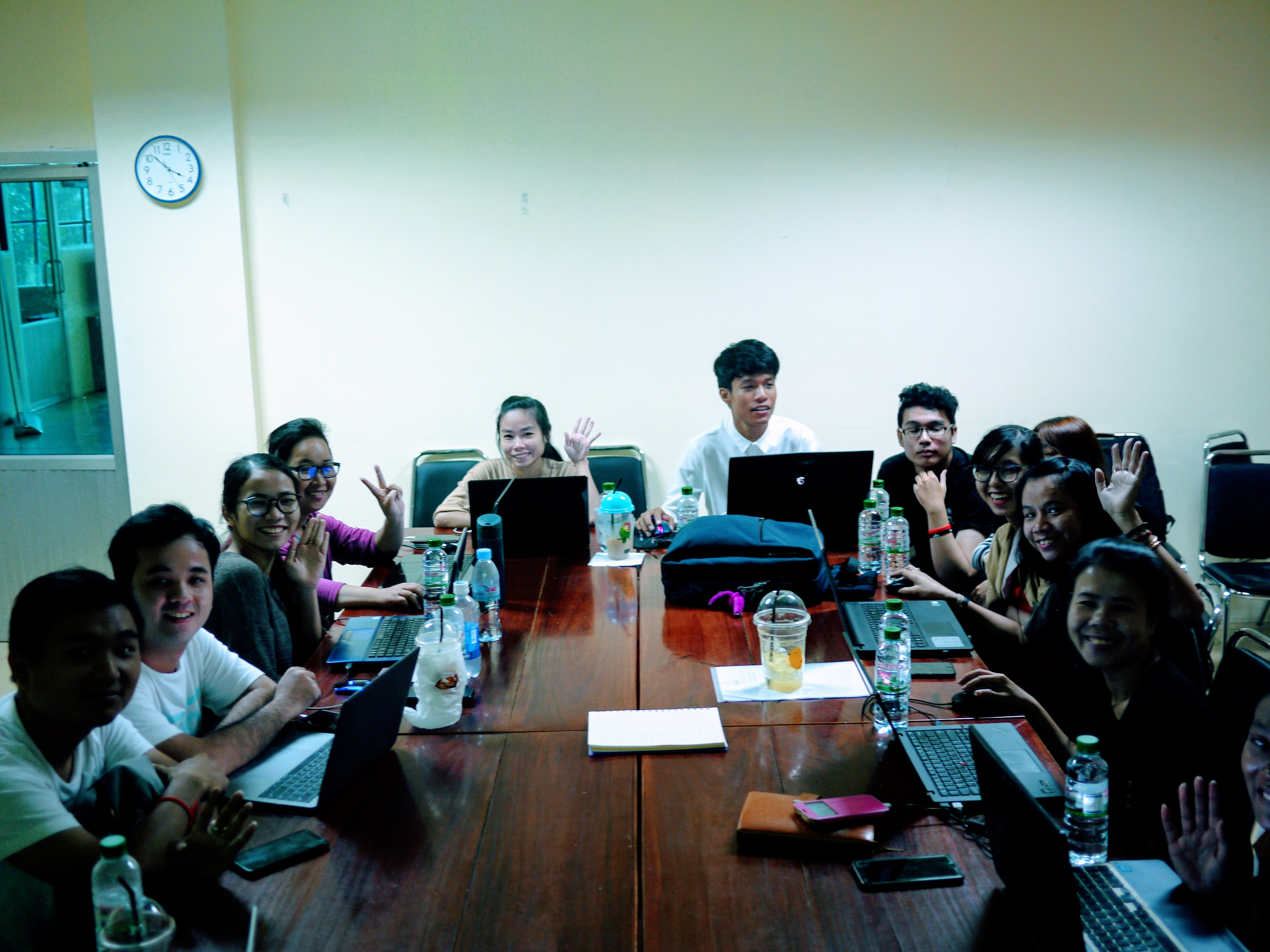
Wikipedia workshop at the Paññāsāstra University, September 2018

- Architecture & Design
- Arts, Letters, and Humanities
- Business and Economics
- Law & Public Affairs
- Education
- Mathematics, Sciences and Engineering
- Communication & Media Arts
- Social Sciences & International Relations
- Graduate School of Management & Economics

== See also ==
- Paññāsāstra International School
