= Prang =

Prang may refer to:

== Places ==
- Prang, Khyber Pakhtunkhwa, a town of Charsadda District, Khyber Pakhtunkhwa province, Pakistan
- Prang Besar, an old name for Putrajaya, Kuala Lumpur, Malayasia
- Prang Ghar Tehsil or Pran Ghar Subdivision, a subdivision of Pakistan
- Prang Ku District, a district in Sisaket Province, northeastern Thailand
- Bu Prang Camp, a former army camp in Vietnam
- Prang, Ghana, a settlement of Pru East District, Bono East Region, Ghana
- Prang, a tourist spot in Ganderbal district, Jammu and Kashmir, India

== Other uses ==
- Prang (album), 2026 studio album by A
- Prang (architecture), a type of South-East Asian temple spire
- Pranger, a type of German public humiliation device
- Prang language, spoken by the Kơho people in the region of Di Linh, Vietnam
- Prang, an art supply brand founded by Louis Prang and now owned by Dixon Ticonderoga
- an RAF slang term for an airplane crash
- an Australian, New Zealand and British slang for a minor traffic accident

== People with the surname ==
- Ernie Prang, a character in the Harry Potter stories
- Ith Prang (fl. 2003), Cambodian politician
- Louis Prang (1824–1909) American printer, lithographer, and "father of the Christmas card"
