= Yim Chhaily =

Cambodian politician

His Excellency Yim Chhaily MP
- យឹម ឆៃលី

Deputy Prime Minister of Cambodia
- In office 25 September 2008 – 22 August 2023
- Prime Minister: Hun Sen

Member of Parliament of Cambodia
- Incumbent
- Assumed office 5 September 2018
- Preceded by: Heng Samrin
- Constituency: Kampong Cham
- Majority: 278,139 (66.4%)
- In office 27 September 2003 – 29 July 2018
- Constituency: Banteay Meanchey
- Majority: 83,861 (32.8%)

Personal details
- Born: 1 January 1950 (age 76)
- Party: Cambodian People's Party
- Children: Yim Leang; Yim Chhay Lin
- Relatives: Hun Many (son-in-law)

Yim Chhaily (born 1 January 1950; also spelt Yim Chhay Ly) is a Cambodian politician. He belongs to Cambodian People's Party and was elected to represent Banteay Meanchey in the National Assembly of Cambodia in 2003.

== Personal life ==
Chhaily has several children, including Yim Leang, who is married to Chea Sophara's daughter Chea Sophamaden, and Yim Chhay Lin, who is married to Hun Sen's son Hun Many.
