= You Hockry =

Cambodian politician

Von Panharith

First Vice President of the National Assembly
- In office 8 December 2017 – 29 July 2018
- President: Heng Samrin
- Preceded by: Kem Sokha
- Succeeded by: Nguon Nhel

Member of Parliament for Kampong Cham
- In office 24 November 2017 – 29 July 2018
- In office 14 June 1993 – 28 July 2013

Minister of Interior
- In office 24 September 1993 – 16 July 2004; Served with Sar Kheng
- Prime Minister: Norodom Ranariddh; Hun Sen; Ung Huot

Personal details
- Born: 20 August 1944 (age 82) Kang Meas, Kampong Cham, Cambodia, French Indochina
- Party: Funcinpec Party (1993–2006; 2015–present); Norodom Ranariddh Party (2006–08)
- Education: Howard University; Royal University of Law and Economics

You Hockry (Khmer: យូ ហុកគ្រី, born 20 August 1944) is a Cambodian politician. He belongs to the Funcinpec party and was elected to represent Kampong Cham in the National Assembly of Cambodia in 2003.

He once served as the secretary-general of the Norodom Ranariddh Party.
