= Ly Son =

Cambodian politician

Ly Son (Khmer: លី សុន) is a Cambodian politician. He belongs to the Cambodian People's Party and was elected to represent Kampong Speu Province in the National Assembly of Cambodia in 2003.
