= Suy Sem =

Cambodian politician

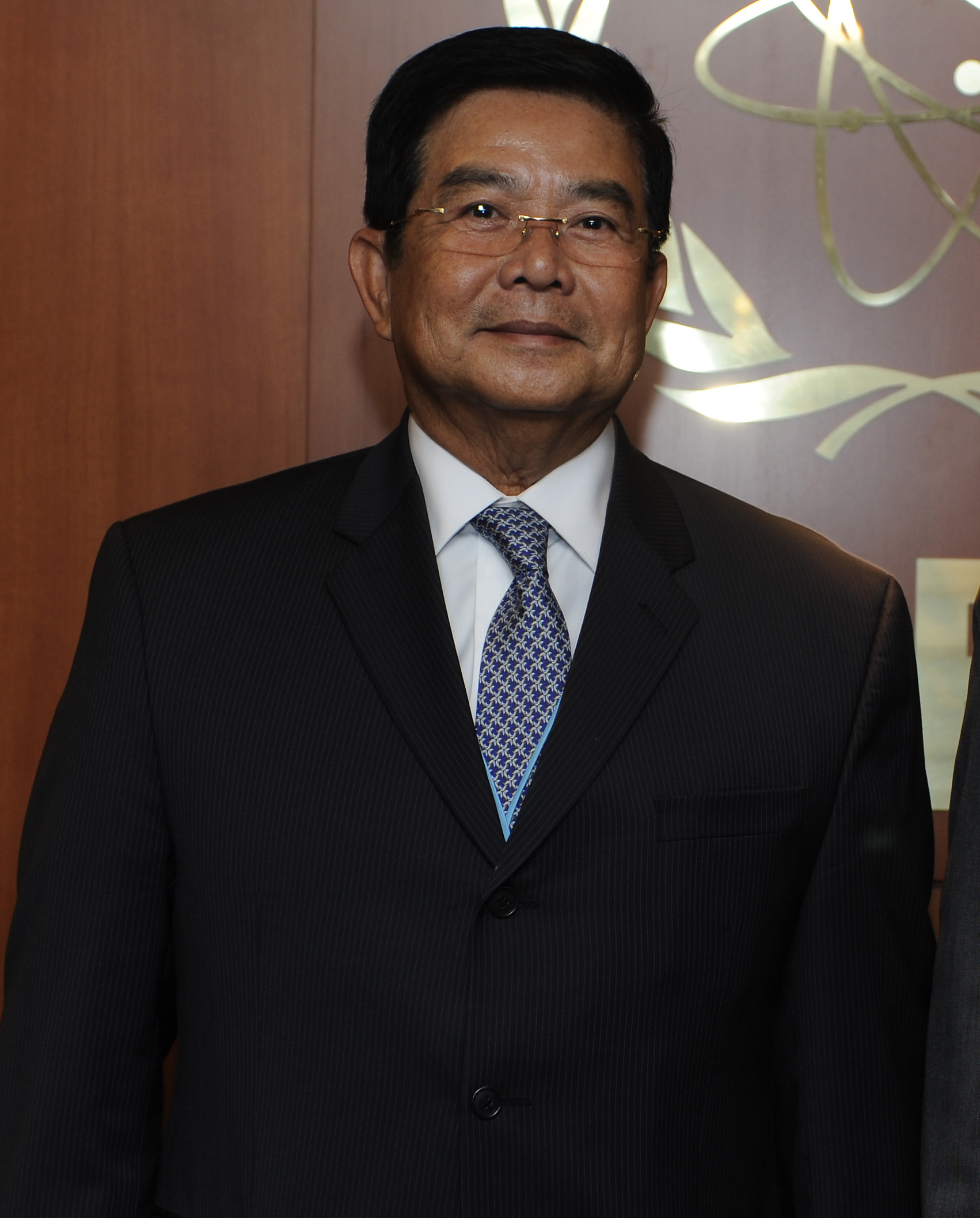
- Sem in 2011

Minister of Mines and Energy (Note: Minister of Industry, Mines and Energy from 2004 to 2013.)
- In office 16 July 2004 – 22 August 2023
- Prime Minister: Hun Sen
- Succeeded by: Keo Rattanak

Member of Parliament for Pursat
- Incumbent
- Assumed office 23 September 2013
- Majority: 93,928 (46.43%)
- In office 27 September 2003 – 9 October 2008

Personal details
- Born: 25 August 1947 (age 78) Phnom Penh, Cambodia, French Indochina
- Party: Cambodian People's Party
- Spouse: Chea Kheng

Suy Sem (Khmer: ស៊ុយ សែម; born 25 August 1947) is a Cambodian politician and Minister of Mines and Energy. He is a member of the Cambodian People's Party and was elected to represent Pursat Province in the National Assembly of Cambodia in 2003. He was reinstated as the Minister of Mines and Energy after the general elections in 2013. Before 2013, he served as Minister of Industry, Mines, and Energy which was split into two ministries: Ministry of Mines and Energy, and Ministry of Industry and Handicrafts.
