= Amath Yashya =

Cambodian politician

Amath Yashya or Amadh Yahya (Khmer: អះម៉ាត់ យ៉ះយ៉ា) is a Cambodian politician. He belongs to the Sam Rainsy Party and was elected to represent Kampong Cham Province in the National Assembly of Cambodia in 2003. Yahya is an ethnic Cham.
