= Pou Sothirak =

Cambodian politician

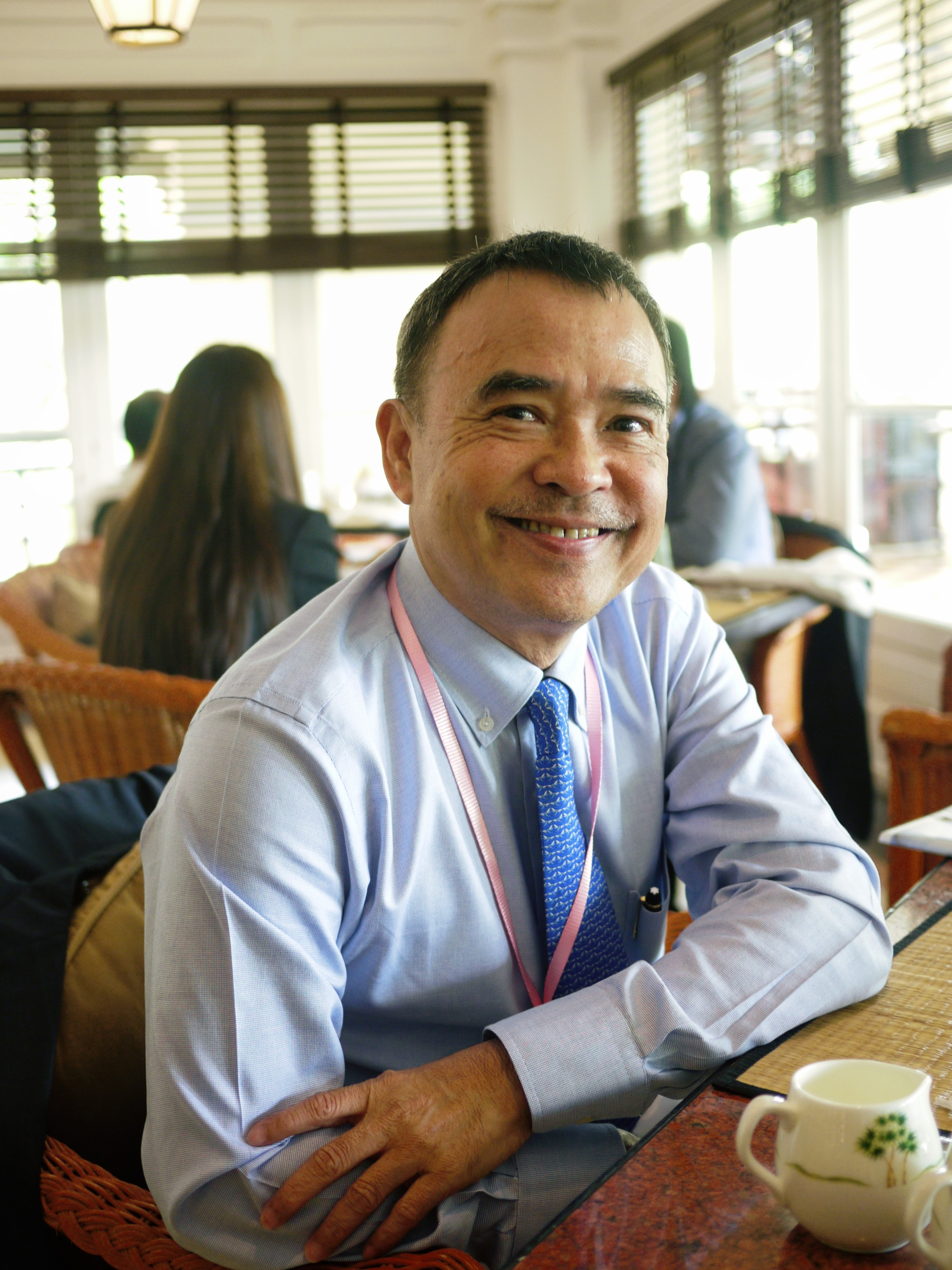
Pou Sothirak in August 2017.

Pou Sothirak is a Cambodian academic and former politician. He is currently serving as senior distinguished advisor to the Cambodian Center for Regional Studies, a newly established foreign policy think tank that is built by and for the young generation of Cambodia. Previously, he was the executive director at the Cambodian Center for Cooperation and Peace. Between 1993 and 1998, he was the Cambodian Minister for Industry, Mines and Energy. He is a former member of the royalist FUNCINPEC and was elected to represent Siem Reap Province in the National Assembly in 2003. Sothirak served as Cambodia's ambassador to Japan between 2005 and 2009.

He is a dual national of Cambodia and the United States. He acquired US citizenship in the 1980s during his studies at Oregon State University.
