= Sieng Nam =

Cambodian politician

Sieng Nam (Khmer: សៀង ណាំ) is a Cambodian politician. He belongs to the Cambodian People's Party and was elected to represent Siem Reap Province in the National Assembly of Cambodia in 2003.
