= Yos Son =

Cambodian politician

Yos Son (Khmer: យស់ សុន) is a Cambodian politician. He belongs to the Cambodian People's Party and was elected to represent Kampong Cham in the National Assembly of Cambodia in 2003.
