= Im Sothy =

Cambodian politician (1947–2017)

His Excellency Im Sothy
- អ៊ឹម សុទ្ធី

Minister of Education, Youth and Sports
- In office 16 July 2004 – 24 September 2013
- Prime Minister: Hun Sen
- Succeeded by: Hang Chuon Naron

Member of Parliament for Kampong Cham
- In office 28 May 1993 – 8 December 2017

Personal details
- Born: 24 May 1947
- Died: 8 December 2017 (aged 70)
- Party: Cambodian People's Party

Im Sothy (Khmer: អ៊ឹម សុទ្ធី; 24 May 1947 – 8 December 2017) was a Cambodian politician. He belonged to the Cambodian People's Party and was elected to represent Kampong Cham in the National Assembly of Cambodia in 2003. He was the education minister until 2013.
