= Hangchuon Naron =

Cambodian academic, economist, and politician

His Excellency Academician Hangchuon Naron
- ហង់ជួន ណារ៉ុន
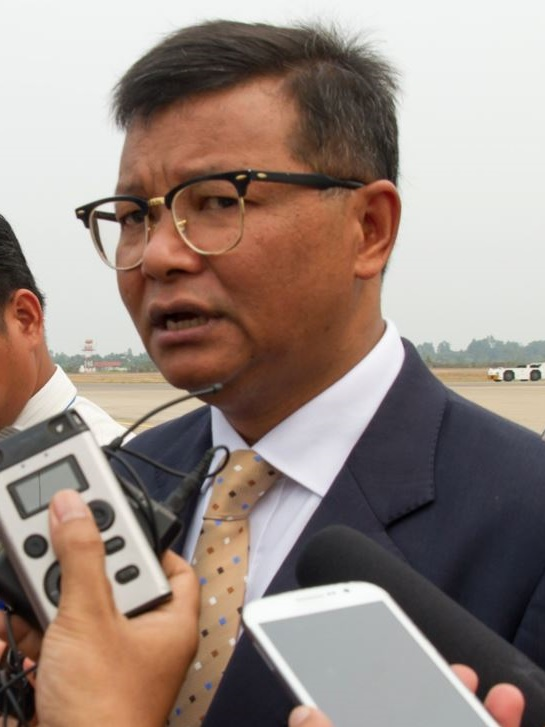
- Naron in 2015

Deputy Prime Minister of Cambodia
- Incumbent
- Assumed office 22 August 2023
- Prime Minister: Hun Manet

Minister of Education, Youth and Sport
- Incumbent
- Assumed office 24 September 2013
- Prime Minister: Hun Sen; Hun Manet
- Preceded by: Im Sothy

Secretary of State of Economy and Finance
- In office 2004–2013

Personal details
- Born: 2 January 1962 (age 64) Phnom Penh, Cambodia
- Party: Cambodian People's Party
- Children: 2
- Education: Royal University of Law and Economics (LL.M); Lumière University Lyon 2 (LLM); Moscow State Institute of International Relations (MS, PhD); Chulalongkorn University (PhD)
- Profession: Academic; economist; politician
- Website: H.E. Dr. Hangchuon Naron

Hangchuon Naron (Khmer: ហង់ជួន ណារ៉ុន [hɑŋcuən naːron]; born 2 January 1962) is a Cambodian academic, economist, and politician who is the current Minister for Education, Youth and Sport, serving since 2013. A member of the Cambodian People's Party, he was Secretary of State of Economy and Finance from 2004 to 2013.

Since taking office, he has implemented major educational reforms in Cambodia, which include anti-cheating exams.

== Academic background ==
- 2018: Doctor of Philosophy in Educational Administration, Chulalongkorn University
- 2012: Diploma, Rhodes Academy of Oceans Law and Policy
- 2010–12: Master of Laws, joint degree program of Royal University of Law and Economics and Lumière University Lyon 2
- 2006-08: Associate, Chartered Insurance Institute; Associate, Malaysian Insurance Institute; Degree in Insurance, Chartered Insurance Institute
- 1988–91: Doctor of Philosophy in International Economics, MGIMO
- 1982–85: Student at School of International Relations and International Law, Kiev State University
- 1981–82: Preparatory courses, Institute of Technology of Cambodia
- 1980–81: Baccalauréate II, Lycée Sisowath

== Political offices ==
- 2018: Member of the National Assembly, Kampong Cham constituency
- 2013–present: Minister of Education, Youth and Sport of Cambodia
- 2004–2013: Secretary of State, Ministry of Economy and Finance of Cambodia
- 2004–2010: Secretary-General of the Ministry of Economy and Finance of Cambodia

Political offices
Preceded by Im Sothy	Minister of Education, Youth and Sports; 2013–	Incumbent
