= Veng Sereyvuth =

Cambodian politician

Veng Sereyvuth (Khmer: វ៉េង សិរីវុឌ្ឍ) is a Cambodian politician. He is a member of the political party FUNCINPEC (The National United Front for an Independent, Neutral, Peaceful and Cooperative Cambodia) and was elected to represent Prey Veng Province in the National Assembly of Cambodia in 2003.

He also served as Cambodia's Minister of Tourism, until he was replaced by Thong Khon. Now he is the chairman of the Board Of Trustees in Pannasastra University of Cambodia
