= Chea Sophara =

Cambodian politician

His Excellency Chea Sophara MP
- ជា សុផារ៉ា
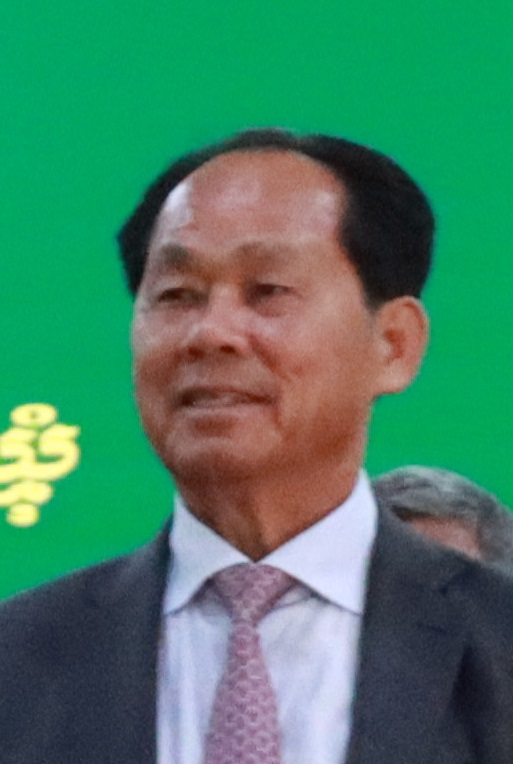
- Sophara in 2023

Deputy Prime Minister of Cambodia
- In office 6 September 2018 – 22 August 2023
- Prime Minister: Hun Sen

Chairman of the National Authority for Land Dispute Resolution
- In office 12 September 2018 – 22 August 2023
- Prime Minister: Hun Sen
- Preceded by: Bin Chhin
- Succeeded by: Say Sam Al

Minister of Land Management, Urban Planning and Construction
- In office 5 April 2016 – 22 August 2023
- Prime Minister: Hun Sen
- Preceded by: Im Chhun Lim
- Succeeded by: Say Sam Al

Member of Parliament for Tboung Khmum Province
- Incumbent
- Assumed office 5 September 2018

Minister of Rural Development
- In office 25 September 2008 – 4 April 2016
- Prime Minister: Hun Sen
- Succeeded by: Ouk Rabun

Governor of Phnom Penh
- In office 1998–2003
- Prime Minister: Hun Sen
- Preceded by: Chhim Siek Leng
- Succeeded by: Kep Chuktema

Personal details
- Born: 20 March 1953 (age 73) Kampong Cham, Cambodia, French Indochina
- Party: Cambodian People's Party
- Children: Chea Sopha Pheaksa; Chea Sophamaden
- Education: University of Health Sciences
- Website: Government website

Chea Sophara (Khmer: ជា សុផារ៉ា; born 20 March 1953) is a Cambodian politician who currently serves as Deputy Prime Minister and Minister of Land Management, Urban Planning and Construction since 2016. From 2008 to 2016, he was Minister of Rural Development. He was also the Governor of Phnom Penh from 1998 to 2003. He is a Member of Parliament for Tbong Khmum Province, since 2018.

== Personal life ==
Sophara has several children, including Chea Sopha Pheaksa, who is married to Tao Seng Huor's daughter Tao Madina, and Chea Sophamaden, who is married to Yim Chhaily's son Yim Leang.

== Honours ==
- Grand Cordon of the Order of the Rising Sun (2025)
