= So Khun =

Cambodian politician (died 2015)

So Khun is the former Cambodian Minister of Posts and Telecommunication. He was a member of the Cambodian People's Party and was elected to represent Takeo Province in the National Assembly of Cambodia in 2003. He is of Chinese descent, with ancestry from Meizhou.

Khun died of long-term illness at the age of 71 in 2015.
