= Ith Prang =

Cambodian politician

Ith Prang is a Cambodian politician. He belongs to the Cambodian People's Party and was elected to represent Kampong Cham in the National Assembly of Cambodia in 2003.
