= Cheam Channy =

Cambodian politician

- ជាម ច័ន្ទនី

Member of Parliament for Battambang Province
- In office 1998–2005

Personal details
- Born: 15 February 1961 Cambodia
- Died: 25 October 2018 (aged 57) Cambodia
- Cause of death: Brain tumor
- Party: Sam Rainsy Party
- Occupation: Politician

Cheam Channy (Khmer: ជាម ច័ន្ទនី; 15 February 1961 – 25 October 2018) was a Cambodian politician and member of parliament for the opposition Sam Rainsy Party (SRP). He was elected as a representative for Battambang Province in the 1998 National Elections, then again for Kompong Cham province in 2003.

== 2005 arrest ==
On 3 February 2005, a vote in the Cambodian National Assembly removed the parliamentary immunity from Cheam, fellow MP Chea Poch and party leader Sam Rainsy. Rainsy and Poch, both facing possible charges of criminal defamation, left the country. Cheam did not leave and was arrested later the same day by military police. He was charged by the Cambodian Military Court with the criminal offences of Organised Crime and Fraud, as well as a military charge of disobeying orders. These charges relate to accusations that Cheam had created an illegal army for the SRP. Cheam appealed by letter to Prince Norodom Ranariddh, but the prince responded that he could not intervene in judicial matters.

Cheam was brought to trial on 8 August 2005, after courts exhausted the maximum six months allowed by Cambodian law for pre-trial detention. In his defense, Cheam stated, "I have never recruited or appointed anyone in an army structure, nor have I taken money from anyone ... I am pleading with the court to set me free. I have never done anything even close to what the charges against me say." The prosecutor argued that Cheam's actions had endangered national security. The following day, the Military Court sentenced Cheam to 7 years imprisonment. Amnesty International criticized the trial, stating that it "fell far short of international standards for fairness and failed to produce any evidence to corroborate the charges against him".

== International response ==
The arrest and detention of Cheam met with widespread international condemnation. Peter Leuprecht, the special representative of the United Nations Secretary-General for human rights in Cambodia, called the trial unfair and called for Cheam's release. The U.S. State Department listed the case in a report on "Arbitrary Arrest or Detention" and noted that "international and local NGOs widely criticized Cheam Channy's arrest and detention as illegal under criminal law". Amnesty International declared him to be a prisoner of conscience. Human Rights Watch described the charges against Cheam and other parliamentarians as "a thinly-veiled effort by Cambodia's ruling parties to eliminate their political opponents", and objected to the use of a military court to try a civilian. On 1 February 2006, the European Parliament adopted a resolution calling on the Cambodian government to unconditionally release him. The United Nations Working Group on Arbitrary Detention declared Cheam's imprisonment "arbitrary" and "in contravention of article 14 of the International Covenant on Civil and Political Rights".

== Royal pardon ==
On 2 February 2006, King Norodom Sihamoni reduced Cheam's sentence from seven years' imprisonment to three years. Four days later, Cheam received a full royal pardon, and was released from prison. The U.S. State Department praised the pardon, calling it a "positive turn".

== Death ==
Cheam died on 25 October 2018. He had been suffering from a brain tumour that had subsequently spread to his intestines.
