= Kamchay Mear District =

District in Prey Veng Province, Cambodia

Kamchay Mear កំចាយមារ
- District
- Kamchay Mear District ស្រុកកំចាយមារ
- Location in Cambodia
- Coordinates: 11°34′N 105°42′E
- Country: Cambodia
- Province: Prey Veng

Population (2019)
  - Total: 84,368
- Time zone: UTC+7 (ICT)
- Geocode: 1402

Kamchay Mear (Khmer: កំចាយមារ [kɑmcaːj miə]; meaning "to chase away/disperse Mara") is a district (srok), divided into eight communes (khum), located in Prey Veng province, in south eastern Cambodia, about 113 km east of Phnom Penh. The important part of the economy is rice cultivation. The district also contains the Chea Sim Kamchay Mear National University, established in 1993 to provide higher education for local upper secondary graduates.

== Location ==
The Kamchay Mear District is located in Prey Veng province in south eastern Cambodia, about 113 km east of the capital city Phnom Penh, via National Highway 8.

== Demographics ==
The Kamchay Mear District is subdivided into eight communes (khum): Cheach, Doun Koeng, Kranhung, Krabau, Seang Khveang, Smaong Khang Cheung, Smaong Khang Tboung, and Trabaek. In these communes there are 129 villages (phum).

According to the 2019 Cambodian census, published by the National Institute of Statistics of Cambodia, Kamchay Mear had a population of 84,368 people. In an area of 464.3 square kilometres, this worked out to a population density of 181.7 people per square kilometre. This represented an annual growth rate of 1.1% since 2008, in which the recorded population was 74,407, in itself an increase from the 71,284 recorded in 1998. The gender difference in the population favoured the females with 53.4% females (45,074) in contrast to 46.6% males (39,294).

According to the 2019 census, the district contained 22,674 households with 3.7 people per household on average. Smaong Khang Cheung was the most populated commune with 14,944 inhabitants, while Trabaek was the least populated with 5,518 inhabitants.

== Economy ==
Agriculture has historically been an important part of the economy of the Kamchay Mear District. 97% of households identified agriculture as their principal occupation in 2008. Rice cultivation was particularly significant, with wet season rice cultivated on approximately 22,866 hectares, producing around 34,155 tonnes. Most of this cultivation depended on rainfall, with only 4% of the rice land receiving irrigation.

== Education ==
The Kamchay Mear District is home to the Chea Sim Kamchay Mear National University, which was established in 1993 as the Maha Issei Veth University. It was founded to provide local upper secondary graduates with access to higher education and to support regional development.
