= Nhim Vanda =

Cambodian politician

Nhim Vanda (Khmer: ញឹម វណ្ណដា) is a Cambodian politician. He belongs to the Cambodian People's Party and was elected to represent Prey Veng Province in the National Assembly of Cambodia in 2003.

Nhim Vanda is founder and owner of Kampot Zoo, established 1999.
