= Sok An =

His Excellency Samdech Vibol Panha Sok An
- សុខ អាន
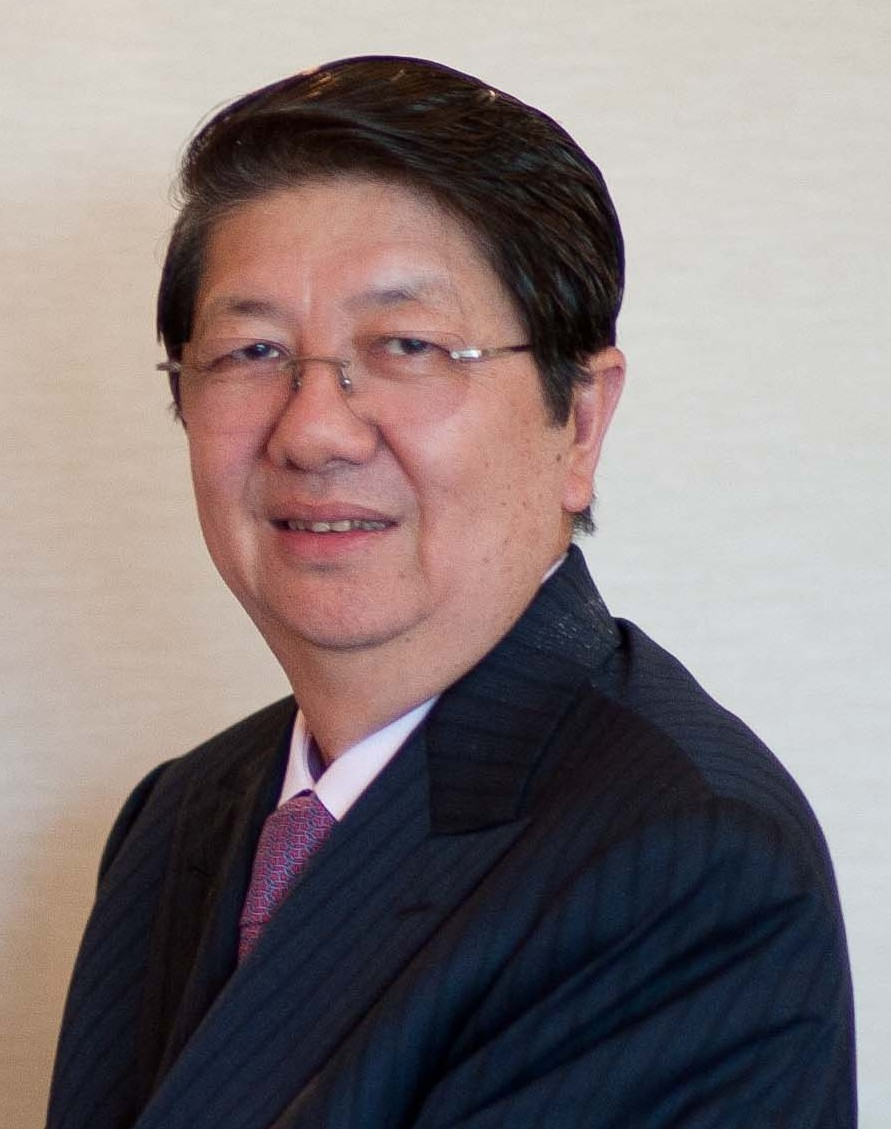

Minister in charge of the Office of the Council of Ministers
- In office 1994 – 15 March 2017
- Prime Minister: Hun Sen; Norodom Ranariddh; Ung Huot; Hun Sen
- Preceded by: Position established
- Succeeded by: Bin Chhin

Deputy Prime Minister of Cambodia
- In office 16 July 2004 – 15 March 2017
- Prime Minister: Hun Sen

Member of Parliament for Takéo
- In office 14 June 1993 – 15 March 2017
- Succeeded by: Chea Vandeth

Personal details
- Born: 16 April 1950 Kirivong, Takéo, Cambodia, French Indochina
- Died: 15 March 2017 (aged 66) Beijing, China
- Party: Cambodian People's Party
- Spouse: Theng Ay Annie
- Children: Sok Soma; Sok Puthyvuth; Sok Sokan; Sok Soken; Sok Sangvar
- Education: Royal University of Phnom Penh
- Profession: Politician, academic

Sok An (Khmer: សុខ អាន; 16 April 1950 – 15 March 2017) was a Cambodian academic and politician. He was a Member of Parliament (MP) for Takéo in 1993, then assumed additional roles of Deputy Prime Minister and Minister for the Office of the Council of Ministers from 2004 until his death. He was also a member of the central committee of the Cambodian People's Party.

== Early life and education ==
Sok An was born in Kampong village, Preah Bat Chuan Chum commune, Kirivong district, Takeo province to a Hakka Chinese Cambodian family.

Local accounts remember his upbringing in Kampong village, where he later supported development projects such as infrastructure in his home region as he rose through politics.

An completed his secondary education in 1967, later going on to become a high school teacher. Two years later in 1969, he was appointed as principal of a high school in Kirivong. He pursued higher education at the École Normale Supérieure in Phnom Penh, graduating with a bachelor's degree in Geography, History and Sociology in 1972. In 1972, he earned a High Diploma in Pedagogy. From 1973-75, he attended a high-ranking official training program in Diplomacy at the National School of Administration.

== Career ==
In 1980, An was appointed personal secretary to Deputy Prime Minister and Minister of Foreign Affairs Hun Sen. In 1981, he became Secretary‑General of the Ministry of Foreign Affairs, and in 1983, Secretary‑General of the Cambodian National Peace Council. In 1985, he was posted as Cambodia's Ambassador to India. On returning to Cambodia in 1988, he was appointed Deputy Minister of Foreign Affairs.

In 1991, he became Deputy Minister of Interior and Secretary‑General of the Supreme National Council. In the same year, he was appointed Director of Cabinet of the Central Committee of the Cambodian People's Party (CPP), before being appointed a member of the Central Committee in July 1992, and a member of the Standing Committee in January 1996. Following the 1993 general election organized by the United Nations Transitional Authority in Cambodia (UNTAC), he was elected to the National Assembly for Takeo and appointed Minister in charge of the government office in the first legislature. In 1998, he became a member of the Cabinet when he was appointed Minister in charge of the Office of the Council of Ministers and, concurrently, elevated to the rank of Senior Minister. He was promoted to Deputy Prime Minister in 2004.

As Deputy Prime Minister and Minister in charge of the Office of the Council of Ministers, he chaired the Accreditation Committee of Cambodia, established in 2003 to standardize graduate and post‑graduate education and introduce a one‑year foundation curriculum for university students. He also chaired the Council of the Board of Engineers of Cambodia. In July 2010, he was elected to the International Conference of Asian Political Parties (ICAPP) Standing Committee at its 13th meeting in Kunming, China. In May 2013, during the 4th General Assembly of the Centrist Asia Pacific Democrats International (CAPDI) in Indonesia, he was named Senior Vice President of CAPDI. In September 2014, at the 23rd Meeting of the ICAPP Standing Committee in Colombo, Sri Lanka, he was unanimously elected Vice‑President of the Standing Committee. In 2015, in Vladivostok, Russia, he was elected Chairman of the ICAPP Cultural Council.

He engaged in discussions with neighboring countries on border issues and on the development of petroleum and gas resources in jointly controlled areas. He chaired or co‑chaired the Council for Administrative Reform, Council for Demobilization of Armed Forces, Council for Legal and Judicial Reform, Cambodian National Commission for UNESCO, Cambodian National Petroleum Authority, Board of the Royal School of Administration, Board of the Royal Academy for Judicial Professions, National Authority in charge of Border Affairs, and the Royal Academy of Cambodia.

As President of the Authority for the Protection of the Site and Management of the Region of Angkor APSARA, which manages the 40,000‑hectare Angkor Archaeological Park on the World Heritage List, he oversaw activities relating to conservation and development. From the mid‑1990s until his death, in coordination with the International Coordinating Committee for the Safeguarding and Development of the Historic Site of Angkor (ICC‑Angkor), APSARA received more than US$500 million in grants for about 70 projects from various countries and international organizations. As head of the Cambodian delegation to the 31st regular session of the World Heritage Committee in Christchurch in 2007, he participated in the Committee's work. In response to Cambodia's presentation, the Committee agreed in principle to the inscription of Preah Vihear on the World Heritage List, which was formalized at the 32nd session in Canada in 2008.

== Awards and recognition ==
He received honorary doctorates in Law from Wesleyan College (1996), Public Administration from Jeonju University (2005), Political Sciences from the University of Cambodia (2006), Tourism Management from the National Economics University in Vietnam, Public Policy and Management from Chamroeun University of Poly‑Technology (2007), Education from the National University of the Philippines (2008), and Political Diplomacy from Woosuk University (2010). He was elected to the Russian Academy of Natural Sciences in 2002.

In October 2012, the ASEAN Federation of Engineering Organisations named him a Distinguished Honorary Fellow.

In 2017, he was granted the honorific title of Samdech by the King of Cambodia.

== Personal life and death ==
An was married to Lok Chumteav Annie Sok An and had five children. Through marriage ties, An was connected to Prime Minister Hun Sen, as one of An's sons – Sok Puthyvuth, a businessman – married Hun Sen's daughter Hun Maly in 2004. Another son of An, Sok Sokan, married Sam Ang Leakena, the daughter of the owners of Vattanac Capital, in June 2017, in a wedding attended by Hun Sen.

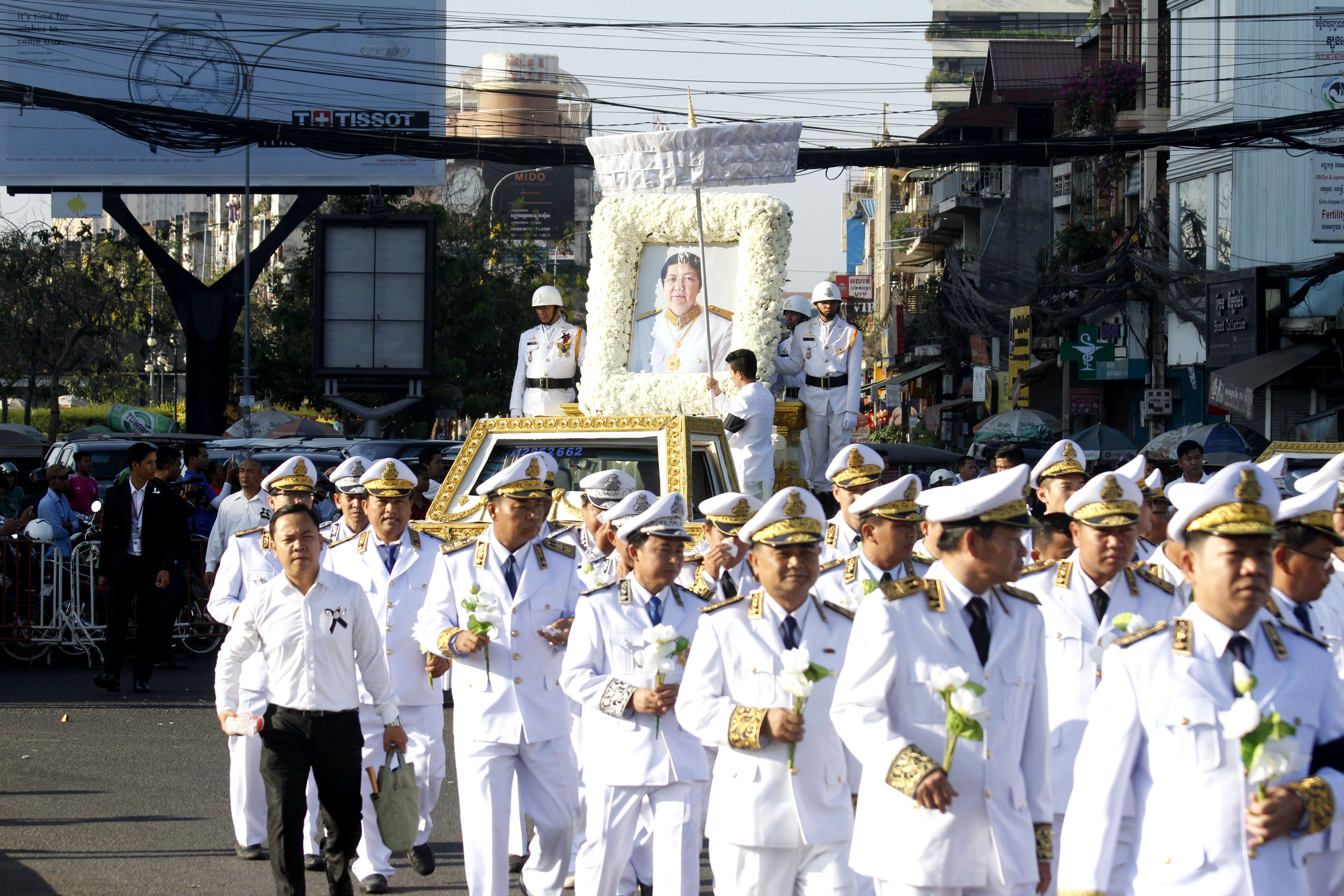
Sok An's funeral procession in Phnom Penh on 19 March 2017.

Sok An died at a medical center in Beijing on 15 March 2017 from an undisclosed illness, aged 66. He took a short leave of office in December 2016 while seeking medical treatment in Beijing.

An suffered from diabetes and other ailments at the time of his death.
