= Son Chhay =

Cambodian politician (born 1956)

Son Chhay AM
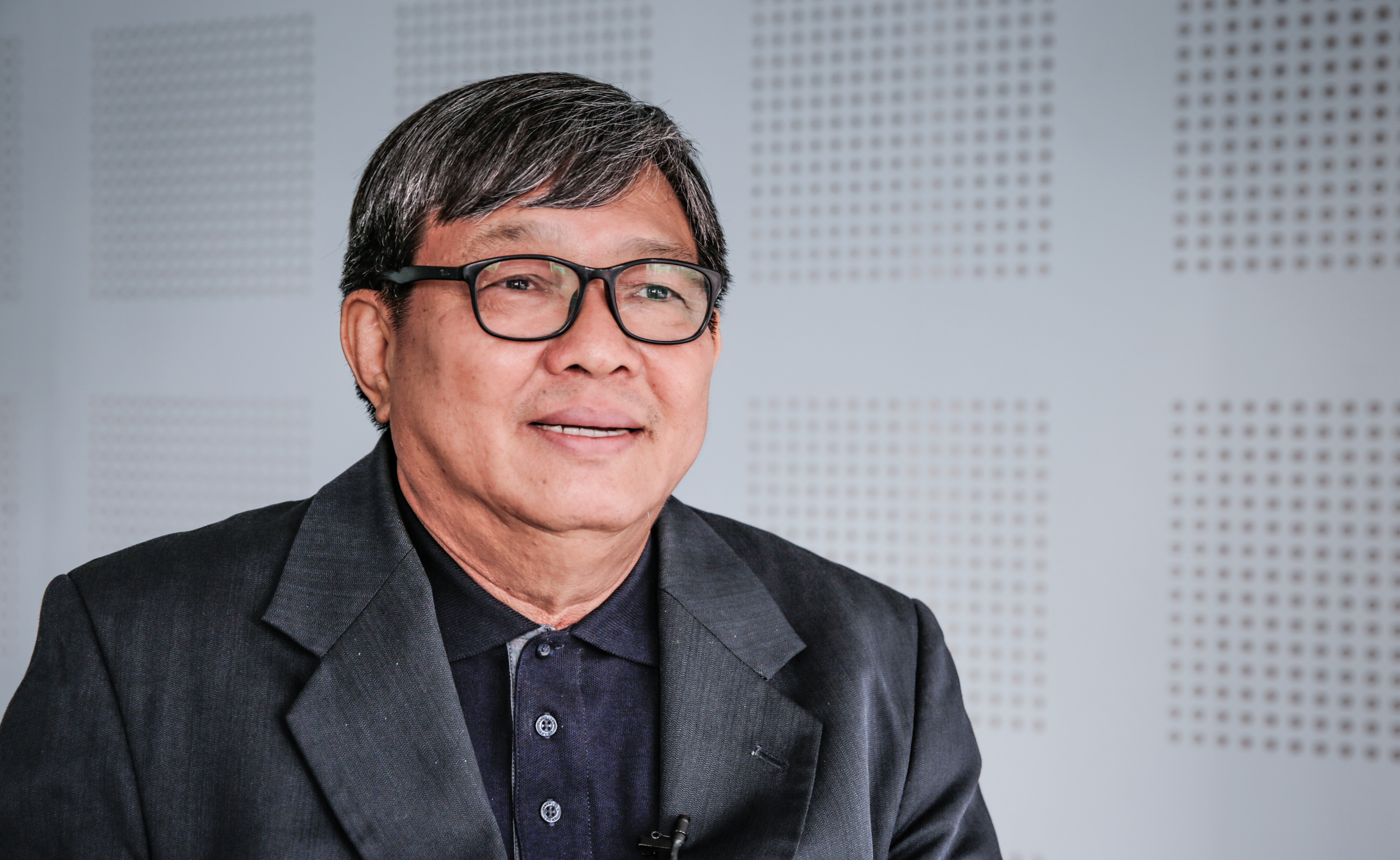
- Chhay in 2018

Member of Parliament for Phnom Penh
- In office 4 October 2003 – 16 November 2017

Member of Parliament for Siem Reap
- In office 14 June 1993 – 27 July 2003

Chief Whip of the Cambodia National Rescue Party
- In office 17 July 2012 – 16 November 2017
- Leader: Sam Rainsy; Kem Sokha

Personal details
- Born: 1 January 1956 (age 70) Siem Reap, Cambodia
- Citizenship: Cambodia; Australia
- Party: Candlelight Party (1998–2012; 2022–present); Cambodia National Rescue Party (2012–17); Buddhist Liberal Democratic Party (1993–97)
- Spouse: Christina Son
- Children: 3
- Education: Flinders University (BS); University of Adelaide (DipEd)

Son Chhay (Khmer: សុន ឆ័យ; born 1 January 1956) is a Cambodian politician, and one of the highest-ranking members of the Cambodia National Rescue Party. Son Chhay graduated in 1984 from Flinders University in Australia with a bachelor's degree in Mathematical Science. This was followed by a Diploma in Education from the University of Adelaide in 1985. Son Chhay was first elected to parliament in 1993 representing his birth province of Siem Reap and reelected in 1998 in the same province. From 2003 to the present he is a member of parliament representing Phnom Penh in the National Assembly of Cambodia. Son Chhay is well respected for his tireless effort to fight against corruption, promoting liberal democracy and human rights On 14 June 2010, Son Chhay was awarded the Order of Australia award for his services to Cambodia and the Cambodian Australian community in Australia. He is currently married to Christina Son and has 3 children.

== Cambodian Parliamentary service ==
- Member of Cambodian Parliament, since 1993.
- Member of Parliament, Phnom Penh, and Party Whip, Sam Rainsy Party (formerly Khmer Nation Party), since 1998.
- Chair, Cambodian Parliamentary Caucus on Myanmar, 2006.
- Chair, National Assembly Committee on Foreign Affairs, International Co-operation and Information, 2005–2008.
- Member of Parliament, Siem Reap Province, 1993 -1998.
- Chair, Parliamentary Committee on Public Works, Transport, Telecommunications, Post, Industry, Energy, Mines and Commerce, 1998–2003.
- Parliamentary Secretary, Committee on Education, Culture, Tourism and Religious Affairs, 1993–1998.
- Founder and Vice-President, Cambodian Australian Association of South Australia, 1981–1985.
- Founding Member, Association of Southeast Asian Nations Inter-Parliamentary Myanmar Caucus, 2004.
- Founding Member, Global Organization for Parliamentarians Against Corruption, 2002.
- Coordinator, South East Asia Parliamentarians Against Corruption, for 2 years.
- Founding Member, Coalition for Transparency Cambodia, 2001.
- Lecturer, Phnom Penh University, Cambodia, 1991–1993.
- Teacher at various schools and colleges in South Australia, 1986–1998
