= Math Ly =

Cambodian politician (1925–2004)

Math Ly (1925–2004) was a Cambodian politician. A former Khmer Rouge cadre, Math Ly later joined the Cambodian People's Party and was elected to represent Kampong Cham in the National Assembly of Cambodia in 2003.

== Personal life ==
Math Ly was born in Kampong Cham province to a Muslim Cham family. His father, Sos Man briefly served as the Minister of Religious Affairs under the Khmer Issarak movement in 1954 before defecting to North Vietnam between 1954 and 1970, bringing Math Ly along.

The family returned to Cambodia in 1970 where Sos Man served as the President of the Communist-backed "Eastern Zone Islamic Movement" from 1971 to 1974 before it was disbanded. The following September, Sos Man was poisoned by two strangers at his home in a remote part of the country along Highway 7.

== Political career ==
Around 1970s, Math Ly served as a cadre for the Khmer Rouge in the Eastern Zone of Cambodia, but soon broke ranks with them and sided with the Vietnamese forces. When the People's Republic of Kampuchea was formed in 1979, Math Ly briefly served as the Vice Minister of Interior before becoming the Vice Minister for Agriculture from 1979 to 1985, and was then offered as the President of the Trade Union in 1985.

In the late 1980s, he was appointed as the Vice-President of the National Assembly in Democratic Kampuchea and later was given the position as personal advisor to the King His Majesty Samdach Preah Boromoneath Norodom Sihanouk.

== Bibliography ==
- Kierman, Ben, Genocide and Resistance in Southeast Asia: Documentation, Denial & Justice in Cambodia & East Timor, Transaction Publishers, 2008, ISBN 1412806690
