= Suk Sam Eng =

Cambodian politician

Suk Sam Eng (Khmer: ស៊ុក សំអេង) is a Cambodian politician. He is a member of the Cambodian People's Party and was elected to represent Preah Vihear in the National Assembly of Cambodia in the 2003 elections.
