= Monh Saphan =

Cambodian politician

Monh Saphan (Khmer: ម៉ោញ សាផាន) is a Cambodian politician. He belongs to Funcinpec and was elected to represent Kampong Cham Province in the National Assembly of Cambodia in 2003.
