= Mom Chim Huy =

Cambodian politician (1936–2025)

Mom Chim Huy (Khmer: ម៉ុម ជឹមហ៊ុយ, 18 April 1936 – 7 June 2025) was a Cambodian politician. He belonged to the Cambodian People's Party and was elected to represent Kandal Province in the National Assembly of Cambodia in 2003. Chim Huy died on 7 June 2025, at the age of 89.

== See also ==
- Politics of Cambodia
