= Ek Sam Ol =

Cambodian politician

Ek Sam Ol (Khmer: ឯក សំអុល) is a Cambodian politician. He belongs to the Cambodian People's Party and was elected to represent Prey Veng Province in the National Assembly of Cambodia in 2003.
