= Chea Soth =

Cambodian politician

- ជា សុទ្ធ

Member of the National Assembly
- In office 27 July 2003 – 21 January 2012
- Constituency: Prey Veng Province

Minister of Planning
- In office 1982–1993
- Prime Minister: Chan Sy; Hun Sen

Personal details
- Born: 3 March 1928 Prey Veng, Cambodia
- Died: 21 January 2012 (aged 83) Phnom Penh, Cambodia
- Party: Cambodian People's Party

Chea Soth (Khmer: ជា សុទ្ធ; 3 March 1928 – 21 January 2012) was a Cambodian politician. He belonged to the Cambodian People's Party and was elected to represent Prey Veng Province in the National Assembly of Cambodia in 2003. He was Minister of Planning in the PRK government from 1982 to 1993.

Chea Soth died on 21 January 2012, at the age of 83.
