= Samrith Pech =

Cambodian politician

Samrith Pech (Khmer: សំរិត ប៉ិច) is a Cambodian politician. He belongs to the Cambodian People's Party and was elected to represent Kampong Speu Province in the National Assembly of Cambodia in 2003.
