= Min Sean =

Cambodian politician

Min Sean (Khmer: មឹន ស៊ាន) is a Cambodian politician. He belongs to the Cambodian People's Party and was elected to represent Prey Veng Province in the National Assembly of Cambodia in 2003.
