= Bin Chhin =

Cambodian politician

His Excellency Bin Chhin MP
- ប៊ិន ឈិន
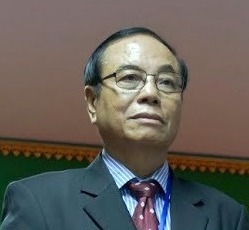
- Chhin in 2015

Member of Parliament
- Incumbent
- Assumed office 5 September 2018
- Constituency: Takéo (2018–present)
- In office 14 June 1993 – 29 July 2018
- Constituency: Prey Veng (1993–2018)

Deputy Prime Minister of Cambodia
- In office 5 September 2007 – 22 August 2023
- Prime Minister: Hun Sen
- Succeeded by: Vongsey Vissoth

Minister of the Office of the Council of Ministers
- In office 16 March 2017 – 22 August 2023
- Prime Minister: Hun Sen
- Preceded by: Sok An
- Succeeded by: Vongsey Vissoth

Chairman of the National Authority for Land Dispute Resolution
- In office 24 September 2013 – 12 September 2018
- Prime Minister: Hun Sen
- Succeeded by: Chea Sophara

Personal details
- Born: 17 August 1949 (age 76) Cambodia, French Indochina
- Party: Cambodian People's Party

Bin Chhin (Khmer: ប៊ិន ឈិន; born 17 August 1949) is a Cambodian politician who has served as deputy prime minister of Cambodia since 2007. In March 2017, he was appointed the acting Minister in Charge of the Council of Ministers following Sok An's death. He is also the chairman of the National Authority for Land Dispute Resolution, in charge of solving the nation's land disputes. He is a Member of Parliament for the constituency of Prey Veng.
