= Him Chhem =

Cambodian politician (died 2020)

Him Chhem (Khmer: ហ៊ឹម ឆែម, 1937/1938 – May 16, 2020) was a Cambodian politician. He belonged to the Cambodian People's Party and was elected to represent Svay Rieng Province in the National Assembly of Cambodia in 2003. In 2016, he was appointed Minister of Cults and Religion.

He died on May 16, 2020.
