= Nin Saphon =

Cambodian politician

Nin Saphon (Khmer: និន សាផុន, born 6 July 1948) is a Cambodian politician. She belongs to the Cambodian People's Party and was elected to represent Takeo Province in the National Assembly of Cambodia in 2003.
