= MOULINAKA =

Movement for the National Liberation of Kampuchea
- Abbreviation: MOULINAKA
- Leader: Kong Sileah (1979–1980); Nhem Sophon; Prum Neakareach (1992–1998)
- Founded: 1979
- Dissolved: 1998
- Ideology: Anti-communism; Sihanoukism
- Political position: Right-wing
- National affiliation: FUNCINPEC (1981–1992)

The MOULINAKA (Khmer: ម៉ូលីណាកា; Mouvement pour la Liberation Nationale du Kampuchea; Movement for the National Liberation of Kampuchea) was a pro-Sihanouk military organization formed in August 1979 by an armed group on the Thai-Cambodian border.

== History ==
MOULINAKA was formed on August 31, 1979, by Kong Sileah, a Naval Captain during the Khmer Republic who had been in France, after he refused General Dien Del's offer to join other border warlords in forming the Khmer People's National Liberation Front (KPNLF). Sileah wanted a united organisation instead of a front, as well as a unified command structure. It was the first resistance group to pledge loyalty to Prince Norodom Sihanouk, later becoming the military wing of his FUNCINPEC party. MOULINAKA received most of its backing from French-based Cambodian exiles and its support base was in the refugee camps along the Thai-Cambodian border, principally Nong Chan Refugee Camp near Aranyaprathet. The MOULINAKA was the forerunner of the more recognized umbrella organization ANS or Armée Nationale Sihanoukiste.

Sileah died at age 45 on August 16, 1980, apparently of malaria, and paratroop colonel Nhem Sophon took over sole control of MOULINAKA. General In Tam later took charge of military operations of the ANS. He was succeeded in 1985 by Sihanouk's son, Norodom Ranariddh.

In 1992, a splinter group from the FUNCINPEC party, the MOULINAKA Nakator-Sou (Kampuchean Freedom Fighter Party) was formed by Prum Neakaareach. The party took part in the 1993 elections and won one seat in Kampong Cham but was dissolved in 1998 due to infighting.

MOULINAKA also joined Hun Sen's Cambodian People's Party (CPP) after the 1993 elections, dealing a blow to FUNCINPEC, for they had both previously fought together against the PRK/SOC Pro-Hanoi regime, and because FUNCINPEC had given the MOULINAKA a government position at their own expense.
