= 1998 Cambodian general election =

- 26 July 1998
- All 122 seats in the National Assembly; 62 seats needed for a majority
- Turnout: 93.7% (▲4.1pp)
Party	Leader	Vote %	Seats	+/–
CPP	Chea Sim (Note: Hun Sen was the CPP's official prime ministerial candidate and leading figure throughout the campaign.)	41.4	64	+13
FUNCINPEC	Norodom Ranariddh	31.7	43	−15
SRP	Sam Rainsy	14.3	15	New
This lists parties that won seats. See the complete results below.
Results by provinces
Prime Minister before	Prime Minister after
Ung Huot (first); Hun Sen (second); FUNCINPEC; CPP	Hun Sen; CPP

General elections were held in Cambodia on 26 July 1998. The result was a victory for the Cambodian People's Party (CPP), which won 64 of the 122 seats, resulting in its leader Hun Sen becoming prime minister. Opposition parties sought a recount and claimed there had been irregularities, claims supported by many international observers. Voter turnout was 93.7%.

== Background ==
Following the disputed 1993 general elections, Norodom Ranariddh of FUNCINPEC and Hun Sen of the CPP had become co-Prime Ministers. In July 1997, Sen forced Ranariddh out of government after a dispute on to handle rebellious members of FUNCINPEC and former Khmer Rouge leaders. Ranariddh was subsequently replaced by Ung Huot. The removal of Ranariddh led to at least 89 extrajudicial killings.

General elections were announced for May 1998, but were later postponed until July by the National Assembly as preparations including voter registration were running late.

On 30 March 1997 an opposition rally outside the National Assembly was hit by a grenade attack, with at least 16 killed and 100 injured.

== Electoral system ==
The 122 members of the National Assembly were elected by closed list proportional representation from 21 multi-member constituencies based on the provinces.

There were 1,380 individual polling stations. At the end of polling, ballot boxes were taken to Commune Election Commissions set up by the National Election Committee (NEC) and were counted the next day. Statements regarding the count were added up at the Provincial Election Commissions, and the national tally made at the NEC. Parties could make complaints at any of the four levels during the count.

The results were countersigned and the statement of the count were announced outside the counting centers.

== Conduct ==
The observation of the election was coordinated by the United Nations with its Joint International Observer Group (JIOG), which consisted of European Union and ASEAN representatives. More than 500 foreign monitors worked alongside a national observer group to keep track of the voting process.

Many observers and other international organizations reported that the electoral process was heavily influenced by the CPP and that there had been intimidation, violence, coercion, lack of accountability and transparency. Following the elections, opposition party politicians and activists were reported to be relocating towards provincial cities and Phnom Penh and many were concerned about concealing their location due to fear of persecution.

A lack of training, many complicated forms, and packing procedures caused difficulties with the election count, especially in areas with low levels of education, literacy, and electoral experience. The NEC noted that there was a lack of space and planning, to the point where it was difficult to retrieve controls and recounts. Ballot materials were stacked on top of each other, which made it hard for the NEC to deal with the large number of complaints and demands for recounts. In total there were 800 complaints filed, 304 passing preliminary investigation related to voter intimidation, recount demands, and other concerned programs.

== Opinion polls ==
The Institut Francais de la Statistique, de Sondage d'Opinion et de Recherche sur le Cambodge (IFRASSORC), had conducted Opinion polls throughout the country, surveying a total of 1,875 people and each asking 3 questions.

This poll will show the choice of "Don't Know/No Opinion", but will not be factoring this choice.

Polling Firm	Fieldwork date	Sample Size	Most preferred Prime Minister						
Polling Firm	Fieldwork date	Sample Size	Hun Sen	Norodom Ranariddh	Sam Rainsy	Pen Sovann	Son Sann	Other	Don't Know/No Opinion
IFRASSORC	3 Mar 1998	1,875							
IFRASSORC	3 Mar 1998	1,875	16.6%	13.4%	7.8%	1.2%	0.4%	1.5	59.1%
IFRASSORC	3 Mar 1998	1,875	Do you want Prince Norodom Ranariddh to come back to Cambodia to compete in the next elections?						
IFRASSORC	3 Mar 1998	1,875	Yes		No		Don't Know/No Opinion		
IFRASSORC	3 Mar 1998	1,875	76.9%		3.7%		19.4%		
IFRASSORC	3 Mar 1998	1,875	Do you want a ceasefire to be proclaimed all over Cambodia?						
IFRASSORC	3 Mar 1998	1,875	Yes		No		Don't Know/No Opinion		
IFRASSORC	3 Mar 1998	1,875	95.4%		3%		1.6%		

== Results ==
Party	Votes	%	Seats	+/–
Cambodian People's Party	2,030,790	41.42	64	+13
FUNCINPEC	1,554,405	31.71	43	–15
Sam Rainsy Party	699,665	14.27	15	New
Khmer Democratic Party	90,000	1.84	0	New
Cambodian National Sustaining Party	71,093	1.45	0	New
Liberal Democratic Party for National Salvation	46,424	0.95	0	New
Buddhist Liberal Democratic Party	45,849	0.94	0	–10
Nationalist Party	37,308	0.76	0	New
Buddhist Liberal Party	32,959	0.67	0	New
Khmer Angkor Party	26,482	0.54	0	New
Cambodian Citizens' Party	23,713	0.48	0	New
Cambodian Unity Party	19,232	0.39	0	New
Party of Women Salvaging Cambodia	18,892	0.39	0	New
Farmers' Party	15,597	0.32	0	New
New Society Party	15,066	0.31	0	New
Republican Coalition Party	14,869	0.30	0	0
Liberal Democratic Party	14,088	0.29	0	0
Social Beehive Democratic Party	13,952	0.28	0	New
Free Development Republican Party	13,780	0.28	0	0
Rally for National Solidarity	13,038	0.27	0	0
National Unification Party	11,089	0.23	0	New
National Restoration Party	10,451	0.21	0	New
Light of Freedom Party	10,027	0.20	0	New
MOULINAKA	8,395	0.17	0	–1
Free Independent Democracy Party	3,938	0.08	0	0
Neutral Democratic Party of Cambodia	3,869	0.08	0	0
Free Republican Party	1,654	0.03	0	0
Twelve other parties	55,863	1.14	0	–
Total	4,902,488	100.00	122	+2
Valid votes	4,902,488	96.93		
Invalid/blank votes	155,189	3.07		
Total votes	5,057,677	100.00		
Registered voters/turnout	5,395,595	93.74		
Source: Nohlen et al.

== Aftermath ==
On 30 June, there was controversy surrounding the seat allocation formula. The English-language press of Phnom Penh and opposition parties claimed that the formula had been tampered with after the election results have been collected in order to favor the CPP. Annex V of the Law on the Election of National Assembly described the seat allocation method and all parties were informed and agreed to it in June. However, there appeared to be a difference between the original Khmer version and the English version. The misunderstanding led to large protests from the opposition.

== See also ==
- List of members of the National Assembly of Cambodia, 1998–2003
