= National Assembly (Cambodia) =

Lower house of the Parliament of Cambodia

National Assembly រដ្ឋសភា Roatsaphea
- 7th National Assembly

Type
- Type: Lower house of the Parliament of Cambodia Unicameral (1993–1999); Bicameral (1999-present)

History
- Established: 14 June 1993; 33 years ago
- New session started: 21 August 2023; 3 years ago

Leadership
- President: Khuon Sudary (CPP) since 22 August 2023
- First Vice President: Cheam Yeab (CPP) since 25 November 2021
- Second Vice President: Vong Sauth (CPP) since 22 August 2023
- Prime Minister: Hun Manet (CPP) since 22 August 2023

Structure
- Seats: 125
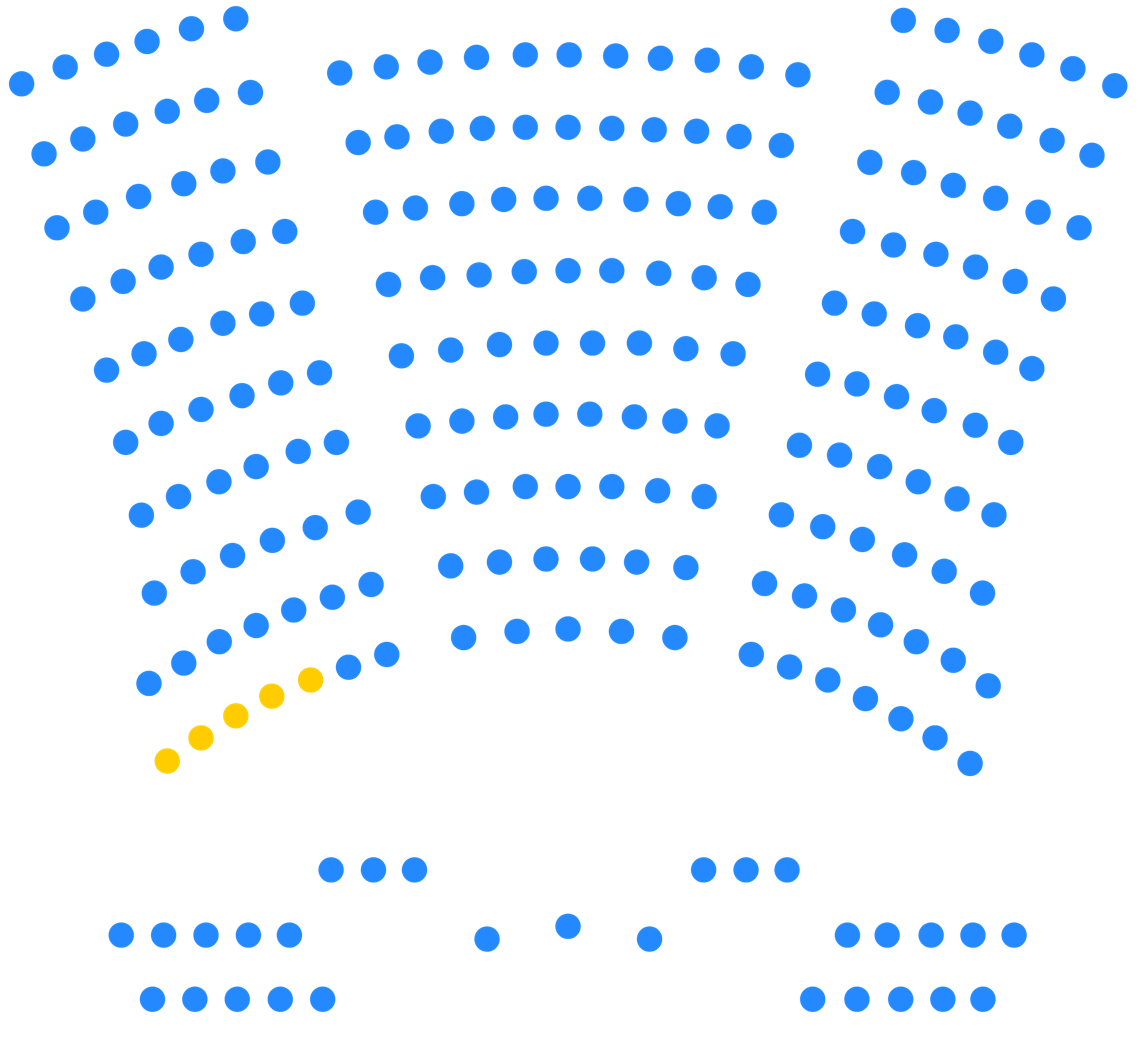
- Political groups: Government (120): CPP (120); Confidence and supply (5): FUNCINPEC (5) (Note: FUNCINPEC stated their support for the Government)
- Length of term: 5 years

Elections
- Voting system: Closed list proportional representation
- First election: 23 and 28 May 1993
- Last election: 23 July 2023
- Next election: 23 or 30 July 2028

Meeting place
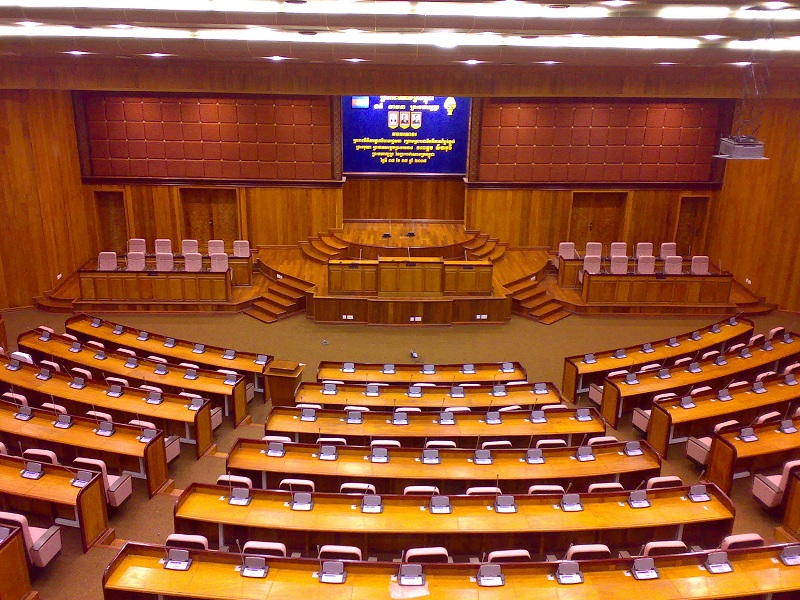

Website
- national-assembly.org.kh

The National Assembly (Khmer: រដ្ឋសភា, UNGEGN: Roatsaphea [rɔət.sapʰiə]; lit. 'State Assembly') is one of the two houses (chambers) of the Parliament of Cambodia. It is referred to as the lower house, with the Senate being referred to as the upper house.

The National Assembly is an elected body consisting of 125 members known as Members of Parliament (MPs). Members are elected for five-year terms by party-list proportional representation, using capital/provinces as constituencies of 1 to 12 members, and the D'Hondt method of seat distribution. A political party must secure 63 seats to obtain and preserve a majority.

The National Assembly is headed by the President, currently Khuon Sodary. The seventh National Assembly held its inaugural session on 21 August 2023.

== History ==
National Assembly building

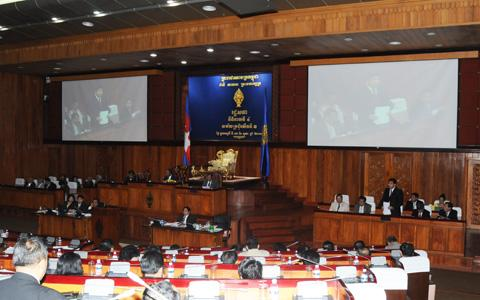
Parliament session in 2013

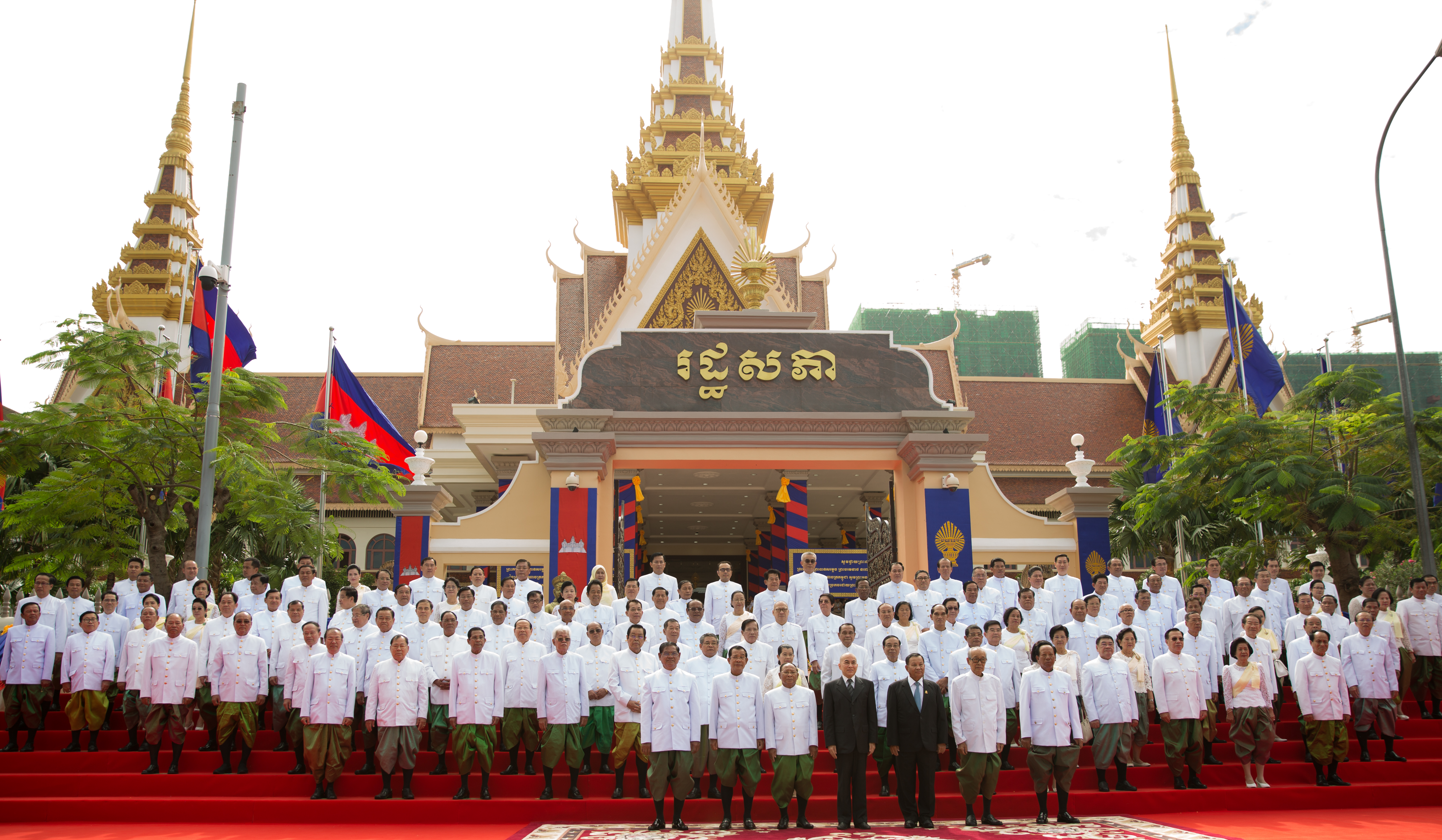
Members of the sixth National Assembly of Cambodia with King Norodom Sihamoni, 5 September 2018.

The current National Assembly originated as the Constituent Assembly, a legislative body elected during the United Nations Transitional Authority in Cambodia (UNTAC). After the 1993 election, the Assembly met and adopted a new constitution for Cambodia. After enactment of the 1993 Constitution, the Constituent Assembly was renamed the National Assembly.

- Cambodia held its first elections in history on 1 September 1946. The Democrats won a majority of seats in the legislature.
- Cambodia was proclaimed a constitutional monarchy on 6 May 1947.

== Electoral System ==
The Constitution of Cambodia states the National Assembly are elected 5 year terms from 25 multi-member constituencies based on the provinces by closed list proportional representation. Seats were allocated using the D'Hondt method and elections are to happen on the fourth Sunday of July.

Province	Seats
Banteay Meanchey	6
Battambang	8
Kampong Cham	10
Kampong Chhnang	4
Kampong Speu	6
Kampong Thom	6
Kampot	6
Kandal	11
Koh Kong	1
Kratié	3
Mondulkiri	1
Phnom Penh	12
Preah Vihear	1
Prey Veng	11
Pursat	4
Ratanakiri	1
Siem Reap	6
Preah Sihanouk	3
Stung Treng	1
Svay Rieng	5
Takéo	9
Oddar Meanchey	1
Kep	1
Pailin	1
Tboung Khmum	8
Total	125

== Qualification ==
The qualifications to be a candidate for the National Assembly are outlined in Article 76 of the 1993 Constitution.

- The candidate must be a citizen of Cambodia by birth only.
- The citizen must be at the age of twenty-five or older on Election Day.
- The candidate must be on the electoral register.

== Power and privileges ==
Law Adoption

- Adopt and Amend laws for Cambodia and approve the national budget and administration accounts. (Article 90)
- Approve or repeal international treaties and conventions. (Article 90)
- Initiate legislation. (Article 91)

Vote of confidence

- Shall pass a vote of confidence in the Royal Government. (Article 90)
- Dismiss any members of the Council of Ministers, or the Royal Government, by a motion of censure passed by an absolute majority vote of all Members of the National Assembly. (Article 98)

Oversight

- Shall have the right to propose questions to the Royal Government. The replies by the ministers or by the Prime Minister may be given orally or in writing. The replies shall be provided within seven days after the day the question is received. (Article 96)
- Oversee royal government performance and invite high-ranking officials to clarify important special issues to the National Assembly. (Article 89)
- The commissions of the National Assembly may invite any minister to clarify issues in fields under his/her responsibility. (Article 97)
- Oversee the law enforcement.

Representative

- The Members of the National Assembly shall represent all the Khmer people, not only citizens from their constituencies. (Article 77)
- Play an important role in helping citizens have their voice in society and to bring people’s concern and needs for decisions to the National Assembly.
- Intervene and solve problems faced by citizens.
- Member of Parliament have the right to express opinions in the exercise of his/her duties protected by “Parliamentary Immunity” and shall not be prosecuted, detained or arrested because of opinions expressed in the exercise of his/her duties, except in case of flagrante delicto offences. (Article 80)

== Commissions ==
Commission	Chairperson
Commission on Human Rights, Complaint Reception and Investigation, and Inspection	Hon. Mr. Sar Chamrong
Commission on Economy, Finance, Banking and Audit	Hon. Mr. Chheang Vun
Commission on Planning, Investment, Agriculture, Forestry, Fisheries, Rural Development, Environment, Water Resources, and Mereology	Hon. Mr.Loy Sophat
Commission on Interior, National Defense, Civil Service, and Border Affairs	Hon. Mr. Kep Chuktema
Commission on Foreign Affairs, International Cooperation, and Information	Hon. Mr. Suos Yara
Commission on Legislation and Justice	Hon. Mr. Ang Vong Vathana
Commission on Education, Youth, Sport, Cult, Religion, Culture, Fine Arts, and Tourism	Hon. Mr. Pa Socheatevong
Commission on Public Health, Social Affairs, Veteran, Youth Rehabilitation, Labour, Vocational Training, and Women’s Affairs	Hon. Mrs. Lork Kheng
Commission of Public Works, Transport, Civil Aviation, Posts, Telecommunications, Industry, Science, Technology, Innovation, Mines, Energy, Commerce, Land Management, Urban Planning, and Construction	Hon. Mrs. Nin Saphon
Commission on Investigation, Eliminating and Combating Corruption	Hon. Mr. Pen Simorn

== See also ==
- Parliament of Cambodia
- Senate of Cambodia
- Council of Ministers
- Politics of Cambodia
- List of legislatures by country
