= Son Soubert =

Cambodian politician

Son Soubert (Khmer:សឺន ស៊ូប៊ែរ្តិ៍) is a Cambodian politician, adviser to King Norodom Sihamoni and former member of the Constitutional Council of Cambodia.

== Biography ==
=== Youth and education from Phnom Penh to Paris ===
Son Soubert was born on 20 June 1942 in Phnom Penh, as the second son of Son Sann.

He was sent to Paris to pursue his studies and attended school at the Jesuit high school of Saint-Louis-de-Gonzague in Paris from 1954 to 1961 where he obtained the French Baccalaureate. He went on to study classic literature at the Sorbonne University as well as archeology at the Ecole du Louvre. With a scholarship from the UNESCO, he was able to travel and study in various places such as Rome, Japan, Australia and the United States of America in 1969 and 1970. In 1971, he co-authored S.O.S. Angkor with Henri Stierlin to raise awareness about the endangerment of the archaeological sites hostage of the Cambodian Civil War.

From 1971 to 1973, he was a resident scholar at the Pondicherry office of the Ecole francaise d'Extreme-Orient working with Claude Jacques and Jan Fontein. He returned to live in Nice on the Mediterranean Sea where he set up his own private company, a small superette for which he was helped by French pieds noirs who had been chased from French Algeria.

=== Returning to politics for a nation in exile ===
As Cambodia fell under the terror regime of the Khmers Rouge before being invaded by Vietnamese troops, Son Joubert actively supported the effort to welcome the asylum seekers in 1979. In 1979, with his mother and brother, he clandestinely escaped from France as his refugee status did not allow him to leave legally, and joined his father on the Thai border. He contributed to the foundation of the Khmer People's National Liberation Front and he presided over the Red Cross for the government in exile.

In 1984, Son Soubert joined the Coalition Government of Democratic Kampuchea (GCKD) chaired by Sihanouk and recognized by the United Nations. As tensions arose between various Khmer factions on the Thai border in 1985, Son Joubert was critical of the American imperialist foreign policy trying to merge his the KPNLF and the FUNCINPEC royall party "as a means of gaining better control over both" and evict his father Son Sann from the negotiations. In 1986, he became an executive member of the Khmer People's National Liberation Front in charge of foreign affairs. In that position, he represented Cambodia at the International Peace Conference of Paris in the summer of 1989. In September 1991, he became vice-president of the Khmer People's National Liberation Front and continued to coordinate the effort to provide aid to the Cambodian refugees and asylum seekers in partnership with the UNESCO and the UNICEF.

=== Representing the Khmer people in the "newly restored Kingdom of Cambodia, and democracy" ===
In what Son Soubert himself referred to as the "newly restored Kingdom of Cambodia, and democracy", he became an important representant of the Khmer people in the footsteps of his father. He was chosen as secretary general of the Buddhist Liberal Democratic Party In May 1992, and during the 1993 Cambodian general election, was elected in Battambang as a member of the Cambodian National Assembly. When the United Nations prepared lists for the general elections, it notoriously struggled to transcribe names from Khmer script to Latin script, and misspelled Son Soubert as "Seun Souberdo". He was chosen as second vice president of the Assembly in October 1993 under the chairmanship of Chea Sim after Son Sann was ousted by Ieng Mouly working his way to power. Unconditionally faithful to this father, he was part of the Son Sann group, along with Kem Sokha and Pol Ham.

In 1995, the tensions between with Ieng Mouly intensified, and along with Son Sann, Keat Sokunm, Kem Sokha, Thach Reng and Say Bory, Son Soubert was expelled from the Buddhist Liberal Democratic Party which imploded shortly after.

=== Protecting the Constitution in the turmoil of the Cambodian coup of 1997 ===
On 30 September 1996, a hand grenade exploded in his office leaving him and 24 other people including women and children injured. A public enquiry failed to identify the origin of the crime. In 1997, his father Son Sann left Cambodia again for Paris, and Son Soubert was left as the leader of his party. The more radical wing of his party was critical of him as a "soft-spoken leader" considered "ineffective" as tension grew in the wake of the 1997 Cambodian coup d'etat, while foreign observers at a time considered him to be among "the best and the brightest young men and women in all of Cambodia ready to lead that country into the next century".

In 1998, Son Soubert was one of the three seniors officials appointed by King Sihanouk to the Constitutional Council of Cambodia.

=== Retirement and commitment to the orphan children of Cambodia ===
In 2008, he joined Kim Sokha and Keat Sokun to create a new Human Rights Party. The venture failed.

In the 2000s, Son Soubert ran a farm orphanage in the province of Kandal one hour away from Phnom Penh. He also returned to the world of education and directed more than 15 published thesis in archeology.

In April 2011, Son Soubert threatened Soy Sopheap with a lawsuit, which he later dropped, after defamatory accusations about the controversial coalition they joined with the royalist Funcinpec and remnants of the Khmer Rouge, claiming that it was financed by selling Khmer land to the Thai.

In 2018, he regretted the fact that King Sihamoni was like a prisoner in his royal palace, comments which created controversy and criticism.

Son Soubert currently lives in Battambang where he has retired.

== Contribution ==
=== Cambodian patriot ===
Son Soubert has devoted his life as his ancestors for the defense of Cambodia which he considered a nation in survival mode, because of historical and present-day factors. He has argued that Khmer nationalism is a necessary "self-defense" as opposed to a "call for grandeur".

=== Promoting the separation of powers in Cambodia ===
During his tenure at the National Assembly of Cambodia, Son Soubert was concerned about protecting the separation of powers and critical of nominations which jeopardized the independence of the judiciary. He was named at the Constitutional Council of Cambodia as a defender of the rule of law.

=== Criticism of the Supreme Patriarch of Cambodia Tep Vong ===
Though Son Soubert was part of a devout Buddhist family, he was a very vocal criticism of the Buddhist hierarchy in Cambodia especially the role played by the Supreme Patriarch Tep Vong:

I believe that the Supreme Patriarch is not the disciple of Lord Buddha, but the disciple of the Pol Pot Khmer Rouge.

— His Excellency Son Soubert

Nostalgic of the former Supreme Patriarch Mahaghosananda, and the courage he had to lead the Khmer people, including political leaders on a Peace March after the coup in 1997, Son Soubert criticized the lack of care for social issues of the Khmer sangha and compared Tep Vong to former Supreme Patriarch Huot That in 1970-1971 who "dared not lead a procession begging for peace", despite the request by Son Sann.

== Family ==
Son Soubert was the son of former Prime Minister Son Sannn. Through his father, he was also a descendant of national hero Son Kuy who gave his life for Cambodia and defend the rights of Kampuchea Krom, and he was very critical when attempts were made to compare Sam Rainsy to his ancestor.

Son Soubert is celibate and without descendance.
