= Say Bory =

Cambodian lawyer

- សាយ បូរី
- Born: January 20, 1940 (age 86); Phnom Penh, Cambodia
- Education: Royal University of Law and Economics
- Occupations: Lawyer, Politician, Educator
- Known for: Defense lawyer for Khieu Samphan at Khmer Rouge tribunal; Member of the Constitutional Council of Cambodia; Former President of the Bar Association of the Kingdom of Cambodia
- Political party: Buddhist Liberal Democratic Party
- Children: Say Tevi

Say Bory (Khmer: សាយ បូរី) is a prominent Cambodian lawyer who served as a defense lawyer of Khieu Samphan during the Khmer Rouge tribunal, and currently sits on the Constitutional Council of Cambodia.

== Biography ==
=== Education ===
Say Bory was born on 29 January 1940 in Phnom Penh. After earning a master's degree in political science from the Royal University of Law and Economics in 1965, Say Bory was appointed vice-governor of the Province of Siem Reap. It was in that position that in 1966, Say Bory, as vice-governor of the, welcomed French president Charles de Gaulle during his diplomatic journey.

As Civil War raged in Cambodia, Say Bory went to Paris to further his studies and he defended his thesis in Paris in 1973 on rural administration in Cambodia and its reform projects (L'administration rurale au Cambodge et ses projets de réforme).

From 1981 to 1982 he worked as a legal advisor at the Paris City Hall, before starting his own business.

During those years of exile, he was the European delegate for the Khmer People's National Liberation Front and its main legal advisor.

=== Return to Cambodia ===
When Say Bory returned to Cambodia in 1992, he was chosen by the United Nations Transitional Authority in Cambodia as a legal expert in constitutional affairs and taught constitutional law at the university once again.

From 1993 to 1995, Say Bory was Minister for the relationship with the Parliament.

In the general election of 1993, Say Bory was candidate for the Khmer People's National Liberation Front's political arm, the Buddhist Liberal Democratic Party in Kandal province surrounding Phnom Penh. As monarchy was restored in Cambodia, it was according to Say Bory "the irony of history" that he and his fellow liberal democrats would be the ones supporting such a restoration. After a split in leadership between Ieng Mouly and Son Sann, Say Bory was expelled from the party in 1995 with four other high-ranking members.

That year, Say Bory came to prominence in Cambodia when he defended former Minister of Foreign Affairs Prince Norodom Sirivudh against charges that he plotted to kill Second Prime Minister Hun Sen.

Say Bory was chosen to be the first President of the Bar Association in October 1995. He was re-elected on 16 October 1996. At that time, Say Bory worked both internationally and nationally to improve the standards of the legal system in Cambodia. He traveled to four ASEAN countries to learn from the best practises concerning the Bar association. Beginning in 1996, as president of the Bar Association of the Kingdom of Cambodia, Say Bory, began weekly radio broadcasts on the citizen and the law.

=== Overcoming crisis at the Constitutional Council ===
In a letter dated 8 June 1998, as President of the Cambodian Bar Association Say Bory challenged Chea Sim "to protect the prestige and honor of the Constitutional Council" saying that the latter should not have presided over two sessions of the Supreme Council of Magistracy and that doing that had undermined the creation of the Constitutional Council. When the Constitutional Council first met on 15 June 1998, Royal appointee Pung Peng Cheng stepped down and was replaced by Say Bory while other appointees of the King never attended any Council meetings. On September 2, 1998, Say Bory was one of the main authors of a scathing report from within the Constitutional Council that surfaced in King Norodom Sihanouk's monthly bulletin adding weight to the opposition's accusations that the nation's top legal body is biased toward the Cambodian People's Party. In fact, a mechanism for judicial review was guaranteed under the 1993 Constitution by the establishment of a Constitutional Council, but the controversial context in which the relevant law was adopted and the council established led to general allegations of a lack of credibility of the body:

In 2001, Say Borin was critical of a ban on meetings concerning the border dispute between Vietnam and Cambodia suggesting that "Cambodia has no freedom of expression".

In September 2014, Say Bory began working as legal advisor to Kem Sokha, leader of the opposition, in his new role as first deputy president of parliament.

== Contribution ==
=== Defending Khieu Samphan ===
Along with controversial French lawyer Jacques Vergès, Say Boury was the defense lawyer of Khmer Rouge criminal Khieu Samphan.

=== Strengthening the rule of law in Cambodia ===
Say Bory has insisted that despite the King of Cambodia being invested by article 9 of the Constitution to defend the rights of his people, there is a need in Cambodia for the office of an ombudsman to safeguard the protection of human rights.

He has been careful to protect the independence of the judiciary in Cambodia, especially while seating at the Constitutional Council of Cambodia:

"If I remain in the [Constitutional] council it means the rule of law is not violated, but that does not mean I always agree [with the majority]."

— Say Bory

=== Raising political awareness ===
Say Bory as a lawyer has also been an active commentator on political life in Cambodia and actively taken part in the debate over the future of Cambodian democracy. He has continued to express strong political opinions albeit acknowledging when he was secretary of state for relations with Parliament that "opposing Hun Sen's policies puts your life at risk".

Say Bory has been intent on providing legal training to Cambodians to raise their political awareness, since coming back to Cambodia in 1992, teaching at the university, doing radio shows, and organizing seminars in the provinces:

“We want to strengthen knowledge quality capacity on the sub-national level, so intellectuals will go down to help on a volunteer basis”

— Say Bory

== Family ==
Say Bory is the father of Say Tevi, one of France’s most famous female Mixed Martial Arts fighters
