= Vietnamese border raids in Thailand =

Border conflict between Vietnam and Thailand

- Part of the Third Indochina War, Cambodian–Vietnamese War, and the Cold War
Date	1979–1989
Location	Thai–Cambodian border, Gulf of Thailand
Result	Status quo ante bellum: Withdrawal of Vietnamese troops from Thai border in 1989; Isolated outbreaks of open hostility between Vietnamese and Thai troops; Destruction of numerous guerrilla bases and refugee camps along the Thai–Cambodian border

Belligerents
Vietnam; People's Republic of Kampuchea (1979–89); State of Cambodia (1989)	Thailand; CGDK: PDK (Khmer Rouge); KPNLF; FUNCINPEC

Commanders and leaders
Lê Duẩn; Trường Chinh; Võ Nguyên Giáp; Heng Samrin; Hun Sen	Bhumibol Adulyadej; Prem Tinsulanonda; Chavalit Yongchaiyudh; Son Sann; Son Sen; Pol Pot; Khieu Samphan; Ieng Sary; Nuon Chea; Norodom Sihanouk; Norodom Ranariddh

Strength
200,000–250,000 troops (5th, 9th, and 317th Divisions with armored and artillery units)	120,000–150,000 troops Including Thai border forces and Cambodian factions (Khmer Rouge, KPNLF, FUNCINPEC)

Casualties and losses
Unknown; Unknown	422+ killed ~10,000–15,000 killed, 20,000–30,000 wounded or missing

After the Vietnamese invasion of Cambodia in 1978 and the subsequent collapse of Pol Pot's Democratic Kampuchea regime in 1979, the Khmer Rouge, responsible for the Cambodian genocide, fled into the border regions of Thailand. With assistance from China, Pol Pot's remaining forces regrouped and reorganized in the forested and mountainous zones along the Cambodia–Thailand border.

Throughout the 1980s and early 1990s, Khmer Rouge units operated from within refugee camps situated inside Thai territory, launching cross-border attacks in an effort to destabilize the pro-Hanoi People's Republic of Kampuchea. The Thai government, which refused to recognize the Vietnamese-backed regime in Phnom Penh, tacitly supported anti-Vietnamese resistance movements, including the Khmer Rouge.

This period saw heightened tensions between Thailand and Vietnam, marked by frequent Vietnamese incursions and artillery shelling into Thai territory in pursuit of Cambodian guerrillas who continued to harass Vietnamese occupation forces.

== Causes ==
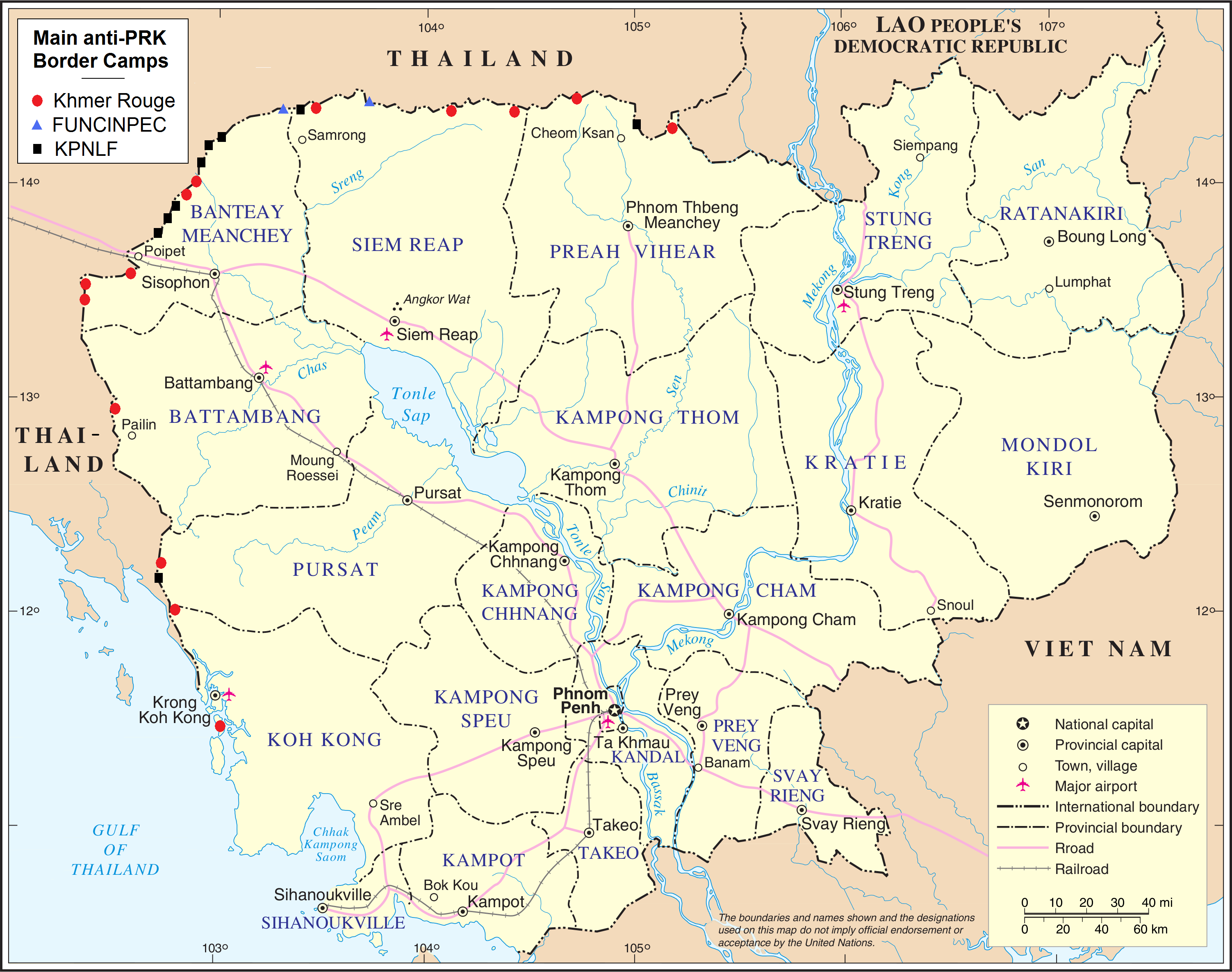
Border camps hostile to the People's Republic of Kampuchea; 1979–1984.

Thailand's suspicion of Vietnamese long-term objectives and fear of Vietnamese support for an internal Thai communist insurgency movement led the Thai government to support United States objectives in South Vietnam during the Vietnam War.

In 1973 a new civilian government in Thailand created a chance for some degree of reconciliation with North Vietnam, when it proposed to remove United States military forces from Thai soil and adopt a more neutralist stance. Hanoi responded by sending a delegation to Bangkok, but talks broke down before any progress in improving relations could be made. Discussions resumed in August 1976, after Hanoi had defeated the South Vietnamese and united the country under its rule. This resulted in a call for an exchange of ambassadors and for an opening of negotiations on trade and economic co-operation, but a military coup in October 1976 ushered in a new Thai government less sympathetic to the Vietnamese communists. Contact was resumed briefly in May 1977, when Vietnam, Thailand, and Laos held a conference to discuss resuming work on the Mekong Development Project, a major cooperative effort that had been halted by the Vietnam War. Beginning in December 1978, however, the conflict in Cambodia dominated diplomatic exchanges, and seasonal Vietnamese military offensives that included incursions across the Thai border and numerous Thai casualties particularly strained the relationship.

In 1979, in retaliation for constant border raids on Vietnam’s border, Bangkok allied itself with the genocidal Khmer Rouge, an adversary of Vietnam, and looked to Beijing for security assistance. Thailand's actions hardened Hanoi's attitude toward Bangkok. As the ASEAN member most vulnerable to a hypothetical Vietnamese attack for having given shelter to the Khmer Rouge in camps within its territory, Thailand was foremost among the ASEAN partners opposing Vietnam's 1978 invasion of Cambodia.

Refugee camps on the Cambodia-Thailand border allowed the growth of several anti-Vietnamese guerrilla organizations dedicated to regaining power in Cambodia. In addition to the Khmer Rouge armed forces (known as the NADK), the MOULINAKA, the KPNLF and its armed forces, the KPNLAF, and the Armée Nationale Sihanoukiste supporting Norodom Sihanouk all recruited and trained troops in the border refugee camps, striking at Vietnamese military targets. Because Thailand was offering protection to these groups, the Vietnamese felt justified in attacking Thai military units as well as the refugee camps, which they shelled and assaulted with disregard to the safety of civilian refugees and international humanitarian aid workers. Between 1986 and 1989, the Vietnamese enacted the K5 Plan, a massive network of trenches, wire fences, and minefields along the length of the Cambodia-Thailand border.

== Timeline ==
=== 1979 ===
- April: The first group of Vietnamese soldiers appeared on Thai territory next to the irrigation canal near Nong Chan to set up camp overnight. They were told by a Vietnamese speaking Thai Army military intelligence master sergeant to move out of Thailand territory.
- October: A major offensive by the Vietnamese against Khmer Rouge hideouts in their mountain sanctuaries pushed thousands of Khmer Rouge soldiers, their families, and the civilians under their control to the Thai border.
- 8 November: Thai artillery fire hit Nong Chan Refugee Camp, when a Thai soldier was accused of raping a Khmer woman and was shot to death. The Thai military commander Colonel Prachak Sawaengchit ordered his troops to shell Nong Chan, killing about 100 refugees.
- 12 November: Vietnamese attacks opposite Ban Laem drove 5,000 Khmer Rouge troops and villagers into Thailand. About half went to Kamput Holding Center.

=== 1980 ===
- 23 June: In response to the organised repatriation of thousands of refugees, 200 People's Army of Vietnam (PAVN) troops crossed the border at 02:00 into the Ban Non Mak Mun area, including Nong Chan Refugee Camp, setting off a three-day artillery battle that left about 200 dead, including around 22–130 Thai soldiers, one Thai villager, scores of refugees and approximately 72–100 Vietnamese troops. Hundreds of refugees were reported killed, many by a Thai artillery barrage that struck one of the camps. Others were caught in the crossfire. Several hundred refugees who resisted the Vietnamese were bound and executed. Vietnamese troops temporarily seized two Thai border villages including Ban Non Mak Mun and shelled others.
- 24 June: Still controlling Nong Chan, Vietnamese forces fought artillery and small arms duels with Thai troops and attacked guerrilla strongpoints. The Vietnamese shot down two Thai military aircraft.
- 26 June: Vietnamese troops seized two relief officials (Robert Ashe and International Committee of the Red Cross (ICRC) Medical Coordinator Dr. Pierre Perrin) and two American photographers at Nong Chan Refugee Camp.

=== 1981 ===
- 4 January: Vietnamese forces stormed across the border, opened fire with rocket-propelled grenades and automatic weapons, and battled with Thai troops before being pushed back. Two Thai soldiers were killed and one was wounded during the early morning, 90-minute battle. Between 50 and 60 Vietnamese soldiers reportedly opened fire on a Thai patrol half a mile inside Thailand. Vietnamese casualties are unknown. Thai troop reinforcements were rushed to the border the next day and put on alert against another cross-border raid by Hanoi's troops.

=== 1982 ===
- 11 February: Vietnam People's Air Force An-26 26264 was shot down by two Royal Thai Air Force Northrop F-5Es and crashed in a rice field near Prachinburi, Thailand during an intelligence-gathering mission from Phnom Penh, reportedly killing one of 13 onboard
- Early March: A spate of incidents along the border, culminating in the intrusion of 300 Vietnamese troops and the killing of a number of Thai Border Patrol Police.
- 21 October: Vietnamese gunners opened fire on a Thai reconnaissance plane near the border, but did not hit the aircraft. The plane returned to its base inside Thailand.

=== 1983 ===
- January: Cambodian government troops, backed by Vietnamese units, conducted a major offensive against the Coalition Government of Democratic Kampuchea, which united three resistance factions. The fighting spilled over onto Thai soil. More than 47,000 Cambodians fled to Thailand.
- 16 January: Vietnamese troops recaptured the hamlet of Yeang Dangkum, east of Nong Chan. Insurgents from the non-Communist Khmer People's National Liberation Front (KPNLF) captured the hamlet on 26 December and held it as part of a series of initiatives at year's end.
- 21 January: Vietnamese artillery attack forced the KPNLF base in the 0'Bok pass to move into Thailand. Non-combatants return at the end of the month.
- 31 January – 1 February: With heavy artillery support, 4,000 armour-led Vietnamese troops launched an assault against Nong Chan, one of the largest refugee camps on the border, destroying it. Ground fighting was reported outside the camp between Vietnamese troops based in Cambodia and about 2,000 KPNLF guerrillas. At the same time the Vietnamese kept up a steady barrage of shells, rockets and mortars. At least 50 shells landed in Thai territory, killing a 66-year-old farmer and damaging several houses and a Buddhist temple. The refugee population of about 24,000 fled with unknown casualties while MOULINAKA units were brushed aside, and KPNLF forces withdrew after a 36-hour fight. The Khao-I-Dang ICRC hospital received over 100 civilian wounded.
- 31 March: 1,000 Vietnamese troops, augmented by about 600 PRK "people's volunteers," attacked the Khmer Rouge refugee settlements of Phnom Chat and Chamkar Kor, aided by artillery, rocket, and Soviet T-54 tank fire. Thai officials reported that the Vietnamese attacks again had resulted in "spillovers" with Vietnamese artillery and mortar shells falling into adjacent Thai territory. Vietnamese troops clashed with Thai forces for several days, drawing Bangkok into a defensive campaign. Intense exchange of artillery and tank fire killed 30 civilians and injured some 300 persons. Approximately 22,000 Cambodian civilians fled to Thailand for refuge.
- Early April: PVNA destroyed the camp of Phnom Chat, civilians evacuated to Red Hill. Sihanouk's Camp David was attacked and civilians moved to Green Hill. One Thai jet was shot down.
- 1 April: The Thai Government reported that a large force of Vietnamese troops had attacked a total of 3 refugee camps along the Thai-Cambodian border. The New York Times reported that at least 7,000 civilians had fled westward into Thai territory.
- 3 April: At least 100 Vietnamese troops crossed into Thailand and fought hand-to-hand with a Thai border patrol, killing five Thai soldiers and wounding eight. An assault on Ampil Camp, the KPNLF headquarters, failed because KPNLF sabotage units had blown up several fuel depots in the weeks prior to the attack, leaving the division short of diesel and unable to mobilise its armour.
- 27 December: Vietnam moved troops, tanks and armoured personnel carriers into an area near the eastern border of Thailand and was apparently preparing to attack Cambodian guerrillas. About 350 Vietnamese troops with several T-54 tanks and armoured personnel carriers arrived in Thmar Puok village in western Cambodia, 14 miles southeast of the major base of the non-Communist Cambodian rebels and 16 miles from the Thai frontier. Thai military and security officials expected Vietnamese forces to begin a dry-season offensive against Cambodian guerrillas next month.
- December: Vietnamese troops clashed with Thai troops repeatedly on land while Vietnam People's Navy gunboats opened fire on a fleet of ten Thai fishing trawlers about 20 miles off the southern Vietnamese coast, seizing five trawlers and capturing 130 fishermen.

=== 1984 ===
- 25 March-early April: Hanoi launched a 12-day cross-border operation into Thai territory in pursuit of Khmer Rouge rebels, using Soviet-made T-54 tanks, 130-mm artillery, and some 400–600 troops. As a result, Thai artillery and air power had to be called into action, resulting in dozens of casualties on both sides and the downing of another Thai military aeroplane. Vietnam's cross-border raid, along with Thai military and civilian casualties, was reviewed as seriously undermining Thailand's security. Minor clashes occurred in the area of the Khmer Rouge camp, the Chong Phra Palai Pass linking Cambodia and Thailand.
- 15 April: Six hundred Vietnamese troops of the 5th Division and the 8th Border Defense Regiment first shelled, then entered Ampil Camp, a guerrilla base on the border, killing 85 and wounding about 60 Cambodian civilians. The dawn attack was supported by tanks and artillery. About 50 artillery shells landed on Thai territory near the base of KPNLF guerrillas. In a broadcast monitored in Bangkok, guerrillas loyal to Prince Sihanouk said Vietnam had eight battalions within striking distance of their stronghold at Tatum, a settlement just inside Cambodia's northern border. Thai troops had been put on full alert to prevent a spillover of the fighting.
- Late May-early June: the Vietnamese Navy repeatedly attacked Thai fishing trawlers off the Vietnamese coast, resulting in the deaths of three Thai fishermen.
- 10 August: Vietnamese infantry, APCs and artillery stationed north of Ampil Camp shelled Nong Chan and Ampil, forcing 10,000 KPNLF troops and civilian refugees to flee into Thailand. Since the 15 April battle for Ampil, the KPNLF had regained control of the camp.
- 28 October: Thai Border Patrol Police capture 5 unarmed Vietnamese infantry regulars who had entered Thailand near Ban Wang Mon southeast of Aranyaprathet, reportedly looking for food.
- 6 November: Vietnamese troops attacked a lightly manned Thai Border Patrol outpost near Surin on the border. Two Thai soldiers were killed, 25 wounded and 5 missing in fighting for control of Hill 424 at Traveng, 180 miles northeast of Bangkok. About 100 soldiers from the PAVN 73rd Regiment pushed about a mile into Thai territory but were later forced back into Cambodia by Thai forces. A Thai military source said the Vietnamese crossed the border in pursuit of Khmer Rouge guerrillas.
- 18–26 November: Nong Chan Refugee Camp was attacked by over 2,000 soldiers of the PAVN 9th Division and fell after a week of fighting, during which 3 Vietnamese captains and 66 Cambodian soldiers of the KPRAF were killed. 30,000 civilians were moved to evacuation Site 3 (Ang Sila) then to Site 6 (Prey Chan).
- 8 December: Nam Yuen, a small camp in eastern Thailand near the border with Laos, was shelled and evacuated.
- 11 December: Sok Sann was shelled and evacuated.
- 25 December: Nong Samet Refugee Camp was attacked at dawn. The entire Vietnamese 9th Infantry Division (over 4000 men) plus 18 artillery pieces and 27 T-54 tanks and armoured personnel carriers participated in this assault. The Vietnamese deployed both 105 mm and 130 mm howitzers, Soviet-built M-46 field guns with a range of up to 27 kilometres. KPNLAF guerrillas claimed that 14 Vietnamese tanks and APCs were destroyed during the fighting. An estimated 55 resistance fighters and 63 civilians died in the assault and 60,000 civilians were evacuated to Red Hill. Approximately 200 war wounded were evacuated to Khao-I-Dang. Numerous KPNLAF soldiers and officers, including General Dien Del, reported that during fighting at Nong Samet on 27 December the Vietnamese used a green-coloured "nonlethal but powerful battlefield gas " which stunned its victims and caused nausea and frothing at the mouth. Over 3,500 KPNLAF troops held portions of the camp for about a week after this, but in the end it was abandoned.
- 31 December: Vietnamese troops ambushed two Thai Ranger units in Buriram province, wounding six and pinning them down with small arms fire for over 24 hours.

=== 1985 ===
- January–February: A powerful Vietnamese offensive overruns virtually all key bases of the Cambodian guerrillas along the frontier, putting the Thais and Vietnamese in direct confrontation along many stretches.
- 5 January: Paet Um attacked and evacuated.
- 7–8 January: Five to six thousand Vietnamese troops, backed by artillery and 15 T-54 tanks and 5 APCs, attacked Ampil (Ban Sangae). Vietnamese troops were supported by 400–500 Cambodian KPRAF troops. The attack was preceded by heavy artillery bombardment, with between 7,000 and 20,000 shells falling over a 24-hour period. Nong Chan and Nong Samet were also shelled. Ampil camp fell to the Vietnamese after a few hours of fighting in spite of General Dien Del's predictions. KPNLAF troops disabled 6 or 7 tanks but reportedly lost 103 men in combat. San Ro civilian population evacuated to Site 1. A Thai A-37 Dragonfly ground attack plane was shot down over Buriram Province during the fighting, killing one of the two crew members. During the assault on Ampil, Thai troops defending Hill 37 near Ban Sangae sustained 11 killed and 19 injured.
- 23–27 January: Dong Ruk and San Ro camps shelled, 18 civilians were killed. Population of 23,000 fled to Site A.
- 28–30 January: Vietnamese artillery fired about one hundred 130mm shells, mortars and rockets at positions of the Khmer Rouge's 320th Division near the Khao Din Refugee Camp about 34 miles south of Aranyaprathet. This was followed by an infantry assault on Khao Ta-ngoc.
- 13 February: Nong Pru, O'Shallac and Taprik (South of Aranyaprathet) attacked and evacuated to Site 8.
- 16 February: In a skirmish with non-communist rebel forces near Ta Phraya, four Vietnamese rockets containing toxic gas were fired, causing Thai villagers in the area to complain of dizziness and vomiting. A Thai Army laboratory confirmed that the rockets contained phosgene gas.
- 18 February: 300 Vietnamese troops assaulted Khmer Rouge positions near Khlong Nam Sai, 19 miles southeast of Aranyaprathet. Fighting began with small arms exchanges and escalated into a Vietnamese barrage with heavy artillery and mortars. Thai troops fired warning shots at Vietnamese soldiers as they crossed the border in pursuit of fleeing Khmer Rouge guerrillas. One Thai villager was killed.
- 20 February: Vietnamese and Thai soldiers fought on Hill 347, about half a mile inside Thailand's northeastern province of Buriram. A Thai officer was killed and two soldiers were wounded in the fighting, which included an artillery duel across the border.
- 5 March: Tatum attacked. Green Hill population evacuated to Site B. Dong Ruk, San Ro, Ban Sangae, and Vietnamese Land Refugees are all moved to Site 2. Some 1,000 Vietnamese troops were regularly intruding into Thai territory in attempts to outflank units of the Cambodian resistance groups.
- 6 March: Thai troops and aircraft forced Vietnamese troops to retreat from one of three hills on Thai territory which the Vietnamese had captured during preceding days. Royal Thai Air Force fighter-bombers flew missions against about 1,000 Vietnamese who crossed the Thai-Cambodian border in two places. Some 60 Vietnamese troops were killed in the Thai counterattack.
- 7 March: Thai army troops supported by artillery and A-37 Dragonfly aircraft recaptured three hills seized by intruding Vietnamese soldiers. Hundreds of Vietnamese were said to have been driven back across the border into Cambodia. However, the Vietnamese counterattacked against Hill 361 on Thai soil behind the besieged Cambodian guerrilla base at Tatum, and the results of the battle were not immediately clear. 14 Thai soldiers and 15 Thai civilians had been killed.
- 1 April: Around 800 Vietnamese captured an area in northern Chamrak sub-district in Trat province, only to be repelled by the Thai army on 9 May. 1 Thai soldier was killed, while 8 Vietnamese were found dead.
- 4 April: A clash occurred at Laem Nong Ian, after five Vietnamese intruded about 875 yards into Thailand.
- 6 April: Thai Border policemen killed a Vietnamese soldier in Thailand during a 10-minute fight near the border.
- 20 April: At southeastern Thailand's Trat Province, some 1,200 Vietnamese troops attacked Thai positions situated 3 to 4 km from the Gulf of Thailand. Instead of withdrawing the Vietnamese set up a permanent base on a hill in Thailand, about a half-mile from the border, where they laid mines and built bunkers. Later, escalating Thai attacks had pushed some of the Vietnamese back into Cambodia, but the Vietnamese dispatched a fresh battalion of 600 to 800 men to reinforce the hilltop.
- 10 May: A Thai soldier was killed after stepping on a land mine while on patrol.
- 11 May: Thai jet fighters and heavy artillery pounded Vietnamese troops occupying a hill half a mile inside Thailand, and Thai soldiers poised for an assault on the heavily mined position. The Thais bombed and shelled the Vietnamese before an infantry operation was to be launched in the Banthad Mountain range, 170 miles southeast of Bangkok. The Vietnamese were dug in along the hill and had laid a string of mines to counter any Thai ground assaults. Seven Thai soldiers were killed and at least 16 injured. Radio Hanoi reported a Vietnamese Foreign Ministry statement denying the latest reported incursion into Thailand. Thailand accused Vietnam of at least 40 cross-border forays in search of Cambodian guerrillas since November 1984, but the Vietnamese government had denied the charges.
- 15 May: Vietnamese and Thai soldiers clashed for about eight hours with mortars, antitank cannons and machine guns.
- 17 May: Thai soldiers drove intruding Vietnamese soldiers back into Cambodia in intense fighting along Thailand's southeastern border. After more than a week of fighting, Thai rangers and marines seized part of a Vietnamese-occupied hill just inside the Thai border the previous days.
- May: An approximate 230,000 Khmer civilians were in temporary evacuations in Thailand after a very successful Vietnamese dry season offensive.
- 26 May: Vietnamese soldiers crossed into the Thai province of Ubon Ratchathani from northern Cambodia, apparently searching for Cambodian guerrillas. A Vietnamese force killed five Thai soldiers and a civilian in a one-hour clash with Thai border patrols in northeast Thailand. The fighting prompted Thai provincial authorities to evacuate about 600 civilians from two border villages to safer areas in the Nam Yuen district.
- 13 June: Thai forces battled 400 Vietnamese troops who crossed into Thailand.

=== 1986 ===
- 23 January: A Vietnamese barrage was aimed at a Thai marine outpost in Haad Lek, a village at the southern tip of the border. The Vietnamese fire came from a hill overlooking Haad Lek, inside Cambodian territory. "This appears to be a deliberate provocation by the Vietnamese", a Thai Navy spokesman said. "It does not look like a spillover of fighting inside Cambodia." A Thai warship in the Gulf of Thailand responded by shelling the Vietnamese artillery base. The warship fired more than 100 shells and the Vietnamese more than 70 shells.
- 25 January: Vietnamese heavy guns pounded a Thai border post, killing three Marines and causing an artillery battle with a Thai warship offshore.
- 7 December: Vietnamese troops warned Thailand against continuing to support Cambodian guerrillas. A loudspeaker broadcast and leaflets shot from cannon near Aranyaprathet District appealed to Thailand to refuse sanctuary to the guerrillas and warned that it would bear the "consequences" if it refuses.

=== 1987 ===
- 25 March: Thai Army Commander-in-Chief General Chavalit Yongchaiyudh announces an all-out offensive against Vietnamese troops who have intruded into Thai territory beyond the set 5 km limit.
- 17 April: Thai forces tried to oust Vietnamese infantry from Chong Bok, a mountainous region where the borders of Thailand, Laos and Cambodia converge. Casualties in double figures are reported on both sides.
- 30 May: Thai Rangers patrol the Chong Bok region where fighting has raged to dislodge Vietnamese from entrenched positions just inside Thai territory.
- Mid-1987: The 800-kilometre Thai-Cambodian border was fully garrisoned by Vietnamese and Cambodian forces.

=== 1988 ===
- 22 April: Vietnamese troops crossed the border and ambushed a company of border police, killing four Thai soldiers and wounding another. The company of five Thai police was patrolling a strategic point near the border in Buriram Province, 174 miles east of Bangkok, when a Vietnamese soldier hurled a grenade into the group and opened fire with rifles. The Vietnamese soldiers were more than 500 yards inside Thai territory when they staged the attack.
- 12 June: At about 9 a.m., Vietnamese 105mm and 85mm artillery shelled a Thai village, killing two villagers and wounding two others. Six artillery shells struck four miles deep inside Thailand.
- 4 August: The leader of the Chart Thai Party, General Chatichai Choonhavan, becomes the 17th Prime Minister of Thailand, he promises "to turn battlefields into market places".

=== 1989 ===
- 26 April: Vietnamese troops fired four artillery shells into Site Two, the largest of the Cambodian refugee camps with a population of more than 198,000. Three people were severely wounded. After the shelling, the camp was reportedly closed to Western aid officials, including members of the United Nations Border Relief Operation, which provided aid for the camp.
- September–December: Vietnamese troops withdrew from Cambodia.

== See also ==
- K5 Plan
- Battle of Rạch Gầm-Xoài Mút
- Siamese–Vietnamese War (1831–34)
- Siamese–Vietnamese War (1841–45)
- Dangrek genocide
- Koh Kong Thai Displacement Campaign
