= Liberal Democratic Party (Cambodia) =

- Leader: Sak Sutsakhan
- Founded: 1990; 36 years ago
- Preceded by: Khmer People's National Liberation Front
- Ideology: Republicanism; Khmer nationalism Anti-communism; Democratic capitalism Conservatism
- Political position: Right-wing

Party flag

The Liberal Democratic Party was a Cambodian political party founded in May 1990 by Sak Sutsakhan, a former commander in the Khmer People's National Liberation Armed Forces. The party was notably the first political party in Cambodia to hold a party congress following the 1991 Paris Peace Agreements.

== History ==
The party was created after infighting between Sutsakhan and Son Sann following the Paris Peace Accords of 1991 led Sutsakhan to split from the Khmer People's National Liberation Front (KPNLF), an anti-communist group originally started by Son Sann. In 1992, the Liberal Democratic Party held a party congress at Phnom Penh Olympic Stadium.

The Liberal Democratic Party won 62,698 votes (1.6%) in the 1993 national election, failing to win a single seat in the National Assembly.
