= Son Kuy =

Governor of Preah Trapeang

Chavay Kuy
- Born: Oknha Son Kuy (legend)
- Died: 1841; Kampuchea Krom
- Other name: Son Kuy
- Occupation: Governor of Trapeang province
- Known for: a historical hero of the Khmer Krom community who sacrificed his life in 1841 to protect Khmer culture, traditions, and Buddhism in southern Vietnam. (Being executed by Vietnamese)

Son Kuy or Chavay Kuy (Khmer: ចៅហ្វាយ គុយ), also known as Oknha Son Kuy (Khmer: សឺន គុយ), was the governor of the Khmer province of Trapeang (now Trà Vinh). He was beheaded by Emperor Thiệu Trị of the Nguyễn dynasty in 1841, in exchange for preserving the cultural tradition for the Khmer Krom. Nowadays, the figure of Chavay Kuy has become a rallying call and a symbol of the separatist intent of the current Khmer Krom.

== Life ==
=== Birth and early life ===
Chavay Kuy joined the army at age 20. He married a Cambodian woman named Phoeun in Chap Phleung village, Preah Trapeang province, in the modern-day province of Trà Vinh in Vietnam. He worked as a governor of that province which was still under the Cambodian king.

=== Battle for Kampuchea Krom ===
During the reign of the emperor of Vietnam, Thiệu Trị, The Vietnamese came and oppressed the Khmers in what is now Southern Vietnam, forcing the Khmer Krom to abandon their Buddhist religion, custom, tradition, and language. The Vietnamese garrisons were commanded by Thy Ché. The latter ordered Ong Lov, an army commander, to attack the old Khmer province of Preah Trapeang. Five hundred Khmer pagodas resisted the Vietnamese oppression and Okhnya Kuy was their leader. Oknha Son Kuy had 5 close associates in arms: Phuchhuoy (or District Administrator) Kong, Mr.Meun Ek, Mr. Ta Mong, Mr. Tesa Saom (some called him Ansa Saom) and Mr. Ta Mono Ros. They courageously fought to deter the invading Vietnamese army alongside Oknha Son Kuy. Oknha Son Kuy was married in Preah Trapeang Provincial City to Miss Phoeun, daughter of Khmer farmers.

=== Death ===
Chavay Kuy was defeated and ordered by the Court of Huế to be beheaded by the Vietnamese soldiers in 1841. His remains are in Preah Trapeang (Trà Vinh). In a modernist reinterpretation, others say that as a pacifist leader, Chauvay Son Kuy as leader of the Khmer Krom leader gave up his life in exchange for preservation of the Khmer Krom's religion, rights and freedoms.

Following his decapitation, an uprising of Khmer Krom peasants suffered from the retaliation of the Vietnamese authorities without any supports from King Ang Duong.

== Legacy ==
=== Last words ===
Son Kuy's last word are famous in Cambodia, as the last words of Louis XVI in France before being guillotined. Whether they are original or apocrypha remains to be determined, but they remain as a legacy of Khmer pride and heritage:

“I am deeply moved to be seeing [our] compatriots and Buddhist monks before I depart this life. I beg for your forgiveness from [our] compatriots and their Venerable Buddhist monks for I did not possess sufficient ability to serve our Motherland any better. Therefore I must end my life so that our [Khmer] Nation lives on without an inch of remorse. Now our custom, tradition, culture and Khmer Buddhism have been defended. Therefore, may the Venerable Buddhist Monks and all compatriots preserve, defend, protect and guard them religiously from perishing. May the Venerable Buddhist Monks and compatriots remember and understand clearly that our Khmer race used to be superior and widely known throughout the world. Therefore we must be firm and united always, let us not believe the snares of the enemy, let us not sell ourselves to any enemy so that they can kill our own nation and compatriots for personal interests. In the end, I believe clearly that I, as an individual, I die, but there will be millions of future Khmer children and compatriots, highly patriotic and bravely willing to sacrifice, die, defend, protect, guard and preserve the national sovereignty, liberty, Buddhism and Khmer race so they can live on.”

Along with other mythical heroes of Cambodia such as Khleang Moeung, "Oknha Son Kuy" was chosen as the name of one of the non-communist resistance group in the 1970s. He has become a constant reference for the Khmer Krom, as the forerunner of this cultural struggle, as most recently illustrated in the report by the Khmers Kampuchea-Krom Federation submitted on June 10, 2016 to the United Nations Special Rapporteur in the field of Cultural Rights concerning the intentional destruction of cultural heritage.

=== Legend of the upside-down chheu teal tree ===
In 1821, it is said that Chavay Kuy planted a rare chheu teal tree upside down. According to legend if the tree thrived, that would mean Khmer Krom would thrive as well. This tree is still identified by locals in Preah Trapeang province, in the modern-day province of Trà Vinh in Vietnam.

=== Pagoda of Preah Trapeang ===
Wat Bo Sal Reac, situated in the provincial seat of Preah Trapeang (Trà Vinh), was patronized by the family of Son Sann, a Cambodian resistance leader, in a desire to renew the site as a place of memory of Son Kuy. Son San had served as prime minister under Sihanouk and had led a major faction of the resistance against post-Khmer Rouge Vietnamese occupation of Cambodia. Son Sann was believed to the direct grandson of Son Kuy, whose stupa is kept at the pagoda. The completion of Oknha Kuy's stupa became a symbol for the healing of the racial rift between Kampuchea Krom and Vietnam.
