= Ieng Mouly =

Cambodian politician

Ieng Mouly (born 1950, Prey Veng Province, Cambodia, French Indochina) is a Cambodian politician.

== Biography ==
=== Early life ===
Ieng Mouly was born on November 2, 1950, in Pearang in the province of Prey Veng to a family of local merchants, growing up during the golden years of the Cambodian Sangkum led by Norodom Sihanouk. His family was already politically active as his father had been a member of the pre-1955 Democratic Party. His parents encouraged him to further his studies and, in 1968, he obtained a diploma in business in from the Royal University of Phnom Penh and later in 1970, a certificate in accounting. From 1968 to 1970, he worked as an accountant for the national liquor company known as SKD (Société Khmer des Distilleries) before moving on to management control and financial auditor for the Sokilait, a milk factory on the riverfront along Russey Keo Road.

=== Exile in France ===
In the context of the Cambodian Civil War, Mouly Eng fled to France where he was welcomed as a refugee in 1973. He received further training from the National of Institute of Accounting and Economic Skills (CNAM - Institut National des Techniques Économique et Comptable) and began working as an accountant for Pierrefitte, a local French company until 1982.

=== Return to Cambodia ===
In 1982, Ieng Mouly left Paris to live on the Thai borders with the refugees. He thus entered Cambodian politics as he became the assistant of the president of the Khmer People's National Liberation Front in opposition to the Vietnamese-installed People's Republic of Kampuchea (PRK) regime in Cambodia. In March 1988, he became the secretary general of that party. During the short-live transitional State of Cambodia (1989–1993), he was part of the National Supreme Council in charge of preparing the 1993 and the return of democracy in Cambodia. He was one of the signatories of the 1991 Paris Peace Agreements.

Close to Son Sann and his son Son Soubert, Ieng became the vice-president of the Buddhist Liberal Democratic Party and was elected as a representative to the National Assembly in the Cambodian general election on June 10, 1993. In a power struggle between Hun Sen and Prince Norodom Rannaridh, Ieng did not give a vote of confidence to the government formed in July 1993.

As an influential and respected member of the opposition, he was chosen to head the Cambodian Mine Action Centre. He was appointed Minister of Information by the coalition government of Cambodia by virtue of the new Constitution approved in December 1993. In that position, he had to deal with the tragic hostage situation of the foreigners kidnapped in Phnom Voar on their train journey from Phnom Penh to Kep in November 1994.

Ieng took the presidency of the Buddhist Liberal Democratic Party in 1995. The party eventually split through tensions in 1997. However, in the 1998 general election, he failed to win any seats and lost the 10 seats which Son Sann had won in 1993. After that, it was clear that while the faction led by Son Sann was leaning closer to the royalist FUNCINPEC party, Ieng Mouly was coming closer to the leadership of Prime Minister Hun Sen.

=== Reconcilement with Hun Sen ===
Ieng Mouly is currently working with the government of Cambodia as a senior minister at the Council of Ministers. As peace and stability returned to Cambodia, Ieng Mouly went from being a leader of the opposition to being a member of the Cambodian People's Party government, noting that it was not a matter of being opposed to communists any more: "we are all capitalists. We either have capitalism with state intervention, or laissez-faire capitalism."

== AIDS campaign ==
Besides his involvement in the politics of the Kingdom of Cambodia, Ieng Mouly is most well known for his long-standing commitment in the fights against the spread of AIDS and other sexually transmitted diseases in Cambodia. As the head of the National AIDS Authority, he has given more importance to "collaboration with civil society and also with local people at the community level” implementing a community-based HIV testing program which is one of the first of its kind in Asia and the Pacific.

However, Ieng Mouly has shown a rather permissive stance on prostitution, opposing the incarceration of sex workers in Cambodia. Echoing the words of Augustine of Hippo in the 5th century who famously argued that if prostitution is removed from human affairs, the government will unsettle everything because of lust, Ieng Mouly affirmed that “[the police] should open one eye, and close the other. As long as [sex workers] don’t do anything that could provoke social disorder, they shouldn’t disturb or arrest them or put them in jail.”
