= Khmer People's National Liberation Front =

Khmer People's National Liberation Front រណសិរ្សរំដោះជាតិប្រជាជនខ្មែរ
- President: Son Sann
- Founder: Son Sann
- Founded: 9 October 1979; 46 years ago
- Dissolved: 1987; 39 years ago (de facto); 1993; 33 years ago (de jure)
- Succeeded by: BLDP; LDP
- Armed wing: KPNLAF
- Ideology: Khmer nationalism Economic liberalism Anti-communism; Lon Nol loyalism
- Political position: Right-wing
- National affiliation: CGDK

Party flag

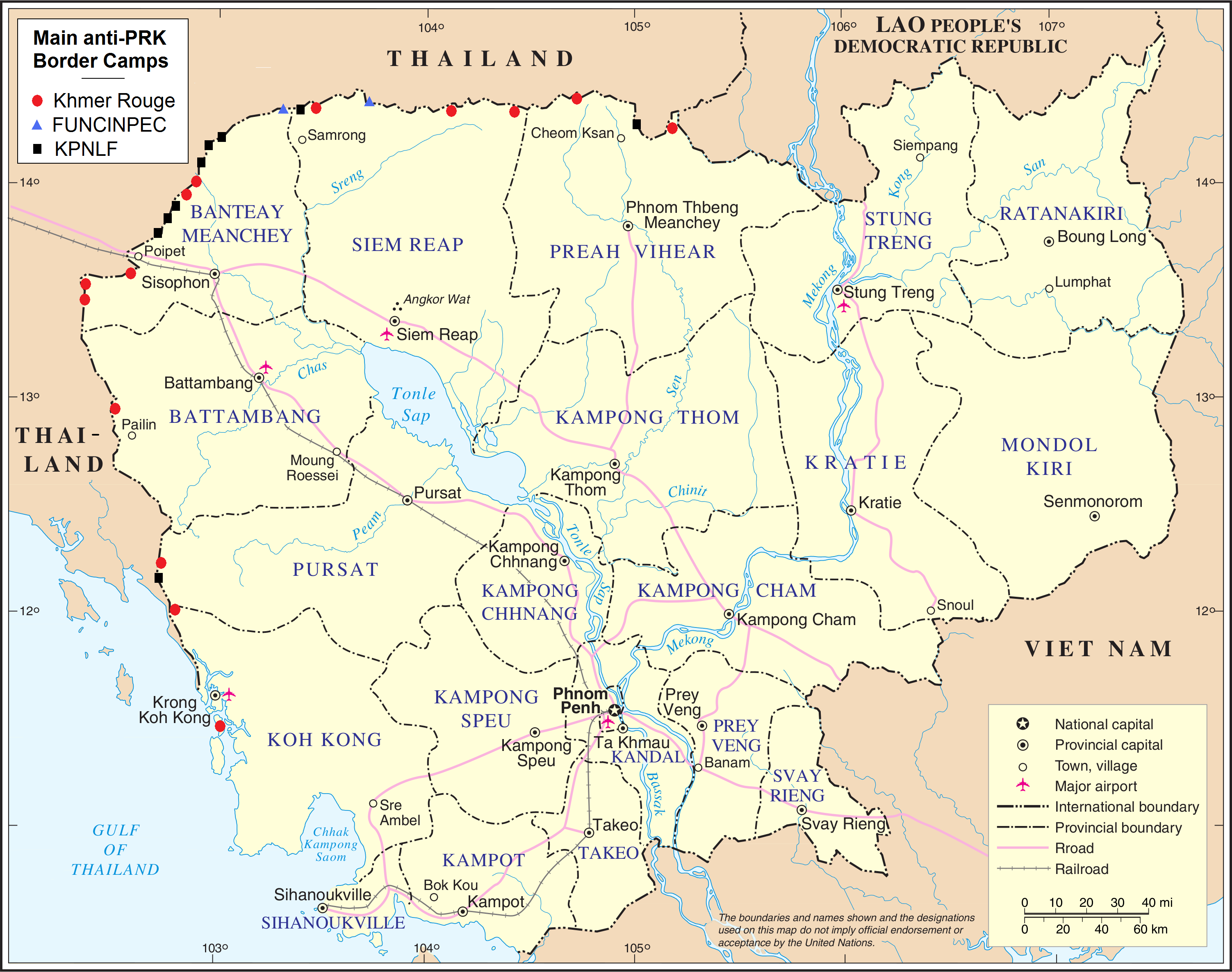
Border camps hostile to the PRK; 1979–1984. KPNLF camps shown in black.

The Khmer People's National Liberation Front (KPNLF, Khmer: រណសិរ្សរំដោះជាតិប្រជាជនខ្មែរ) was a political front organized in 1979 in opposition to the Vietnamese-installed People's Republic of Kampuchea (PRK) regime in Cambodia. The 200,000 Vietnamese troops supporting the PRK, as well as Khmer Rouge defectors, had ousted the Democratic Kampuchea regime of Pol Pot, and were initially welcomed by the majority of Cambodians as liberators. Some Khmer, though, recalled the two countries' historical rivalry and feared that the Vietnamese would attempt to subjugate the country, and began to oppose their military presence. Members of the KPNLF supported this view.

== Origins ==
On 5 January 1979 a "Committee for a Neutral and Independent Cambodia" (Comité pour un Cambodge Neutre et Indépendant, CCNI) was established in Paris composed of Son Sann (a leading Cambodian neutralist, ex-President of the National Bank of Cambodia, and Prime Minister from 1967 to 1968), Sim Var, Yem Sambaur, Hhiek Tioulong, Nong Kimmy, Thonn Ouk and Chai Thoul. It issued a six-point declaration condemning the Khmer Rouge and the "North Vietnamese Aggression", urged adherence to the 1954 Geneva Accords and 1973 Paris Peace Conference proposals, demanded an immediate ceasefire in Cambodia, and the establishment of a democratically elected government to be established following a referendum.

Vietnam had invaded Democratic Kampuchea in December 1978 and entered Phnom Penh on 6 January 1979. Immediately the Royal Thai Government approached Son Sann with offers of support for a non-communist resistance force. Son Sann, in turn, flew to New York City to ask Prince Norodom Sihanouk (who was preparing to address the UN General Assembly) to lead the KPNLF, but Sihanouk declined and even refused his support.

In February 1979, General Dien Del and Nguon Pythoureth flew to Thailand to form the Khmer People's National Liberation Armed Forces (KPNLAF). The two went from camp to camp persuading local leaders to join. Those who agreed to fight under Son Sann were Chea Chhut (at Nong Chan), ex-Khmer National Armed Forces Colonel Prum Vith, Ta Maing and Om Luot (at Nong Samet). By mid-1979, there were 1600 armed soldiers in the KPNLAF.

In August 1979 Son Sann went to Thailand with his sons (Son Soubert and Son Monir), Neang Chin Han (former Director of the Executive Cabinet under President Lon Nol), Madame Suon Kaset Sokhomaly, Colonel Thou Thip, Colonel Ea Chuor Kim Meng, Suon Sophat and Buon Say, all from France. The KPNLF was proclaimed on 9 October at Sok Sann, a camp in the jungles of the Cardamom Mountains that contained "barely 2000 men" and was a merger of 13 quite disparate groups such as the Khleang Moeung (500 men), Cobra (led by Colonel Prum Vith) and Khmer Islam Movement, the Prey Veng, the Nationalist Movement, Oknha Son Kuy, Kauv Tjlok, the Khmer Neutralist Movement, the Black Indra, United Free Khmer, ASW, Tonle Bassak, and the Kompong Thom Movement. The following month the first shipment of 3000 rifles arrived from Beijing. Son Sann assumed the leadership of the KPNLF together with an executive committee and a military council.

The KPNLF was thus established as a right-wing, pro-Western, anti-Communist political faction in opposition to the Vietnamese-installed and backed People's Republic of Kampuchea.

US President Ronald Reagan authorized the provision of aid to KPNLF in an effort to force an end to the Vietnamese occupation. In 1982, the U.S. government initiated a covert aid program to the non-communist resistance (NCR) amounting to $5 million per year, ostensibly for non-lethal aid only. This amount was increased to $8 million in 1984 and $12 million in 1987 and 1988. In late 1988, the United States pared back CIA funding to $8 million, following reports that $3.5 million had been diverted by the Thai military. At the same time, the Reagan Administration gave new flexibility to the funds, permitting the NCR to purchase US-made weapons in Singapore and other regional markets. In 1985, the United States established a separate, overt aid program to the non-communist resistance which came to be known as the Solarz Fund after one of its chief sponsors, Rep. Stephen Solarz. The overt aid program channeled about $5 million per year of humanitarian aid to the non-communist resistance through USAID.

== Political force prior to the Paris Peace Accords ==
Since its beginning, the KPNLF had depended on international financial aid to help maintain their civilian camps and carry out military operations. Sann was critical for gathering this financial aid, as well as increasing international awareness of KPNLF's cause. In fact, in 1982 he went on a fundraising trip to the United States and Europe. Sann was very popular with his quiet, humble demeanor and engaging personality. In addition to Sann's trips, the KPNLF trumpeted their status as the first non-communist anti-PRK faction inside of Cambodia. This increased financial aid because it appealed to the "Western" forces that were interested in ousting the Vietnamese yet not supporting the Khmer Rouge.

In order to increase their political clout and legitimacy, the KPNLF joined with the Khmer Rouge (at this point in time officially called the Party of Democratic Kampuchea) and Prince Sihanouk's United National Front for an Independent, Neutral, Peaceful, and Co-operative Cambodia (FUNCINPEC) to form the Coalition Government of Democratic Kampuchea (CGDK). Even though both the KPNLF and FUNCINPEC did not agree with the Khmer Rouge's philosophy and methodology, they still joined the CGDK for the increased international legitimacy and recognition. This increase came because it appeared as if native Cambodians were putting aside their differences and banding together to remove a foreign occupier. In fact, some believe that this coalition was formed in part due to external pressures because the CGDK was allowed to occupy the Cambodian seat in the UN, even though the coalition lacked the normal prerequisites for such recognition.

== Military force ==
The military branch of the KPNLF was the Khmer People's National Liberation Armed Forces (KPNLAF). Established originally in March 1979 by General Dien Del, it was commanded by Sak Sutsakhan from 1981–1992 (with the exception of some power struggles). However, in an individual unit the commander was relatively autonomous, therefore General Sak had the difficult job of coordinating the actions of each unit. This understandably led to a lot of confusion and relative ineffectiveness for large-scale battles. On the other hand, this organization reaped benefits in the form of greater flexibility and mobility of the armed forces.

Despite this military tendency to act in the form of individual unit attacks, occasionally the KPNLAF would join with other separatist forces to launch a large-scale assault on a specific target or area. For example, on March 28, 1986 the CGDK launched a successful raid on Battambang, Cambodia's second largest city.

For the KPNLAF large-scale military actions were stopped after the Vietnamese dry season offensive in 1984–85. These attacks were devastating, yet not completely debilitating. Even after the huge loss of approximately 30% of its men and material, the KPNLAF was still able to carry out guerrilla operations for the rest of its existence.

== Infighting before the Paris Peace Accords ==
As with many political groups, the KPNLF had its fair share of party infighting. During its history, two major divides have occurred: one before the Paris Peace Accords in 1991 and one after the UN-backed elections of 1993.

Public knowledge of the first divide began in late December 1985. On one side was Son Sann, president of the faction. On the other side were the usurpers led by military commander Sak Sutsakhan, his chief of staff Dien Del, and party members Abdul Gaffar Peang Meth and Hing Kunthorn. The dissenters' charges against Sann included an unwillingness to attack the Vietnamese in coordination with Sihanouk's forces and supposed meddling in military affairs, both of which led to greater military impotence. They also accused Sann of being undemocratic and "ruling with an iron fist."

On 2 January the dissidents released a statement saying that they had control of the faction. Dien Del and Sutsakhan had formed the Provisional Central Committee of Salvation whose function was to command the party. Sann then released a counter-statement saying the actions of Dien and Sutsakhan were both illegal and against the spirit of the party, but that they would still be welcomed back to the party if they stopped this divisive action. On the other hand, for Abdul Gaffar Peang Meth and Hing Kunthorn, Sann believed that disciplinary action was necessary in order to rejoin the party. Sann continued on and said he had the support of the United States, ASEAN, and China (the three major financial backers of the KPNLF).

However, the infighting continued because neither side had the power to defeat the other. As the months wore on, Thai authorities became concerned with the KPNLF and in particular, the KPNLAF's abilities to wage war against the PRK because of divided leadership. Therefore, the Thais helped establish (in March 1986) a 10-member provisional military committee without the knowledge of Sutsakhan or Sann. The committee's purpose was to command the military operations of the KPNLAF until the conflict was over. Members of the committee included Dien Del from the Sutsakhan camp and the new head of Sann's Command committee, Prum Vith.

The dissidence was finally resolved with the help of a third party. While Sann was allowed to keep the title of the presidency and many of the civilian powers that go with it, Sutsakhan retained his military command of both the faction and joint operations between the KPNLAF and FUNCINPEC. However, the peace did not last forever, and after the Paris Peace Accords were implemented Sutsakhan formed the Liberal Democratic Party, an offshoot political branch of the KPNLF.

== Life after the Paris Peace Accords ==
In 1991, France and Indonesia called for a peace conference about the civil war in Cambodia. All four factions inside of Cambodia attended, as well as the UN and many prominent foreign nations (e.g., United States, the Soviet Union, China, and the United Kingdom). The goal of the conference was to establish a united, peaceful, and neutral democracy in Cambodia. In October 1991, all attending parties signed the Paris Peace Agreement.

The agreement called for UN sanctioned elections in 1993 to determine the future government of Cambodia. During the time span in between the signing of the peace agreement and the election, Cambodia would be watched over by the United Nations Transitional Authority in Cambodia (UNTAC). The peace agreement stipulated that all four factions must cooperate with UNTAC to slowly disarm their fighting forces. All of the factions did so except for the Khmer Rouge, who then protested and did not partake in the election.

The necessity to change from a military faction to a political party facilitated a name change. The Khmer People's National Liberation Front became the Buddhist Liberal Democratic Party. The name change did not result from a deviation in the platform or structure of the KPNLF, with the exception of the loss of the KPNLAF and the previously mentioned Sutsakhan breakaway party. The BLDP was still led by Son Sann, and in the UN sanctioned elections of 1993 the BLDP won 10 out of 120 seats in the National Assembly.

Due to the inability of any one party to win an absolute majority, the BLDP became a junior member of a coalition government with the Cambodian People's Party (formerly the PRK) and FUNCINPEC. Being a part of the coalition entitled the party to a position in the power-sharing cabinet and an important chair on a commission for the National Assembly (e.g., Ieng Mouly was the Minister of Information, and Kem Sokha was chairman on the National Assembly's Human Rights Commission.)

== Infighting after the Paris Peace Accords and the dismantling of the BLDP ==
As in early 1986, there was a dissension among the party ranks in 1995. However, this time it was not a disagreement between military and political control, but a conflict between two politicians: Son Sann and Ieng Mouly.

According to sources, Sann and Mouly had been arguing about different topics for many years. Some of their more vocal disagreements were: Sann being fiercely anti-Vietnamese, Sann's hasty rescinded order to boycott the 1993 UN elections, and Mouly's questioning of the appropriateness of the Cambodian monarchy being involved in the new democracy.

Despite these differences and many more not mentioned, Mouly and Sann reached a type of power-sharing agreement after the 1993 elections. In exchange for Sann remaining the head of the party, Mouly would get the party's only cabinet position (minister of information). The two decided on this arrangement because it was better to keep the BLDP together, rather than split and lose the party's legislative power, as well as its position in the power sharing coalition.

However this arrangement did not last very long, for in 1995 the two sides quarreled. To begin with, Sann constantly supported anti-Vietnamese legislation. This irritated Mouly and his supporters, essentially keeping tension between the two groups from subsiding. The boiling point was finally reached when Sann supporters announced that Mouly had been kicked out of the party. This set off a firestorm and Mouly's side immediately responded in kind, stating the opposite: Sann, instead of Mouly, had been removed from the party.

As time passed, the latter turned out to be true. On 9 July 1995, Ieng Mouly summoned a special congress of the BLDP in order to select new leadership. Due to the non-attendance of Son Sann and his supporters, Mouly was elected unanimously by the congress. However, shortly after the congress, the BLDP dissolved. Mouly went on to become leader of the Liberal Democratic Party and Sann's supporters created the Son Sann party. Neither side has won a seat in the National Assembly since the split.
