= Buddhist Liberal Democratic Party =

Buddhist Liberal Democratic Party គណបក្សប្រជាធិបតេយ្យសេរីនិយមព្រះពុទ្ធសាសនា
- Leader: Son Sann
- Founded: 1993
- Dissolved: 1997
- Preceded by: Khmer People's National Liberation Front
- Ideology: Conservatism; Monarchism; Buddhist socialism
- Political position: Centre-right
- Religion: Theravada Buddhism

The Buddhist Liberal Democratic Party (BLDP; Khmer: គណបក្សប្រជាធិបតេយ្យសេរីនិយមព្រះពុទ្ធសាសនា) was a Cambodian political party founded in 1993 by former Cambodian Prime Minister Son Sann. The BLDP was created as a successor to the Khmer People's National Liberation Front (KPNLF), an anti-communist group also started by Son Sann.

== 1993 Cambodian election ==
The BLDP won ten seats in the 1993 Cambodian election, and partnered in the resulting coalition government with the Funcinpec and the Cambodian People's Party.

== Split ==
Rivalry between Son Sann and fellow party leader Ieng Mouly led to a split within the party that resulted in its dissolution in 1997. In 1998, Ieng Mouly's faction formed the Buddhist Liberal Party, while Son Sann's supporters created the Son Sann Party. Both successor parties failed to capture even a single seat in the 1998 election. The BLDP was a founding body of the Council of Asian Liberals and Democrats.

== General election results ==
Election	Leader	Votes			Seats		Position	Government
Election	Leader	#	%	±	#	±	Position	Government
1993	Son Sann	152,764	3.8	▲3.8	10 / 120	▲10	▲3rd	FUNCINPEC–CPP–BLDP
1998	Ieng Mouly	45,849	0.9	▼2.9	0 / 122	▼10	▼7th	CPP–FUNCINPEC
