= Coalition Government of Democratic Kampuchea =

Cambodian government in exile, 1982–1992

Coalition Government of Democratic Kampuchea (1982–1990) National Government of Cambodia (1990–1993)
- Cabinet of Democratic Kampuchea in exile
- Date formed: 22 June 1982
- Date dissolved: c. May 1993

People and organisations
- President of Democratic Kampuchea: Norodom Sihanouk (1982–1987)
- Prime Minister: Son Sann (1982–1991/1992)

The Coalition Government of Democratic Kampuchea (CGDK; Khmer: រដ្ឋាភិបាលចំរុះកម្ពុជាប្រជាធិបតេយ្យ, Rôdthaphĭbál Châmrŏh Kâmpŭchéa Prâchéathĭbâtéyy), renamed in 1990 to the National Government of Cambodia (NGC; រដ្ឋាភិបាលជាតិនៃកម្ពុជា, Rôdthaphĭbál Chéatĕ Ney Kâmpŭchéa), was a coalition government in exile composed of three Cambodian political factions, namely Prince Norodom Sihanouk's FUNCINPEC party, the Party of Democratic Kampuchea (PDK; often referred to as the Khmer Rouge) and the Khmer People's National Liberation Front (KPNLF) formed in 1982, broadening the deposed Democratic Kampuchea led by the Khmer Rouge. For most of its existence, it was the UN-recognized government of Cambodia, despite being a government-in-exile. The de facto government at Phnom Penh continued to be the Vietnamese-backed People's Republic of Kampuchea.

== International recognition ==
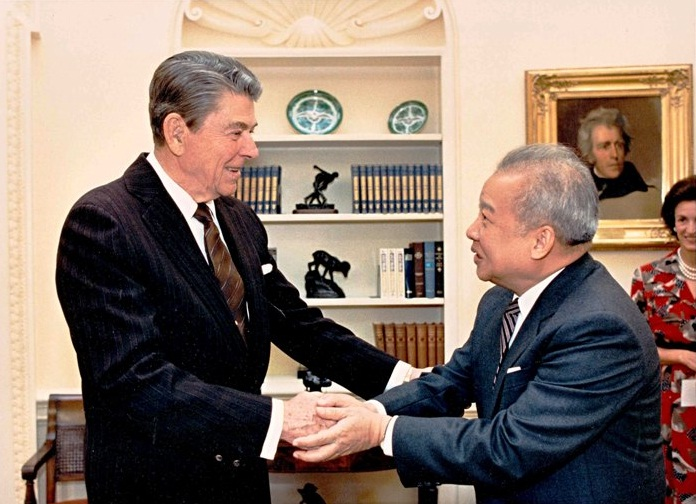
Prince Norodom Sihanouk, for many the recognised leader of Cambodia, pictured with US President Ronald Reagan in the Oval Office, 11 October 1988.

The signing ceremony of the coalition took place in Kuala Lumpur on 22 June 1982. The president of the coalition was Prince Norodom Sihanouk, the prime minister was the KPNLF leader Son Sann and the foreign secretary was PDK leader Khieu Samphan.

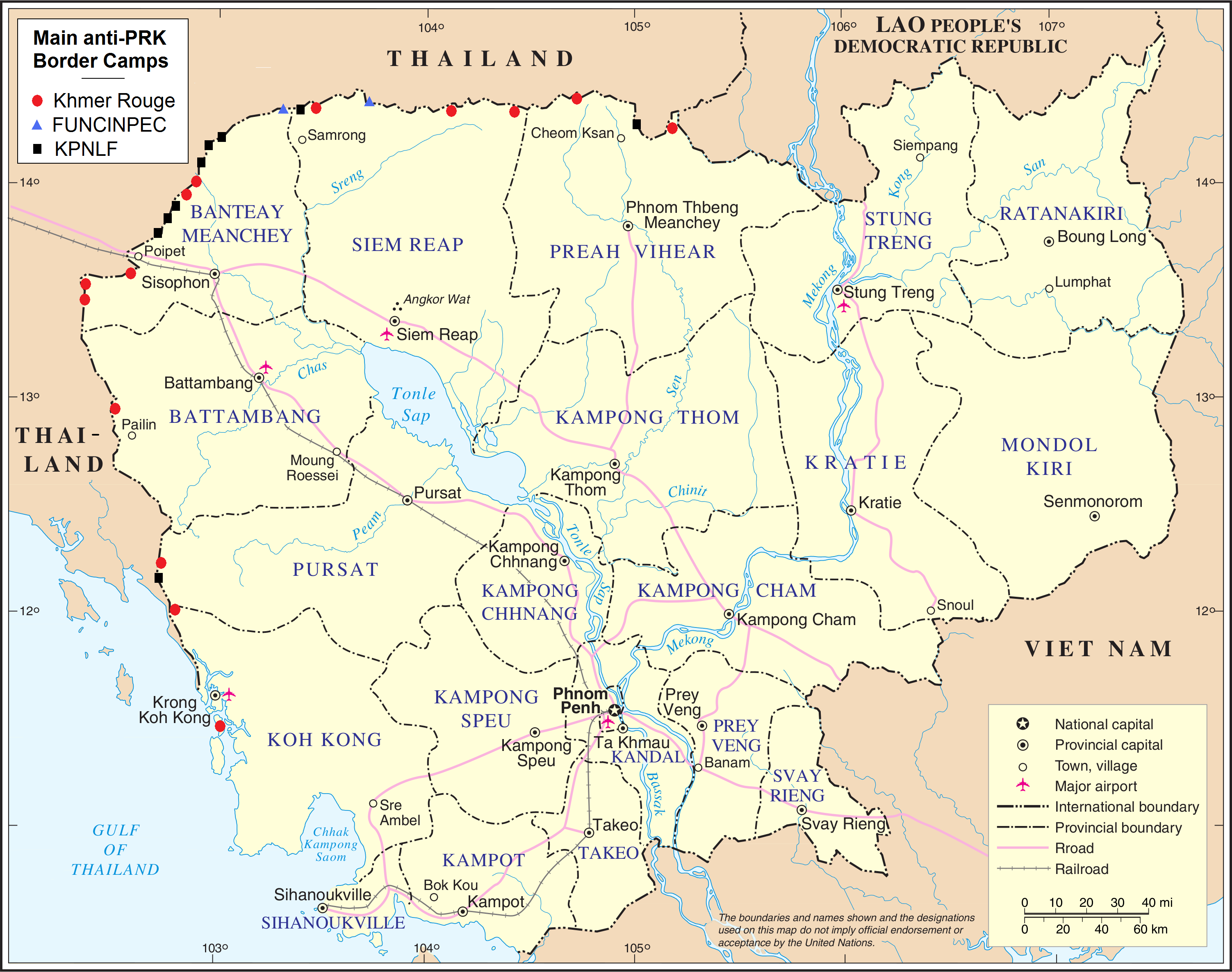
Camps on the Thai-Cambodian border hostile to the People's Republic of Kampuchea, 1979–1984

The CGDK was allowed to retain the Cambodian/Kampuchean seat in the United Nations on the premise that it was a legitimate Cambodian government in contrast to the pro-Vietnamese/pro-Soviet People's Republic of Kampuchea. The Western states had previously opposed proposals by the Eastern Bloc countries to replace the Khmer Rouge-held seat of Cambodia by the representation of the Vietnamese-installed government.

The United Nations General Assembly voted on 14 November 1979 on the proposed ouster of Democratic Kampuchea: 91 rejected the proposal, there were 29 countries in favour and 26 abstentions. In contrast, the results on 18 September 1981 had been 77–37–31. The CGDK was also recognised by North Korea, whose leader, Kim Il-Sung had offered Sihanouk sanctuary with China. During a meeting in Pyongyang between Kim Il-sung and Sihanouk on 10 April 1986, Kim Il-Sung reassured Sihanouk that North Korea would continue to regard him as the legitimate head of state of Cambodia.

== History ==
After the Khmer Rouge was overthrown, Chinese leader Deng Xiaoping was unhappy with Vietnam's influence over the PRK government. Deng proposed to Sihanouk that he co-operate with the Khmer Rouge to overthrow the PRK government, but Sihanouk rejected it, as he opposed the genocidal policies pursued by the Khmer Rouge while they were in power. In March 1981, Sihanouk established a resistance movement, FUNCINPEC, which was complemented by a small resistance army known as Armée Nationale Sihanoukiste (ANS). He appointed In Tam, who had briefly served as prime minister in the Khmer Republic, as the commander-in-chief of ANS.

The ANS needed military aid from China, and Deng seized the opportunity to sway Sihanouk into collaborating with the Khmer Rouge. Sihanouk reluctantly agreed, and started talks in March 1981 with the Khmer Rouge and the Son Sann-led KPNLF on a unified anti-PRK resistance movement. After several rounds of negotiations mediated by Deng and Singapore's prime minister Lee Kuan Yew, FUNCINPEC, KPNLF, and the Khmer Rouge agreed to form the CGDK in June 1982. The CGDK was headed by Sihanouk, and functioned as a government-in-exile.

Prior to the formation of the CGDK political coalition, in the late 1980s and early 1990s the Sonn Sann and Sihanouk opposition forces, then known as the KPNLF and FUNCINPEC, drew some military and financial support from the United States, which sought to assist these two movements as part of the Reagan Doctrine effort to counter Soviet and Vietnamese involvement in Cambodia. In 1984 and 1985, the Vietnamese army's offensives severely weakened the CGDK troops' positions, in effect eliminating the two non-communist factions as military players, leaving the Khmer Rouge as the sole military force of importance of the CGDK.

One of the Reagan Doctrine's principal architects, The Heritage Foundation's Michael Johns, visited with Sonn Sann and Sihanouk forces in Cambodia in 1987 and returned to Washington urging expanded United States support for the KPNLF and the Sihanouk resistance forces as a third alternative to both the Vietnamese-installed and supported Cambodian government and the Khmer Rouge, which also was resisting the government.

Although the Khmer Rouge was for the most part isolated from diplomacy, their National Army of Democratic Kampuchea were the largest and most effective armed forces of the CGDK. In 1987, Prince Sihanouk proceeded to take a leave of absence from his position as the president of the CGDK, a move that raised the hopes of Hanoi and Moscow that he would depart the coalition.

In 1990, in the run up to the United Nations sponsored Paris Peace Agreement of 1991 the CGDK renamed itself the National Government of Cambodia. It was dissolved in 1993, a year which saw the United Nations Transitional Authority in Cambodia turn power over to the restored Kingdom of Cambodia. In July 1994, the Khmer Rouge would form an internationally unrecognised rival government known as the Provisional Government of National Union and National Salvation of Cambodia.

== See also ==
- GRUNK
- Cambodian-Vietnamese War
