= Son Sann =

22nd Prime Minister of Cambodia

Samdech Borvor Setha Thipadei Son Sann
- សឺន សាន
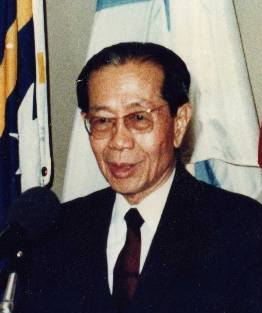

Prime Minister of Cambodia
- In office 1 May 1967 – 31 January 1968
- Monarch: Sisowath Kossamak
- President: Norodom Sihanouk
- Preceded by: Lon Nol
- Succeeded by: Penn Nouth

Governor of the National Bank of Cambodia
- In office 1955–1968
- Preceded by: Position established
- Succeeded by: Touch Kim

Deputy Prime Minister of Cambodia
- In office 25 July 1947 – 20 February 1948
- Prime Minister: Sisowath Watchayavong

Minister for Foreign Affairs
- In office 10 July 1958 – 19 April 1960
- Prime Minister: Norodom Sihanouk
- Preceded by: Truong Cang
- Succeeded by: Tep Phan

President of the National Assembly
- In office 14 June 1993 – 6 October 1993
- Monarch: Norodom Sihanouk
- Preceded by: Chea Sim
- Succeeded by: Chea Sim

President of the Buddhist Liberal Democratic Party
- In office 1991–1997
- Vice President: Ieng Mouly
- Preceded by: Position established
- Succeeded by: Ieng Mouly

Member of Parliament for Phnom Penh
- In office 1993–1997
- Preceded by: Constituency established
- Succeeded by: Thach Reng

Prime Minister of the CGDK
- In office 1982–1991
- Preceded by: Khieu Samphan (as Prime Minister of Democratic Kampuchea)
- Succeeded by: Hun Sen (as Prime Minister of Cambodia)

President of the KPNLF
- In office 1979–1993
- Preceded by: Position established
- Succeeded by: Position abolished

Personal details
- Born: 5 October 1911 Phnom Penh, Cambodia, French Indochina
- Died: 19 December 2000 (aged 89) Paris, France
- Party: Buddhist Liberal Democratic Party (1993–97); Khmer People's National Liberation Front (1979–93); Sangkum (1955–70); Democratic Party (1946–52)
- Spouse: Nema Toula Macchwa
- Children: 7
- Education: HEC Paris

Son Sann (Khmer: សឺន សាន, Sœn San [sɨːn saːn]; 5 October 1911 – 19 December 2000) was a Cambodian politician and anti-communist resistance leader who served as the 22nd Prime Minister of Cambodia (1967–68) and later as President of the National Assembly (1993). A devout Buddhist, he was married and fathered seven children. His full honorary title is "Samdech Borvor Setha Thipadei Son Sann" (Khmer: សម្តេចបវរសេដ្ឋាធិបតី សឺន សាន; lit. 'Great Lord and Most Eminent Leader Son Sann').

== Early life ==
Son Sann was born at Phnom Penh in 1911. Son Sann's family was of Khmer Krom background; both of his parents came from wealthy landowning families in the province of Trà Vinh, Vietnam. Son Sann's father, Son Sach moved to Cambodia prior to Son Sann's birth to serve as an official for Sisowath Souphanouvong, a brother of King Monivong. Son Sann studied in Phnom Penh and later Paris, where he graduated from the École des hautes études commerciales de Paris (HEC) in 1933. He briefly spent time in London, learning English in the process. Having returned to Cambodia in 1935, he joined the Civil Service, serving in the provinces of Prey Veng and later Battambang where he was in charge of trade. Son Sann was also a member of a Cambodian economic mission to Tokyo in 1941.

== Political career ==
An early supporter of the Khmer Democratic Party, Son Sann became a member of its steering committee. He served as the vice-president of the Council of Ministers and Minister of Finance in the Sisowath Youtévong government from 1946-47. Following the death of Youtévong he retained his post as vice-president of the council of ministers (effectively Deputy Premier) until February 1948 and in 1949, he was the vice chairman of the Council of Ministers. He became Foreign Minister in June 1950-March 1951. Following the "crushing" of the Democrat Party in 1952, he resigned from the leadership of the party. He re-entered politics as a member of the Sangkum party and served in several governments in the late 1950s to the early 1960s holding various posts before becoming president of the National Bank of Cambodia (1955–1968).

=== House arrest and France ===
Following the 1970 coup against Prince Norodom Sihanouk, Son Sann was placed under house arrest and later left for France. In June 1970 he went to Beijing to attempt a reconciliation between Sihanouk and Lon Nol, who had overthrown him. He continued with these efforts even after the October proclamation of the Khmer Republic and by late 1971 he had gained the support of politicians and diplomats in Cambodia, France and China. However, in 1972 the Chinese Premier Zhou Enlai denounced the initiative and Lon Nol responded by naming himself President of the Khmer Republic.

=== Return to Cambodia ===
In 1978, he formed the Khmer People's National Liberation Front (KPNLF) to unite anti-communist refugees on the Thai-Cambodia border following the 1978 Vietnamese invasion of Cambodia. The KPNLF later joined with the Armeè Nationale Sihanouk to form the non-communist resistance and in 1982, the KPNLF joined with Sihanouk and the Party of Democratic Kampuchea to form the Coalition Government of Democratic Kampuchea. Son Sann was named Prime Minister in the new coalition government.

=== United States support ===
In the late 1980s and early 1990s, Son Sann drew some limited military and financial support from the United States, which sought to assist his movement as part of the Reagan Doctrine effort to counter Soviet and Vietnamese involvement in Cambodia. One of the Reagan Doctrine's principal architects, The Heritage Foundation's Michael Johns, visited with Sonn Sann and KPNLF forces in Cambodia in 1987, and returned to Washington urging expanded U.S. support for the KPNLF and the resistance forces of Norodom Sihanouk as a third alternative to both the Vietnamese-installed and supported Cambodian government and the Khmer Rouge, which also was resisting the government. The U.S. responded by providing limited military and humanitarian aid to the Sonn Sann and Sihanouk resistance forces in Cambodia in an effort to pressure the Vietnamese to leave Cambodia and also to build a non-communist opposition alternative to the Khmer Rouge.

Following Cambodia's Paris Peace Agreement, Son Sann formed a new political party, the Buddhist Liberal Democratic Party in 1992 and participated in the 1993 elections. Son Sann was elected along with nine other members of the party and served as a minority member in the coalition government. He was President of the National Assembly from June to October 1993.

In 1997, Son Sann left Cambodia again for Paris, where he remained with his family until his death from heart failure, on 19 December 2000, at 89 years of age.

== Honour ==
=== Foreign honour ===
- Malaya : Honorary Commander of the Order of the Defender of the Realm (1963)

== Bibliography ==
- Corfield, Justin J. (1994). Khmers stand up! – A history of the Cambodian government 1970-1975. Centre of Southeast Asian Studies, Monash University. ISBN 0732605652.

Political offices
Preceded by Lon Nol	Prime Minister of Cambodia; 1967–1968	Succeeded by Penn Nouth
Preceded by Khieu Samphan	Prime Minister of Democratic Kampuchea; 1982–1991	Succeeded by Hun Sen; Premier of Cambodia
Preceded by Chea Sim	President of the National Assembly of Cambodia; 1993	Succeeded by Chea Sim
Party political offices
Preceded by None	Leader of the Khmer People’s National Liberation Front; 1979–1991	Succeeded by None
Preceded by None	President of the Buddhist Liberal Democratic Party; 1991–1997	Succeeded by None, party split
