= Yim Sovann =

Cambodian politician

Yim Sovann យឹម សុវណ្ណ
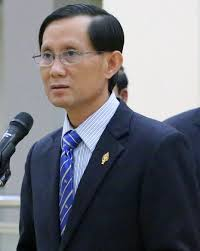

Deputy Leader of the Opposition
- In office 5 December 2016 – 31 January 2017
- Leader: Kem Sokha
- Preceded by: Kem Sokha
- Succeeded by: Position abolished

Member of Parliament for Phnom Penh
- In office 25 November 1998 – 16 November 2017
- Majority: 125,529 (18.9%) (2013)

President of the Executive Committee of the Cambodia National Rescue Party
- In office 9 April 2013 – 16 November 2017
- President: Sam Rainsy; Kem Sokha
- Preceded by: Position established
- Succeeded by: Party dissolved

Chairman of Parliamentary Commission on Interior, National Defense, and Civil Service Administration
- In office 2005–2008
- Prime Minister: Hun Sen

Treasurer of Sam Rainsy Party
- In office June 1995 – 2010
- Prime Minister: Hun Sen
- Leader: Sam Rainsy
- Succeeded by: Ky Wandara

Personal details
- Born: 28 September 1964 (age 62) Phnom Penh, Cambodia
- Party: Cambodia National Rescue Party (2012–17); Sam Rainsy Party(1998–2012)
- Spouse: Ke Sovannaroth
- Education: National University of Management (B.Ec); Saitama University (MPS); Tsinghua University (MA)
- Profession: Politician, businessman

Yim Sovann (Khmer: យឹម សុវណ្ណ; born 28 September 1964) is a Cambodian politician, who was the Spokesperson and President of the Executive Committee of the Cambodia National Rescue Party. He was an elected member of the Cambodian parliament representing Phnom Penh until 2017, when the Cambodia National Rescue Party was dissolved. He is also a successful businessman, and a father of two children. He also served as Deputy Leader of the Opposition.

Yim Sovann was first elected to represent Phnom Penh in the National Assembly of Cambodia in 1998. Age just 34 at the time, he was Cambodia's youngest parliamentarian. He ventured into Cambodian politics as the Secretary to the Minister of Finance in 1993 and later became a founding member of the Khmer Nation Party (later changed its name to Sam Rainsy Party). He was the Treasurer and Spokesperson of the Sam Rainsy Party. When the Cambodian National Rescue Party was formed, he was appointed President of the Executive Committee of the party as well as being the Party's Spokesperson. He was also the Chairman of the Parliamentary Commission on Interior, National Defense, and Civil Service Administration from 2005 to 2008 in the National Assembly of Cambodia. In January 2015, he became Secretary General of the Parliamentary Minority Group. In December 2016 following Sam Rainsy's exile, he became Deputy Leader of the Opposition until the position was abolished by Parliament on 31 January 2017.

Yim Sovann is known for his public speeches, his anti-corruption stances and his stances on human rights in Cambodia. his nomination for the Chairman of the Parliamentary Commission on Investigation and Anti-Corruption, was rejected by the ruling Cambodian People's Party on 27 August 2014. He has been an long time lawmaker having been elected since 1998.

== Early life ==
Born in 1964, Sovann grew up in Phnom Penh and was forced to endure a miserable period like many other Cambodians under the Pol Pot regime.

== Education ==
Yim Sovann graduated with a Bachelor of Economics from the National University of Management, Phnom Penh, Cambodia. In 1993, he was awarded a full-ride scholarship to Japan where he received a Master's degree in Political Science from Saitama University, Japan. He has also received a degree from Tsinghua University, studying English and Japanese.

== Politics ==
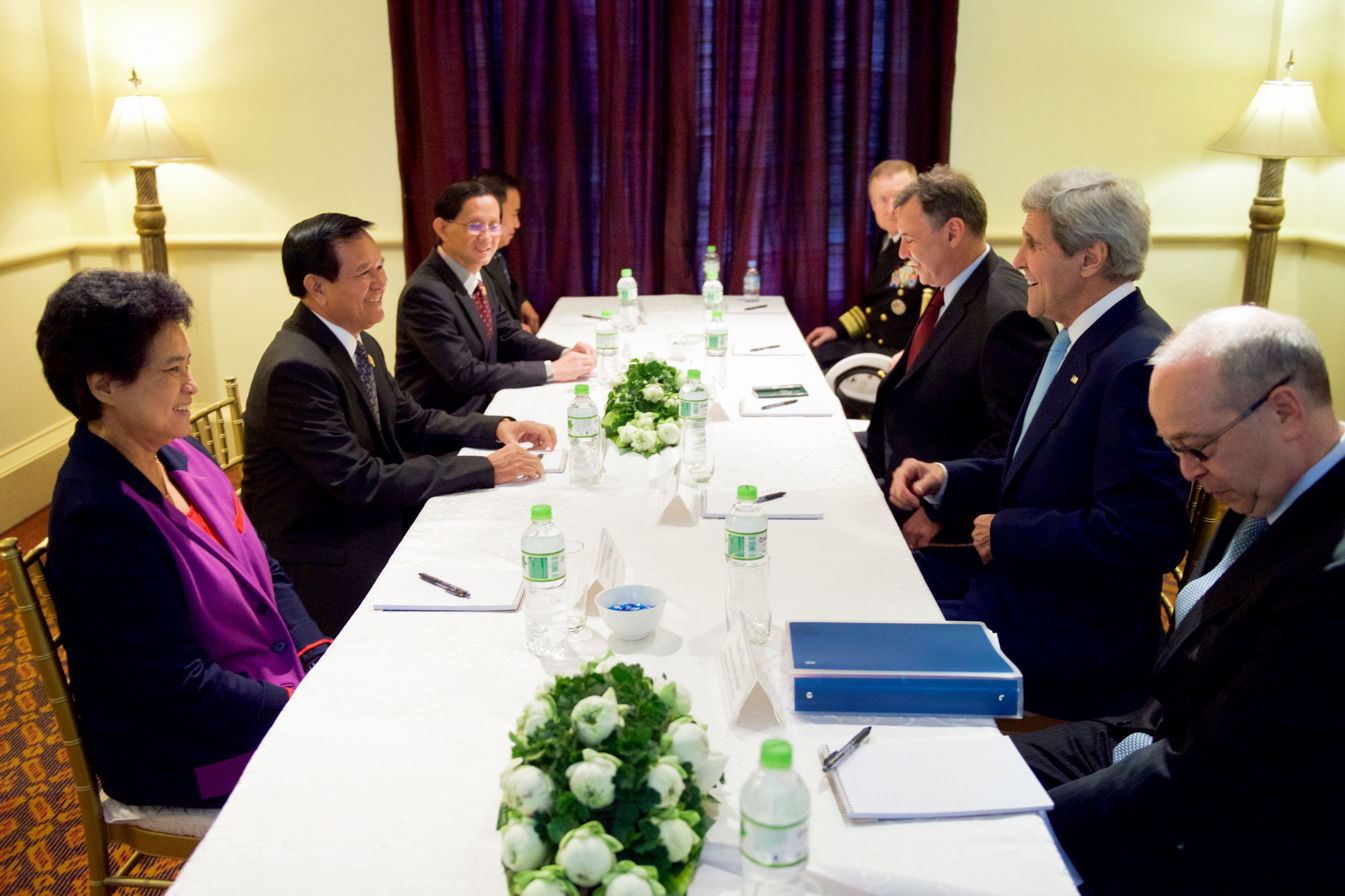
Sovann and his colleagues meet with US Secretary of State John Kerry and Ambassador William A. Heidt in Phnom Penh on 26 January 2016.

Yim Sovann entered politics as the assistant to the minister of finance during 1993–94, while continuing his studies in Japan. He has been a member of parliament (MP) for Phnom Penh since 1998. He was also Chairman of Parliamentary Commission on Interior, National Defense, and Civil Service Administration from 2005 to 2008 in the National Assembly. In January 2015, he became Secretary General of the Parliamentary Minority Group. In January 2015, he became Secretary General of the Parliamentary Minority Group. In December 2016 following Sam Rainsy's exile, he became Deputy Leader of the Opposition until the position was abolished by Parliament on 31 January 2017.
