= Kuoy Bunroeun =

Cambodian politician

Member of Parliament for Kampong Cham Takeo (2003–2013)
- In office 27 July 2003 – 5 August 2014

Personal details
- Born: 12 February 1967 (age 59) Siem Reap, Cambodia
- Party: Cambodian National Rescue Party (2012–17)
- Other political affiliations: Sam Rainsy Party (2003–2012)
- Relations: Eng Chhai Eang (brother-in-law)
- Education: National Institute of Management (B.B.A.)
- Profession: Politician, Accountant

Kuoy Bunroeun (Khmer: គួយ ប៊ុនរឿន, born February 12, 1967) is a Cambodian politician belonging to the Cambodia National Rescue Party representing Kampong Cham Province. He was also a Sam Rainsy Party member representing Takeo Province in the 4th Mandate (2003-2008). He was replaced by Sam Rainsy in 2014 who was barred from running in the election.
