= Cambodia Democratic Movement of National Rescue =

Cambodia Democratic Movement for National Rescue Kanakpak Sangkrous Cheat Kampuchea
- President: Sam Rainsy
- Vice president: Kem Sokha
- Founded: 17 July 2012
- Headquarters: Phnom Penh, Cambodia
- Ideology: Liberalism; Liberal democracy Human Rights; Nationalism
- National Assembly: 29 / 123
- Senate: 11 / 58
- Commune: 40 / 1,633

The Cambodia Democratic Movement for National Rescue (CDMNR) is an electoral alliance between the two main democratic opposition parties in Cambodia, the Sam Rainsy Party and the Human Rights Party founded in mid-2012 to run together in the 2013 Cambodian general election.

Its slogan is "Rescue-Serve-Protect".
