= Ke Sovannaroth =

Cambodian politician

Member of Parliament for Siem Reap
- In office 27 July 2003 – 16 November 2017

Secretary-General of Sam Rainsy Party
- In office 2007–2010

Chairwoman of the Parliamentary Commission on Social and Veterans' Affairs
- In office 27 August 2014 – 16 November 2017
- Leader: Sam Rainsy; Kem Sokha (Acting)
- Preceded by: Ho Non

Personal details
- Born: 12 September 1962 (age 62); Phnom Penh, Cambodia
- Political party: Cambodia National Rescue Party
- Spouse: Yim Sovann

Ke Sovannaroth (Khmer: កែ សុវណ្ណរតន៍, born 1962) is a Cambodian politician. She belongs to the Sam Rainsy Party and was elected to represent Siem Reap Province in the National Assembly of Cambodia in 2003.
