= Mu Sochua =

Cambodian politician

- មូរ សុខហួ
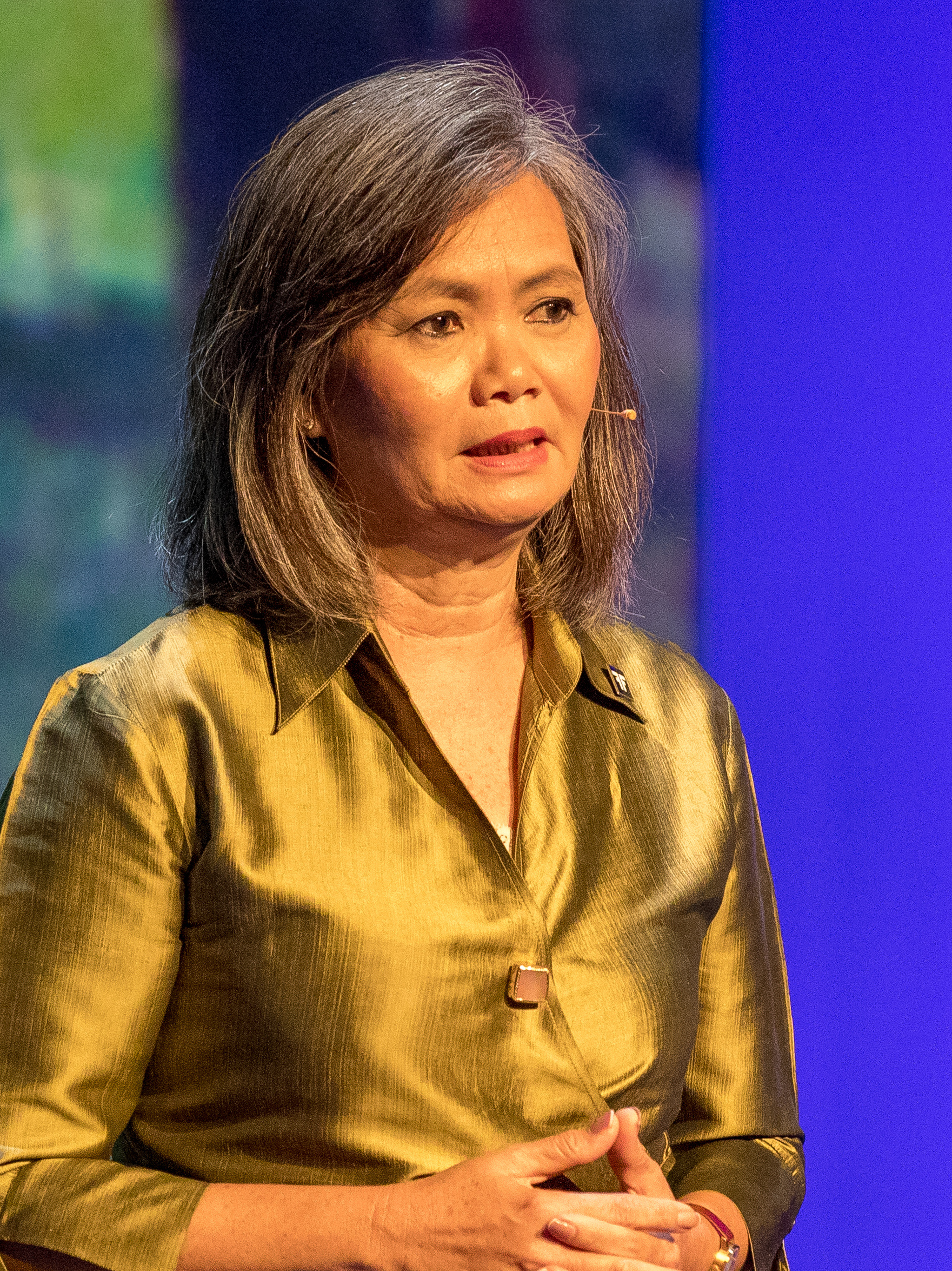
- Sochua in 2018

Vice President of the Cambodia National Rescue Party
- In office 2 March 2017 – 16 November 2017
- President: Kem Sokha
- Preceded by: Kem Sokha
- Succeeded by: Party dissolved

Member of Parliament for Battambang
- In office 5 August 2014 – 16 November 2017
- In office 25 November 1998 – 27 July 2003

Member of Parliament for Kampot
- In office 24 September 2008 – 28 July 2013

Minister of Women's and Veterans' Affairs
- In office 30 November 1998 – 15 July 2004
- Prime Minister: Hun Sen
- Succeeded by: Ing Kuntha Phavi

Personal details
- Born: 15 May 1954 (age 72) Phnom Penh, Cambodia
- Citizenship: Cambodia; United States
- Party: Cambodia National Rescue Party (2012–17); Sam Rainsy Party (2004–12); FUNCINPEC (1989–2004)
- Spouse: Scott Leiper (m. 1984; died 2016)
- Children: 3
- Education: San Francisco State University (BA); University of California, Berkeley (MSW)
- Awards: Eleanor Roosevelt Award for Human Rights
- Website: sochua.wordpress.com

Mu Sochua (Khmer: មូរ សុខហួ; born 15 May 1954) is a Cambodian politician and rights activist. She was a Member of Parliament (MP) for Battambang from 2013 to 2017, a seat which she previously held from 1998 to 2003. She was a member and Vice President of the Cambodia National Rescue Party (CNRP) until its dissolution, and previously a member of the Sam Rainsy Party (SRP) prior to its merger with the Human Rights Party. As a member of FUNCINPEC, she also served as Minister of Women and Veterans' Affairs in Hun Sen's coalition government from 1998 to 2004. She is currently one of 118 senior opposition figures serving a five-year ban from politics following a court ruling on 16 November 2017.

== Early life ==
Sochua was born in Phnom Penh to a Sino-Khmer father (Chinese: 莫子凯; pinyin: Mò Zǐkǎi) and a Sino-Khmer mother (Chinese: 沈珊; pinyin: Shěn Shān) and received her early education at the French lycée. In 1972, Sochua's parents sent her to Paris for further studies. A year later, she relocated to San Francisco to join her brother there. When the Khmer Rouge took control of Cambodia in 1975, her parents vanished. Sochua would remain in exile for the next 18 years. While Sochua was in the US, she earned a Bachelor of Arts in Psychology from the San Francisco State University in 1979, and a Master of Social Work from the University of California, Berkeley in 1981 before returning to Cambodia to help rebuild a society shattered by war. Between 1975 and 1981, she was also the President of the Cambodian community in San Francisco. She joined politics in 1995 as a women's rights activist, citing then U.S. First Lady Hillary Clinton as her inspiration.

== Return from exile ==
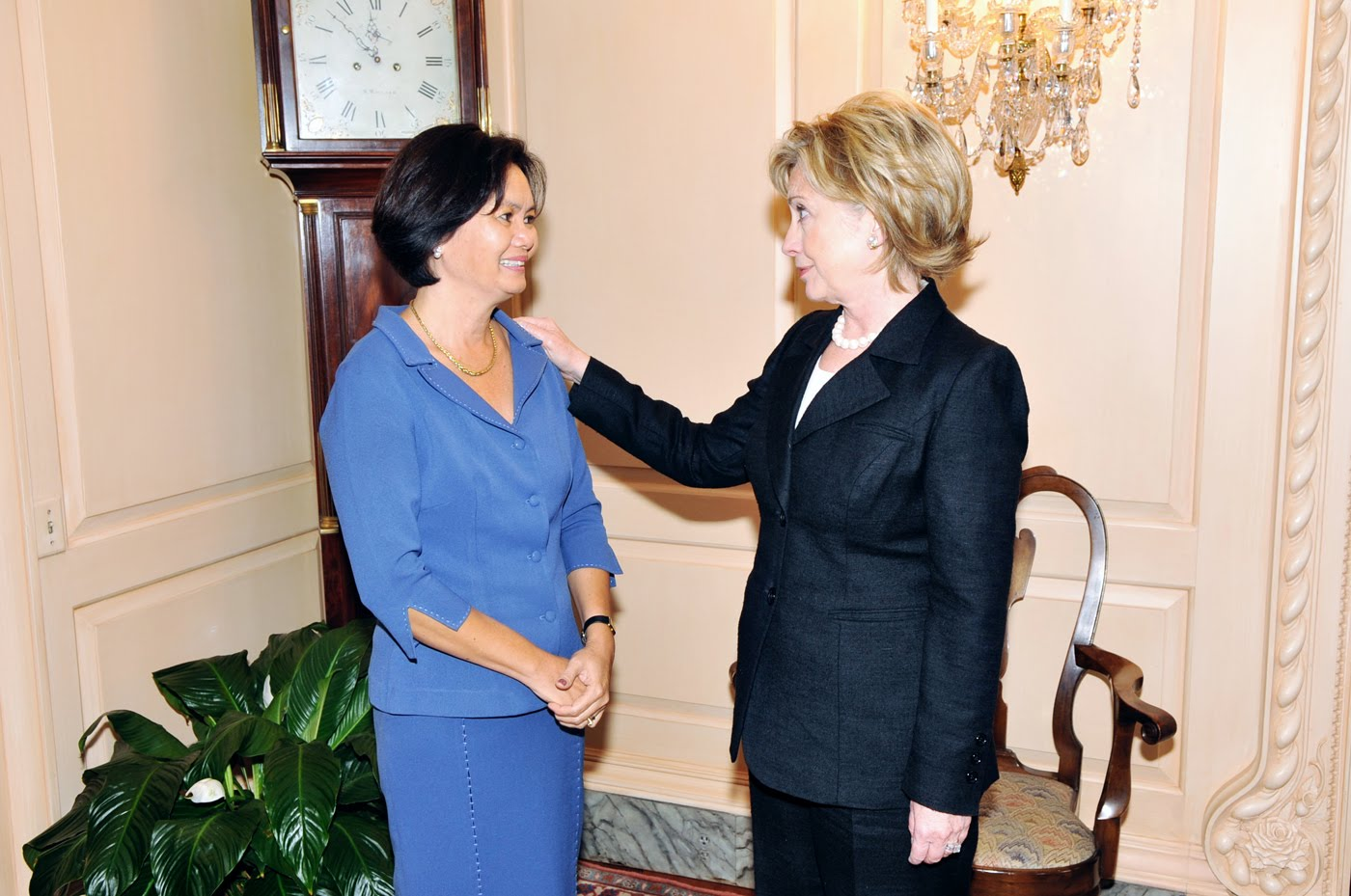
Sochua with US Secretary of State Hillary Clinton in Washington, D.C., 11 September 2009.

Sochua returned to Cambodia in 1989 after 18 years in exile, and has worked as an advocate for human rights, working to stop human trafficking, domestic violence and worker exploitation. Sochua formed the first organization for women, called Khemara (Khmer: ខេមរា). and joined the Funcinpec political party, winning a national assembly seat representing Battambang in 1998. Soon afterwards, she was asked to take over the Ministry of Women's and Veterans' Affairs, one of only two women in the cabinet.

In July 2004 she stepped down from her role as a Minister, citing corruption as a major obstacle to her work. Almost immediately, she transferred her allegiance to the Sam Rainsy party, where she is deputy head of the steering committee.

== April 2009 defamation action ==
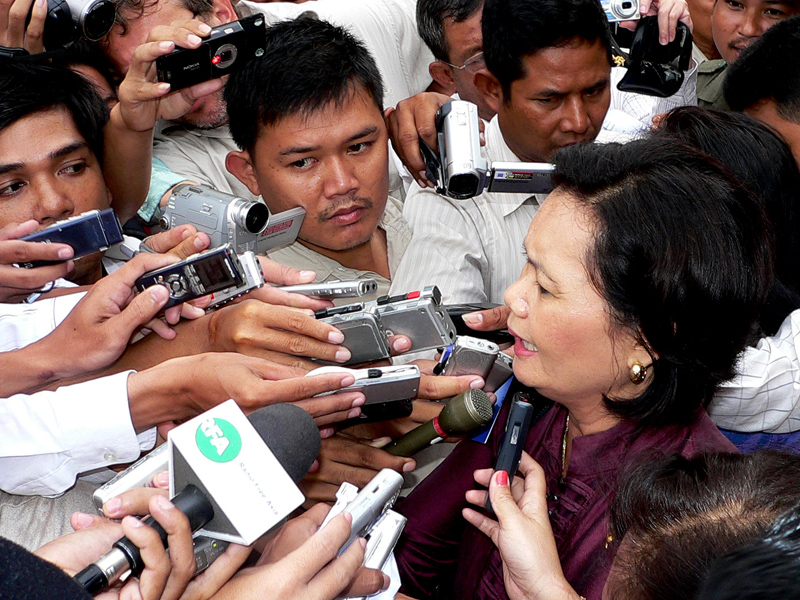
Mu Sochua after her verdict by Court on 4 August 2009.

At a press conference held on 23 April 2009, Mu Sochua announced she would file a defamation complaint against Cambodian prime Minister Hun Sen with the Phnom Penh Municipal Court. "I have nothing against Samdech the Prime Minister. As a Member of Parliament, I respect him. But the words of Samdech the Prime Minister said in public affect my honour and my dignity as a Khmer woman. With this complaint, I only want justice and honour, as a Khmer woman", Sochua said. She added that she only claimed a 500-riel (0.12 dollar) compensation as a token, and a public apology on the part of the head of government.

Following Sochua's announcement, Ky Tech, legal adviser to the government of Cambodia, was expected to file a counter-suit for gravely defaming the PM. The Ministry of Justice was expected to request the President of the parliament to vote to remove Sochua's parliamentary immunity. With only 25 percent of the votes, the SRP would be powerless to prevent further action against her – including imprisonment. Sochua's letter calling for support from the international community – "As I walk to prison" — was circulated around the World Wide Web.

On two previous occasions, when SRP party leader Sam Rainsy's parliamentary immunity was removed, he fled Cambodia under threat of criminal charges and went into exile in France.

== 2017 Threats to end the "rebellion" Mu Sochua flees ==
Since the arrest of Kem Sokha Prime Minister Hun Sen has warned that "It is not done yet" and warns that the "rebellion" crackdown will not stop with Sokha. On the 3 October 2017 Mu Sochua fled the country after a tip off that she will be arrested.

Sochua was detained by Malaysian immigration authorities on 7 November 2019, shortly before a planned return to Cambodia.

== Personal life ==
Sochua was married in 1984 to an American Scott Leiper, and is a mother of three daughters, including women's rights activist, Devi Leiper O'Malley. Scott Leiper died in 2016. Sochua lived in the United States for 18 years and attended university there. She also reportedly lost her ability to speak formal Khmer, having left her home country for almost two decades. She holds American dual citizenship.

== Awards and recognition ==
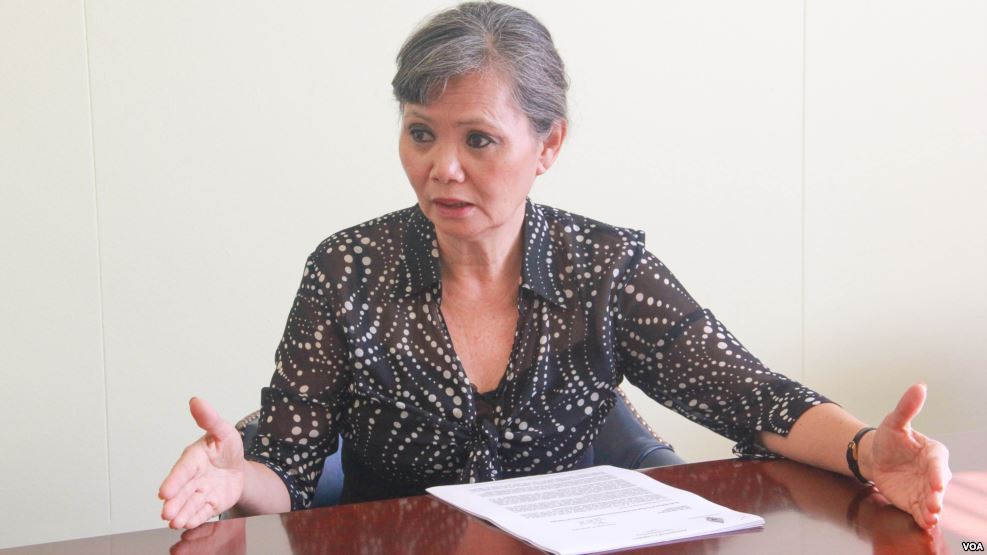
Mu Sochua in June 2016

In 2005, she received the Leadership Award in Washington, DC, from the Vital Voices Foundation, co-founded by Senator Hillary Clinton. In 2002 she mobilized 12,000 women candidates to run for commune elections, with over 900 women winning and still actively promoting the women's agenda at the grass-roots level. In that same year she helped create and pass the Prevention of Domestic Violence Bill, which imposes severe penalties on marital rape and abuse of minors. Her work in Cambodia also includes campaigns with men to end domestic violence and the spread of HIV/AIDS; working for the rights of female entrepreneurs; working for labor laws that provide fair wages and safe working conditions for female workers; and working for the development of communities for squatters with schools, health centers, sanitation, and employment.

In 2005, Sochua was one of 1,000 women nominated for the Nobel Peace Prize for her work against sex trafficking of women in Cambodia and Thailand. Also in 2005, Sochua was honoured with the Vital Voices Human Rights Global Leadership Award for her efforts to stem the tide of human trafficking.

In 2006, Sochua was awarded the Elise and Walter A. Haas International Award from the University of California, Berkeley for distinguished record of service in Cambodia and an Honorary PhD in Law from the University of Guelph, Canada.

In 2009, Sochua was awarded the Eleanor Roosevelt Award from the Eleanor Roosevelt Project at The George Washington University for leadership in human rights.

In 2010, Sochua was named the 2010 People's Choice Honoree by Global Exchange for their Human Rights Heroes Award. The Human Rights Awards Gala brings together activists, supporters, and friends to recognize the efforts of exceptional individuals and organizations from around the country and around the world.

In 2015, Sochua was honored by her alma mater, San Francisco State University, as the Alumna of the Year.
