= Pol Hom =

Cambodian politician (born 1946)

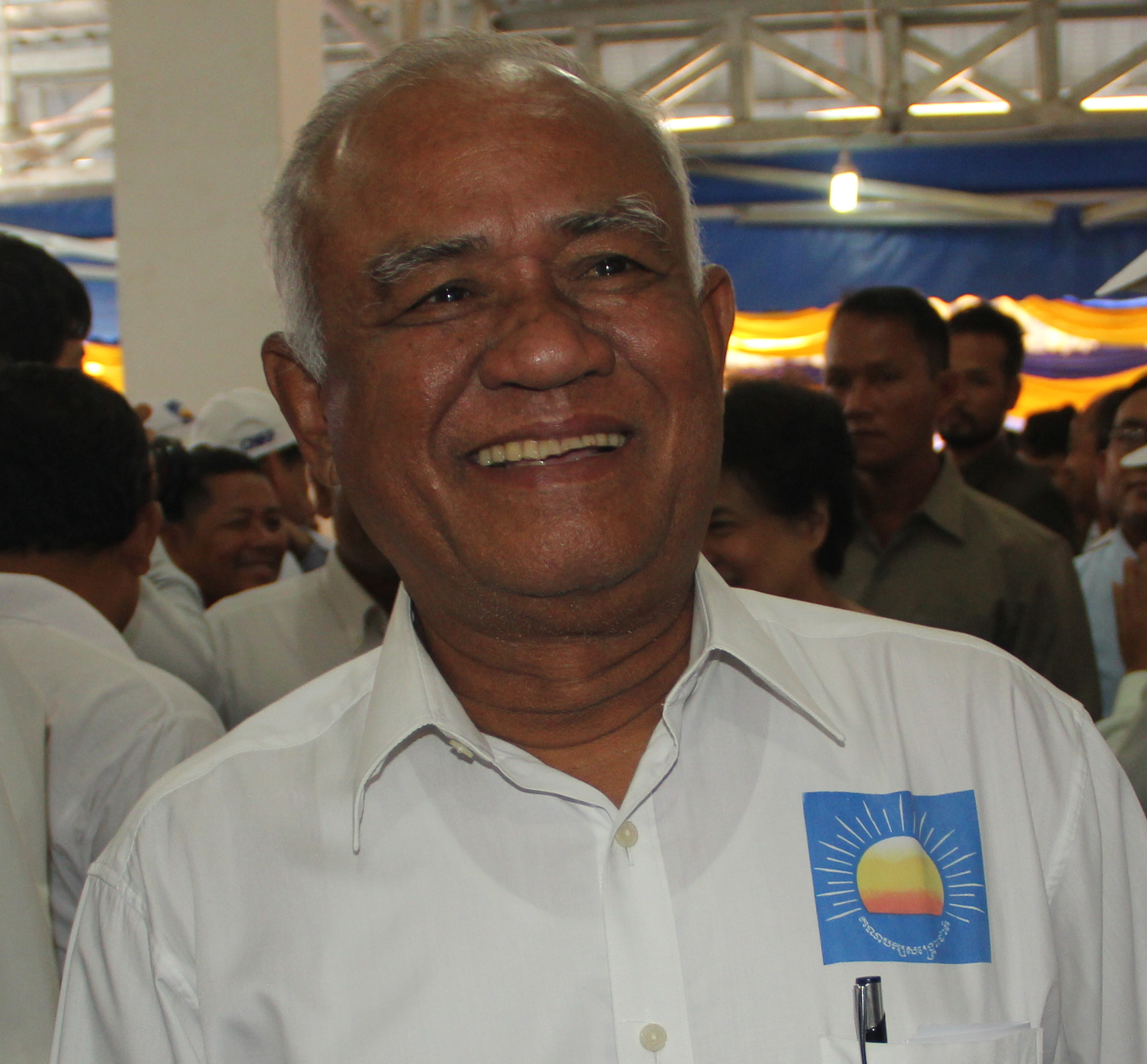
- Hom in 2017

Vice President of the Cambodia National Rescue Party
- In office 2 March 2017 – 16 November 2017
- President: Kem Sokha
- Preceded by: Kem Sokha
- Succeeded by: Party dissolved

Member of Parliament for Takéo
- In office 5 August 2014 – 16 November 2017

Chairman of the Parliamentary Commission on Planning and Investment
- In office 26 August 2014 – 16 November 2017
- Preceded by: Mok Mareth

Member of Parliament for Kampong Thom
- In office 14 June 1993 – 26 July 1998

Personal details
- Born: 3 February 1946 (age 80)
- Party: Cambodia National Rescue Party (2012–17); Human Rights Party (2007–12); Buddhist Liberal Democratic Party (1993–97)

Pol Hom (Khmer: ប៉ុល ហំម; born 3 February 1946) is a Cambodian politician and Member of Parliament for Takéo Province. He is the co-Vice President of the Cambodia National Rescue Party. On 26 August 2014, he was elected chairman of the National Assembly Commission on Planning.
