= Monovithya Kem =

Cambodian politician

Her Excellency Kem Monovithya
- កឹម មនោវិទ្យា

Special Envoy of the Prime Minister of Cambodia
- Incumbent
- Assumed office 17 August 2026
- Prime Minister: Hun Manet
- Preceded by: Position established

Personal details
- Born: 2 October 1981 (age 44) Phnom Penh, Cambodia
- Party: Independent (since 2017); Cambodia National Rescue Party (2012–2017); Human Rights Party (2007–2012)
- Parent(s): Kem Sokha; Te Chanmono
- Education: San Jose State University (BS); University of Amsterdam (MS)

Monovithya Kem (born 2 October 1981) is a Cambodian politician and the eldest daughter of Cambodian opposition leader Kem Sokha. She is a member of the Permanent Committee of the Cambodia National Rescue Party and its Deputy Director-General of Public Affairs since 2013. In 2026, she was appointed as Special Envoy to the Prime Minister of Cambodia by Hun Manet, equivalent to the rank of minister.

She was in exile following the country’s political crisis in 2017, when her father was imprisoned and the Cambodia National Rescue Party was dissolved. She has since been leading the advocacy efforts abroad to restore Cambodia’s democracy. Her advocacy has drawn threats from the ruling regime including that from the Deputy Prime Minister threatening to amend the Constitution to ban her from the country.

She has been reported to be a target of alleged ongoing espionage from China. The Facebook Files received by the United States Congress in 2021 also found suspected ties to Chinese intelligence engaging in consistent and long term targeting of officials from the Cambodia National Rescue Party.

Kem first came to public attention when she successfully campaigned for her father's release from Cambodia's prison in 2006. She was an organizer and speaker for the 2006 campaign to free her father and four other Cambodian human rights activists.

In 2014, Kem was considered to serve on the National Election Committee (Cambodia), but eventually she withdrew her candidacy.

Kem was born and raised in Cambodia. She holds a bachelor of science in business administration from San Jose State University and a masters of science in business economics from the University of Amsterdam.
