= Tioulong Saumura =

Cambodian politician and financial analyst

- ជូឡុង សូមូរ៉ា
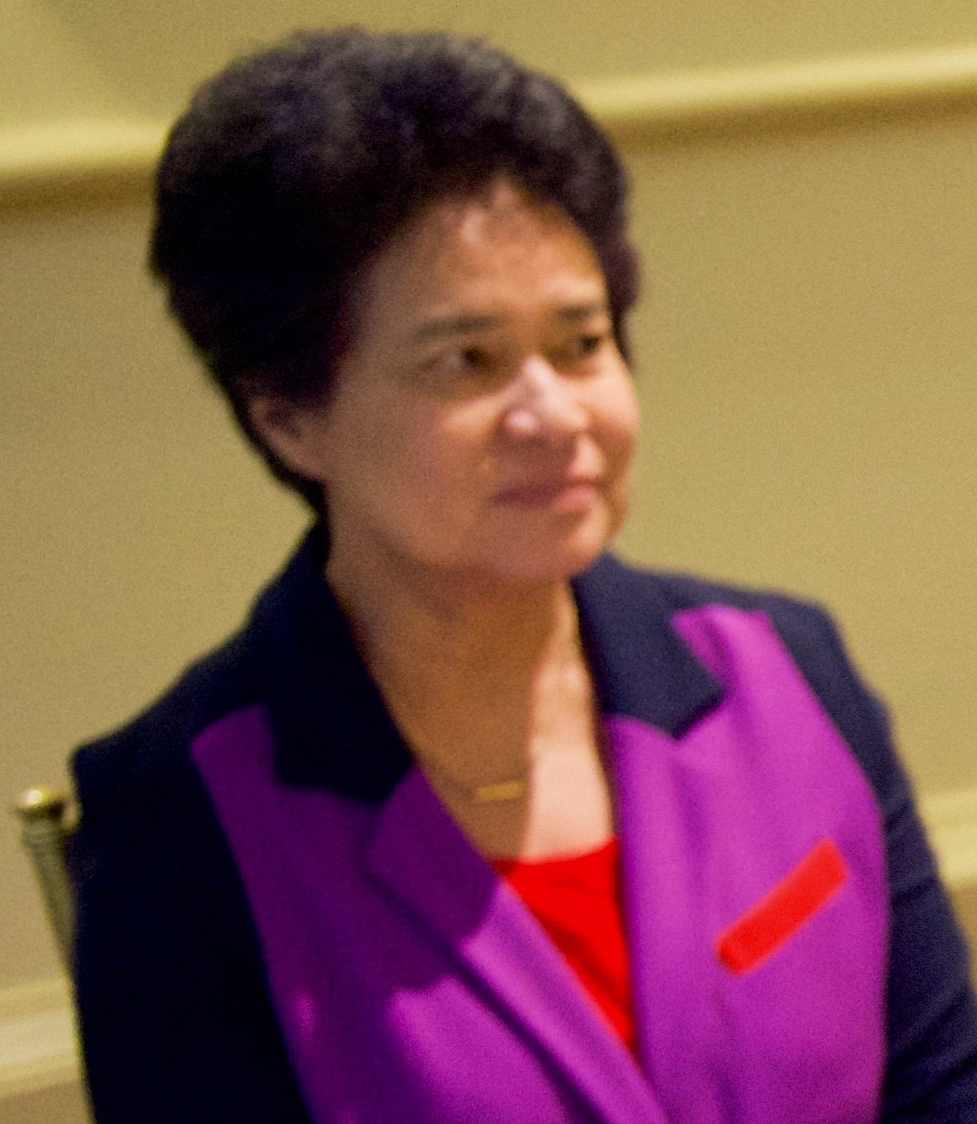
- Saumura in 2016

Member of Parliament for Phnom Penh
- In office 25 November 1998 – 16 November 2017

Personal details
- Born: 9 July 1950 (age 76) Phnom Penh, Cambodia
- Citizenship: Cambodia; France
- Party: Cambodia National Rescue Party (2012–17); Sam Rainsy Party (1995–2012); FUNCINPEC (1989–95)
- Spouse: Sam Rainsy (m. 1971)
- Relations: Sam Sary (father-in-law)
- Children: 3
- Parent: Nhiek Tioulong (father)
- Education: Sciences Po (BPS); INSEAD (MBA)
- Profession: Politician; Financial analyst

Tioulong Saumura (Khmer: ជូឡុង សូមូរ៉ា; born 9 July 1950, Khmer pronunciation: [cuːloŋ soːmuːraː]) is a Cambodian politician and financial analyst. She was a member of the Cambodia National Rescue Party and was elected to represent Phnom Penh in the National Assembly of Cambodia in 2003. She was also the Deputy Governor of Cambodia's Central Bank from 1993 to 1995.

Saumura was born in 1950 as one of the seven daughters of former prime minister Nhiek Tioulong and Lok Chumteav Measketh Samphotre. She and her six sisters passed much of their childhood outside of Cambodia, primarily in France, but also in Moscow, and Tokyo. While in France, she received a postgraduate degree in economics from the University of Paris in 1974. She subsequently attended the European Institute of Administration and earned a further degree in financial analysis. Like her husband, she holds French dual citizenship.

After the Cambodian Civil War, as the Vietnamese withdrew from Cambodia and the United Nations Transitional Authority in Cambodia began implementing the UN Settlement Plan, Saumura and her husband, opposition leader Sam Rainsy returned to Cambodia in 1992.

Her mother, Measketh Samphotre, died on 24 November 2016 at the age of 96.

On 16 November 2017, she was one of 118 senior CNRP party members banned from politics for five years.
