= Eng Chhai Eang =

Cambodian politician (born 1965)

- អេង ឆៃអ៊ាង
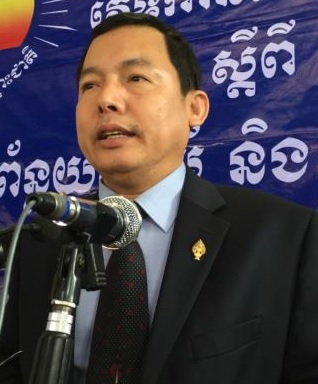
- Chhai Eang in 2016

Vice President of the Cambodia National Rescue Party
- In office 2 March 2017 – 16 November 2017
- President: Kem Sokha
- Preceded by: Kem Sokha
- Succeeded by: Party dissolved

Member of Parliament for Kandal
- In office 5 August 2014 – 16 November 2017

Member of Parliament for Battambang
- In office 4 October 2003 – 10 May 2011

Member of the Senate
- In office 24 March 2012 – 9 April 2013

Personal details
- Born: 10 November 1965 (age 60) Kampong Thom, Cambodia
- Citizenship: Cambodian
- Party: Cambodia National Rescue Movement (2018–present); Cambodia National Rescue Party (2013–17); Sam Rainsy Party (1998–2013); Funcinpec Party (1992–95)
- Spouse: Ly Sokunthea
- Education: University of Health Sciences (MD)

Eng Chhai Eang (Khmer: អេង ឆៃអ៊ាង born November 10, 1965) is a Cambodian politician. He served as a vice president of the Cambodia National Rescue Party, the major opposition party, until its court-ordered dissolution in 2017. He was a member of the Parliament of Cambodia and served as the Secretary General of the Sam Rainsy Party from 1999 to 2005 and again from 2007 to 2009. He also served as the Special Secretary to Sam Rainsy, the Minister of Economic and Finance, from 1993 to 1994.

In addition to his political positions, Chhai Eang is also the founder of the newspaper Khmer Youth Voice and a member of the Youth Movement of FUNCINPEC. He is a graduate of the University of Health Sciences.

== Early life and education ==
Eng Chhai Eang was born on 10 November 1965 in Kampong Chen Village, Kampong Chen Commune, Stoung District, Cambodia, to parents Eng Kheang and York Meas. In 1990, Chhai Eang married Ly Sokunthea; they had four children, two sons and two daughters.

Chhai Eang started the primary school in Stoung District in Kampong Chen Village, Kampong Thom City. Then he went to high school in Soutr Nikom District in Siem Reap province. Eng Chhai Eang was an outstanding student, was honored and was the top number one in the National Mathematics competition in 1987. He graduated from University of Health Sciences in 1993. He received a Diploma of Medical Doctor, the combined faculty of Medicine, Pharmacy and Dentistry.

== Political career ==
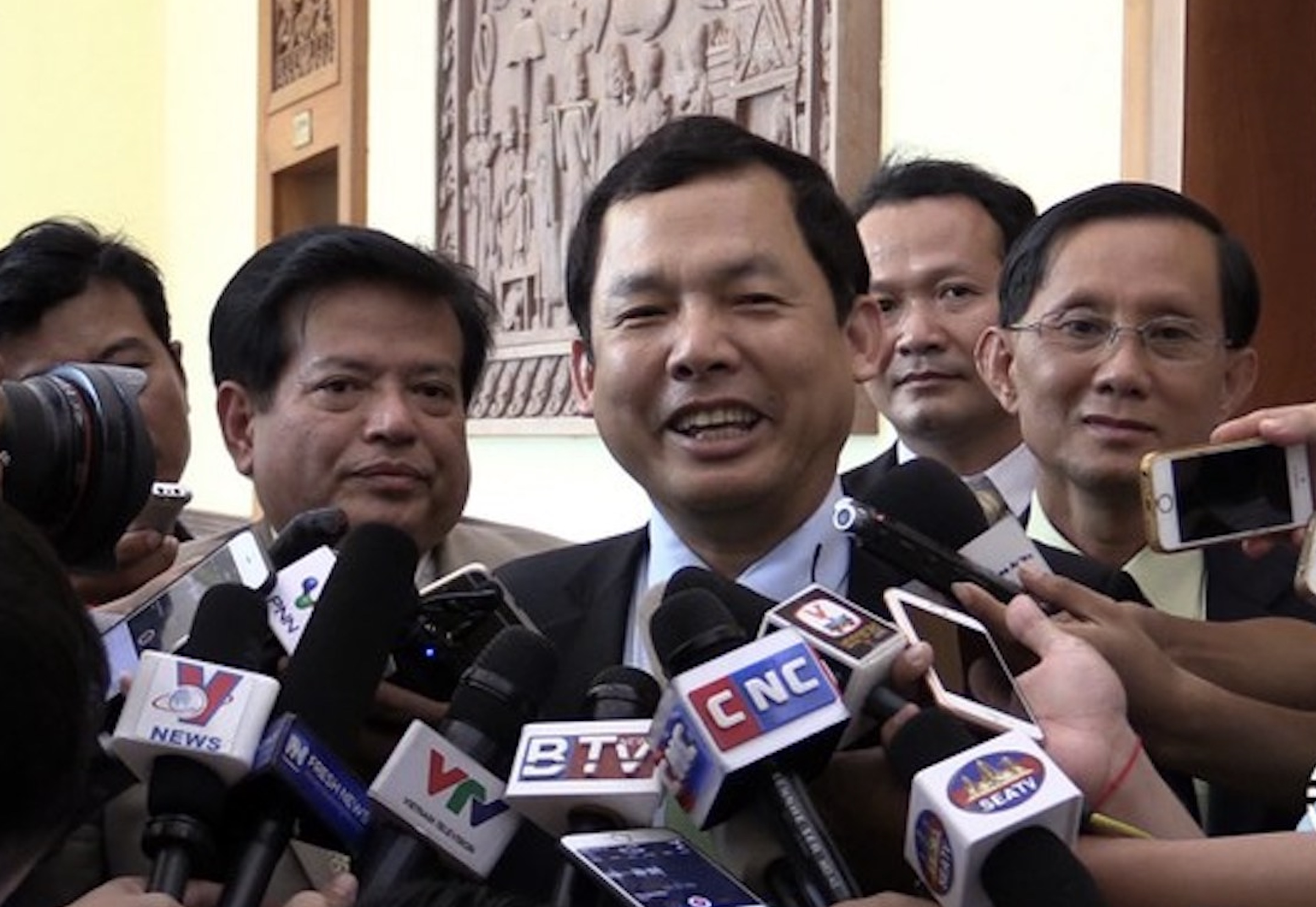
CNRP Lawmaker Eng Chhai Eang speaks to reporters after a meeting at the Ministry of Interior in Phnom Penh, March 29, 2017.

Chhai Eang started his political journey in December 1992 when he joined the Youth Movement of FUNCINPEC and went on to found the local newspaper Khmer Youth Voice (សម្លេងយុវជនខ្មែរ) in 1993. This newspaper was established to support the policies of FUNCINPEC.

From July 1993 to October 1994, Chhai Eang served as a secretary to Sam Rainsy, while also serving as a founder and advisor to the Khmer Youth Voice newspaper from April 1994 to December 1996. He became a founder and member of the Steering Committee of the Khmer Nation Party in November 1995, which was later renamed the Sam Rainsy Party. From August 1999 to December 2005, and then again from September 2007 to January 2009, he held the position of Secretary General of the Sam Rainsy Party.

In the 2003 Cambodian general election for the 3rd mandate, Chhai Eang was elected as a member of Parliament for Battambang province, and was re-elected in the 2008 Cambodian general election for the 4th mandate. He was elected as a member of the Senate for the region of Kandal province in the 2012 Senator election.

From April 2013 to March 2017, Chhai Eang served as the Vice Chair of the Steering Committee of the Cambodia National Rescue Party (CNRP). In the 2013 Cambodian general election for the fifth mandate, he was elected as a member of Parliament for Kandal province. In September 2014, Chhai Eang was elected as the Chairperson of the First Commission on Human Rights, Complaints, and Investigations of the National Assembly.

In March 2017, Chhai Eang was named a vice president of the CNRP.

Following the dissolution of the CNRP in November 2017, Chhai Eang was banned from politics, and left Cambodia. In November 2019, the government revoked his Cambodian passport as well as those of eleven other former high-ranking CNRP cadres.
