= Nhiek Tioulong =

Cambodian politician

General Samdech Chakrey Konhchara Thipadei Nhiek Tioulong
- ញឹក ជូឡុង
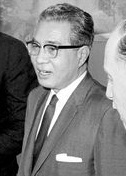
- Tioulong in 1961

Prime Minister of Cambodia
- Acting
- In office 13 February 1962 – 6 August 1962
- Monarch: Sisowath Kossamak
- President: Norodom Sihanouk
- Preceded by: Norodom Sihanouk
- Succeeded by: Chau Sen Cocsal

Minister of Finance
- In office 17 October 1945 – 14 December 1946
- Prime Minister: Sisowath Monireth
- Preceded by: Penn Nouth
- Succeeded by: Son Sann

Minister of Foreign Affairs
- In office 28 January 1961 – 13 February 1962
- Prime Minister: Penn Nouth; Norodom Sihanouk
- Preceded by: Tep Phan
- Succeeded by: Norodom Kantol

President of FUNCINPEC
- In office 1989–1992
- Preceded by: Norodom Sihanouk
- Succeeded by: Norodom Ranariddh

Minister of National Education
- In office 14 August 1945 – 16 October 1945
- Prime Minister: Son Ngoc Thanh
- Preceded by: Meas Nal
- Succeeded by: Sisowath Monipong

Personal details
- Born: 23 August 1908 Phnom Penh, Cambodia, French Indochina
- Died: 9 June 1996 (aged 87) British Hong Kong
- Party: FUNCINPEC (1981–1996); Sangkum (1955–1970); Khmer Renovation (1947–1955)
- Spouse: Measketh Samphotre
- Relations: Sam Rainsy (son-in-law)
- Children: 7, including Tioulong Saumura

Military service
- Allegiance: Cambodia
- Branch/service: Royal Cambodian Army
- Years of service: 1949–1996
- Rank: General

Nhiek Tioulong (Note: Khmer: ញឹក ជូឡុង, Nhoĕk Chulŏng; Khmer pronunciation: [ɲɨk cuː.loŋ]), (23 August 1908 – 9 June 1996), was a Cambodian army officer, politician, and actor who served as Acting Prime Minister of Cambodia from 13 February 1962 to 6 August 1962. He was a prominent politician during the tenure of Prince Norodom Sihanouk. He also served as Minister for Foreign Affairs in the 1960s and repeatedly as governor of provinces in Cambodia. In 1969 he received the honorary title Samdech Chakrey Konhchara Thipadei (Khmer: សម្ដេចចក្រីកុញ្ចរាធិបតី) by Prince Norodom Sihanouk.

Tioulong fathered seven daughters, one of whom was future lawmaker Tioulong Saumura, who would go on to marry prominent opposition leader Sam Rainsy.

== Early life ==
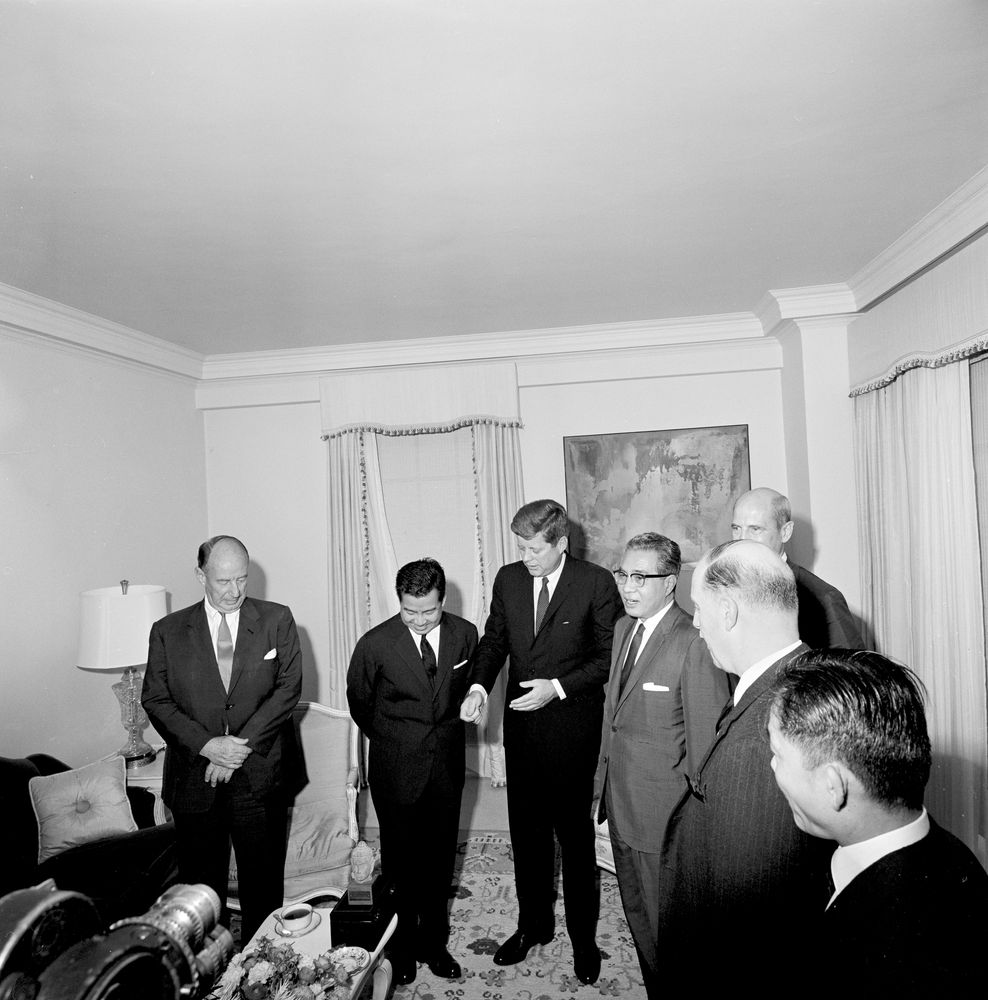
Nhiek Tioulong (fourth from left) as Cambodia's foreign minister during a trip to New York City with prince Sihanouk and US president John F. Kennedy.

Early Nhiek Tioulong was born in 1908 in Phnom Penh, in a family of mandarins with Chinese ancestry near the palace. After primary education in Lycee Sisowath in Phnom Penh, he attended, and graduated from, the prestigious high school Chasseloup Laubat in Saigon.

== Political career ==
He returned to Cambodia in 1932 and served as governor of Pursat in 1937 and from 1939 to 1944 as governor of Kampong Cham. On March 9, 1945, he was appointed governor of Phnom Penh.

Under the Sisowath Monireth administration, he served as Minister of Finance from 17 October 1945 to 14 December 1946. He also served as Minister of Education during the Son Ngoc Thanh administration. In April 1948, he became the Cambodian government delegate from the French High Commissioner in Indochina and in August of the same year, representative of Cambodia to the High Council of the French Union in Paris. In September, he is part of the French delegation to the UN, as an advisor. On 22 November 1949 he was appointed colonel of the Khmer Royal Army and Chief of Staff. In May 1950, he was appointed as a governor again, of Battambang Province. In 1951, he returned to his position as Minister of Finance.

At the end of December 1953, after Cambodia gained independence, he was appointed the new governor of Phnom Penh and took part in negotiations with the French on the latest skills transfer between the colonial administration and the Cambodian government. On 7 April 1954, he became the Minister of Foreign Affairs. He became the first General of the Royal Cambodian Army. In 1955, he began his career as ambassador, to Japan, Poland, and later Czechoslovakia.

In 1966, he starred in the lead role of Sihanouk's first feature-length film Apsara.

In 1969, he retired to France and remained in the shadows until the mid 1980s when he became vice-president of the National United Front for an Independent, Peaceful and Cooperative Cambodia neutral (FUNCINPEC). This party was created by Norodom Sihanouk to fight the new regime established in Phnom Penh by Vietnamese troops. He led the Funcinpec from 1989 to 1992.

Tioulong died in a Hong Kong hospital on June 9, 1996, aged 87.

== Notes ==
Political offices
Preceded by Norodom Sihanouk	Prime Minister of Cambodia; Acting; 1962	Succeeded by Chau Sen Cocsal Chhum
