= Minority leader =

Legislative political position

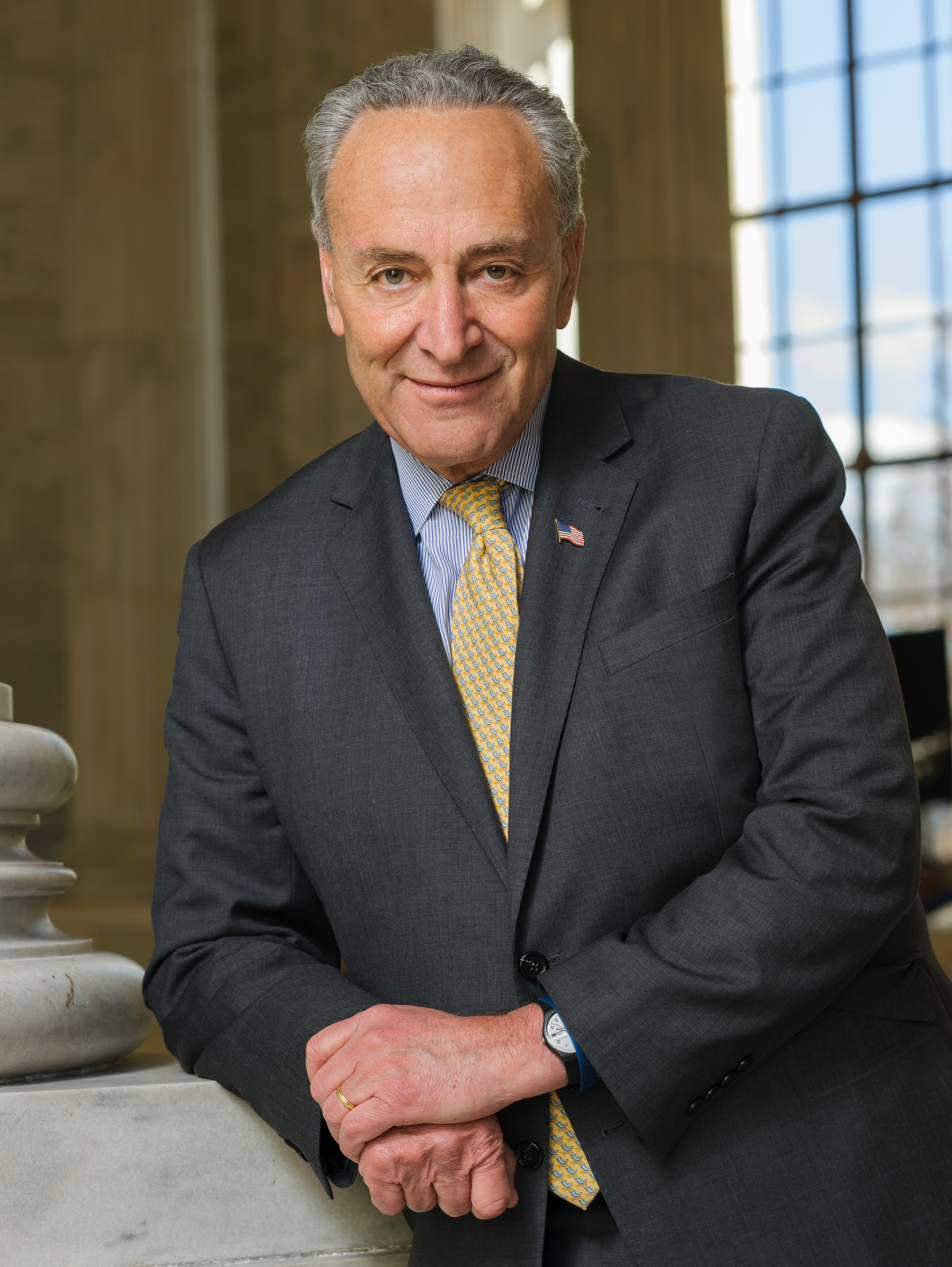
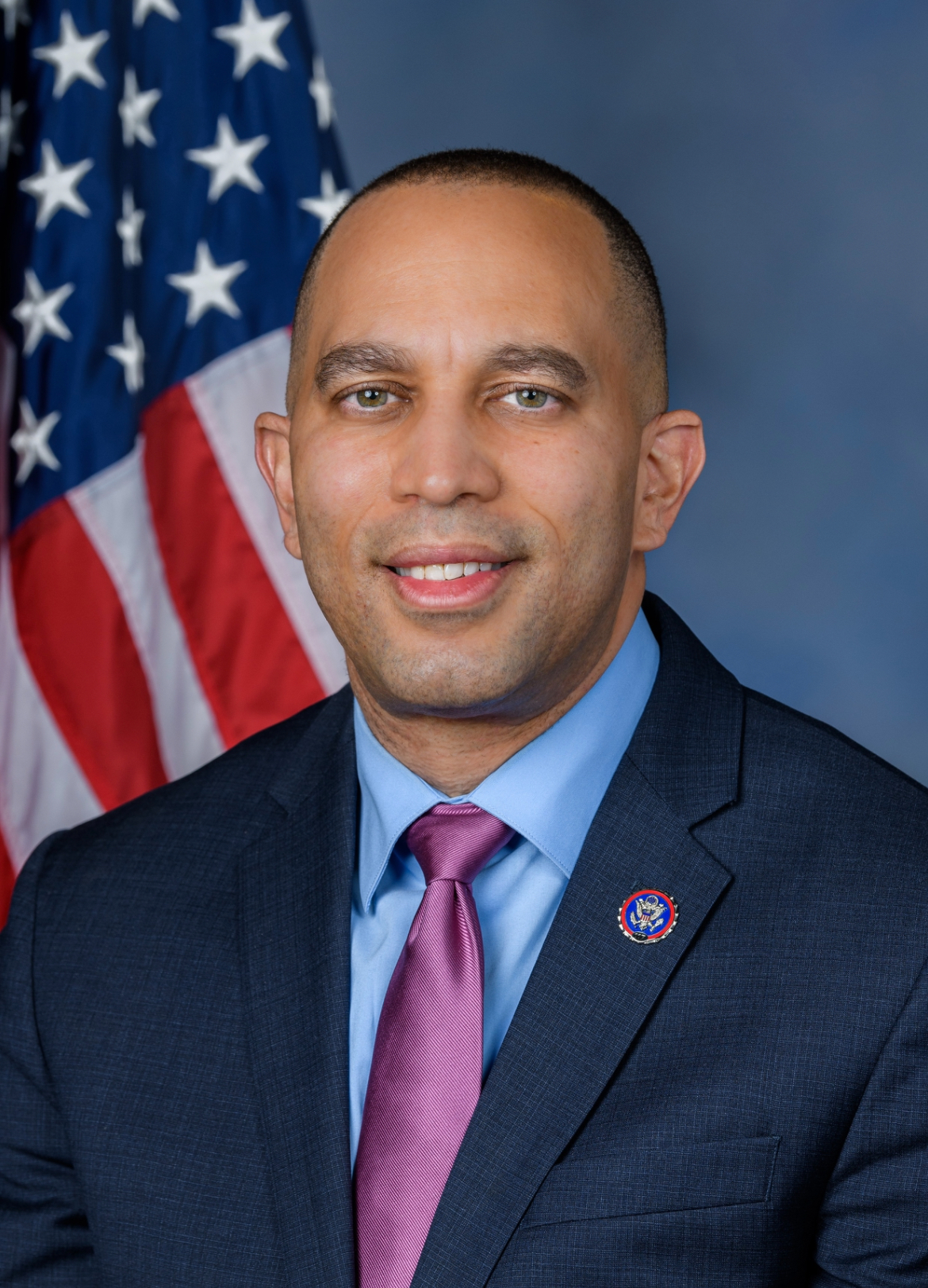
From left to right:
- Senator Chuck Schumer of New York, a Democrat and current Senate minority leader
- Representative Hakeem Jeffries of New York, a Democrat and current House minority leader

The minority leader in U.S. politics (as well as in some other countries utilizing the presidential system) is the floor leader of the second-largest caucus in a legislative body. Given the two-party nature of the U.S. system, the minority leader is almost inevitably either a Republican or a Democrat. The position could be considered similar to that of the leader of the opposition in parliamentary systems. In bicameral legislatures, the counterpart to the minority leader in the lower house is the speaker, and the majority leader is hence only the second-most senior member of the majority caucus. Contrastingly, in upper houses, the titular speaker is frequently a separately elected officer such as a lieutenant governor or vice president.

The minority leader is often assisted in their role by one or more whips, whose job is to enforce party discipline on votes deemed to be crucial by the party leadership and to ensure that members do not vote against the position of the party leaders. Some votes are deemed to be so crucial as to lead to punitive measures (such as demotion from choice committee assignments) for members who violate the party line; decisions such as these are often made by the minority leader in conjunction with other senior party leaders.

In a state where the executive branch and both houses of the state legislature are controlled by the other party, the minority leader of one of the houses (most often the upper one) may be seen as the most senior member of the party in that state with regard to state government (although inferior in rank to a United States senator or United States representative, if there be such in that party from that state).

At times, particularly during crucial legislation, the minority leader may be consulted by the opposite leader in order to more easily get things passed and ensure that provisions important to the interests the minority party be included. The level of partisanship in state legislative bodies varies greatly from one state to another.

== Current minority leaders ==
=== National level minority leaders ===
| State | Lower House | Upper House |
|---|---|---|
| Philippines | House Minority Leader — Marcelino Libanan | Senate Minority Leader — Tito Sotto |
| United States | Senate Minority Leader — Chuck Schumer | House Minority Leader — Hakeem Jeffries |

== Former minority leaders ==
=== National level former minority leaders ===
| State | Lower House | Upper House |
|---|---|---|
| Cambodia | Minority Leader (2015–2017) | — |

== See also ==
- Floor leader
- Leader of the Opposition
- Majority leader
