= Cambodia National Rescue Movement =

Cambodia National Rescue Movement ចលនាសង្គ្រោះជាតិ
- Abbreviation: CNRM
- Leader: Sam Rainsy
- Founder: Sam Rainsy
- Founded: 13 January 2018
- Preceded by: Cambodia National Rescue Party
- Succeeded by: Candlelight Party
- Ideology: Liberalism; Liberal democracy Populism; Anti-authoritarianism
- Political position: Centre
- Regional affiliation: Council of Asian Liberals and Democrats
- International affiliation: Liberal International
- Colours: Blue

The Cambodia National Rescue Movement (CNRM; Khmer: ចលនាសង្គ្រោះជាតិ) is a Cambodian political movement founded in 2018, by exiled former opposition leader Sam Rainsy, following the dissolution of the Cambodia National Rescue Party in November 2017. The movement has no legal status in Cambodia and has been branded as a "terrorist group" by the authoritarian government of Hun Sen.
