= Truong Cang =

Cambodian politician, diplomat (1913–1984)

Oknha Truong Cang
- ទ្រឿង កាង

Foreign Minister of Cambodia
- In office 1958–1958
- Preceded by: Penn Nouth
- Succeeded by: Son Sann

Finance minister of Cambodia
- In office 1957–1958
- In office 1959–1959

Cambodian Ambassador to China
- In office 14 May 1964 – 4 January 1969
- Preceded by: Sisowath Sirik Matak
- Succeeded by: Samreth Soth

Cambodian permanent representative to the United Nations
- In office 1972–1973

Personal details
- Born: 1913 French Cochinchina
- Died: 1984 (aged 70–71) Paris

Oknha Truong Cang (Khmer: ទ្រឿង កាង, also spelled Troueung Kang; 1913–1984) was a Cambodian politician and diplomat.

Truong Cang was a Khmer Krom. He served as Minister of Finance (1957-1958 and 1959) and foreign minister (1958) of Cambodia. He was also a member of the High Council of the Throne.

With his efforts, International Court of Justice (ICJ) awarded ownership of Preah Vihear to Cambodia in 1962.

From 1964 to 1969 he was the ambassador to China. In 1967, the Chinese embassy in Cambodia published and distributed Communist propaganda to the Cambodian populace praising the Cultural Revolution, which irritated Norodom Sihanouk. Sihanouk threatened to break off diplomatic relations with China. Truong Cang was about to leave Beijing, but finally was persuaded to stay in China by Chinese premier Zhou Enlai.

From 1972 to 1973 he was the permanent representative to the United Nations.

Truong Cang was regarded as a national hero by Khmer nationalists. In Phnom Penh, Oknya Truong Cang Road was named after him.
