= Minority Leader (Cambodia) =

Minority Leader of the National Assembly of Cambodia
- ប្រធានក្រុមភាគតិចនៃរដ្ឋសភា
- Parliament of Cambodia; National Assembly of Cambodia
- Style: His Excellency
- Status: Leader of the Opposition
- Seat: Phnom Penh
- Term length: While leader of the largest political party not in government
- Formation: 22 January 2015; 11 years ago
- First holder: Sam Rainsy
- Final holder: Kem Sokha
- Abolished: 31 January 2017; 9 years ago
- Salary: KHR 11,536,000 (MP's salary)

The Minority Leader (Khmer: ប្រធានក្រុមភាគតិច), or the Leader of the Opposition, leads the largest political party not in government in the National Assembly of Cambodia. The Minority Leader acts as a dialogue partner of the Prime Minister, and the Majority Leader. The official minority party must secure at least 25% of the total seats in Parliament.

The role was officially recognized by Parliament in November 2014, making Sam Rainsy the first official Minority Leader. However, prior to this, Rainsy had often been viewed as the de facto Leader of the Opposition.

As in nearly every parliamentary democracy around the world, the Minority Leader comes from the political party with the largest number of seats in the Parliament yet is not in government. The Minority Leader is often seen as a Prime Minister-in-waiting.

The position was abolished by Parliament on 31 January 2017.

== List of opposition leaders ==
No	Name	Portrait	Term of office		Political party
No	Name	Portrait	Took office	Left office	Political party
1	Sam Rainsy		22 January 2015	16 November 2015	Cambodia National Rescue Party
2	Kem Sokha		16 November 2015	31 January 2017	Cambodia National Rescue Party

== See also ==
- List of prime ministers of Cambodia
- List of political parties in Cambodia
- Parliament of Cambodia
