= Wat Svay Pope =

Buddhist monastery in Cambodia

Coordinates: 11.55014°N 104.9309°E

- វត្តស្វាយពពែ
- Location within Cambodia

Religion
- Affiliation: Theravada Buddhism

Location
- Location: Phnom Penh
- Country: Cambodia
- Interactive map of Wat Svay Pope

Architecture
- Completed: 1929

Wat Svay Pope (Khmer: វត្តស្វាយពពែ) is a Theravada Buddhist temple located in Phnom Penh, Cambodia, and built in 1929.

== History ==
Wat Svay Pope was built in 1929.

In June 2002, 100 poor people from Kampong Speu province who had found refuge in the pagoda were chased away and found refuge in the nearby headquarters of political opponent Sam Rainsy, in a political stunt.

On November 28, 2016, the same political opponent Sam Rainsy did not return to Cambodia from exile to attend the cremation of his mother-in-law at Wat Svay Pope after his letter asking Prime Minister Hun Sen for permission to return went unanswered.

In 2021, the Cambodian Ministry of Culture and Fine Arts said it approved the demolition of the 92-year-old temple located at Svay Pope pagoda in Phnom Penh at the request of the pagoda's chief monk after inspections revealed that it was heavily damaged and structurally unsound. The demolition went through despite concerns of some architects who said the “rare Buddhist structure” should have been preserved. Immediately after the outburst of criticism on March 7, the Ministry of Culture and Fine Arts issued a statement.

== Architecture ==
The architecture of Wat Svay Pope is rare in terms of post-Angkorian Buddhist structures.

Inside the compound, there is a row of golden bell-shaped stupas in front of the pagoda.

To the north, next to the pagoda, there is a modern dark red four-story building.

There are some other old buildings such as the library and the monks' dormitory.

== Preah Sihamoni Raja Buddhist College ==
In 2005, Preah Sihamoni Raja Buddhist College was founded by Samedech Bour Kry, the Supreme Patriarch of Thommayut Buddhist Order, to provide higher Buddhist studies to the monks. This Buddhist College consists of two departments: the Department of Buddhism and the Department of Administration. It admits 100 monk students.

== Location ==
Wat Svay Pope is located along Sothearos Street in front of the Embassy of the Russian Federation in Phnom Penh. It is about 100 m from the Aeon Mall of Phnom Penh.
