= Chhay Than =

Cambodian politician

Minister of Finance of Kampuchea
- In office 1986–1993
- Preceded by: Chan Phin
- Succeeded by: Sam Rainsy

Personal details
- Born: 1947 (age 78–79)
- Party: Cambodian People's Party

Chhay Than is a Cambodian politician. He belongs to the Cambodian People's Party.

Than was born in 1947. He became the head of the taxation department at the Ministry of Finance of Kampuchea in 1981. He was Deputy Minister of Finance from 1984 to 1986 and then Minister of Finance from 1986 to 1993. He became a full member of the central committee of People's Revolutionary Party of Kampuchea in 1989. Later he became secretary of state, and then Minister of Planning in 1998.

Than was elected to represent Kandal Province in the National Assembly of Cambodia in 2003.
