= Touch Kim =

Cambodian politician

Minister of Finance
- In office 1958; 1967–1968

Governor of the National Bank of Cambodia
- In office 1970–1972
- Preceded by: Son Sann
- Succeeded by: Hing Kunthel

Personal details
- Born: 5 January 1921 (age 105) Kampot

Touch Kim is a former politician from Cambodia.

He was born on 5 January 1921 in Kampot. He started to work as a secretary of state in 1956. He worked in different ministries until April 1958.

He was appointed Minister of Finance from April 1958 to July 1958. Then Minister of Economic and Financial Affairs first from July 1958 to February 1959 and again from April 1960 to January 1961. He was again appointed Minister of Finance from 1967 to 1968.

He was the governor of National Bank of Cambodia from 1969 to 1970. He was described as a protégé of Son Sann.
