= List of ambassadors of Cambodia to China =

Ambassador of Cambodia to China
- 柬埔寨駐華大使 (Chinese) ឯកអគ្គរាជទូតកម្ពុជាប្រចាំនៅចិន (Khmer)
- Royal arms of Cambodia
- Incumbent; Khek Cai Mealy Sysoda since February 2007
- Inaugural holder: Leng Ngeth
- Formation: 1958

The Cambodian ambassador to China is the official representative of the government of the Kingdom of Cambodia to the government of the People's Republic of China.

== List of representatives ==
Diplomatic accreditation	Ambassador	Observations	Prime Minister of Cambodia	Premier of the People's Republic of China	Term end
1958	Leng Ngeth		Norodom Sihanouk	Zhou Enlai	1962
1962	Sisowath Sirik Matak		Norodom Sihanouk	Zhou Enlai	1964
1964	Truong Cang	In 1958 he was in charge of the Ministry of Foreign Affairs and International Cooperation (Cambodia)	Norodom Sihanouk	Zhou Enlai	1969
January 28, 1969	Samreth Soth	In 1959 he was Attaché Culturel at the Cambodian embassy in Paris	Norodom Sihanouk	Zhou Enlai	1969
1969	Nay Valentin	In 1964 he was Cultural Counsellor at the Cambodian embassy in Paris	Norodom Sihanouk	Zhou Enlai	1970
1970	Keo Meas	the former palace protocol officer	Norodom Sihanouk	Zhou Enlai	1972
1973	Toch Kham Doeun		Lon Nol	Zhou Enlai	1975
1976	Pich Cheang	Chargé d'affaires Pech Cheang	Khieu Samphan	Hua Guofeng	1984
May 1, 1984	Chan Youran	(1934)	Heng Samrin	Zhao Ziyang	
1990	Nory Srey	First Secretary	Heng Samrin	Li Peng	
September 1993	Khek Sysoda	Norodom Sihanouk	Li Peng	2003	
2004	Khek Loreng	From 1999 to 2002 he was ambassador in Berlin	Norodom Sihamoni	Wen Jiabao	February 2007
February 2007	Khek Caimealy Sysoda	better known as Nanou	Norodom Sihamoni	Wen Jiabao	
