= Ministry of Economy and Finance (Cambodia) =

Government ministry of Cambodia

- ក្រសួងសេដ្ឋកិច្ចនិងហិរញ្ញវត្ថុ (Khmer); Krasuang Seṭṭhakicc ning Hiraññavatthu (ALA-LC)

Agency overview
- Formed: 1993
- Jurisdiction: Government of Cambodia
- Headquarters: Phnom Penh, Cambodia
- Minister responsible: Dr. Aun Pornmoniroth, Minister of Economy and Finance
- Website: http://www.mef.gov.kh

The Ministry of Economy and Finance (MEF; Khmer: ក្រសួងសេដ្ឋកិច្ចនិងហិរញ្ញវត្ថុ, ALA-LC: Krasuang Seṭṭhakicc ning Hiraññavatthu) accounts for the administration of financial and economic policy and affair in the Kingdom of Cambodia. In accordance to the official website, the ministry was commissioned by the Royal Government of Cambodia to perform missions of guidances and administrations in economic and financial affairs. The current Minister responsible for the Ministry of Economic and Finance is Aun Porn Moniroth, as of 2013. The main ministerial office is located in Phnom Penh, while the provincial branches are located across the main capitals of each province.

The managerial structure is divided into five ranks: Minister, Secretary of State, Deputy Secretary of State, Secretary General, and Deputy Secretary General. They are responsible for the administration in the distribution and allocation of budget, creation of policy, implementing and enhance existing policies in the extension of designated departments as well as the extended departments in provincial branches. The level of authority in budget and policy approval and implementation are based on the primary and secondary ranks of the administrative figures law administration ministry of economic and financial 1.law storage city inbox national factory has been wood gold iron purchased to factory private inside country and outside country 2.law trade deposit resources go to outside country stamped tax of ministry of economic and financial 3.law global trade and website www.stoomberg.com usa Chinese Japanese others posted broncost live in website E-eccomerce sell resources 4.law financial government of all ministry salary-else-, www.bonahun.gov.kh/lawyer

== Departments ==
The departments of the Ministry include:

- Economic and Public Finance Policy Department
- Administration and Finance Department
- General Department of Taxation
- General Department of Customs and Excise
- Investment and Cooperation Department
- National Treasury
- Non-tax Revenue Department
- Financial Industry Department
- Budget Department
- Financial Affairs Department
- Local Finance Department
- Internal Audit Department
- State Property Department
- Public Procurement Department
- Personnel Department
- Legal Affairs Department
- Economic Integration and ASEAN Department
- Information Technology Department
- Resettlement Department
- Economics and Finance Institute

== Ministers of Finance 1945–1970 ==
- Ung Hy, 1945
- Penn Nouth, 1945
- Nhiek Tioulong, 1945-1946
- Son Sann, 1946–1947
- Au Chhuen, 1949-1950
- Nhiek Tioulong, 1951
- Yem Sambaur, 1954
- Pho Proeung, 1955
- Sam Sary, 1955–1956
- Huot Sam Ath, 1956
- San Yun, 1957
- Truong Cang, 1957-1958
- Son Sann, 1958-?
- Touch Kim, 1958
- Truong Cang, 1959
- Son Sann, 1961–1962
- Hou Youn, 1962
- Chai Thoul, ?-1963-?
- Hing Kunthel, ?-1966-1967
- Touch Kim, 1967–1968
- Yem Sarong, 1968–1969
- Op Kim Ang, 1969–1970

== Ministers of Finance of Khmer Republic 1970–1975 ==
- Tim Nguon, 1970
- Sok Chhong, 1970-1972
- Ith Thuy, 1972-1973
- Khy Taing Lim, 1973
- Keo Mongkry, 1973–1974
- Khy Taing Lim, 1974–1975

== Ministers of Economy of Democratic Kampuchea 1975–1979 ==
- Koy Thuon, 1975–1976
- Vorn Vet, 1976–1979

== Ministers of Finance of People's Republic of Kampuchea and State of Cambodia 1979–1993 ==
- Thiounn Thioum, 1979-1981
- Chan Phin, 1981-1986
- Chhay Than, 1986-1993

== Ministers of Economy and Finance since 1993 ==
| No. | Portrait | Name | Tenure | Length of tenure | Political party |
|---|---|---|---|---|---|
| 1 | | Sam Rainsy (1949-) | 24 September 1993 – 24 October 1994 | 1 year, 30 days | FUNCINPEC |
| 2 | | Keat Chhon (1934-) | 24 October 1994 – 23 September 2013 | 18 years, 334 days | Cambodian People's Party |
| 3 | | Aun Pornmoniroth (1965-) | 24 September 2013 - Incumbent | 12 years, 318 days | Cambodian People's Party |

== See also ==
- Economy of Cambodia
- Government of Cambodia
- National Bank of Cambodia
- Cambodia and the World Bank
