= Cambodia National Rescue Party =

Cambodian political party (2012–2017)

Cambodia National Rescue Party គណបក្សសង្រ្គោះជាតិ
- Abbreviation: CNRP
- President: Kem Sokha
- Vice Presidents: Eng Chhai Eang; Mu Sochua; Pol Hom
- Founders: Sam Rainsy; Kem Sokha
- Founded: 17 July 2012; 14 years ago
- Registered: 9 April 2013; 13 years ago
- Banned: 16 November 2017; 8 years ago
- Merger of: Sam Rainsy Party; Human Rights Party; Norodom Ranariddh Party
- Succeeded by: Cambodia National Rescue Movement; Khmer Will Party (self-declared; not legally); Candlelight Party (unofficial)
- Youth wing: CNRP Youth
- Ideology: Liberalism; Liberal democracy Civic nationalism Populism; Anti-Vietnamese sentiment
- Political position: Centre
- International affiliation: Liberal International
- Regional affiliation: Council of Asian Liberals and Democrats
- Colors
- Slogan: "សង្គ្រោះ បម្រើ ការពារ" (English: "Rescue, Serve, Protect")

Party flag

Website
- https://nationalrescueparty.org/ (defunct)

The Cambodia National Rescue Party (CNRP; Khmer: គណបក្សសង្គ្រោះជាតិ, UNGEGN: Keănăpăt Sǎngkruăh Chiat, ALA-LC: Gaṇapaks Sanggroaḥ Jāti [keanapaʔ sɑŋkruəh ciət]) was a major political party in Cambodia. It was founded in 2012 as a merger between the Sam Rainsy Party and Human Rights Party.

The party believed in the strengthening of freedom and human rights, institution of free and fair elections, and defending Cambodia's "national integrity". It became the sole challenger to the Cambodian People's Party after the 2013 election. Its official motto was "Rescue, Serve, Protect" (សង្គ្រោះ បម្រើ ការពារ Sǎngkruăh, Bǎmraoe, Kapia) and the logo for the CNRP is the rising sun.

Party leader Kem Sokha was arrested in September 2017, after which the party was in danger of being dissolved, allegedly for being part of a foreign plot to overthrow Prime Minister Hun Sen. The case was heard by the Supreme Court of Cambodia which is headed by Chief Justice Dith Munty, a member of the ruling CPP's permanent committee.

On 16 November 2017, the Supreme Court ruled to ban the CNRP. Charles Santiago, Chairman of ASEAN Parliamentarians for Human Rights, called this move "the final nail in the coffin for Cambodian democracy". As a result of the ruling, all CNRP office holders, including 489 commune chiefs and 55 MPs, lost their positions and had their seats allocated to other parties. Additionally, 118 senior party officials were banned from politics for five years. About half the party's former MPs, including its vice president Mu Sochua, had already fled Cambodia before October out of fear of arrest by the ruling party. The forced dissolution of the party prompted condemnation and calls to reverse the decision from the international community.

== Party platform ==
The seven-point policies of the CNRP:

1. A pension of 40,000 riels or US$10 a month for old people aged 65 and over.
2. A minimum wage of 600,000 riels or US$150 a month for workers.
3. A minimum wage of 1,000,000 riels or US$250 a month for public servants.
4. Guarantee of prices for farm produce (the lowest price of rice is 1,000 riels or US$0.25 per kilo) and of markets for it.
5. Free medical care for the poor.
6. Equal opportunity of the young to receive quality education and to have employment.
7. Lowering the prices of fuel, fertilizers, electricity, and interests on loans.

== Policies ==
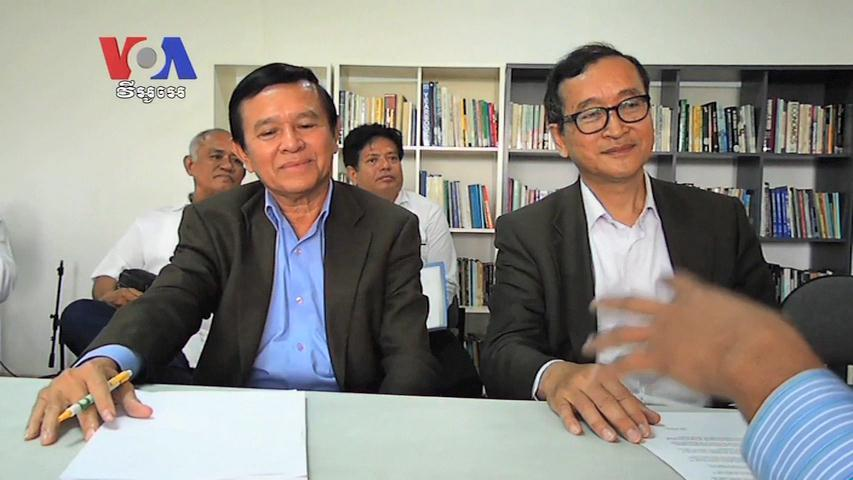
Kem Sokha and Sam Rainsy discuss merging parties in Manila, Philippines.

=== Domestic policy ===
The domestic policy of the CNRP promoted national reconciliation by banning discrimination, patronage and nepotism based on a set of principles:

- Non-violent struggle and peaceful resolution of problems.
- Respect and observance of human rights.
- Address the issue of illegal immigration through effective enforcement of the nationality law and the immigration law.
- Social justice with the state’s guarantee of human rights, freedoms and equal opportunities in the political, economic and social life.
- Pluralistic liberal democracy where power belongs to the people.
- Sustainable development putting emphasis on production for export, competitiveness and preservation of national resources.
- Propose a referendum for same-sex marriage.

=== Economy ===
The CNRP advocated a free market economy based on economic liberalism.

- Competition and equitable development.
- Production for domestic products for consumption and exportation.
- Promotion of small and medium-sized enterprises and the creation of confidence for foreign investment.

=== Education, youth and employment ===
- Human resource development with equal access to education.
- Quality and high standard education.
- Technical and professional training to equip the youth with high skills.
- Introducing student loans and scholarship plans for higher education.

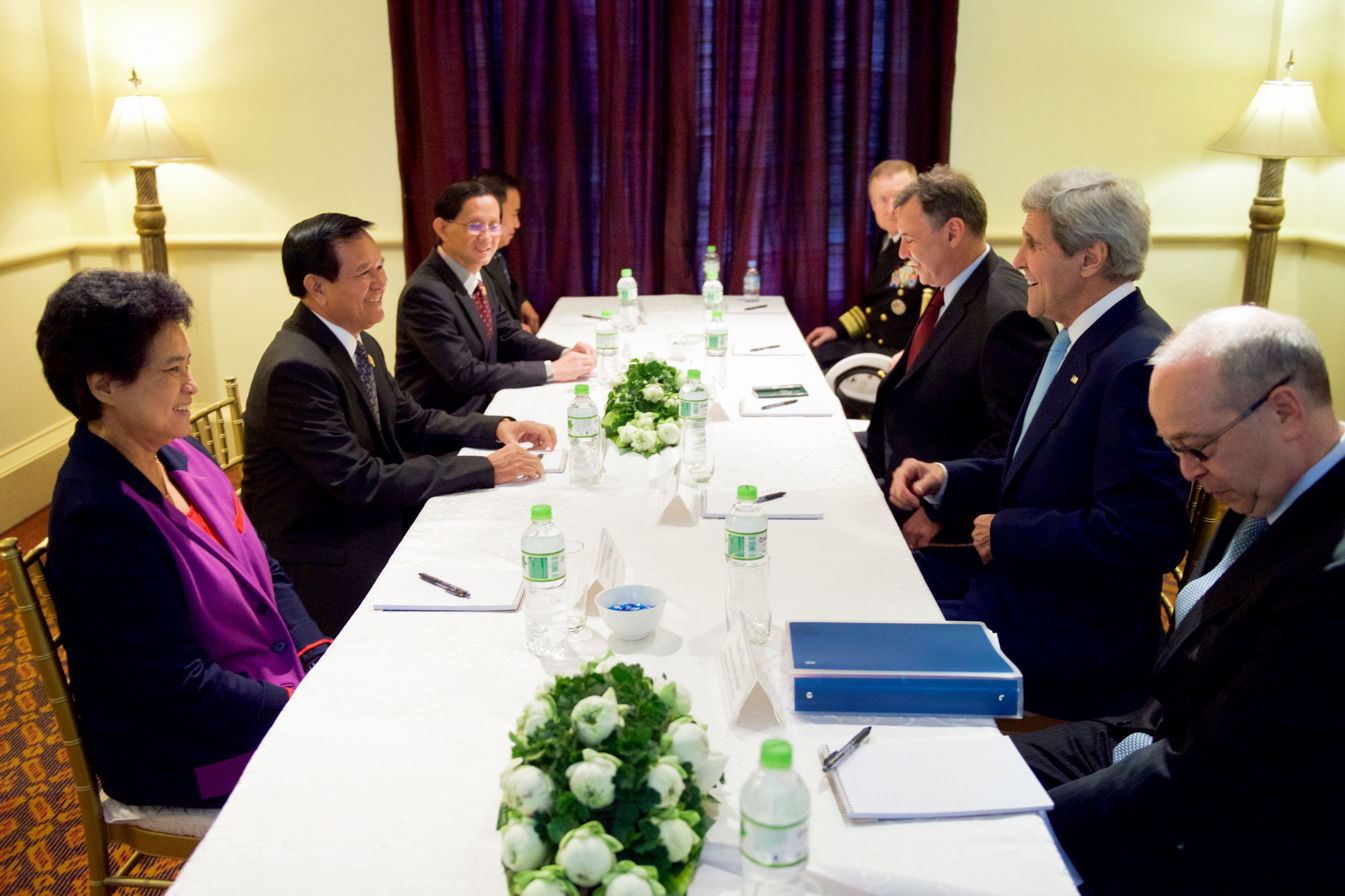
Vice President Kem Sokha and other party officials meeting with US Secretary of State John Kerry

=== Healthcare ===
- Universal health care
- Clean water, hygiene, and sanitary systems.
- Reform of the health care system by improving the expertise and ethics of medical staffing, provisions of adequate medicine, and medical equipment.

=== Agriculture ===
The CNRP called for the raising of living standards for farmers through the provision of adequate farm land and utilization of farm technology, competitiveness, improvement of the quality of farm produce, search for markets for farm produce, and fixing the interest on farm loans to one percent per month.

=== Women's rights ===
The CNRP believed in empowering all women to strengthen the foundation of Cambodian society through equal participation in all spheres of public and private life by guaranteeing opportunities to achieve women's financial security, social welfare, land, education, health, justice, and politics.

== Regional strength ==
Results of the 2013 Cambodian general election. Provinces are shaded according to vote share; those won by the CNRP are shown in blue.

Majority Minority

No.	Constituency	Seats won	Popular vote	Percentage
1	Banteay Meanchey	2 / 6	64,732	25.33%
2	Battambang	3 / 8	162,527	38.09%
3	Kampong Cham	10 / 18	457,819	51.10%
4	Kampong Chhnang	2 / 4	96,208	39.30%
5	Kampong Speu	3 / 6	186,867	46.92%
6	Kampong Thom	3 / 6	115,880	40.46%
7	Kampot	3 / 6	125,320	41.64%
8	Kandal	6 / 11	366,056	55.76%
9	Kep	0 / 1	4,165	20.84%
10	Koh Kong	0 / 1	11,017	25.12%
11	Kratié	1 / 3	59,774	41.68%
12	Mondulkiri	0 / 1	4,244	17.50%
13	Oddar Meanchey	0 / 1	21,968	26.96%
14	Pailin	0 / 1	8,959	32.57%
15	Phnom Penh	7 / 12	382,880	57.68%
16	Preah Vihear	0 / 1	19,199	22.42%
17	Prey Veng	6 / 11	287,778	49.95%
18	Pursat	1 / 4	48,217	23.98%
19	Ratanakiri	0 / 1	7,821	14.59%
20	Siem Reap	2 / 6	140,737	35.58%
21	Sihanoukville	0 / 1	30,558	34.95%
22	Stung Treng	0 / 1	6,962	14.94%
23	Svay Rieng	2 / 5	99,600	33.04%
24	Takéo	4 / 8	236,686	45.73%
Total		55 / 123	2,946,176	44.46%

=== Support base ===
The CNRP's support base was in the urban populated areas; in rural villages whose livelihood is affected by the land grabbing crisis, and young post-Khmer Rouge baby boomers.

== List of party leaders ==
No.	Name	Term start	Term end	Deputy
1	Sam Rainsy	17 July 2012	11 February 2017	Kem Sokha
2	Kem Sokha	2 March 2017	16 November 2017	Eng Chhai Eang
2	Kem Sokha	2 March 2017	16 November 2017	Mu Sochua
2	Kem Sokha	2 March 2017	16 November 2017	Pol Hom

== Organization ==
Executive Committee

1. Yim Sovann (President)
2. Mao Monyvann (Vice President)
3. Yem Ponhearith (Honorary Chairman)
4. Kuoy Bunroeun
5. Kem Monovithya
6. Ky Wandara
7. Vann Chan

Standing Committee

1. Kem Sokha (President)
2. Pol Hom (Vice President)
3. Mu Sochua (Vice President)
4. Eng Chhai Eang (Vice President)
5. Yim Sovann (Secretary-General)
6. Ou Chanrith
7. Yem Ponhearith
8. Ky Wandara
9. Ho Vann
10. Mao Monyvann
11. Kuoy Bunroeun
12. Kem Monovithya

13. Vann Chan
14. Tioulong Saumura
15. Kimsour Phirith
16. Thach Setha
17. Son Chhay
18. Cheam Channy
19. Toun Youkda
20. Lim Bunsidaret
21. Keo Sambath
22. Ke Sovannaroth
23. Men Sothavarin

== Election results ==
=== General election ===
Election	Leader	Votes			Seats		Position	Government
Election	Leader	#	%	±	#	±	Position	Government
2013	Sam Rainsy	2,946,176	44.5	▲15.9	55 / 123	▲26	2nd	CPP

=== Communal elections ===
Election	Leader	Votes			Chiefs		Councillors		Position
Election	Leader	#	%	±	#	±	#	±	Position
2017	Kem Sokha	3,056,824	43.8	▲13.1	489 / 1,646	▲449	5,007 / 11,572	▲2,052	2nd

== See also ==
- 2013–2014 Cambodian protests
