= Sam Sary =

Cambodian politician (1917–1962)

- សម សារី
- Born: 6 March 1917; Kampong Speu, Cambodia, French Indochina
- Disappeared: 1962
- Spouse: In Em
- Children: Sam Rainsy

Ambassador to the United Kingdom
- In office January 1958 – 1959
- Appointed by: Norodom Sihanouk

Personal details
- Party: Sangkum

Sam Sary (Khmer: សម សារី; 6 March 1917 – late 1962) was a Cambodian politician who participated in the so-called Bangkok Plot against Prince Norodom Sihanouk. He was a son of Sam Nhean, a prominent politician in the 1940s, and father of Sam Rainsy, the leader of Cambodia's main opposition party. He was a close confidant of the then Prince Norodom Sihanouk, but had a falling-out with the Prince when he was exposed in corruption, selling import licenses and a second time during his tenure as a Cambodian ambassador to London in 1958, for beating his pregnant servant. He was alleged to have beaten her so badly that she escaped to the protection of the London police. The scandal made headlines in the London tabloids and he was recalled to Cambodia and stripped of all of his duties. He disappeared mysteriously in 1962.

== Political life ==
Sam Sary was Deputy Prime Minister in Prince Norodom Sihanouk's government in the 1950s. He was Minister of Finance from 1955 to 1956. He played an important role in seeking full independence for Cambodia, in helping the newly independent Cambodia avoid partition at the Geneva conference (1954), and in helping King Norodom Sihanouk found the Sangkum Reastr Niyum (1955 onwards).

He was involved in election fraud and intimidations, Keng Vannsak recalled:

The evil genius behind the repression was Sam Sary—a bestial man. As an investigating magistrate in the 1940s, he had beaten suspects to death with his own hands. Then he went study in France. In 1955, he joined the Sangkum and became Sihanouk's closest aide ... After Sihanouk decided to use strong-arm tactics, Sary handed out money and arms to hire ruffians to come and break our meetings.

=== The Sam Sary Affair ===
In January 1958, Sam Sary was appointed by Norodom Sihanouk as Cambodia's ambassador to London, thus extricating him from a scandal involving smuggling of large quantities of high grade Cambodian pepper. According to Time magazine, he brought an entourage of four women who were his official wife, with their five children, including Sam Rainsy and three mistresses. Six months later, Sam Sary was involved in another scandal when one of his female servants—Iv Eng Seng, who bore him a child—went to the London police, accusing him of severely beating her for "minor mistakes". By other accounts, her name was Soeung Son Maly and she used to date Saloth Sar (Pol Pot), later dumping him for more prosperous Sam Sary. Sam Sary was recalled to Phnom Penh, but not before he had put his side of the story to the British press. He admitted to having beaten his servant, saying:

I corrected her by hitting her with a Cambodian string whip. I never hit her on the face, always across the back and the thighs—a common sort of punishment in my country.

He argued his right to do so because

the embassy is "Cambodia in London."

After coming back to Cambodia, Sam Sary became more and more anti-Sihanouk. Despite the risk of incurring Sihanouk's displeasure, Sam Sary started a newspaper that was openly critical of the Prince's policies. He tried to start his own political party but without success. His anti-Sihanouk activities were dubbed the Sam Sary Affairs.

Some commentators contend that Sam Sary worked with U.S. intelligence services, which he might have contacted in 1956 while visiting the U.S. On 13 January 1959, in a speech delivered in Kampong Cham, Sihanouk told his listeners that he knew about U.S. intelligence plots to overthrow him. While this speech had not clearly implicated Sam Sary, a week after the speech was delivered, he fled to Thailand. After a shadowy existence in exile, he disappeared in 1962. His son Sam Rainsy asserts that his father was killed in Pakse, Laos on the orders of Son Ngoc Thanh in late 1962 or early 1963.

== See also ==
- History of Cambodia
- List of people who disappeared mysteriously (2000–present)

== Bibliography ==
- Chandler, David P. A History of Cambodia
- Osborne, Milton E. Sihanouk: Prince of Light, Prince of Darkness
- Short, Philip Pol Pot: Anatomy of Nightmare
