= Kem Sokha =

Cambodian politician (born 1953)

- កឹម សុខា
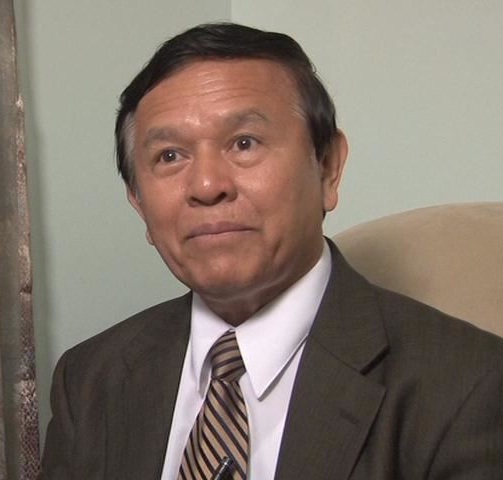
- Sokha in 2013

Leader of the Opposition
- In office 16 November 2015 – 31 January 2017
- Prime Minister: Hun Sen
- Preceded by: Sam Rainsy
- Succeeded by: Position abolished

First Vice President of the National Assembly
- In office 26 August 2014 – 30 October 2015
- President: Heng Samrin
- Preceded by: Nguon Nhel
- Succeeded by: You Hockry
Additional positions
President of the Cambodia National Rescue Party
In office 2 March 2017 – 16 November 2017
Deputy	Pol Hom; Mu Sochua; Eng Chhai Eang
Preceded by	Sam Rainsy
Succeeded by	None, party dissolved
Vice President of the Cambodia National Rescue Party
In office 1 April 2013 – 2 March 2017
President	Sam Rainsy
Preceded by	Position established
Succeeded by	Pol Hom; Mu Sochua; Eng Chhai Eang
President of the Human Rights Party
In office 22 July 2007 – 1 April 2013
Deputy	Son Soubert; Pen Sovan
Preceded by	Position established
Succeeded by	Son Soubert
President of the Cambodian Center for Human Rights
In office 3 October 2002 – 1 May 2007
Preceded by	Position established
Succeeded by	Ou Virak
Member of the National Assembly
In office 24 September 2008 – 3 September 2017
Succeeded by	You Hockry
Constituency	Kampong Cham
In office 14 June 1993 – 26 July 1998
Constituency	Takéo
Member of the Senate
In office 1999–2002

Personal details
- Born: 27 June 1953 (age 73) Tram Kak, Takéo, Cambodia, French Indochina
- Party: Independent (2002–2007; 2017–present); Cambodia National Rescue Party (2012–2017); Human Rights Party (2007–2012); FUNCINPEC (1999–2002); Buddhist Liberal Democratic Party (1993–1999); Khmer People's National Liberation Front (1992–1993)
- Spouse: Te Chanmono (m. 1980)
- Children: 2, including Monovithya
- Education: University of Chemistry and Technology, Prague (M.Sc.); Royal University of Law and Economics
- Profession: Activist; Politician

Kem Sokha (Khmer: កឹម សុខា, romanized: Keŭm Sŏkha; born 27 June 1953) is a Cambodian former politician and activist who most recently served as the President of the Cambodia National Rescue Party (CNRP). He served as the Minority Leader, the highest-ranking opposition parliamentarian, of the National Assembly from December 2016 to January 2017, and previously as the First Vice President of the National Assembly from August 2014 to October 2015. He represented Kampong Cham as its Member of Parliament (MP) from 2008 to 2017. From 2007 to 2012, Kem was the leader of the Human Rights Party, which he founded.

Kem was arrested and imprisoned at a detention centre in Tbong Khmum Province on 3 September 2017 under allegations of treason. In November 2017, the CNRP was dissolved, and 118 of its members, including Kem, were banned from politics for five years. On 10 September 2018, more than a year after his arrest, he was released on bail, and subsequently placed under house arrest. On 10 November 2019, Kem was released from house arrest.

In March 2023, he was convicted and sentenced to 27 years of house arrest. He was pardoned in May 2026.

== Education ==
Kem Sokha has stated to Voice of America in 2018 that he pursued a law degree at the Royal University of Law and Economics in Phnom Penh, but dropped out in his second year before accepting an academic scholarship to Czechoslovakia (now the Czech Republic) in 1981. He studied at the University of Chemistry and Technology, Prague, and graduated with a Master of Science degree in chemistry in 1986.

== Political career ==
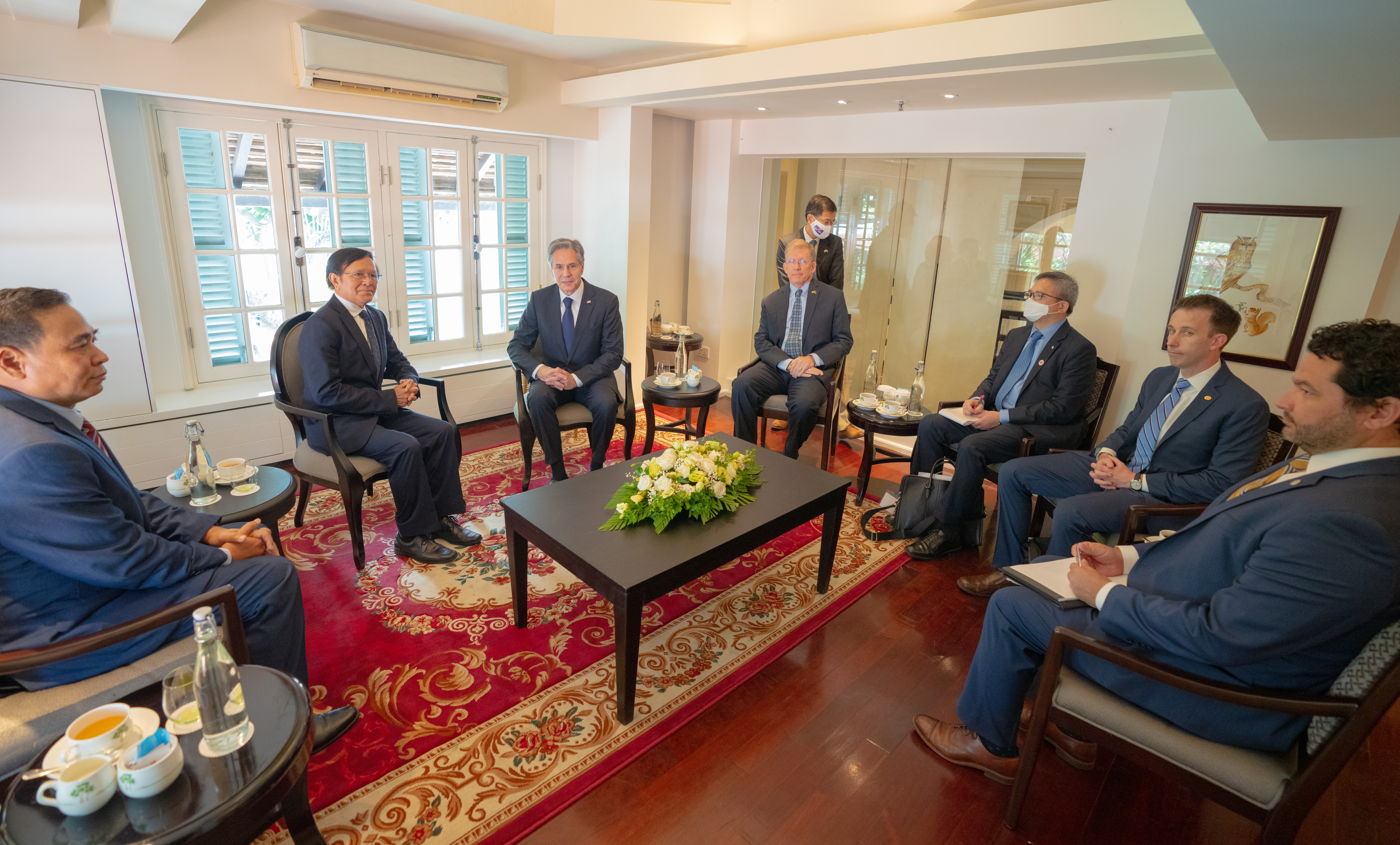
Kem Sokha in a meeting with U.S. Secretary of State Antony Blinken in August 2022.

His political career began in 1993, when he was elected a representative for Takéo Province; at that time he was a member of Son Sann's Buddhist Liberal Democratic Party. In 1999, he joined the royalist FUNCINPEC and subsequently elected a senator. He resigned from his Senate seat in 2001. In 2002, he founded the Cambodian Center for Human Rights but left that organisation to join politics in 2005. He founded the Human Rights Party, which came third in the 2008 elections.

Kem Sokha is well known for his weekly town hall meetings at local level throughout the country. He was the first to introduce a free and open forum discussing issues concerning civic and political rights, as well as social and economic development, at village level in Cambodia. Kem Sokha is known for his non-violent, political tolerant policy standing on democratic and unity principles. His words are often quoted and repeated by ordinary Cambodians. His phrase "Do Min Do" (literal translation to English: "Change or no change") became the anthem for the Cambodia National Rescue Party's election Campaign in July 2013, which drew an unprecedented amount of youth participation. Ahead of the election he also caused significant controversy by claiming that the Tuol Sleng Genocide Museum documenting crimes against humanity by the Khmer Rouge regime is a fabrication created by the Vietnamese government.

On 26 August 2014, Sokha was elected by the National Assembly as its First Vice President with 116 votes, the first opposition MP to hold the office. On 30 October 2015, he was ousted from the vice presidency by a vote of 68–0 following disagreements with the ruling party. On 9 September 2016, after months under house arrest, Sokha was sentenced to five months in prison after refusing to appear in court for questioning in a prostitution case against him. He was later granted a royal pardon by King Norodom Sihamoni. Following his release, he was officially appointed as Minority Leader. However, the positions of Minority Leader and Majority Leader were abolished altogether by the National Assembly on 31 January 2017 following a proposal by Prime Minister Hun Sen.

On 2 March 2017, Sokha was elected president of the Cambodia National Rescue Party at the party's congress, along with three other deputies. Under his leadership, the party made sweeping gains in the June 2017 local elections, winning 482 of 1,646 communes.

=== Treason allegations ===
In September 2017, the Phnom Penh Municipal Court charged Sokha with "treason and espionage", and for allegedly orchestrating the 2014 Veng Sreng street protests. He was arrested at his home on September 3, 2017. Hun Sen and other Cambodian government officials alleged that Sokha was conspiring with the United States of America. Sokha's lawyers have alleged violations of their client's rights under Article 149 of the Criminal Procure Code. He was released on bail on 10 September 2018, more than a year after his arrest, but was placed under house arrest. He was released from house arrest on 10 November 2019 but was banned from travelling outside the country and taking part in political activities.

In March 2023, Sokha was convicted of treason and barred from contacting anyone except for his relatives without permission of prosecutors. Sokha's appeal of his sentence started in January 2024, though was subsequently suspended in September 2024 and did not resume until April 2026. On 30 April 2026, the Phnom Penh Court of Appeal upheld Sokha's conviction, extending his de facto house arrest and adding an additional five-year travel ban. He was later pardoned on 25 May 2026 after being granted a royal pardon issued by acting head of state Hun Sen. However, he is still subject to the five-year travel ban imposed on 30 April, and his political rights are still revoked.

== See also ==
- Cambodian Center for Human Rights

Political offices
Preceded by Sam Rainsy	Minority Leader of the National Assembly; 2016–2017	Succeeded by Position abolished
Preceded by Nguon Nhel	Vice President of the National Assembly of Cambodia; 2014–2015	Succeeded by You Hockry
New office	Member of the Senate; 1999–2001	Succeeded by Chhim Siek Leng
Party political offices
Political offices
Preceded by Sam Rainsy	President of the Cambodia National Rescue Party; 2017	Succeeded by Party dissolved
New office	Vice President of the Cambodia National Rescue Party; 2012–2017	Succeeded by Pol Hom; Mu Sochua; Eng Chhai Eang
New office	President of the Human Rights Party; 2007–2012	Succeeded by Son Soubert
