= Council of Asian Liberals and Democrats =

Political organization

- Formation: 10 December 1993; 32 years ago
- Type: Regional organization
- Legal status: Active
- Purpose: Liberalism
- Headquarters: Taipei, Taiwan
- Region served: Asia
- Website: cald.org

The Council of Asian Liberals and Democrats (CALD) is a regional organization of liberal democratic political parties in Asia.

== History and details ==
The council was created on 10 December 1993, in a meeting in Taipei, Taiwan. There are nine member parties, an associate member, and one party with observer status. Currently, many democrats in Asia have a relationship with CALD. CALD has also opened its membership to like-minded individuals, and regularly engages with non-member political parties from Japan and South Korea with which it shares the same democratic values. The Democratic Party of Japan is one of the examples.

For the convenience of particular members, they also accept individual members, like the situation in Hong Kong. The Democratic Party of Hong Kong is represented in CALD by Martin Lee and Sin Chung Kai. The third individual member of the CALD was Indonesia's ex-President Abdurrahman Wahid (1940–2009). Aung San Suu Kyi and Corazon Aquino (1933–2009) are honorary members of CALD.

The CALD has been sanctioned by the People's Republic of China as a "diehard "Taiwan independence" separatist" organization for promoting Taiwanese independence. The council has called the sanctions unfortunate and said they would not undermine the advocacy work it is engaged in.

== Full members ==
| Country | Name | Government | Political wing |
|---|---|---|---|
| Cambodia | Cambodia National Rescue Movement | in exile | Centre |
| Indonesia | Indonesian Democratic Party of Struggle | confidence and supply | Centre-left |
| Indonesia | National Awakening Party | junior party in government coalition | Centre |
| Malaysia | Malaysian People's Movement Party | extraparliamentary opposition | Centre |
| Mongolia | Civil Will-Green Party | junior party in government coalition | Centre |
| Philippines | Liberal Party | in opposition | Centre to centre-left |
| Singapore | Singapore Democratic Party | extraparliamentary opposition | Centre to centre-left |
| Taiwan | Democratic Progressive Party | in government | Centre to centre-left |
| Thailand | Democrat Party | in opposition | Centre to centre-right |

== Observer parties ==
| Country | Name | Government | Political wing |
|---|---|---|---|
| Myanmar | National League for Democracy | under military junta | Centre |
| Japan | Constitutional Democratic Party of Japan | in opposition | Centre to centre-left |
