= Majority Leader (Cambodia) =

Majority Leader of the National Assembly of Cambodia
- ប្រធានក្រុមភាគច្រើននៃរដ្ឋសភា
- Parliament of Cambodia; National Assembly of Cambodia
- Style: His Excellency
- Seat: Phnom Penh
- Formation: 22 January 2015; 11 years ago
- First holder: Sar Kheng
- Final holder: Sar Kheng
- Abolished: 31 January 2017; 9 years ago
- Salary: 11,536,000 KHR (MP's salary)

The Majority Leader (Khmer: ប្រធានក្រុមភាគច្រើន) is the leader of the parliamentary delegation of the largest party in the National Assembly of Cambodia. Though not directly the head of government, the Majority Leader acts as the leader of the members of parliament from the ruling party. It is similar to the Leader of the House of Commons in the Westminster system.

The only Majority Leader was Sar Kheng. The position was abolished by Parliament on 31 January 2017.

== List of majority leaders ==
| Portrait | Name | Term of office | | Political party | Prime Minister |
| Portrait | Name | Took office | Left office | Political party | Prime Minister |
|---|---|---|---|---|---|
| | Sar Kheng | 22 January 2015 | 31 January 2017 | Cambodian People's Party | Hun Sen |
