= National University of Management =

University in Phnom Penh, Cambodia

Coordinates: 11.5746°N 104.9186°E

- សាកលវិទ្យាល័យជាតិគ្រប់គ្រង
- Type: National
- Established: 1983; 43 years ago
- Rector: Dr. Hor Peng
- Location: Christopher Howes St. (96), Phnom Penh, Cambodia
- Website: num.edu.kh

The National University of Management (NUM; Khmer: សាកលវិទ្យាល័យជាតិគ្រប់គ្រង, UNGEGN: Sakâlôvĭtyéaloăy Chéatĕ Króbkrông) is a business school in Phnom Penh, Cambodia, located near Phnom Penh Railway Station. The university provides training programmes to all people in the areas of management, economics, commerce, IT, business law, tourism, and foreign languages, accompanied by research and development in response to the needs of the job market.

== History ==
National University of Management was founded in 1983 as the Economics Science Institute (ESI), and it received assistance from the National Economics University in Hanoi, Vietnam until 1991 before becoming the National University of Management. As a result of this program, students were enrolled in a five-year undergraduate programme where the Vietnamese language was used as the main language of instruction during this time period. A comprehensive curriculum was devised by the visiting faculty from Hanoi that covered major fields in finance, commerce, agriculture, industry, and socialist planning.

With the opening up of Cambodia to the international community during the early 1990s, the ESI was renamed the Faculty of Business (FOB). Initial support for the FOB was provided by the Asia Foundation and later, through a three-year USAID grant (1994 to 1997), by Georgetown University and the University of San Francisco.

This support provided teacher training and institutional development, and encouraged transformation of the curriculum along the lines of an international or American-style business school. Marketing and accounting majors were introduced during this period, and the length of the undergraduate programme was reduced from five to four years of study. Commercial law courses were added to the curriculum by the University of San Francisco Law School.

In 2004, the FOB was transformed into the National University of Management (NUM); programme offerings were expanded to include the fields of tourism and hospitality management, finance and banking, and MIS. NUM opened the first MBA program in Cambodia in cooperation with the University Utara Malaysia (UUM), a state-sponsored university in northern Malaysia. NUM maintains a five-year faculty exchange and research program with the University of Antwerp, Belgium and has recently opened a Center for Entrepreneurship and Development in partnership with Fisk University (Nashville, United States) and Tennessee State University, sponsored by UNCF/USAID.

Currently, more than 10,000 students attend courses at NUM's main campus in Phnom Penh. NUM operates a full Bachelor of Business Administration degree programme in Battambang with more than 700 students attending courses at NUM's provincial campus.

== Academic programmes ==
- Bachelor's degrees (four-year): Management, Marketing, Accounting and Finance, Finance and Banking, Tourism and Hospitality, English Literature, Eco-Business, Law, Faculty of Information Technology
- Master's degrees (two-year): Business Administration, Accounting and Finance, Economics, Information Technology (IT), Tourism and Hospitality
- Ph.D. (three-year): Business Administration, Tourism and Hospitality, Economics
- Certificate programs: Business Administration-Marketing, Economics, Information Technology, Accounting and Finance, Finance and Banking, Foreign Language (Korean, Japanese)
