= Human Rights Party (Cambodia) =

Human Rights Party គណបក្សសិទ្ធិមនុស្ស
- Founder: Kem Sokha
- Founded: 22 July 2007
- Dissolved: 17 July 2012
- Merged into: Cambodia National Rescue Party
- Membership (2007): 200,000–500,000
- Ideology: Grassroots democracy Liberal democracy Populism

The Human Rights Party (Khmer: គណបក្សសិទ្ធិមនុស្ស, UNGEGN: Kônâbâks Sĕtthĭ Mônŭss, ALA-LC: Gaṇapaks Siddhi Manuss) was a Cambodian political party founded on 22 July 2007 by Kem Sokha. Critics allege that its foundation is meant to weaken opposition parties and is driven by the ruling party. This sentiment, however, seems to be driven by the ruling party themselves as Kem Sokha has long been a very vocal critic of the ruling Cambodian People's Party. At the time of its foundation, the party claimed to have between 200,000 and 500,000 members nationwide.

Human Rights Party is the first party in Cambodia to adopt the check and balance system, changing the culture of one-man-ruling parties, which most parties in Cambodia adopt. It is also the first party in Cambodia to have its major leaders elected in its convention. Its popularity has been dramatically increasing in Cambodia, especially in the countryside.

In the July 2008 parliamentary elections, the ruling party won a landslide majority, and the Human Rights Party took third place.

In 2012, it merged with the Sam Rainsy Party to form the Cambodia National Rescue Party.

== Electoral performance ==
=== General election ===
Election	Leader	Votes			Seats		Position	Government
Election	Leader	#	%	±	#	±	Position	Government
2008	Kem Sokha	397,816	6.6	▲6.6	3 / 123	▲3	▲3rd	CPP–FUNCINPEC

=== Communal election ===
Election	Leader	Votes			Communes		Councillors		Position
Election	Leader	#	%	±	#	±	#	±	Position
2012	Kem Sokha	580,483	9.9	▲9.9	18 / 1,633	▲18	800 / 11,459	▲800	▲3rd
