= Sam Rainsy =

Cambodian politician (born 1949)

- សម រង្ស៊ី
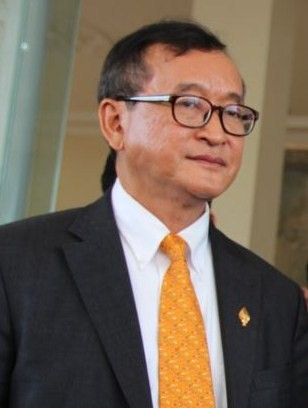
- Rainsy in 2015

Leader of the Opposition
- In office 22 January 2015 – 16 November 2015
- Prime Minister: Hun Sen
- Deputy: Kem Sokha
- Preceded by: Position established
- Succeeded by: Kem Sokha

President of the Cambodia National Rescue Party
- In office 17 July 2012 – 11 February 2017
- Vice President: Kem Sokha
- Preceded by: Position established
- Succeeded by: Kem Sokha

President of the Sam Rainsy Party
- In office 2 November 1995 – 17 July 2012
- Preceded by: Position established
- Succeeded by: Kong Korm

Member of the National Assembly
- In office 5 August 2014 – 16 November 2015
- Constituency: Kampong Cham
- In office 24 September 2008 – 15 March 2011
- Constituency: Kampong Cham
- In office 25 November 1998 – 3 February 2005
- Constituency: Kampong Cham
- In office 14 June 1993 – 22 June 1995
- Constituency: Siem Reap

Minister of Economy and Finance
- In office 24 September 1993 – 24 October 1994
- Prime Minister: Norodom Ranariddh; Hun Sen
- Preceded by: Chhay Than as Minister of Finance
- Succeeded by: Keat Chhon

Personal details
- Born: 10 March 1949 (age 77) Phnom Penh, Cambodia, French Indochina
- Citizenship: Cambodia; France
- Party: Cambodia National Rescue Party (2012–2017); Sam Rainsy Party (1995–2012); FUNCINPEC (1989–1995)
- Height: 1.75 m (5 ft 9 in)
- Spouse: Tioulong Saumura (m. 1971)
- Relations: Nhiek Tioulong (father-in-law)
- Children: 3
- Parent: Sam Sary (father)
- Education: INSEAD (MBA); Sciences Po; University of Paris II Panthéon-Assas
- Profession: Economist; Politician
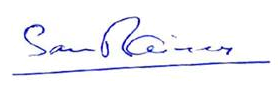
- Signature
- Website: rainsysam.com

Sam Rainsy (Note: Khmer: សម រង្ស៊ី, UNGEGN: Sâm Rôngsi, ALA-LC: Sam Raṅs′ī [sɑm reaŋsiː]) (born 10 March 1949) is a Cambodian politician, activist and economist who previously served as the Leader of the Opposition. He is now the interim leader of the Cambodia National Rescue Party due to the continued ban on political activity by the party's leader, Kem Sokha. Between 1998 and 2017, he was the leading opposition figure in Cambodian politics and the main challenger to prime minister Hun Sen and the Cambodian People's Party. Since 2015, he has lived in exile, having been banned from entering the country.

Sam Rainsy became a member of parliament for Siem Reap in 1993 in elections organized by UNTAC. He has had his parliamentary immunity revoked three times. He was MP for Siem Reap from 1993 until 1995 when he was expelled from the Constituent Assembly. A co-founder of the Cambodia National Rescue Party (CNRP), Rainsy was previously a member of the royalist Funcinpec Party and served as the Minister of Economy and Finance during Norodom Ranariddh's administration from 1993 until his sacking in 1994. In June 1995, he was expelled from the National Assembly, and formed the Khmer Nation Party (KNP), which changed its name before the 1998 elections to the Sam Rainsy Party (SRP) to avoid registration issues. From 2000 to 2002 and again from 2012 to 2014, Rainsy was the chairperson of the Council of Asian Liberals and Democrats.

Sam Rainsy went into exile on February 3, 2005, citing fear of arrest after a vote in the National Assembly removed parliamentary immunity from himself and fellow SRP MPs Chea Poch and Cheam Channy. Rainsy faced multiple criminal defamation charges after accusing the Cambodian People's Party and Funcinpec of corruption in the formation of the current coalition government. He has also accused Prime Minister Hun Sen of involvement in the 2004 murder of SRP-affiliated union leader Chea Vichea. In September 2010, Rainsy was tried in absentia and sentenced to 10 years in prison for charges widely believed to be politically motivated. In 2012, the Sam Rainsy Party merged with the Human Rights Party to form the Cambodia National Rescue Party. Following his resignation from the Sam Rainsy Party to lead the newly formed opposition party, Kong Korm succeeded him as party leader in November 2012. On 12 July 2013, King Norodom Sihamoni granted a royal pardon to Rainsy at the request of the Prime Minister, Hun Sen, allowing the opposition leader to return to Cambodia without threat of imprisonment, although he remained ineligible for candidacy in the 2013 general election. Rainsy returned to Cambodia on 19 July 2013 where hundreds of thousands of his supporters waited along the roads. The CNRP gained 55 seats in the National Assembly although Sam Rainsy and Kem Sokha have denied these results and accused the ruling party of poll fraud. The opposition boycotted parliament in September 2013, until July 2014.

In 2016, Rainsy again left Cambodia after being charged with defamation and incitement for accusing Hun Sen's government of orchestrating the high-profile murder of political activist Kem Ley. In October 2016, Rainsy's request for a royal pardon was rejected by the Prime Minister, Hun Sen. In February 2017, Rainsy resigned as President of the Cambodia National Rescue Party, and left the party just four months before local elections and a year before the general election. As of 20 February 2017, he has been banned from political activity. In 2019, Rainsy announced he would return to Cambodia on Independence Day, but was blocked following the Cambodian government's intervention with airlines and with Thailand, where he would have transited.

== Early life and political career ==
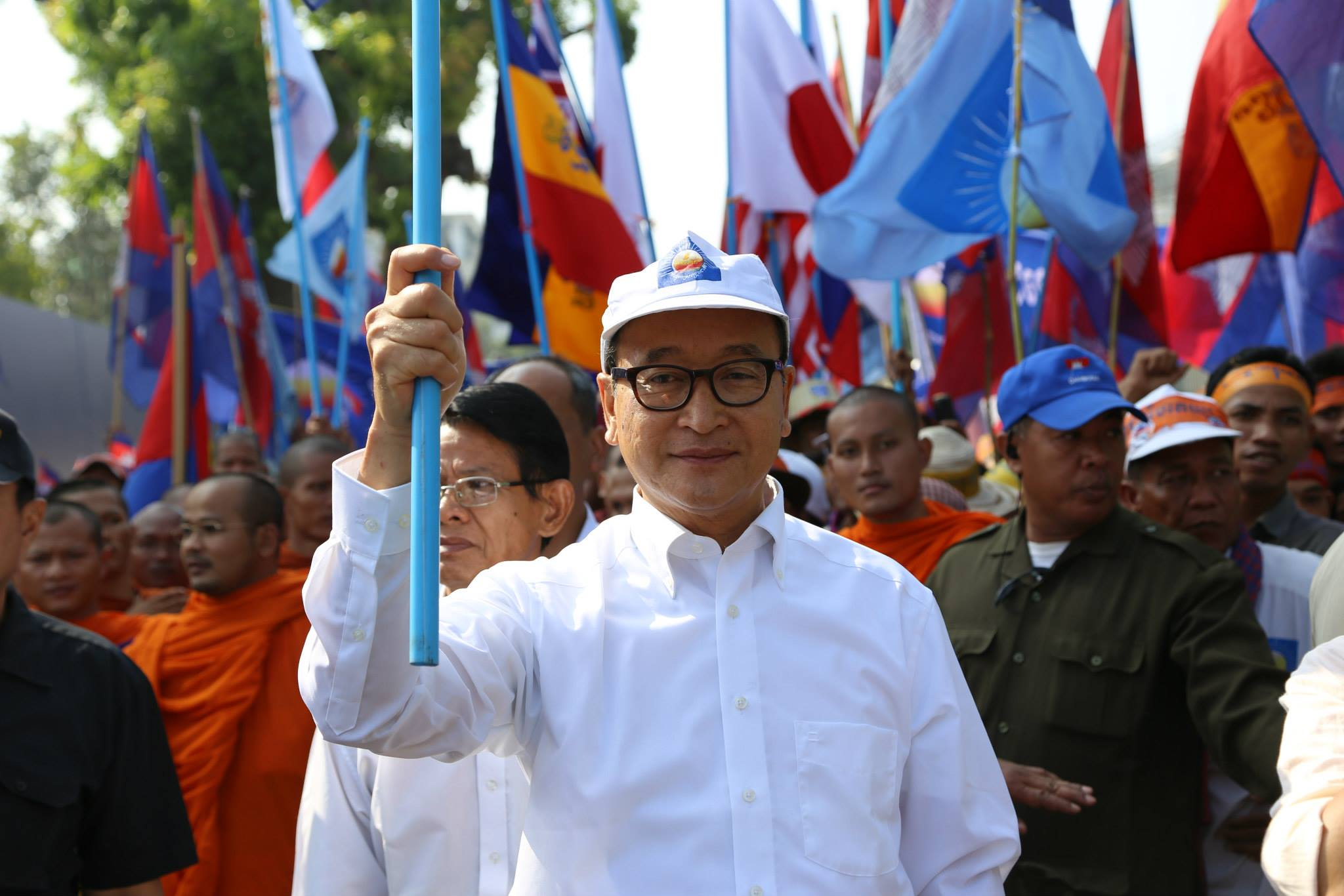
Rainsy leading a mass demonstration in Phnom Penh on 24 October 2013.

Sam Rainsy was born in Phnom Penh on 10 March 1949. He moved to France in 1965, studied there and then worked as an investment manager and executive director in a variety of Parisian financial companies. He became a member of the Funcinpec Party, and after returning to Cambodia in 1992 was elected a member of parliament for Siem Reap Province the following year. He became Minister of Finance, but was expelled from the party after losing a vote of no-confidence in 1994. In 1995, he founded the Khmer Nation Party (KNP), which changed its name before the 1998 elections to the Sam Rainsy Party (SRP) to avoid registration issues. In the 2003 elections, it polled 22% of the vote.

At that time, the U.S. Embassy in Phnom Penh said it was "deeply concerned" that the government appeared to be trying to "silence the opposition". Other embassies, local and international organizations shared the same concerns. Sam was tried in absentia on 22 December 2005 in relation to the defamation lawsuits. The court sentenced him to 18 months in prison and ordered him to pay around US$14,000 in fines and compensation. On 5 February 2006, Rainsy received a Royal Pardon by Norodom Sihamoni at Hun Sen's request. He then returned to Cambodia on 10 February 2006.

In April 2008, Rainsy accused Cambodia's then foreign minister Hor Namhong of having served under the Khmer Rouge as director of the Beoung Trabek prison, where torture and murder was carried out. Hor Namhong responded by suing Rainsy for defamation and this was upheld by Cambodia's courts, but Hor Namhong's case was rejected in April 2011 by France's Cour de Cassation.

Following Rainsy's announcement on 7 July 2013, that he would return to Cambodia for the national legislative elections, he was pardoned for the "defamation" of Hor Namhong by King Norodom Sihamoni at the request of Hun Sen and returned to Cambodia on 19 July 2013.

On 22 July 2014, the Cambodian political crisis ongoing since 2013 was officially ended in a deal reached between the CPP and CNRP. The opposition also agreed to accept their seats in parliament, thus ending the longest political deadlock in Cambodian history. The CNRP was also given leadership roles in parliament, with Kem Sokha as the first vice president of the National Assembly and other politicians chairing 5 of the 10 parliamentary commissions. Rainsy proposed the National Assembly to formally recognize an official opposition and pushed for a full shadow cabinet. Such changes would allow him to debate directly with Hun Sen, similar to the Westminster system.

On 13 November 2015, the royal pardon that had been given to Rainsy in 2013 over the "defamation" of Hor Namhong was withdrawn. Three days later, he was unanimously removed from the National Assembly by the Cambodian People's Party while facing several charges. Sam Rainsy stood by his original claims that Hor Namhong had been responsible for prison deaths under the Khmer Rouge. On 1 December 2015, the Phnom Penh Municipal Court summoned Sam Rainsy in absentia to clarify a statement he posted to his Facebook account following a defamation complaint by parliamentary president Heng Samrin. Less than two weeks earlier, the same court had issued another summons for Sam Rainsy to appear for questioning over his alleged involvement in using a fake map to resolve a border dispute with Vietnam.

On 11 February 2017, Rainsy resigned as President of the Cambodia National Rescue Party following a proposed amendment by Hun Sen barring convicted criminals from leading a political party. His resignation was accepted by his party on 12 February. His successor as leader, Kem Sokha, was arrested on 3 September 2017, and, as of March 2018, remains in prison without trial. Sam Rainsy responded by creating the Cambodia National Rescue Movement (CNRM), which seeks to increase international pressure on the Hun Sen regime. The US said in February 2018 that it was suspending or curtailing programs that support the Cambodian military, local government authorities and a major taxation body. Germany in February 2018 suspended visas for Cambodian government members in light of the crackdown on the opposition. In the same month, the EU said it was considering targeted measures against the Hun Sen regime.

In March 2018, Kem Sokha's period of detention without trial was extended for six months, meaning that he will be in prison when the country's national parliamentary elections scheduled for July 2018 takes place. In the same month, Hun Sen rejected a proposal from Sam Rainsy for talks on a way of ending the crisis.

In August 2019, Rainsy announced his intention to return to Cambodia on Independence Day on 9 November. The government confirmed that they would arrest him should he return on that date. The Cambodian government responded by threatening any airline that transported him to Cambodia with "serious consequences". The government of Thailand, from where he planned to travel to Cambodia by land, also denied him entry at the request of Cambodia. Rainsy was denied boarding on a Thai Airways flight from Paris to Bangkok, from where he planned to travel to Cambodia, on 7 November, despite having a valid ticket. He said he will find another way to return to his country.

During the COVID-19 pandemic, Sam Rainsy advocated the introduction of immunity passports based on tests for antibodies as a way to restart the international economy.

In October 2020, Rainsy and the CNRP denounced China's military expansionism which involved agreement to establish military bases in Cambodia following the demolition of a US-built facility at the Ream Naval Base.

== Family ==
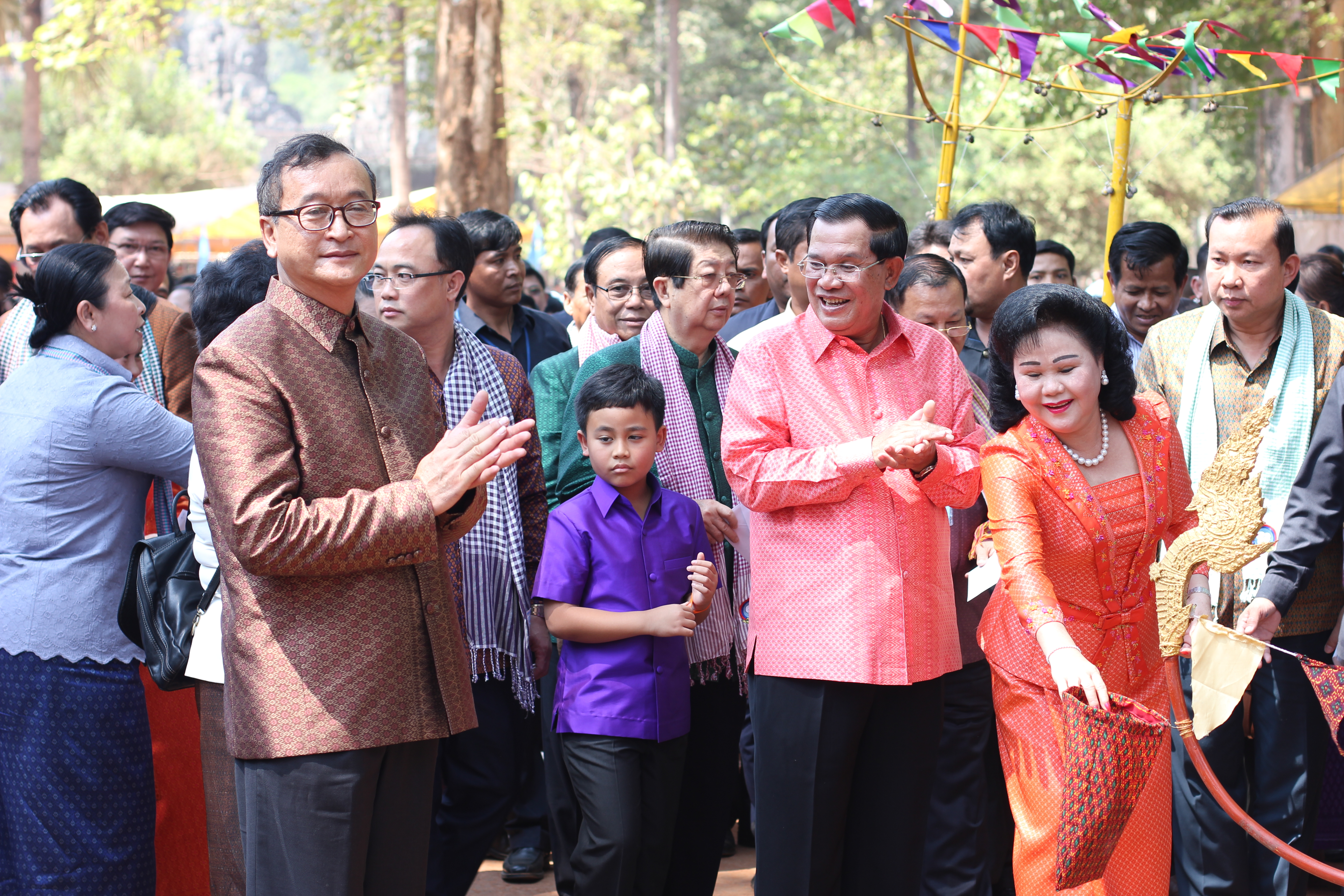
Sam Rainsy and Hun Sen turn the page in 2015 by calling for a "Culture of Dialogue" between the two political factions. The peace is short-lived, however.

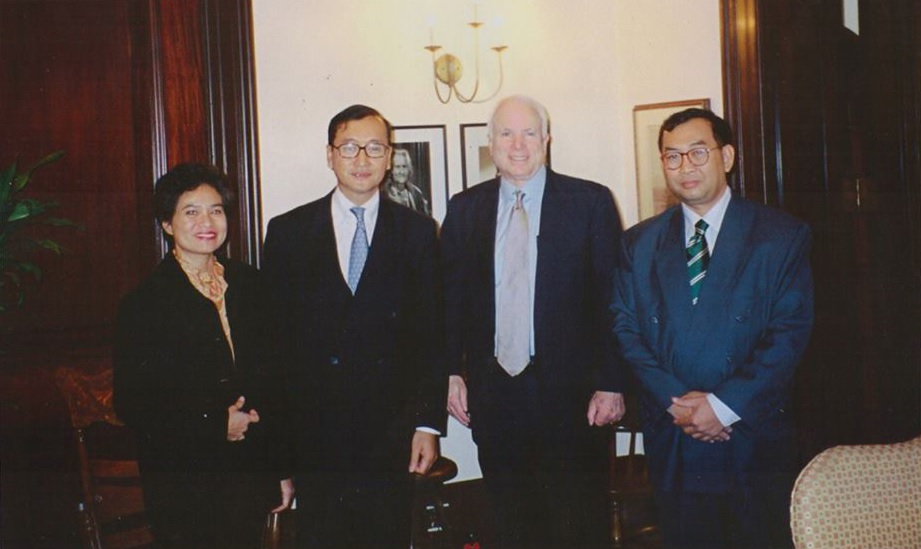
Rainsy and his wife Tioulong Saumura meet with then U.S. senator John McCain

Sam Rainsy's father, Sam Sary, had served as a minister in the education, planning and finance portfolios before becoming a Deputy Prime Minister in Sihanouk's government in the 1950s. Sam Rainsy's mother, In Em, was said to be the first Cambodian woman to have completed the Baccalauréat exam. Sam Sary fled the country in 1959 when Sam Rainsy was ten for suspected involvement in the Bangkok Plot, while his mother was thrown into prison. Sam Rainsy's grandfather, Sam Nhean had served as the President of the Royal Council of Cambodia and was a prominent member of the Democratic Party in the 1940s. Sam Nhean later founded the People's Party.

Sam Rainsy is married to Tioulong Saumura (since 1971), who is also member of parliament for his current party, and has three children: Patrice Sam, Muriel Sam and Rachel Sam. Tioulong Samura's father, Nhiek Tioulong, was a military general who founded the Khmer Renovation party and briefly served as Prime Minister in 1962. His mother-in-law, former First Lady Measketh Samphotre, died in November 2016, aged 96, but neither was able to attend the latter's funeral at Wat Svay Pope. Both Sam Rainsy and his wife claim to have Chinese ancestry, the former having revealed that one of his great-great grandfathers was a Chinese immigrant, while Nhiek Tioulong revealed that he had a Chinese grandfather during a dialogue session with Zhou Enlai in 1954. Rainsy maintains a home in Paris' 15th arrondissement.

=== University degrees ===
- Economics (Institut d'études politiques de Paris)
- Business Administration (Master of Business Administration from INSEAD - Fontainebleau - France) - 1980.
- Accounting (Diplôme d'études comptables supérieures issued by the French Ministry of Education) - 1979.
- Economics (Maîtrise + Diplôme d'études supérieures des Sciences économiques de la Faculté de droit et des sciences économiques de Paris - Panthéon-Assas) - 1973.
- Political Science (Diplôme de l'Institut d'études politiques de Paris) - 1971.

== Works ==
- We Didn't Start the Fire: My Struggle for Democracy in Cambodia. Chiang Mai: Silkworm Books. 2013.

== Bibliography ==
- Brown, MacAlister Brown; Zasloff, Joseph Jermiah; Cambodia Confounds the Peacemakers, 1979-1998, Cornell University Press, 1998, ISBN 0801435366

New office	Minority Leader; 2015	Succeeded by Kem Sokha
New office	Minister of Economy and Finance; 1993–1994	Succeeded by Keat Chhon
Party political offices
New office	President of the Cambodia National Rescue Party; 2012–2017	Succeeded by Kem Sokha
New office	President of the Sam Rainsy Party; 1995–2012	Succeeded by Kong Korm
Diplomatic posts
Preceded by Rajiva Wijesinha	Chair of the Council of Asian Liberals and Democrats; 2012–2014	Succeeded by Oyun Sanjaasuren
