= Ny Nak =

Cambodian human rights activist

Ny Nak (Khmer: នី ណាក់; born c. 1979) is a Cambodian agriculturalist and human rights activist. Known for running the popular Facebook group IMan-KH, his frequent criticisms of the governments of Hun Sen and Hun Manet have led to his arrest on several occasions, as well as physical attacks. Nak served an 18-month custodial sentence for "public injury" between 2021 and 2023.

== Activism ==
Nak established the Facebook page IMan-KH, which has 424, 000 followers as of January 2024. He frequently posts social commentary on Cambodian society and politics.

=== December 2020 arrest and imprisonment ===
On 7 December 2020, Nak made a Facebook post in which he altered the wording of a speech given by the then-Prime Minister of Cambodia, Hun Sen, about the ongoing COVID-19 pandemic. In his post, Nak amended the wording of Sen's speech to include references to poultry, including that chickens should wear face masks.

Following Nak's post, Veng Sakhon, the then-Minister of Agriculture, Forestry and Fisheries, made an official complaint alleging that Nak's post was criticising the government's response to COVID-19, in addition to implying that there might be avian influenza on Cambodian chicken farms. On 9 December, Nak was arrested and charged with "incitement" and "public insult". Following his initial court appearance, Nak was sent to pre-trial detention at Prey Sar prison. In August 2021, he was sentenced to 18 months in prison and fined two million riels.

In June 2023, Nak was released from prison following the completion of his sentence, during which time he had issued a public apology to Sen.

==== Response ====
Political analyst Lao Mong Hay stated that Nak's post had been clearly humorous, and that comedic social commentary was not a breach of Cambodia's criminal code. The Cambodian Center for Human Rights described Nak's arrest as "alarming" and a violation of his right to free speech.

A spokesperson for the Ministry of Justice disagreed with public criticism of Nak's arrest, commenting that Nak had shown "ill-intention" in previous public comments he had made.

=== September 2023 attack ===
On 12 September 2023, Nak and his wife Synet were attacked with metal batons shortly after leaving their warehouse in Khan Chbar Ampov. After their motorcycle was hit by an unknown object, forcing it from the road, between four and eight men dressed in black attacked the couple. The attack occurred hours after Nak made a Facebook post criticising Dith Tina, the Minister of Agriculture, Forestry and Fisheries, over his handling of rice prices. Following the attack, Nak was hospitalised in a critical condition due to head and extremity injuries.

Nak subsequently stated his belief the attack was done under the order of government officials, citing posts he had made over the preceding weeks, including accusing the Ministry of Agriculture, Forestry and Fisheries of focusing on photo ops over improving the lives of farmers, and alleging that the ruling Cambodian People's Party had asked him to join the party and stop posting criticisms of the government.

No arrests have been made following the attack. It has been reported that the Phnom Penh Municipality Police have claimed the sun's reflection in security camera footage obscured the identity of the attackers.

==== Response ====
Human Rights Watch claimed there was a link between the attack on Nak and Synet and similar incidents that had occurred earlier in 2023 against members of the opposition Candlelight Party, which had subsequently been dissolved by the government. They also raised concerns that the attack indicated that government brutality against political dissidents under Hun Sen had continued under his successor, Hun Manet, calling on Manet to ensure there was a full investigation.

=== January 2024 arrest ===
In December 2023, Nak made several Facebook posts in which he questioned the Cambodian government's decision to donate 91 hectares of land in Kampot Province to an individual named Heng Sour. While Nak did not specify which Heng Sour the land transaction referred to, local media outlets reported it referred to the Minister of Labour with the same name. The government denied the allegations. The same month, Nak accused the Ministry of Commerce of lying when it stated that 10, 000 new companies had been established in Cambodia in 2023.

On 5 January 2024, Nak was arrested while riding a motorcycle in Phnom Penh, and appeared in court the following day, where he was sentenced to pre-trial detention on charges of "incitement to discriminate" and "defamation". The exact cause of Nak's arrest has been disputed, with the Cambodian League for the Promotion and Defense of Human Rights reporting it was due to his criticism and naming of Heng Sour, while Radio Free Asia reported it was linked to his criticism of the Ministry of Commerce.

On 8 January, Nak's wife Synet stated that he "regretted" his comments and wished to apologise to Hun Manet. On 13 January, she stated that Nak was now "weak" due to his ongoing imprisonment".

==== Response ====
Human Rights Watch released a statement in which they called on the Cambodian government to respect Nak's right to free expression by "immediately and unconditionally" releasing him.

== Personal life ==
Nak is a farmer who sells sausages and agricultural products. He lives in Phnom Penh with his wife, Sok Synet.
