= Climate change in Cambodia =

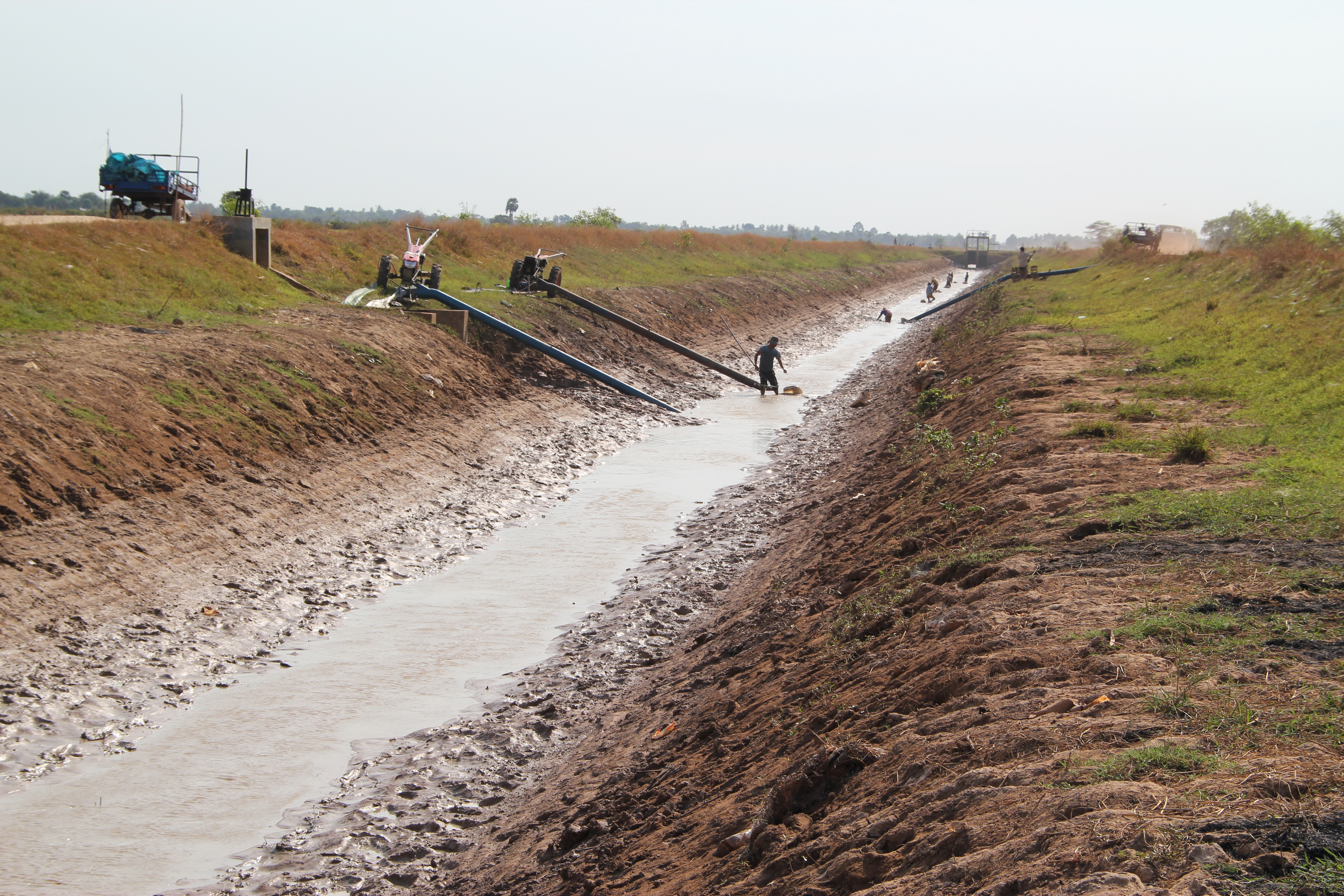
A dried river bank during a dry season in Cambodia. Climate change threatens the country's water resources.

Cambodia is highly vulnerable to the effects of climate change. Extreme weather events will occur more frequently; this includes floods, which already affect 90,000 residents annually, and heatwaves, with Cambodia already having one of the highest temperatures of the world. The temperature has increased since the 1960s by 0.18 °C per decade. It had the 7th lowest CO_{2} emissions in Asia in 2019.

Climate change is leading to increased drought in Cambodia, which is having major impacts on the Tonlé Sap and Mekong deltas. These water systems are highly important for water, agriculture and fishing in the country. Cambodia's population is impacted by increasing floods, tropical cyclones and waterborne diseases, and is highly vulnerable due to its high rate of poverty.

== Greenhouse gas emissions ==
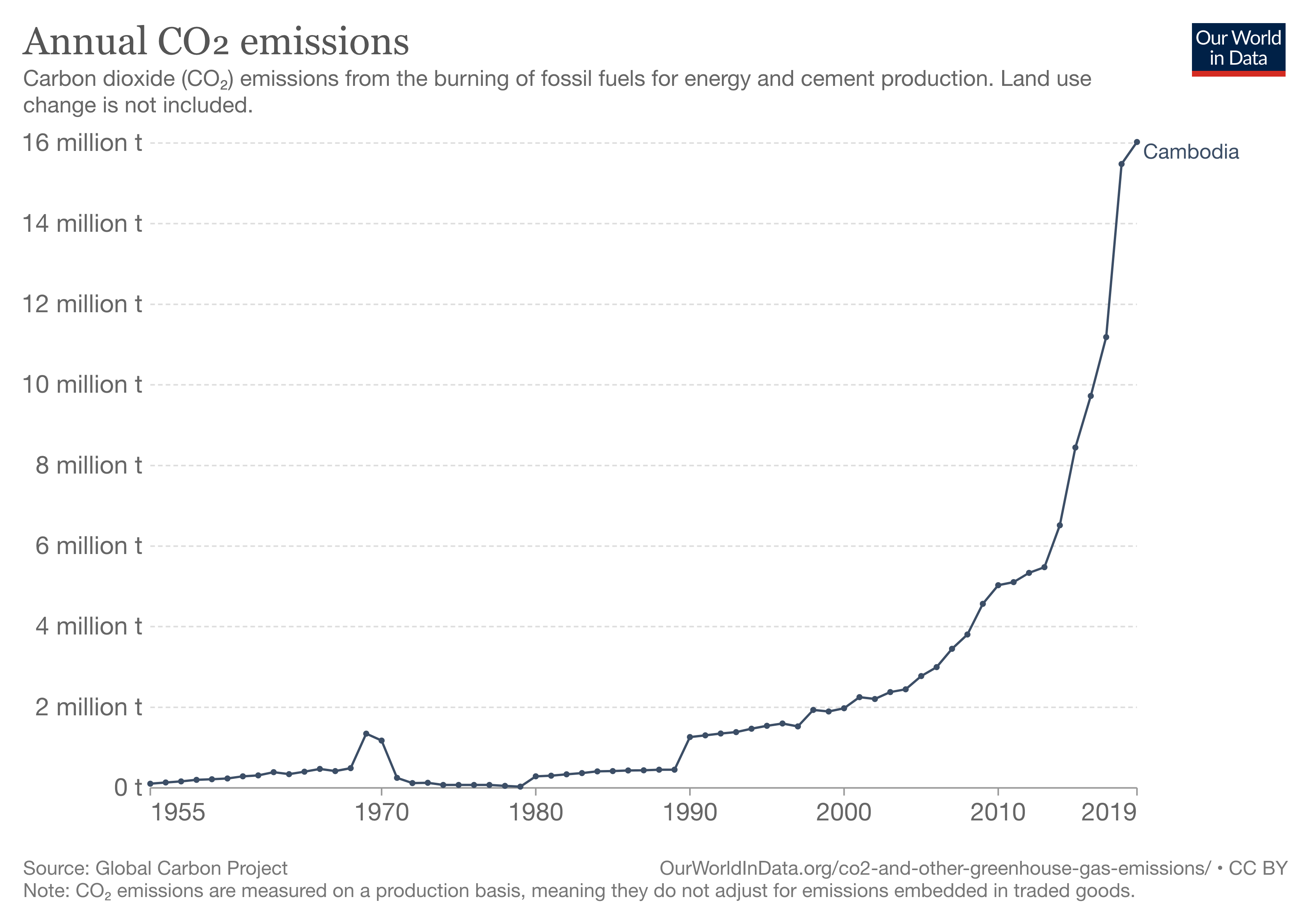
Annual CO_{2} emissions in Cambodia.

In 2020 Cambodia reported 15.33 mt in CO_{2} emissions and is responsible for 0.04% in 2019 and cumulatively 0.01% of worldwide CO_{2} emissions. The per capita CO_{2} emissions in 2019 were 0.97t since 2013 a big increase in CO_{2} emissions was observed with an increase of 192.69% between 2013 and 2019. 143.84 mt of CO_{2} emissions have been emitted between 1751 and 2019.

== Impacts on the natural environment ==
=== Temperature and weather changes ===
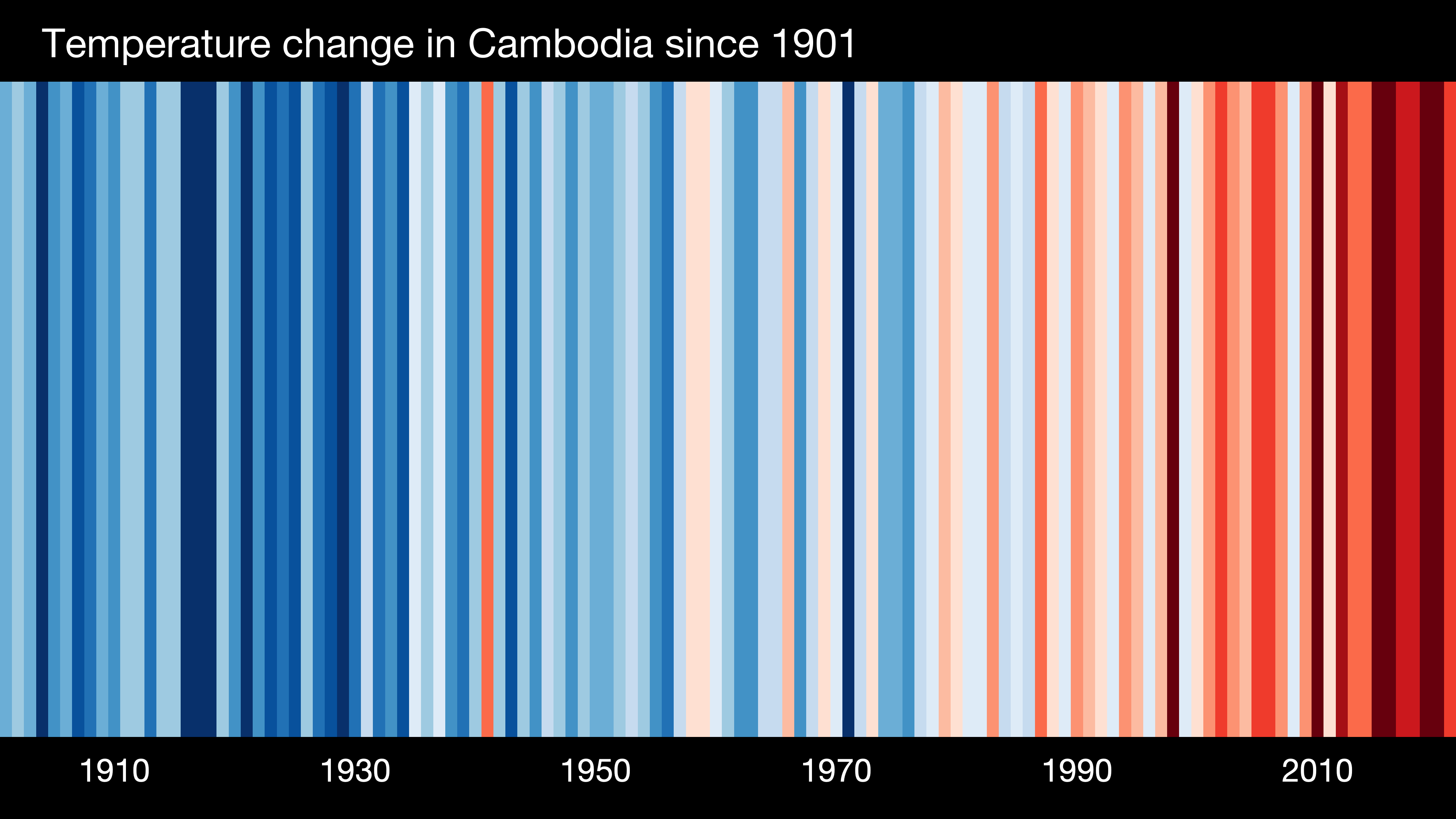
Warming stripes in Cambodia between 1901 and 2021.

The temperature has increased 0.18 °C per decade since 1980. Cambodia already has one of the highest temperatures in the world with 35 °C being recorded for 64 days a year nationally. These temperatures will rise in all RCP scenarios which could lead to permanent heat stress. The probability of droughts in 2080-2099 will rise from 4% annually to 5-9% under all scenarios.

Daily temperature increase in 2080-2099 compared to 1986-2005 temperatures
Climate change scenario	2080-2099
RCP 2.6 low emissions scenario	1.0 °C
RCP 4.5 intermediate scenario	1.8 °C
RCP 6.0 peak around 2080 then decline	2.2 °C
RCP 8.5 high emissions scenario	3.7 °C

The sub-daily precipitation will likely increase in intensity. Around 90.000 people are annually exposed to flooding in Cambodia, in RCP 8.5 scenario this will increase to 160.000 people annually. A study that was done by the World Bank expects that in 2050 19% of the population will be exposed to flooding.

=== Water ===
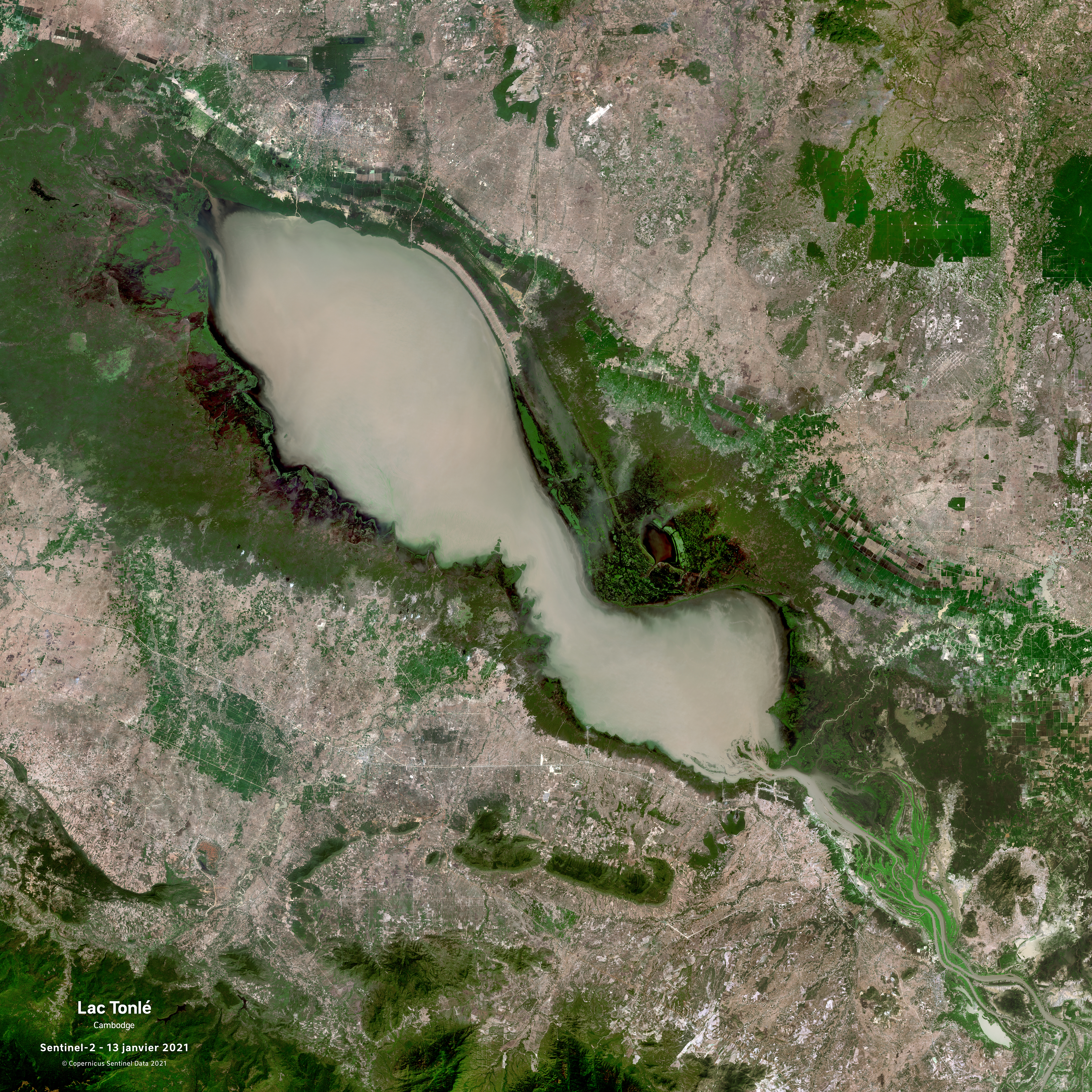
River flows of the Tonlé Sap are being impacted by climate change.

A major climate change issue for Cambodia is the impact it has on the Tonlé Sap lake and Mekong river system. Climate change will impact water flow in the country and increase the frequency of droughts. Hydropower dams have further exacerbated the issue.

== Impacts on people ==
Impacts on the Tonlé Sap lake and Mekong will have considerable implications for agriculture and fishing in the country. The Cambodian population, which has a high rate of poverty, is highly vulnerable to the impacts of climate change on tropical cyclones, floods and waterborne diseases.

UNICEF ranked Cambodia 46th out of 163 that they assessed on the impact of climate change on the youth. Cambodia was ranked as a high risk country in the report. The youth in Cambodia is already highly exposed to scarcity of water, riverine flooding and vector-borne disease which could worsen with the effects of climate change.

== Mitigation and adaptation ==
The Cambodian government pledges to reduce emissions by 41.7% in 2030.

== See also ==
- Tonlé Sap
- Climate change in Vietnam
- Climate change in Thailand
- Deforestation in Cambodia
