= COVID-19 pandemic in Cambodia =

- Disease: COVID-19
- Pathogen: SARS-CoV-2
- Location: Cambodia
- First outbreak: Wuhan, Hubei, China
- Index case: Sihanoukville
- Arrival date: 27 January 2020 (6 years, 6 months, 2 weeks and 2 days)
- Confirmed cases: 139,326 (Note: From 1 October 2021, Cambodia stopped testing asymptomatic cases, so the number of announced cases may not reflect the real situation.)
- Recovered: 135,677
- Deaths: 3,056
- Fatality rate: 2.19%

Government website
- Communicable Disease Control Department

The COVID-19 pandemic in Cambodia was a part of the ongoing worldwide pandemic of coronavirus disease 2019 (COVID-19) caused by severe acute respiratory syndrome coronavirus 2 (SARS-CoV-2). The first imported case in Cambodia was detected in Sihanoukville on 27 January 2020. Although a number of imported cases and transmission to direct contacts were confirmed throughout 2020, no community transmission was detected until 29 November 2020. As of July 2021, Phnom Penh has been the most affected province with the majority of infections and deaths. Banteay Meanchey has the second-highest number of infections, whereas Kandal has second-highest number of deaths.

The public health response is led by the Ministry of Health with support from the U.S. Centers for Disease Control and Prevention, World Health Organization and Institut Pasteur du Cambodge. Contact tracing, quarantining, screening of arrivals and public messaging related to hygiene, social distancing and mask wearing have been central to the containment strategy. According to Global Health Security Index's report in 2019, Cambodia ranked 89th out of 195 countries in preparedness for infectious disease outbreak.

Cambodia's initial response was slow - during the initial outbreak in China, few international travel restrictions were introduced, Cambodian citizens were not evacuated from Wuhan and Prime Minister Hun Sen downplayed the threat. Cambodia allowed passengers of cruise ship MS Westerdam to disembark in February after it was refused entry to other countries. Starting in March as the pandemic spread globally, Cambodia established its national response committee, introduced restrictions on arrival, closed education institutions, garment factories and entertainment venues, and major public holidays were cancelled. A controversial State of Emergency Law was passed in April 2020 but has not been implemented to date. Most restrictions within the country were lifted by September. In November, some restrictions were reinstated in Phnom Penh and thousands of Cambodian government employees and contacts went into quarantine following a one day-visit by Hungarian Foreign Minister Péter Szijjártó, who tested positive after arriving in Bangkok. On 29 November, the first community transmission cluster was detected in Phnom Penh, with the virus suspected to have entered the country sometime during October and circulated undetected. The country began its vaccination programme and detected its largest outbreak to date in February 2021 thought to be related to a Phnom Penh quarantine breach that led to outbreaks at nightlife venues. Cambodia reported its first death on 11 March 2021. As Lineage B.1.1.7 spread in the capital's markets and garment factories, a curfew was later strengthened to the country's first lockdown across the entirety of Phnom Penh and Takhmau in April 2021 as the WHO warned Cambodia's healthcare system was at risk of becoming overwhelmed. Provincial authorities later introduced restrictions elsewhere as outbreaks occurred.

Cambodia's response up to July 2020 and its welcoming of the MS Westerdam were praised by the World Health Organization. Criticism has included Prime Minister Hun Sen's downplaying of the risk of an outbreak during the early stages of the pandemic, persecution of critics and testing and surveillance procedures, particularly in overcrowded prisons. The pandemic has had a severe impact on the economy, notably the tourism and garment sectors, with projections of a lasting increase in poverty, debt and unemployment.

== Background ==
On 12 January 2020, the World Health Organization (WHO) confirmed that a novel coronavirus was the cause of a respiratory illness in a cluster of people in Wuhan City, Hubei province, China, which was reported to the WHO on 31 December 2019.

The case fatality ratio for COVID-19 has been much lower than SARS of 2003, but the transmission has been significantly greater, with a significant total death toll.

== Timeline ==
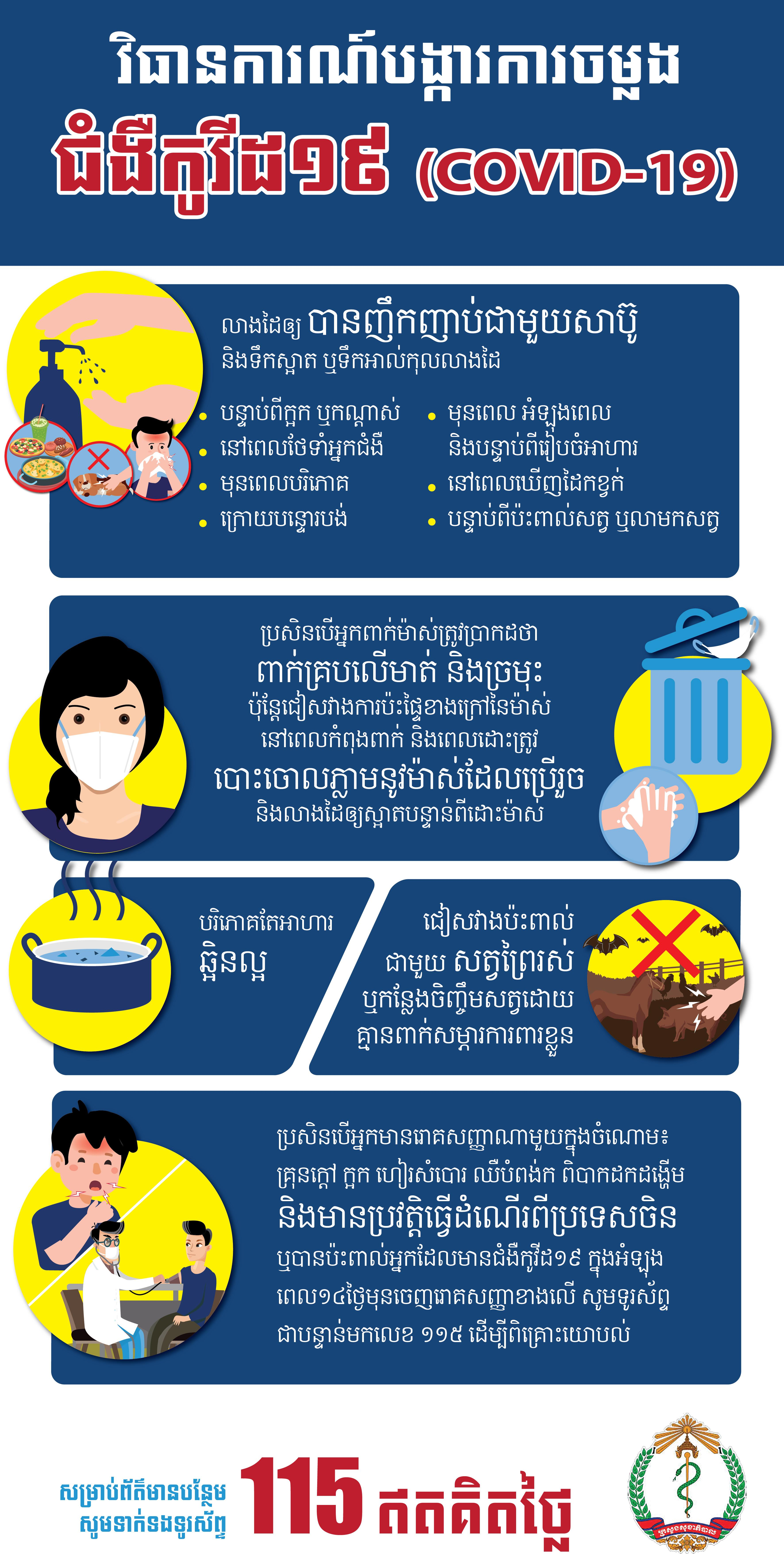
Preventive measures poster by Communicable Disease Control Department (CDCD)

=== January–February - first case and docking of MS Westerdam ===
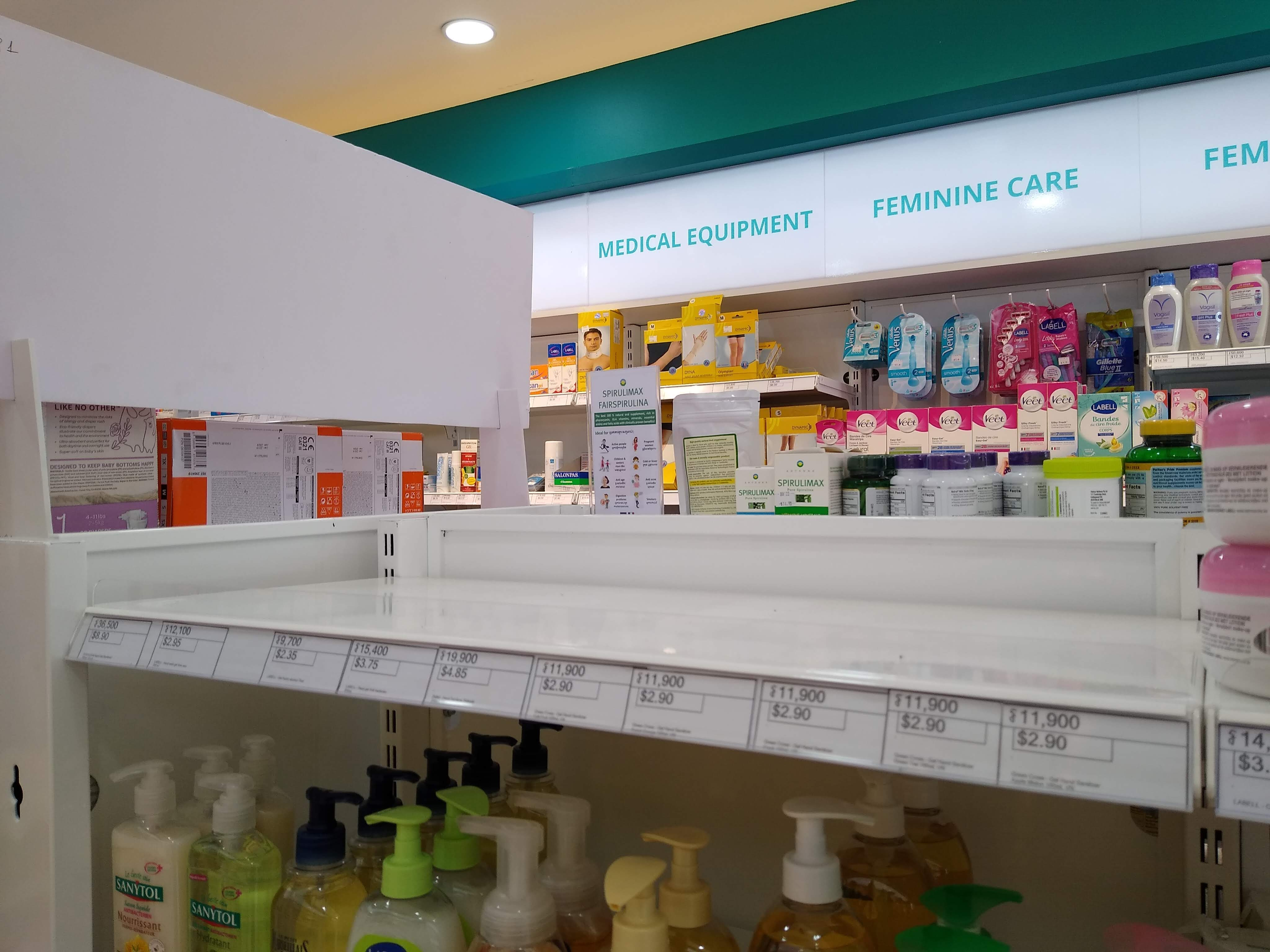
An empty hand sanitizer shelf in Kep on 28 January 2020, the day after the first case was confirmed in Cambodia

At 3 p.m. on 27 January, the first case had been confirmed in Sihanoukville on a 60-year-old Chinese man who arrived in 23 January from Wuhan, Hubei with his family. Three other members of his family were placed under quarantine as they did not appear to have symptoms, while he was placed in a separate room at the Preah Sihanouk Referral Hospital.

On 10 February, after two weeks of being treated and kept under observation, he had fully recovered, Health Ministry stated on account of testing negative for the third time by Pasteur Institute of Cambodia. The family were finally discharged and flew back to their home country on the next day as of the 80 Chinese nationals who arrived in Sihanoukville on the same flight as him, most have since returned to China, although the city of Wuhan remains under quarantine.

The cruise ship MS Westerdam was reportedly taking 1,455 passengers and 802 crew around Asia, 651 of whom were U.S. citizens. It was previously docked in Hong Kong, around the time it was badly hit by the virus. The Westerdam arrived in Sihanoukville on 13 February after it had been turned away by four countries due to virus concerns. About 20 passengers on board, who were unwell, took clinical tests but the vast majority had their temperature taken and filled out a form. Most of these passengers then disembarked. This move was praised by the World Health Organization (WHO), who called it an "example of international solidarity". No officials or passengers implemented social distancing or mask wearing during the ceremony, and passengers were later encouraged to tour around Phnom Penh.

Of 145 Westerdam passengers who stopped in Malaysia by plane on 15 February, an 83-year-old American woman tested positive for the virus, leading to concern that other passengers may also have been infected. By only then, the remaining of 781 passengers were isolated and taken clinical tests, and still, the Westerdam was criticized as it was not designed for quarantine and the passengers were able to socialize.

A comedian based in Oregon who was hired to perform on the Westerdam was said to have flouted the quarantine by sneaking a flight back to Seattle. However, he averred that the quarantine never took place and was cleared by US CDC on both ends.

Later tests on the American woman who had already returned home showed negative as she never had carried the virus after all, US CDC stated on 6 March. While the CDC had not tested the woman directly, it was confirmed that after the patient's initial positive result, two subsequent tests came back negative. It wasn't clear why she initially tested positive for COVID-19, though CDC officials have said she might have had other respiratory illness.

=== 1-15 March 2020 - imported cases ===
On 7 March, the second case of the coronavirus was detected in a 38-year-old man, a Cambodian in Siem Reap. He was among four people (three of the man's relatives and a Japanese woman) placed under quarantine at Siem Reap Provincial Referral Hospital, all of whom had direct contact with a Japanese man in his 40s who left Cambodia on 3 February and tested positive upon arrival in his country at Chubu Centrair International Airport in Tokoname, Aichi. Meanwhile, some 40 other people in the same city had been isolated under medical supervision since indirect contacts with the same Japanese man. The government prompted its decision to close all schools and cancelled the upcoming Songkran in the city.

On 10 March, the Ministry of Health confirmed the country's third case. At 4:30 p.m., a 65-year-old British woman had tested positive for the virus in Kampong Cham. She was a passenger of a cruise ship named Viking Cruise Journey, which travelled from Ho Chi Minh City to Kampong Cham City. The woman took a flight from London straight to Hanoi on 2 March then another flight to Ho Chi Minh City with four other people, all British. Arriving to Phnom Penh on 7 March via the cruise, it was reported that a Vietnamese woman, who was seated next to the group on the plane from London, had carried the virus. The group of five were taken samples for testing. Two of them refused, claiming that they were healthy and having no symptoms, until the cruise ship reached Kampong Cham on 9 March.

Following the event, the boat had been docked to provide samples to be tested from all 29 other passengers and 34 crew and they were placed under quarantine in a hotel somewhere in the city. The British patient was transferred to Royal Phnom Penh Hospital in Phnom Penh at her own request, adding that she had been conducted with coordination from WHO. On 12 March, another cases of two passengers of Viking Cruise Journey were publicly confirmed at noon to have tested positive in a British man, 73 and his wife, 69, bringing up to five the confirmed cases at the time. Due to their ages, the married couple were transferred to Khmer-Soviet Friendship Hospital in Phnom Penh.

On 13 March, health officials confirmed two cases in Phnom Penh at 8 p.m. sharp, tallying to seven in total. A 49-year-old Canadian and a 33-year-old Belgian were in quarantine in Khmer-Soviet Friendship Hospital. The authorities were trying to locate those who had contacts with the patients.

For the time being, another two visitors to Tuol Sleng Genocide Museum (A British and his friend, a Canadian woman who worked in China) were suspected to have the symptoms and admitted to the said hospital. The British man, however, made an escape but was found later in Kampot and hospitalized there. They were tested negative, assuming it was just a fever they had. Nevertheless, their self-monitoring was needed for any changes.

All cruise ships had since been prohibited to enter the country through K'am Samnar checkpoint and any other checkpoints.

=== 14–25 March - restrictions come into place ===
In 14 March, MOEYS published an article declaring that they would have to shut down all educational institutes in Phnom Penh until further notice, as did an NGO where the Belgian man had been working. On 16 March, it was announced the closure of all educational institutions would be expanded nationwide.

According to a Ministry of Health press release, Cambodia announced a ban on all entries from Italy, Germany, Spain, France and the United States, with all visas indefinitely suspended. This policy would be held for thirty days, effective on 17 March. Iran was added to the list of countries whose nationals were suspended entry to Cambodia the following day, making a total of six. This would take effect on 18 March.

On 15 March, an additional case of COVID-19 was confirmed in Phnom Penh at 5 p.m. sharp on a French man, 35. With his wife and his four-month-old baby, the family flew from Paris to Singapore on 13 March. Showing signs of fever, the authorities there took his samples for examination. To wait for the results, he wasn't allowed to go any further, however as a follow-up health checkup was presented, he was informed that he could carry on and the results would be available accordingly. The family were off, landed at Phnom Penh International Airport on the morning of 14 March. The same day, the test came back positive. As of 15 March, the man was admitted to Khmer-Soviet Friendship Hospital while his wife and child, were staying at home of a relative under medical supervision.

Contacts with the man were found in the plane he boarded, in total of 24 passengers (including him and his family), and another two transporters who drove them home, to be examined. At 9 p.m., a report of 4 more cases were publicized, tallied up to twelve at the end of the day. It included a 4-month-old child of the French patient, a Cambodian from France, and two Khmer Muslims, 35 and 39, who attended the Tablighi Jamaat mosque superspreader event near Kuala Lumpur, Malaysia on 29 February. The ten mosque event attendees arrived at Preah Vihear (except one, who arrived at Stung Treng) on 3 March and up to 14 March, Malaysia informed that it had found the infected from that gathering. Another 8 people were continually in testing.

Within the span of two days on 17 March, the total confirmed cases leapt to 33. At half past 9 a.m., 12 cases were publicly stated. 11 Khmer were found to be infected in various provinces. They were among 79 people returning from attending the Tablighi Jamaat mosque event in Malaysia. One case further referred to a Cambodian man who crossed the border from Thailand in Banteay Meanchey. At 9:00 p.m., nine more cases were included, six more attendees in Malaysia and three Malaysians out of a group of five. Two of the group were put under quarantine at a mosque in Kep.

The government mandated the extended closure to karaoke clubs and cinemas and forbid all religious gatherings and concerts.

On 18 March, four more cases were detected: two Malaysians in Kampot and two more tabligh attendees in Tboung Khmum.

In response to Vietnam's unilaterally shutting down borders with Cambodia without prior notice, the Ministry of Foreign Affairs announced to suspend all border crossings with Vietnam for a month-long period with the exception of diplomats and official passport holders. The measure would take effect on 20 March to avert inconvenience quarantine requirements for both nations.

It was reported that Thailand unilaterally closed Cambodian-Thai provincial border crossing, An Ses-Preah Vihear.

The government had established a national committee for combating the COVID-19, it had duties to set national policy and strategy related to the fight against the COVID-19 and control the impact of the virus on politics, economy, and society at national and international levels. The committee was obliged to direct the implementation of the strategic plan in preventing, containing and controlling the spread of the virus.

On 19 March, ten more cases were detected: two wives of the infected men, two more tabligh attendees, and six Malaysians.

On 20 March, the Ministry of Health announced an additional 4 confirmed cases: a Malaysian, and three Cambodians, one of whom was infected from an attendee from Malaysia and had no recent travel record overseas.

On 21 March, two more cases were confirmed at 9 p.m., a 67-year-old and an 80-year-old Frenchmen who arrived Sihanoukville as tourists on 18 March. 37 people suspected to have contacts with were put under quarantine.

On 22 March, having tested negative for a few times, a 65-year-old patient, British woman was reported that she fully recovered. She was said to be discharged later that day.

After bilateral meetings between Cambodia and Thailand was resulted in agreement upon closing all borders starting from 23 March for 14 days. An exception was made at Poipet-Aranyaprathet border crossing where only heavy-duty trucks were allowed under strict conditions.

At 10 p.m., more 29 people linked in the same tourist group of the cases confirmed the previous night, plus two Cambodian guides were detected of the virus. The tourist group arrived Cambodia on 11 March, visiting four provinces. As the tour ended in Sihanoukville on 18 March, the group had stayed in Independence Hotel and was scheduled to depart from Phnom Penh on 21 March.

On 23 March at 19:30, three new cases were recorded to include a mother of a 4-month-old child whom she and her infant had been placed under treatment at the Kantha Bopha Children's Hospital and other two Cambodians.

On 24 March, the Health Ministry registered four new cases, risen up to 91. A British couple and an American couple were passengers of Viking Cruise Journey where the rest of them, 24 people were cleared and would depart for home from Phnom Penh via charter flights the next day. It also added that four patients, two from Tboung Khmum and another two from Battambang, were all tested negative twice and ready to be discharged.

On 25 March, Cambodia recorded five new cases, two from the French tourist group and 3 Cambodians with no recent foreign travels.

Four more patients, three from Phnom Penh and one from Tboung Khmum, had made complete recovery for that day.

174 Chinese nationals had been quarantined in Svay Rieng upon their arrival from Phnom Penh by bus after two of them exhibited high temperatures.

=== 26–31 March ===
Reportedly around 40 thousand workers from Thailand had returned home. The local authorities were ordered to pay close attention and getting them informed on preventive measures and self-quarantine themselves for two weeks.

On 26–28 March, two Indonesians taking off from Thailand and a Cambodian family of four who went on a trip to France were added to confirmed cases.

On 29–31 March, six cases were added to the total of 109 at the month's end.

Eleven patients from Koh Kong, Banteay Meanchey, Phnom Penh, Kampong Chhnang, Battambang and Siem Reap was reported to have recovered from the disease.

On 28 March, The government mandated to impose travel restrictions to Cambodia, effective on 30 March. It stated that it would suspend visa exemption policy and issuance of tourist visa, e-visa and visa on arrival to all foreigners for a period of one month. Any foreign individual entering the country must obtain a prior visa from Cambodian missions abroad and provide a medical certificate, issued no more than 72 hours prior to arrival time and proof that he/she holds at least 50 thousand dollars for medical coverage.

The authorities had traced 340 people who had indirect contacts with infected French tourist group in Siem Reap.

On 30 March, all casinos were ordered to close temporarily starting from 1 April.

=== April 2020 - cancellation of Khmer New Year ===
Between 1 and 9 April, Cambodia counted 9 new cases, most notably on 9 April, a discharged patient was found to be relapsing two days after. Moreover, 48 patients reportedly had recovered, mostly in Sihanoukville, adding up to 68 in total.

To ensure the nation's food security during the outbreak, rice exports would be halted from 6 April.

A planned return of 150 Cambodian workers from Malaysia was turn down on 7 April by the government to tighten safety for its country.

Massage parlours and health spas were ordered nationwide to temporarily shut down from 7 April.

Khmer New Year celebrations scheduled 13–16 April were cancelled, implementing no-holiday policy to all employees and officials. The government promised to provide US$70 a month to any laid-off worker whose factories were suspended operations. For those who go on holidays would have to take quarantine for two weeks without pay when they return to work.

An act was issued on 8 April to prohibit travels across provinces and between districts outside the capital with exceptions for goods transporters, armed forces and civil servants starting midnight on the 10th and would last a week until 16th.

=== May–October 2020 - slowdown in new case detections and reopenings ===
After a month-long streak of no new cases in May, the Ministry of Health reported a new imported case of a man travelling from the Philippines. The other 62 passengers on the flight were quarantined at a hotel in Phnom Penh.

In July, a small number of private schools were allowed to reopen for in-person teaching, with a number of safety protocols mandated.

Schools nationwide were reopened for in-person teaching on 7 September after a six-month closure. Temperature checks, mask wearing, hygiene and maximum number of occupants per room were mandated by authorities. Casinos began reopening in late September.

The annual Bon Om Touk (Water Festival) race in Phnom Penh was cancelled in October to minimise the risk of large gatherings.

=== November visit of Hungarian foreign minister ===
On 3 November, foreign minister of Hungary Péter Szijjártó visited Cambodia, holding meetings with high ranking government officials and signing three agreements. Szijjártó tested positive upon his return to Bangkok the following day, prompting staff from 13 government institutions, including Prime Minister Hun Sen, to go into quarantine. As of 11 November, the Ministry of Health had tested over 1,000 contacts and had started contact tracing efforts into seven provinces, with four contacts testing positive. Schools, museums, entertainment venues, cinemas, beer gardens and gyms in Phnom Penh and Kandal were closed for two weeks and the public were advised to avoid large gatherings such as weddings, group dinners and concerts.

Hun Sen dismissed rumors that a lockdown was being considered on 12 November. International arrival procedures were also changed, mandating a strict 14-day quarantine for all arrivals regardless of a negative test.

Restrictions related to the '3 November event' were lifted on 21 November.

=== First local transmission ===
On 29 November, Cambodia reported its first known local community transmission on a woman in Phnom Penh with no history of overseas travel. All six of her family members, including her husband who is the Director General of the General Department of Prisons, also tested positive. AEON Mall in Phnom Penh was closed as the woman had recently visited there, and contact tracing efforts began across the city and to three other provinces. As of 30, 3 November 382 people have been tested as part of this cluster and as of 5 December 29 people had tested positive. The government also cancelled the remainder of the 2020 school year.

The Ministry of Health later clarified that the strain of the community outbreak was different from the 3 November case, and suggested that COVID-19 may have entered the country sometime during October and been circulating in the population since then. The cluster was traced back to the daughter of the prison director, who showed symptoms in October, and may have had contact with an imported case.

=== February - April 2021: large-scale outbreak and vaccinations ===
Ministry of Health announced on 4 February that it had granted emergency use authorization to the Sinopharm BIBP vaccine. A million doses would be provided with first batch of 600 thousand doses received on 7 February. Among those whom to be prioritized for vaccination were government officials, armed forces, health workers, educators, and journalists. With a budget of $170 million, Cambodia thus began its vaccination programme on 10 February. Another batch of 700 thousand doses would be delivered on 1 April.

The government later rolled out the Covishield vaccine on 5 March with the first batch of 324 thousand doses. People above 60 were urged to receive this vaccine, otherwise, the Sinopharm vaccine was still for younger ones.

1.5 million purchased doses of Chinese-made CoronaVac were readied to deploy for registered 60-year-olds and under on 1 April.

A large-scale outbreak detected in Phnom Penh in 20 February took place when two out of four Chinese nationals who breached quarantine at the Sokha Hotel a few days prior tested positive. They were said to have spent time in a nightclub and several other residences including those in Koh Pich. This was the largest detected community outbreak to date, and selected city districts and businesses were ordered to close. An investigation by Al Jazeera English indicated after the quarantined persons had bribed security guards to be released, Phnom Penh's casino sector and human trafficking may have contributed to the outbreak. Hospitals in Phnom Penh reached capacity by 23 February. Later patients would be sent to Phnom Penh Quarantine Center in Prek Pnov District. One of the patients treated in the said facility was pronounced deceased around 9 a.m. A 34-year-old Chinese man's death was ruled as a heart attack due to Amphetamine withdrawal. Showing no mild symptoms, he was tested positive three days prior, a part of 20 February cluster with sum of 424 active cases so far that day.

On 11 March, a Cambodian man, 50, died at 10:40 a.m. from chronic lung disease in Phnom Penh. He was confirmed to be exposed to his employer on 28 February. This occurrence marked the country's first death of COVID-19.

According to U.S. CDC, all cases sequenced in the outbreak was infected by Lineage B.1.1.7 first identified in the United Kingdom and was believed to have started from an infected airline passenger who left quarantine without authorization on the night of 8 February.

An 8-to-5 night curfew order was implemented for two weeks started on 1 April across Phnom Penh. All non-essential travel and business activity was ceased. The death toll raised to 16.

In April 2021, a mass vaccination of Cambodia's textile workers began, with the view to help jump-start the country's post-pandemic economic recovery; the textile industry is worth an estimated $7 billion to Cambodia's economy.

A record daily figure of 576 infections were reported on 9 April. 544 of these were in Phnom Penh, mostly associated with cluster outbreaks at O'Russei market and a garment factory in Meanchey district. Some districts of Phnom Penh were placed under lockdown for 14 days, the first to be implemented in Cambodia since the pandemic began. Further restrictions were imposed including a ban on sales of alcohol and limiting restaurants' service to takeaway only. The virus had been circulating in 27 of Phnom Penh's crowded markets and at least 120 factories since the 20 February cluster was detected.

=== April–August 2021: city-wide lockdowns ===
On 6 April, home treatment for patients showing mild or no symptoms were introduced in Phnom Penh.

On 15 April, all of Phnom Penh and Ta Khmau were placed under lockdown, a strict stay at home order, for two weeks. Prime Minister Hun Sen warned the country was on the "brink of death", and the World Health Organization warned the country was "on the brink of national tragedy" with the healthcare system at risk of becoming overwhelmed. Prison sentences, fines and caning were used by police to enforce restrictions. Certain districts were declared as "red zones", where food markets and supermarkets were closed and people cannot leave except for medical emergencies, with the Ministry of Commerce in charge of distributing food supplies. The lockdown resulted in thousands of Phnom Penh residents going hungry and requiring emergency food aid.

Sihanoukville enacted another lockdown and several "red zones" on 24 April.

In Phnom Penh, "high-risk" business activities were restricted on 2 June.

In June, curfews were introduced in Siem Reap and Poipet, and a lockdown was announced in three locations of Samraong in Oddar Meanchey Province in response to wider outbreaks throughout the country's provinces.

By 12 June, Or Vandine announced that 2.3 million people had been fully vaccinated. The Interior Ministry announced in June that 10-20% of prisoners in certain prisons, representing several thousand people, had been infected by COVID-19.

By 16 June, It is reported that 3,076,775 people (1,494,797 females) have been vaccinated in Cambodia.

On 18 July, Cambodia suspended border crossing with Vietnam for one month with exceptions made only for diplomats, civil servants, some students and patients in need of medical treatment.

Provinces that border Thailand (Banteay Meanchey, Oddar Meanchey, Battambang, Pailin, Pursat, Koh Kong, Preah Vihear) and Siem Reap were put into lockdown for 14 days to combat Delta variant transmission in community, starting from 29 July. As of the date, 114 cases were detected since 31 March. Most were reported on migrants crossing from Thailand. During the first semester of 2021, more than 60 thousand people had returned from the neighboring country. Additionally 9pm to 3am curfew and restrictions were imposed nationwide.

A vaccination programme for 2 million people aged 12–17 would be run on 1 August, first in Phnom Penh, then Kandal, Sihanoukville and Koh Kong.

By 28 July, 70.43% of the targeted population were vaccinated. It would take less than three more weeks to reach the planned target.

In August, Prime Minister had confirmed that AstraZeneca vaccine would be administered as third dose, designated to frontliners and people in areas bordering Thailand. He also announced deployment of Janssen vaccine on 2 August to highland and rural areas. Tboung Khmum was distributed 98,485 doses for the opening campaign.

On 1 August, MoH confirmed 109 new cases of Delta variant which 5 cases were detected in Phnom Penh.

=== November 2021-present full reopening ===
On 1 November, Prime Minister Hun Sen announced that the country would be fully reopening all sectors, saying that the country had achieved herd immunity by vaccinating majority of its entire population. To expedite the reopening effort and promote tourism recovery, Hun Sen also ordered a removal of quarantine requirement for fully vaccinated travelers entering Cambodia by land, air or water, whether Cambodians or foreigners starting from 15 November. However, they still need to present a COVID-19 free certificate issued within 72 hours before travelling and to take a COVID-19 rapid antigen tests upon arrival.

== Impact ==
United Nations Development Programme predicted in October 2020 that the poverty rate in Cambodia could double to 17.6% and unemployment could rise to 4.8% as a result of the COVID-19 recession. The economy is projected to shrink by 5.5% in 2020, following 7% growth in 2019.

According to Asian Development Bank, around 390,000 people were estimated to have lost their jobs. Closure of garment factories alone, Cambodia's biggest employer, have left at least 100,000 people unemployed. Many Cambodians are indebted to microfinance institutions, putting them at risk of falling into poverty if loan repayments cannot be met. Around 86,000 Cambodian migrant workers returned from Thailand as border closures took effect, with minimal employment opportunities upon their return.

The pandemic severely impacted the tourism sector in Cambodia as international travel was disrupted by restrictions and all tourist visas were suspended. The coastal tourism hub of Sihanoukville was impacted by a drop in arrivals from China. In Siem Reap, ticket sales for Angkor National Park dropped to an average of 22 people per day during April, leaving Angkor Wat, typically bustling with thousands of tourists, almost empty. In October, ticket sales for Angkor were down 98% from sales in October 2019. Cambodian Cultural Village permanently closed. At least 600 hotels nationwide have closed, and more than 10,000 tourism sector employees have become unemployed.

Over 3 million children were affected by school closures. UNICEF stressed that adjusting to online learning disadvantages rural poor children in Cambodia, and the disruptions to education during the pandemic could have a long-lasting impact.

Lockdown restrictions and enforcement in April 2021 caused disruptions to Phnom Penh food supplies and led to tens of thousands of requests for food aid across the city.

=== Resurgence of ting mong ===
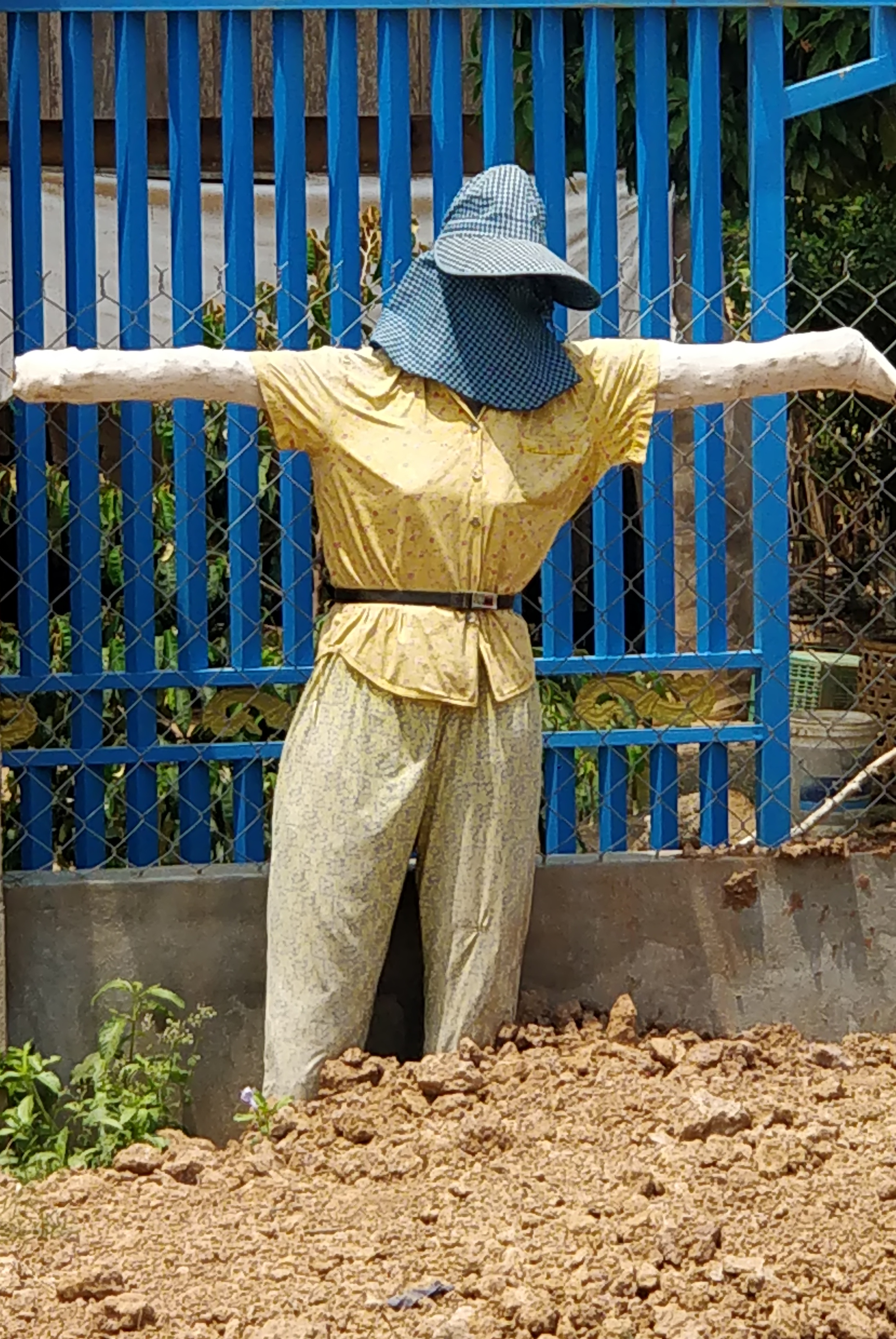
A ting mong in 2020.

The COVID-19 pandemic in Cambodia revived the traditional ting mong, a Khmer scarecrow hung on the outer walls of private houses or at the entry of the villages as an apotropaic popular belief. This curious practise against the spread of the coronavirus gained international attention.

== Humanitarian assistance ==
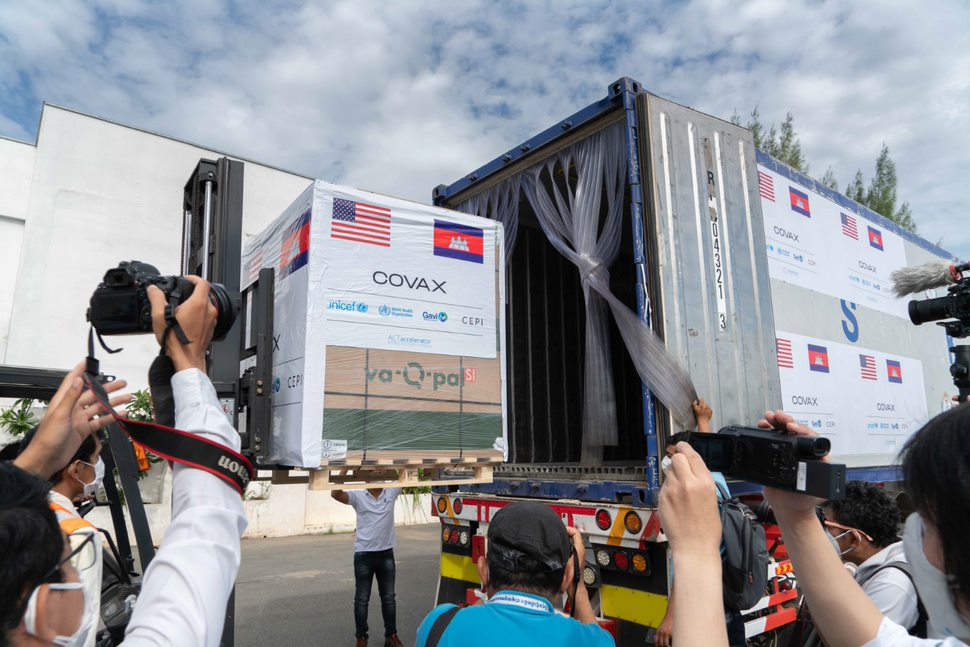
The US delivers Janssen COVID-19 vaccines to Cambodia as part of the COVAX program in 2021

China provided major assistance to the Hun Sen government's vaccination campaign. As of early November 2021, China had sent more than 35 million vaccines to Cambodia. China provided many of them free of charge. Vaccines provided by China accounted for more than 90% of total vaccines provided to Cambodia from other countries. China also provided other health care supplies as well as medical professionals to Cambodia during the pandemic. In part thanks to Chinese contributions, Cambodia had the second-highest vaccination rate in Southeast Asia, despite having the second lowest per capita GDP in the region.

On 23 March 2020, a team of seven specialist physicians from southern China's Guangxi with medical supplies, including ventilators, medical masks, protective suits, test kits, and infrared temperature sensors, had landed in Phnom Penh to assist tackling the pandemic.

In April 2020 and 2021, Vietnam donated US$500 thousand worth of medical supplies to Cambodia along with 800 ventilators, 2 million medical masks and 300,000 N95 masks. Vietnam's PM told Hun Sen that Hanoi is always ready to assist Cambodia in preventing the pandemic. This is one of the biggest aid from Vietnam to another countries in prevention against COVID-19. In July 2021, Cambodia had provided back to severely-plagued Vietnam US$350 thousand worth of medical equipment and financial aid.

On 21 May 2021, Cambodia received 528 packs of Cycloferon tablets and 520 packs of Cycloferon ampoules providing from Russia.

Cambodia had donated millions of face masks and PPE to Laos, Myanmar, East Timor and Nepal.

On 24 December 2020, the Australian government pledged to assist Cambodia with the acquisition and distribution of COVID-19 vaccines. The support will include procurement, delivery and health advice. The announcement was made following a meeting between Australian ambassador to Cambodia, Pablo Kang and the Cambodian Minister of Economy and Finance, Aun Pornmoniroth in Phnom Penh on 23 December.

Through the Vaccine Maitri initiative, Cambodia would receive 1 million Covishield vaccine doses from India in March 2021. Up to date, 324,000 doses had been arrived.

On 1 April 2021, Japan aided the country US$1 million through UNICEF for boosting process of vaccination programme. Japan also donated 1 million doses of Oxford-AstraZeneca vaccine with first batch of 332,000 doses delivered on 23 July 2021.

US distributed 1.06 million doses of Johnson & Johnson vaccine to the country through COVAX initiative in July 2021. The first batch of 450,500 doses arrived on 30 July.

United Kingdom announced 415,000 doses of AstraZeneca vaccine donation to Cambodia, expecting to arrive in August 2021.

== Reception ==
=== Initial response ===
During the early stages of the pandemic, it was reported that Prime Minister Hun Sen was downplaying the pandemic and Cambodia was not responding in an effort to maintain its close diplomatic and economic relationship with China. In February, Hun Sen downplayed the risk of the virus at a press conference, suggesting the virus was sensationalized by the media and threatened to expel those present who were wearing masks. Hun Sen also visited China to show Cambodia's support in its response, and offered to visit Wuhan specifically. Unlike most other countries, Cambodia did not cease travel to and from China and did not evacuate its overseas citizens from Wuhan during the initial outbreak there.

During a press conference on 27 July 2020, at the six month mark of the declaration of a Public Health Emergency of International Concern, World Health Organization Director-General Tedros Adhanom praised Cambodia for its success in "preventing [a] large scale outbreak", along with New Zealand, Rwanda, Vietnam and Thailand. The WHO also praised Cambodia's welcoming of the MS Westerdam.

=== Testing procedures ===
Concerns have been raised about the lack of widespread community testing in Cambodia. In April 2020, testing was reportedly restricted to travellers or those with contact to known COVID-19 cases. "Regular flu" cases were not being tested. The lack of transparency of these procedures was highlighted in the wake of the Hungarian Foreign Minister's visit in November, as were the breach in safety protocols during the meetings. A number of people travelling from Cambodia have tested positive for COVID-19 upon arrival in other countries. Some experts suggested that COVID-19 was circulating undetected in the country during 2020 while others suggested that the hot weather and open-air society kept transmission low.

=== Prisons ===
No prisoners were tested for COVID-19 despite coming into contact with officials who tested positive, prompting criticism from the Cambodian League for the Promotion and Defense of Human Rights, particularly as Cambodia's prisons are often overcrowded. Prisons director Nuth Savna told VOD in December that several prisoners had fever but still did not test them, dismissing this as due to the change in weather. In June 2021, the Interior Ministry's Prisons Department admitted that 10-20% of prison inmates in certain prisons had been infected with COVID-19, indicating several thousand infections were initially not tested or reported.

=== Human rights ===
On 30 March 2020, Human Rights Watch criticized local authorities for engaging in "inflammatory rhetoric against vulnerable groups and foreigners", including having specifically referred to groups (such as Khmer Islam) as the subject of positive cases in a 17 March Facebook post (which incited discriminatory comments), and having blamed foreigners for its spread. It has also criticized the Cambodian government for using emergency measures to restrict freedoms, including "baseless" arrests of critics and opposition supporters for "incitement" or dissemination of "fake news", including members of the Cambodian National Rescue Party, and an online journalist who quoted a speech by Prime Minister Hun Sen on social media.

In April 2021, Phnom Penh police were criticised by Cambodian human rights groups and Minister of Information Khieu Kanharith for implementing caning to punish violators of the city's lockdown restrictions. Human rights groups, and a group of UN special rapporteurs for human rights also expressed concern over the severity of punishments for lockdown violations.

=== Domestic public ===
In a study conducted by ISEAS, more than 80% of Cambodian respondents approved of the government's pandemic response.

Writing in 2024, academic Enze Han states that Cambodia's success during the pandemic significantly bolstered the perceived legitimacy and effectiveness of the Hun Sen government in the view of the Cambodian public.

== Notable deaths ==
- Sderng Chea, retired pediatrician
- Chean Bunthoeun, disk jockey
- Mao Ayuth, filmmaker and politician
- Richard Kiri Kim, former leader of Cambodian Freedom Fighters
- Uch Hean, councillor of Peam Chor, Prey Veng
- Long Sam'oeun, deputy commissioner of Preah Vihear
- Thak Khamtan, councillor of Stung Treng
- Pring Sakhorn, professor of RUPP
- Srey Bandaul, co-founder of NGO Phare Ponleu Selpak

== See also ==
- Health in Cambodia
- COVID-19 pandemic in Asia
