= Kampong Chhnang (National Assembly constituency) =

- Constituency for the National Assembly of Cambodia
- Province: Kampong Chhnang Province
- Population: 525,932

Current constituency
- Created: 1993
- Seats: 4
- Members: Kob Mariyas; Ouk Rabun; Tram Iv Tek; Kong Sam Ol

Kampong Chhnang (Khmer: ខេត្តកំពង់ឆ្នាំង) is one of the 25 constituencies of the National Assembly of Cambodia. It is allocated 4 seats in the National Assembly.

== MPs ==
Election	MP (Party)	MP (Party)	MP (Party)	MP (Party)
1993	Ouk Rabun (CPP)	Chhim Chhorn (FUNCINPEC)	Eam Ra (FUNCINPEC)	Kong Sam Ol (CPP)
1998	Nuon Sok (CPP)	Paing Punyamin (CPP)	Nan Sy (FUNCINPEC)	Kong Sam Ol (CPP)
2003	Ouk Rabun (CPP)	Tram Iv Tek (CPP)	Sok San (FUNCINPEC)	Kong Sam Ol (CPP)
2008	Keo Sosak (CPP)	Ker Chanmony (CPP)	Khy Vandeth (SRP)	Kong Sam Ol (CPP)
2013	Ke Chanmony (CPP)	Ky Vandara (CNRP)	Ngor Kimcheang (CNRP)	Kong Sam Ol (CPP)
2018	Kob Mariyas (CPP)	Ouk Rabun (CPP)	Tram Iv Tek (CPP)	Kong Sam Ol (CPP)
