= Ministry of Land Management, Urban Planning and Construction (Cambodia) =

Government ministry of Cambodia

- ក្រសួងរៀបចំដែនដី នគរូបនីយកម្ម និងសំណង់ Krâsuŏng Riĕbchâm Dêndei, Nôkôrubâniyôkâmm nĭng Sâmnáng
- Emblem

Agency overview
- Formed: 1999
- Jurisdiction: Royal Government of Cambodia
- Headquarters: 2005, Street 307, Phnom Penh; 11.6298°N 104.8714°E
- Annual budget: $915,000,000 (2019)
- Minister responsible: Say Sam Al, Minister of Land Management, Urban Planning and Construction
- Website: mlmupc.gov.kh

The Ministry of Land Management, Urban Planning and Construction (MLMUPC) is a government ministry of Cambodia. The Ministry is responsible for governing land use, urban planning, construction projects, and for the resolution of land use conflicts. The current Minister of Land Management, Urban Planning and Construction is Chea Sophara. and the Central offices of the ministry are located in Phnom Penh. In 2012, the ministry provided licenses to 1,694 construction projects, down 20% from 2,125 projects in a year earlier, but at a higher value.

== Land grabbing, illegal concessions and corruption ==
In the years of 2007-8 the Cambodian Government, was responsible for the sale of 45% of the total landmass in Cambodia to primarily foreign investors. Parts of these concessions are wildlife protections or national parks even (See Botum Sakor National Park for example), and the vast majority of the Economic Land Concessions (ELCs) have been issued in violation of Cambodia’s 2001 Land Law and its Subdecree on ELCs. The landsales has been perceived by observers, to be the result of land grabbing and corruption within the judicial system, ministries and government bureaucracy of Cambodia. The landsales are potentially threatening more than 150,000 Cambodians directly with eviction and affecting more than 400,000. Already thousands of citizens had fallen victims of forced evictions, stirring serious unrest across the country.

== Departments ==
The Ministry is currently organized into 6 administrative areas:

- Ministry - Offices of the Ministry cabinet and primary bureaux of the ministry.
- General Departments - Administration, human resources, budgeting, and so forth.
- Provincial and Municipal Departments - The Ministry maintains provincial department offices in each provincial capital
- Council of Land Policy
- National Cadastral Commission - Creates and maintains cadastral maps and works with Administrative Commission to resolve land ownership and land use conflicts.
- National Social Land Concession Committee

== Ministers ==
Portrait	Name	Tenure		Party
Portrait	Name	From	To	Party
	Im Chhun Lim	1999	5 April 2016	CPP
	Chea Sophara ជា សុផារ៉ា (b. 1953)	5 April 2016	Present	CPP

== See also ==
- Government of Cambodia
- Land use forecasting
