= Potato production in Cambodia =

Potato production in Cambodia has traditionally been negligible. With rising levels of potato consumption in Cambodia, the government has begun to encourage farmers to produce more potatoes. In September 2016, the first potato research center in Cambodia was opened.

== History ==
Potato production in Cambodia has been historically negligible, due to the fact that the plant was not found in Asia until imported from its native region of the Andes of South America in the 1700s. In a September 2016 speech delivered at the opening ceremony for the US$200,000 potato research center just outside the Royal University of Agriculture in Phnom Penh, Veng Sakhon, the Minister for Agriculture, underscored the increasing importance of potato production in Cambodia:

The demand for potatoes in the Kingdom is growing year-on-year, not only due to demand from foreign tourists, but also local people. As such, the potato market is growing remarkably.

It was the first potato research center built in Cambodia, with the collaboration from the Korean Project of International Agriculture, the Korean International Cooperation Agency and the Cambodian Ministry of Rural Development. In March 2017, after testing different potato varieties from countries including Peru, South Korea, and Germany, and identifying those suitable for the Cambodian climate, researchers from the center announced that Cambodia’s eastern Mondulkiri province would become Cambodia's first planting area for potatoes. They also projected that potatoes would eventually overtake rice as Cambodia's most important crop. The announcement was well-received by several restaurateurs who believed that the increased production of potatoes in Cambodia would drive down their overall costs. Additionally, the Sustainable Agrifood Systems (SAS) arm of ASEAN produced a Khmer potato-growing manual for local farmers.

== Cuisine ==
Potatoes are not an integral part of Cambodian cuisine, and "the prospect of mashed, baked, boiled or fried potatoes seems to have little traction with Cambodians"; even in rural areas, where rice is scarce, potatoes are not typically consumed. Potatoes in Cambodia are used more for snacking than as a staple food, and potato consumption is generally more common in urban areas where there are foreigners.

== See also ==
- Agriculture in Cambodia
