= Chuon Saodi =

Cambodian politician

Chuon Saodi is the former minister for agriculture of Cambodia.
