= Or Vandine =

Cambodian physician and politician

Chair of the National COVID-19 Vaccination Committee
- Incumbent
- Assumed office 17 March 2021
- Prime Minister: Hun Sen
- Preceded by: Position established

Secretary of State for the Ministry of Health

Personal details
- Party: Cambodian People's Party
- Education: Yale University (MPH)

Or Vandine is a Cambodian physician and politician currently serving as the Secretary of State and spokesperson for the Ministry of Health. She has been prominent in the COVID-19 pandemic in Cambodia as the Ministry of Health's spokesperson. In March 2021, she was appointed head of Cambodia's vaccination committee.

She is a Fulbright scholar and a graduate of Yale University in Master of Public Health.
