= Dith Munty =

Cambodian politician

His Excellency Dith Munty
- ឌិត មុន្ទី

President of the Supreme Court of Cambodia
- In office 5 June 1998 – 15 August 2023
- Appointed by: Supreme Council of the Magistracy
- Monarchs: Norodom Sihanouk; Norodom Sihamoni
- Preceded by: Chan Sok
- Succeeded by: Chiv Keng

Personal details
- Born: 15 November 1941 (age 83)
- Political party: Cambodian People's Party
- Children: Dith Tina

Dith Munty (Khmer: ឌិត មុន្ទី; born November 15, 1941) is a Cambodian politician and judge who served as the president of the Supreme Court of Cambodia from 1998 to 2023. He is a member of the Cambodian People's Party Permanent Committee.
