= Im Chhun Lim =

Cambodian politician; Member of National Assembly of Cambodia

Im Chhun Lim is a Cambodian politician. He belongs to the Cambodian People's Party and was elected to represent Kratié Province in the National Assembly of Cambodia in 2003, and serves as the country's Minister for Land Management, Urban Planning and Construction. Born in Kratie, Lim is of Chinese descent.
