= Dith Tina =

Cambodian politician and engineer

- ឌិត ទីណា
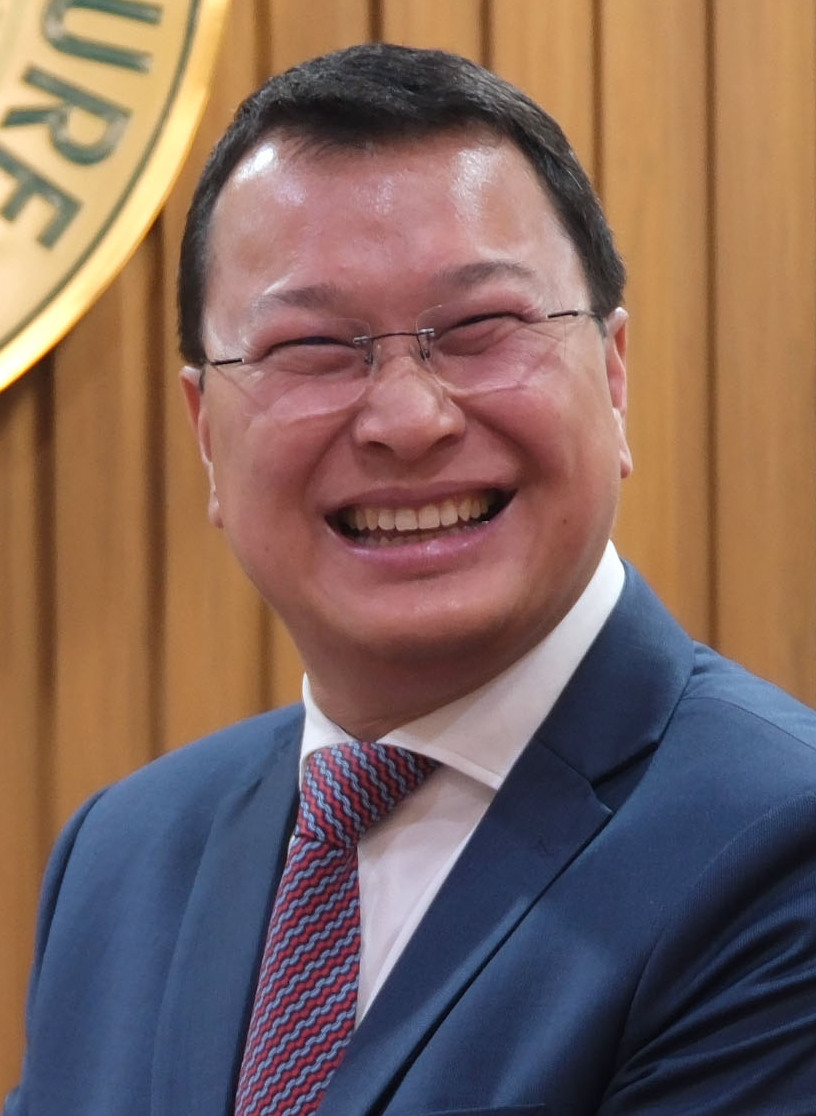
- Dith in 2025

Minister of Agriculture, Forestry and Fisheries
- Incumbent
- Assumed office 17 October 2022
- Prime Minister: Hun Sen; Hun Manet
- Preceded by: Veng Sakhon

Secretary of State for the Ministry of Mines and Energy
- In office 2014–2022

Personal details
- Born: 7 January 1979 (age 47) Phnom Penh, People's Republic of Kampuchea
- Party: Cambodian People's Party
- Relations: Dith Munty (father)
- Education: École nationale supérieure des mines de Paris; Paris-Sud University (MS)

Dith Tina (Khmer: ឌិត ទីណា; born 7 January 1979) is a Cambodian politician and engineer who currently serves as Minister of Agriculture, Forestry and Fisheries. He was the secretary of state for the Ministry of Mines and Energy from 2014 to 2022. He is the son of former Supreme Court president Dith Munty.
