= Prek Pnov district =

Prek Pnov district ខណ្ឌព្រែកព្នៅ
- District (Khan)
- Location of Prek Pnov District within Phnom Penh
- Coordinates: 11°39′33.0906″N 104°51′39.1026″E
- Country: Cambodia
- Province: Phnom Penh

Area
  - Total: 115.3 km^{2} (44.5 sq mi)

Population (2019)
  - Total: 188,190
- Time zone: UTC+7 (ICT)

Prek Pnov (Khmer: ខណ្ឌព្រែកព្នៅ) is a district (khan) located in the outskirts of Phnom Penh, Cambodia. It is the largest district by land area.

== Administration ==
Preaek Pnov is subdivided into 5 sangkats and 59 phums.

Commune (sangat)	Village (phum)
Ponhea Pon	Thum Tboung, Thum Cheung, Trapeang Snao, Boeng, Trapeang Pring, Srae Doun Touch, Prey Pongro, Veng
Prek Pnov	Duong, Pou Mongkol, Prek Pnov, Phsar Lech, Kandal
Samraong	Kruos, Samraong Cheung, Samraong Kandal, Samraong Tboung
Kouk Roka	Kab Srov Touch, Kab Srov Thum, Svay Chek, Baek Bak, Trapeang Veaeng, Trapeang Pou, Prey Thum, Putrea, Chres, Khmer Leu, Kouk Roka, Thlok, Chumrov, Andoung, Trapeang Sampoar, Ang Ta Kov, Phlu Ph'aem, Tuol Sampov
Ponsang	Buon Muk, Trapeang Ampil, Svay Oudam, Thnal Banteay, Trapeang Totoeng, Kantrong, Trapeang Roneam, Daeum Chan, Boeng Pech, Osphea, Ta Kol, Prey Svay, Kaoh Rongeang, Tuol, Tnaot Khpos, Boeng Khnam, Chong Thnal, Kanlaeng Kol, Chambak Thum, Trapeang Thlan, Trapeang Skon, Prey Snuol, Ta Skor, Tuol Ponsang
