= Agriculture in Cambodia =

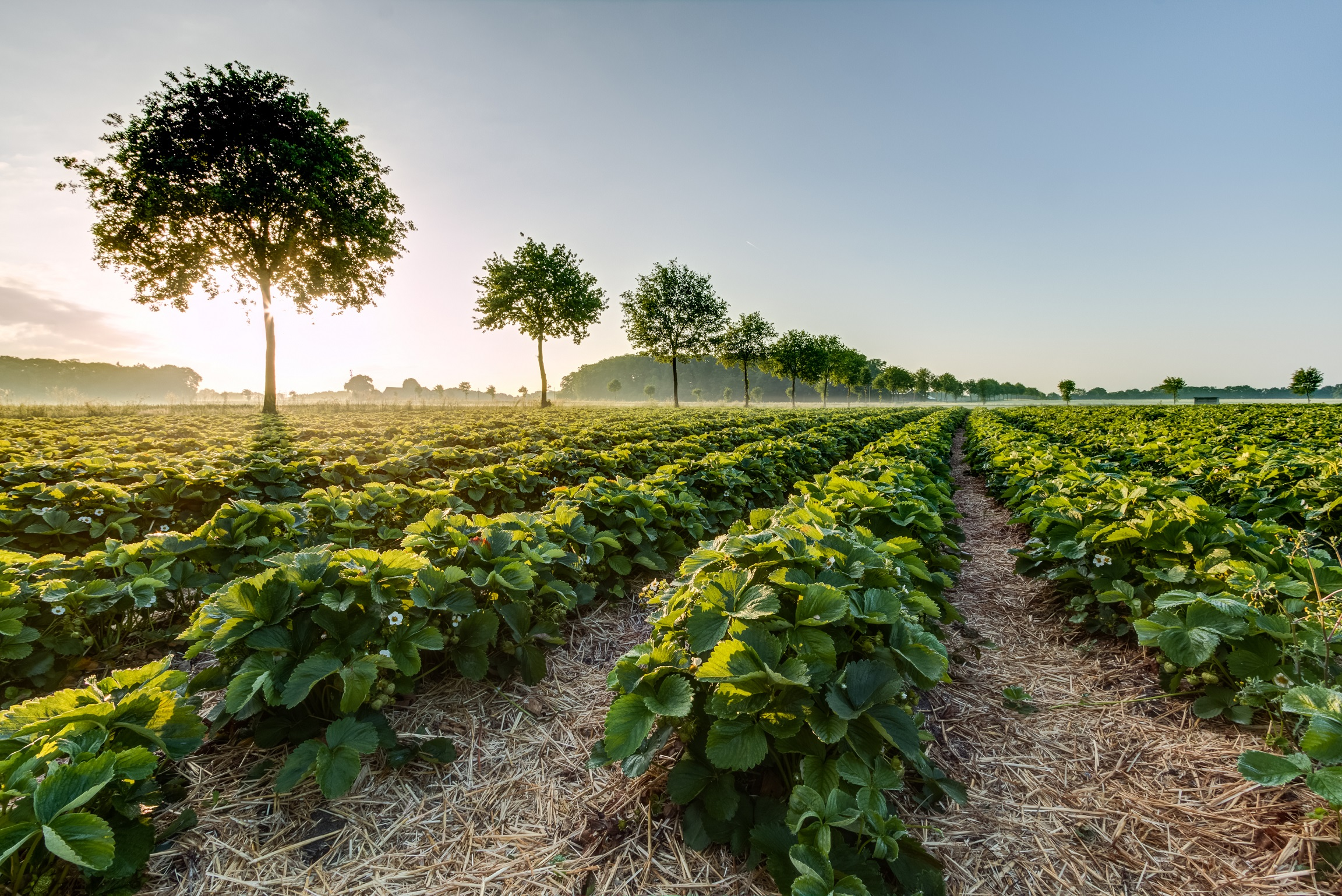
A farm in Kampot province

Agriculture accounts for 22 percent of Cambodia’s GDP, and employs about 3 million people.

== Agricultural history ==
Rice production, a vital economic indicator in Cambodia's agrarian society, frequently fell far short of targets, causing severe food shortages in 1979, 1981, 1984, and 1987.

The plan's 1987 target for the total area to be devoted to rice cultivation was 1.77 million hectares, but the actual area under cultivation in 1987 amounted to only 1.15 million hectares. After 1979 and through the late 1980s, the agricultural sector performed poorly. Adverse weather conditions, insufficient numbers of farm implements and of draft animals, inexperienced and incompetent personnel, security problems, and government collectivization policies all contributed to low productivity.

=== Collectivization and solidarity groups ===
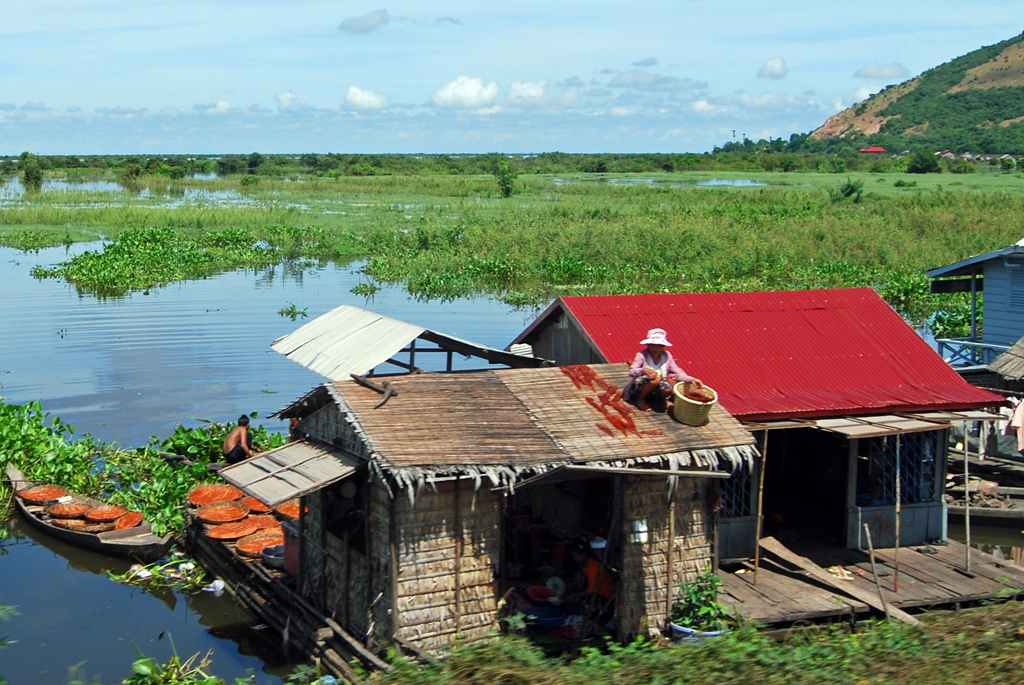
A fishing hut on the Tonle Sap

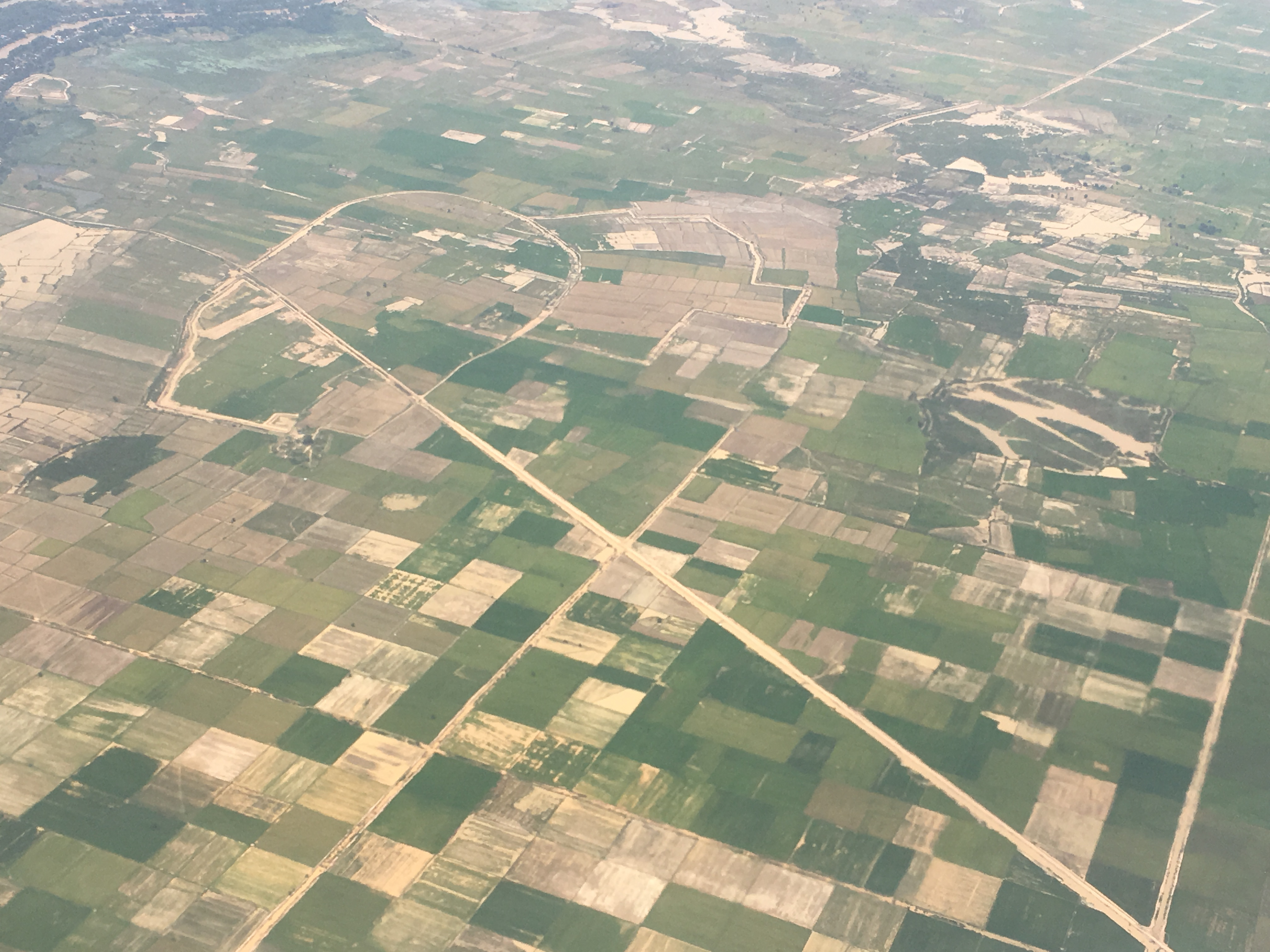
Agricultural fields in the Kampong Cham province, aerial

Collectivization of the agricultural sector under the Heng Samrin regime included the formation of solidarity groups. As small aggregates of people living in the same locality, known to one another, and able to a certain extent to profit collectively from their work, they were an improvement over the dehumanized, forced-labor camps and communal life of the Pol Pot era. The organization of individuals and families into solidarity groups also made sense in the environment of resource-poor, post-war Cambodia. People working together in this way were able to offset somewhat the shortages of manpower, draft animals, and farm implements.

In 1986, more than 97 percent of the rural population belonged to the country's more than 100,000 solidarity groups. Unlike the large communes of the Khmer Rouge, the solidarity groups were relatively small. They consisted initially of between twenty and fifty families and were later reduced to between seven and fifteen families. The groups were a form of "peasants' labor association," the members of which continued to be owners of the land and of the fruits of their labor. According to a Soviet analyst, the solidarity groups "organically united" three forms of property—the land, which remained state property; the collectively owned farm implements and the harvest; and the individual peasant's holding, each the private property of a peasant families.

In theory, each solidarity group received between ten and fifteen hectares of common land, depending upon the region and land availability. This land had to be cultivated collectively, and the harvest had to be divided among member families according to the amount of work each family had contributed as determined by a work point system. In dividing the harvest, allowance was made first for those who were unable to contribute their labor, like the elderly and the sick, as well as nurses, teachers, and administrators.

Some of the harvest was set aside as seed for the following season, and the rest was distributed to the workers. Those who performed heavy tasks and who consequently earned more work points received a greater share of the harvest than those who worked on light tasks. Women without husbands, however, received enough to live on even if they did little work and earned few work points. Work points also were awarded, beyond personal labor, to individuals or to families who tended group-owned livestock or who lent their own animals or tools for solidarity group use.

Each member family of a solidarity group was entitled to a private plot of between 1,500 and 2,000 square meters (depending upon the availability of land) in addition to land it held in common with other members. Individual shares of the group harvest and of the produce from private plots were the exclusive property of the producers, who were free to consume store, barter, or sell them.

The solidarity groups evolved into three categories, each distinct in its level of collectivization and in its provisions for land tenure. The first category represented the highest level of collective labor. Member families of each solidarity group in this category undertook all tasks from plowing to harvesting. Privately owned farm implements and draft animals continued to be individual personal property, and the owners received remuneration for making them available to the solidarity group during the planting and the harvesting seasons. Each group also had collectively owned farm implements, acquired through state subsidy.

The second category was described as "a transitional form from individual to collective form" at the KPRP National Conference in November 1984. This category of group was different from the first because it distributed land to member families at the beginning of the season according to family size. In this second category, group members worked collectively only on heavy tasks, such as plowing paddy fields and transplanting rice seedlings. Otherwise, each family was responsible for the cultivation of its own land allotment and continued to be owner of its farm implements and animals, which could be traded by private agreement among members.

Some groups owned a common pool of rice seeds, contributed by member families, and of farm implements, contributed by the state. The size of the pool indicated the level of the group's collectivization. The larger the pool, the greater the collective work. In groups that did not have a common pool of rice and tools, productive labor was directed primarily to meeting the family's needs, and the relationship between the agricultural producers and the market or state organizations was very weak.

The third category was classified as the family economy. As in the second category, the group allocated land to families at the beginning of the season, and farm implements continued to be their private property. In this third category, however, the family cultivated its own assigned lot, owned the entire harvest, and sold its surplus directly to state purchasing organizations. In the solidarity groups of this category, there was no collective effort, except in administrative and sociocultural matters.

The government credited the solidarity group system with rehabilitating the agricultural sector and increasing food production. The system's contribution to socialism, however, was less visible and significant. According to Chhea Song, deputy minister of agriculture, a mere 10 percent of the solidarity groups really worked collectively in the mid-1980s (seven years after solidarity groups had come into operation). Seventy percent of the solidarity groups performed only some tasks in common, such as preparing the fields and planting seeds. Finally, 20 percent of the agricultural workers farmed their land as individuals and participated in the category of the family economy.

=== Immigrant farms ===
Some members of Chabad have set up tree farms and greenhouses. One of these in Siem Reap received a visit from HM Norodom Sihamoni for the 2012 Cambodian Arbor Day, during which the king planted a tree himself and gave gifts of saplings to their neighbours.

== Rice production ==
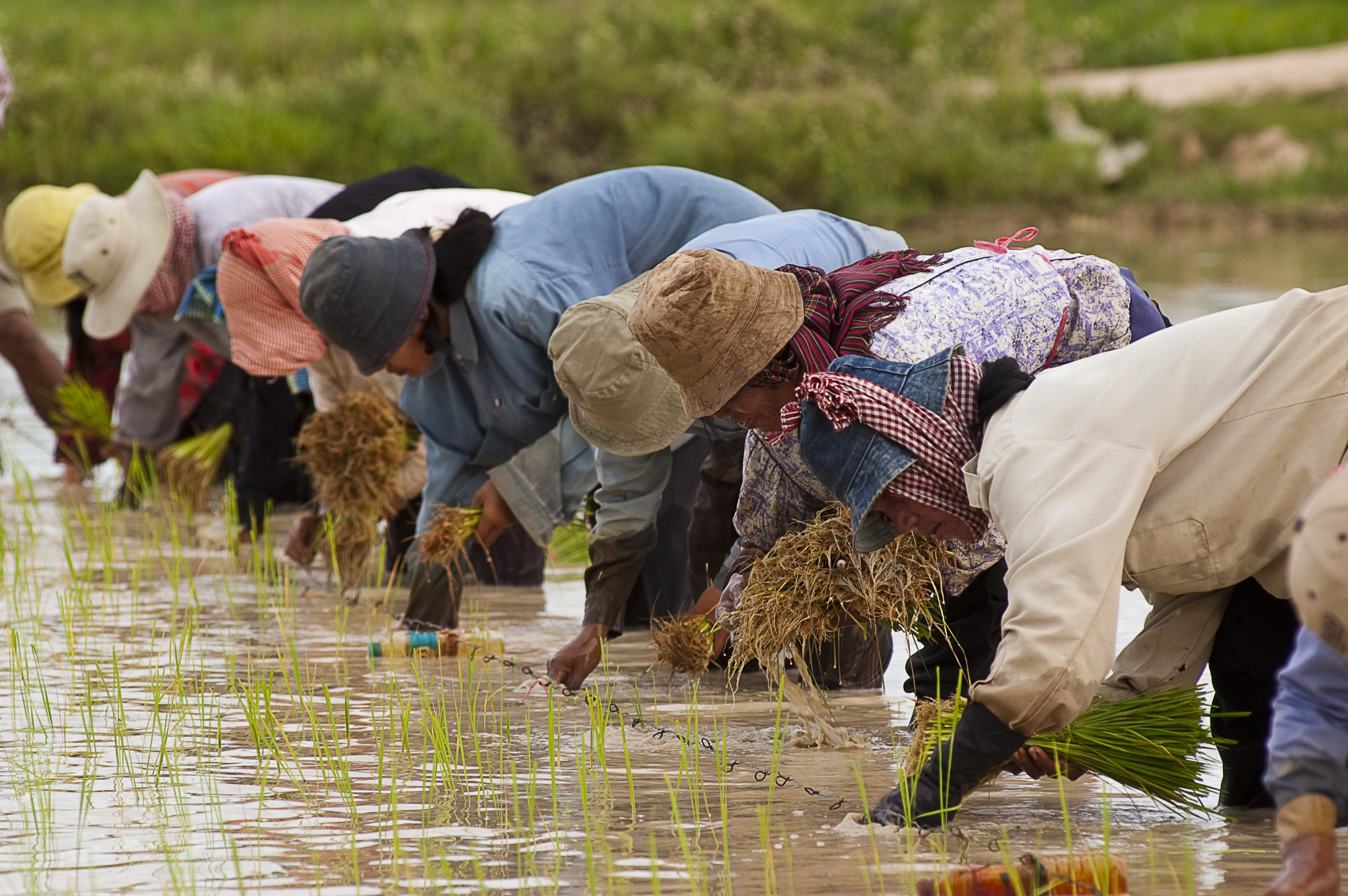
Cambodian farmers planting rice

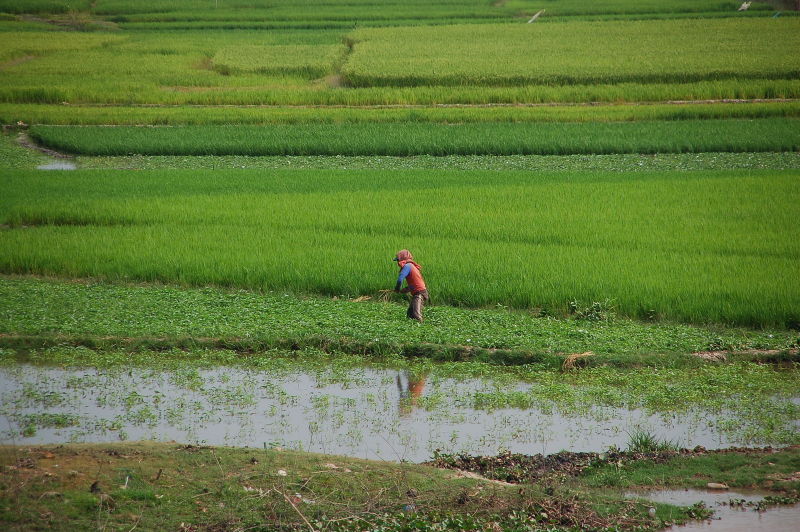
Rice fields in Takeo Province

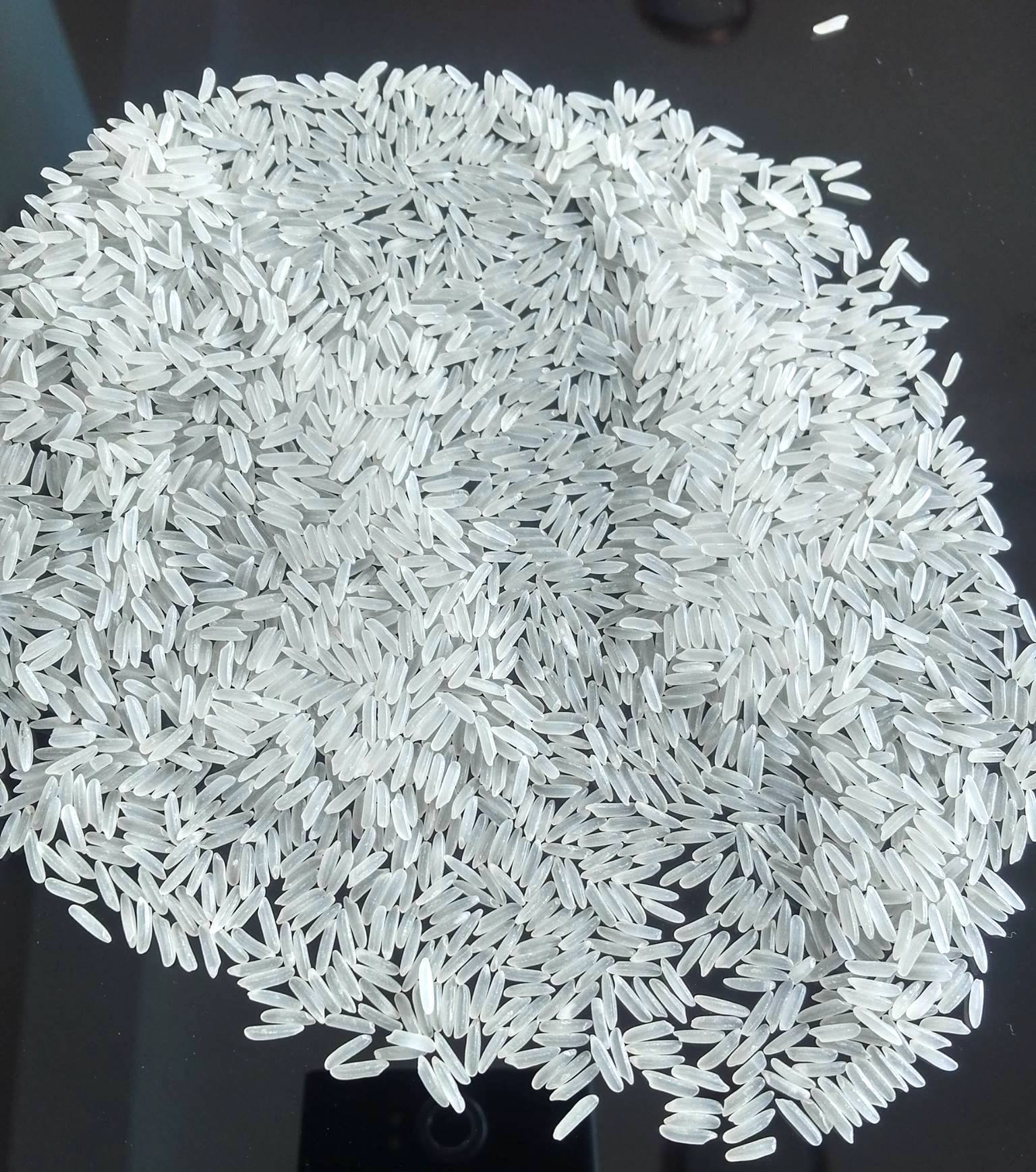
Aromatic long-grain (សែនក្រអូប, sên krâ-op) rice, one of the best paddy rice varieties of Cambodia

In 1987 statistics on rice production were sparse, and they varied depending upon sources. Cambodian government figures were generally lower than those provided by the UN Food and Agriculture Organization (FAO) for the period from 1979 to 1985.

Political and technical factors account for the discrepancies. Data collection in the war-torn nation was difficult because of the lack of trained personnel. Moreover, representatives of international and of foreign relief organizations were not permitted to travel beyond Phnom Penh, except with special permission, because of security and logistics problems. In addition, international and Cambodian sources used different benchmarks in calculating rice production.

The FAO computed the harvest by calendar year; Cambodian officials and private observers based their calculations on the harvest season, which runs from November to February and thus extends over two calendar years. Last of all, a substantial statistical difference exists between milled rice and paddy (unmilled rice) production, compounding problems in compiling accurate estimates. In terms of weight, milled rice averages only 62 percent of the original unmilled paddy. Estimates sometimes refer to these two kinds of rice interchangeably.

Despite statistical discrepancies, there is consensus that annual unmilled rice production during the 1979 to 1987 period did not reach the 1966 level of 2.5 million tons. Nevertheless, since 1979, Cambodian rice production has increased gradually (except during the disastrous 1984 to 1985 season), and the nation in the late 1980s had just begun to achieve precarious self-sufficiency if estimates were borne out.

Cambodia's cultivated rice land can be divided into three areas. The first and richest (producing more than one ton of rice per hectare) covers the area of the Tonle Sap Basin and the provinces of Battambang, Kampong Thum, Kampong Cham, Kandal, Prey Veng, and Svay Rieng. The second area, which yields an average of four-fifths of a ton of rice per hectare, consists of Kampot and Koh Kong provinces along the Gulf of Thailand, and some less fertile areas of the central provinces. The third area, with rice yields of less than three-fifths of a ton per hectare, comprises the highlands and the mountainous provinces of Preah Vihear, Stoeng Treng, Ratanakiri, and Mondulkiri.

Cambodia has two rice crops each year, a monsoon-season crop (long-cycle) and a dry-season crop. The major monsoon crop is planted in late May through July when the first rains of the monsoon season begin to inundate and soften the land. Rice shoots are transplanted from late June through September. The main harvest is usually gathered six months later, in December. The dry-season crop is smaller, and it takes less time to grow (three months from planting to harvest). It is planted in November in areas that have trapped or retained part of the monsoon rains, and it is harvested in January or February. The dry-season crop seldom exceeds 15 percent of the total annual production.

In addition to these two regular crops, peasants plant floating rice in April and in May in the areas around the Tonle Sap (Great Lake), which floods and expands its banks in September or early October. Before the flooding occurs, the seed is spread on the ground without any preparation of the soil, and the floating rice is harvested nine months later, when the stems have grown to three or four meters in response to the peak of the flood (the floating rice has the property of adjusting its rate of growth to the rise of the floodwaters so that its grain heads remain above water). It has a low yield, probably less than half that of most other rice types, but it can be grown inexpensively on land for which there is no other use.

The per-hectare rice yield in Cambodia is among the lowest in Asia. The average yield for the wet crop is about 0.95 ton of unmilled rice per hectare. The dry-season crop yield is traditionally higher—1.8 tons of unmilled rice per hectare. New rice varieties (IR36 and IR42) have much higher yields—between five and six tons of unmilled rice per hectare under good conditions. Unlike local strains, however, these varieties require a fair amount of urea and phosphate fertilizer (25,000 tons for 5,000 tons of seed), which the government could not afford to import in the late 1980s.

=== Effect of changing climate ===
Unseasonable droughts and unpredictable rainfall are increasingly disrupting rice cultivation and forcing Cambodian farmers to search for jobs in cities. Traditional rice farming relied on rain falling predictably two times a year, which used to occur with regularity. As of 2018 rains tend to fall in one short downfall.

== Other crops ==
The main secondary crops in the late 1980s were maize, cassava, sweet potatoes, groundnuts, soybeans, sesame seeds, dry beans, and rubber. According to Phnom Penh, the country produced 92,000 tons of corn (maize), as well as 100,000 tons of cassava, about 34,000 tons of sweet potatoes, and 37,000 tons of dry beans in 1986. In 1987 local officials urged residents of the different agricultural regions of the country to step up the cultivation of subsidiary food crops, particularly of starchy crops, to make up for the rice deficit caused by a severe drought.

The principal commercial crop is rubber. In the 1980s it was an important primary commodity, second only to rice, and one of the country's few sources of foreign exchange. Rubber plantations were damaged extensively during the war (as much as 20,000 hectares was destroyed), and recovery was very slow. In 1986 rubber production totaled about 24,500 tons (from an area of 36,000 hectares, mostly in Kampong Cham Province), far below the 1969 prewar output of 50,000 tons (produced from an area of 50,000 hectares).

The government began exporting rubber and rubber products in 1985. A major customer was the Soviet Union, which imported slightly more than 10,000 tons of Cambodian natural rubber annually in 1985 and in 1986. In the late 1980s, Vietnam helped Cambodia restore rubber-processing plants. The First Plan made rubber the second economic priority, with production targeted at 50,000 tons—from an expanded cultivated area of 50,000 hectares—by 1990.

Other commercial crops included sugarcane, cotton, and tobacco. Among these secondary crops, the First Plan emphasized the production of jute, which was to reach the target of 15,000 tons in 1990.

=== Livestock ===
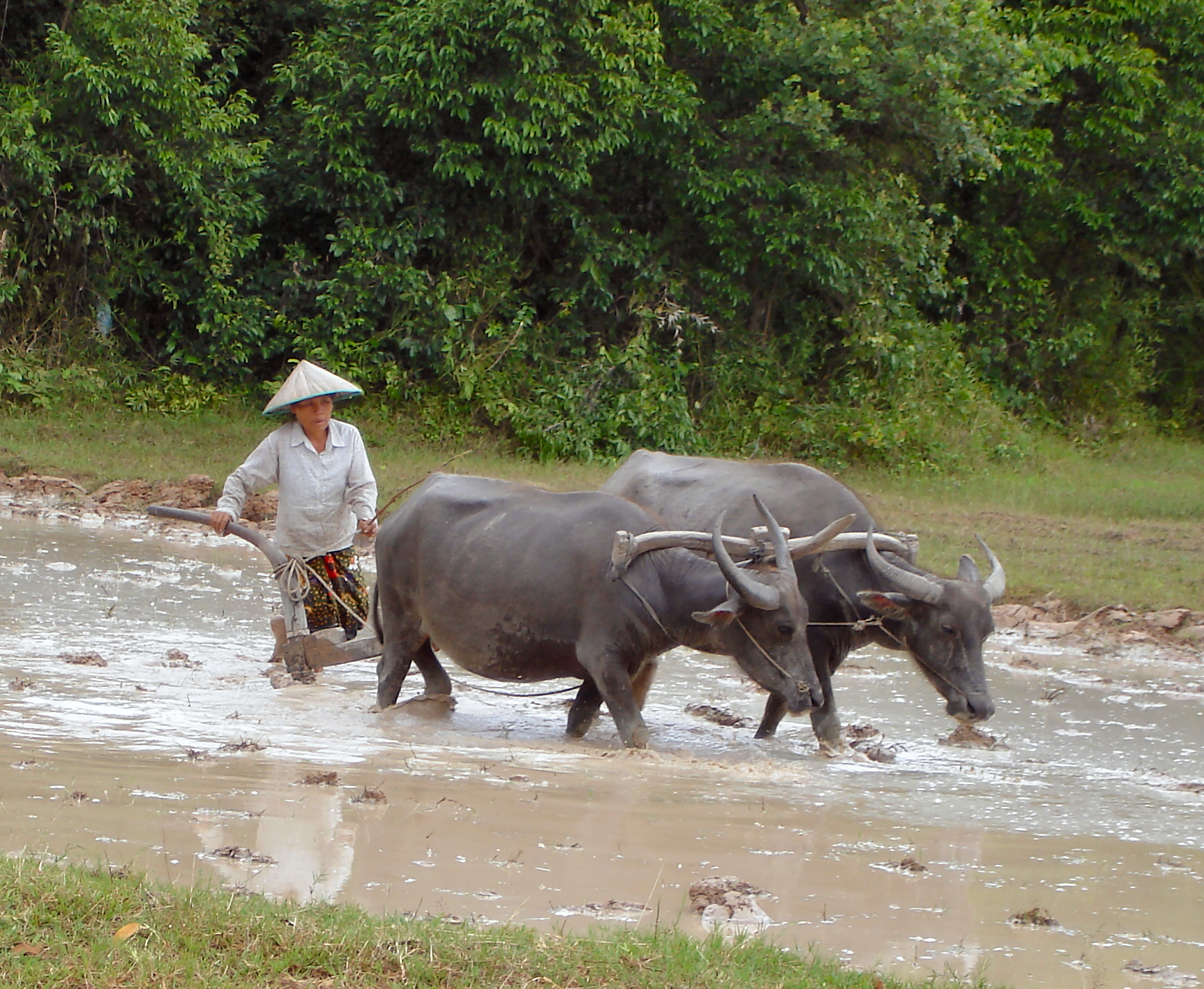
Water buffalos in the paddy fields

Animal husbandry has been an essential part of Cambodian economic life, but a part that farmers have carried on mostly as a sideline. Traditionally, draft animals--water buffalo and oxen—have played a crucial role in the preparation of rice fields for cultivation. In 1979 the decreasing number of draft animals hampered agricultural expansion. In 1967 there were 1.2 million head of draft animals; in 1979 there were only 768,000.

In 1987 Quan Doi Nhan Dan (People's Armed Forces, the Vietnamese army newspaper) reported considerable growth in the raising of draft animals in Cambodia. Between 1979 and 1987, the number of cattle and water buffalo tripled, raising the total to 2.2 million head in 1987. In the same year, there were 1.3 million hogs and 10 million domestic fowl.

=== Fisheries ===
Cambodia's traditional source of protein is freshwater fish, caught mainly from the Tonle Sap and from the Tonle Sab, the Mekong, and the Basak Rivers. Cambodians eat fish fresh, salted, smoked, or made into fish sauce and paste. A fishing program, developed with Western assistance, was very successful in that it more than quadrupled the output of inland freshwater fish in three years, from 15,000 tons in 1979 to 68,700 tons in 1982, a peak year.

== Labor practices ==
The U.S. Department of Labor reported in its 2013 Findings on the Worst Forms of Child Labor that the Cambodian agricultural sector employed underage children who engaged in hazardous activities, from deep-sea and night sea fishing to logging for the production of timber. In 2014, the Bureau of International Labor Affairs issued a List of Goods Produced by Child Labor or Forced Labor where 11 goods were attributed to Cambodia, all of them being produced by child labor.

== Agricultural education and livelihood in rural Cambodia ==
Agricultural education and livelihood in rural Cambodia are interlinked, agriculture plays a prominent role in the lives of over 56% of the working-age population of the country. Promoting agriculture and agro-industry has been identified as the best strategic response to macroeconomic crises in the country also improving food security, rural livelihoods and reducing poverty. The Royal Government of Cambodia's Rectangular Strategy – Phase II (2008–2013) in the Fourth Legislature of the National Assembly defined a long-term vision for growth, employment, equity and efficiency. The strategy seeks to improve (i) agricultural productivity and diversification, including animal husbandry, food security and nutrition, rural development); (ii) land reform and de-mining; (iii) fisheries reform; and (iv) forestry reform (including conservation and environmental protection). Incentive schemes were designed to increase exports, as well as land reform, livestock investment, water source management and clearance of land mines.

== See also ==
- Potato production in Cambodia
- Royal Ploughing Ceremony
- Ministry of Agriculture, Forestry and Fisheries (Cambodia)
