= Ouk Rabun =

Cambodian politician

Ouk Rabun MP
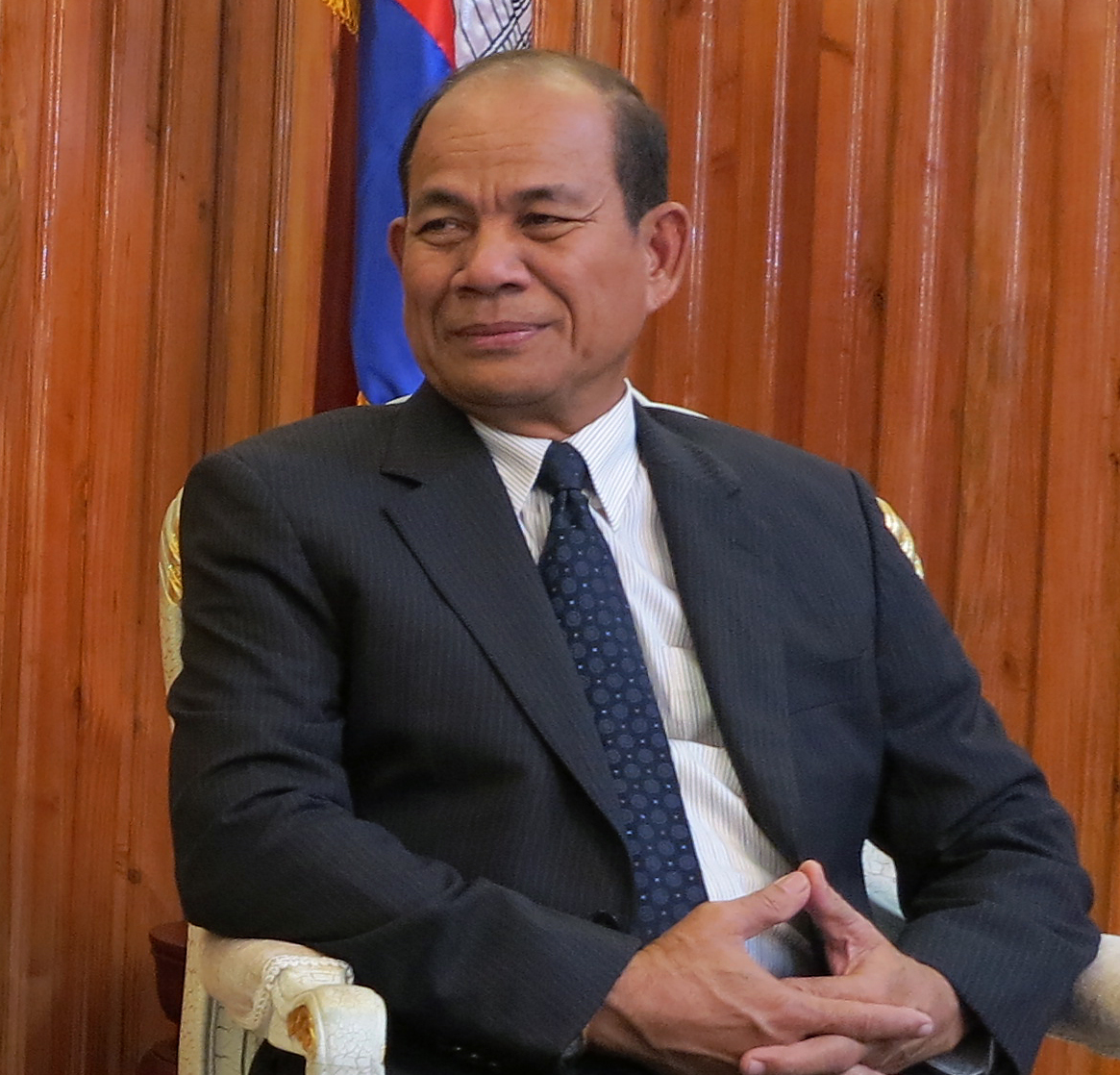
- Rabun in 2014

Minister of Rural Development
- In office 5 April 2016 – 22 August 2023
- Prime Minister: Hun Sen
- Preceded by: Chea Sophara
- Succeeded by: Chhay Rithisen

Minister of Agriculture, Forestry and Fisheries
- In office 24 September 2013 – 5 April 2016
- Prime Minister: Hun Sen
- Preceded by: Chan Sarun
- Succeeded by: Veng Sakhon

Member of Parliament for Kampong Chhnang
- In office 23 September 2013 – 18 September 2018

Personal details
- Born: 27 January 1951 (age 75)
- Party: Cambodian People's Party

Ouk Rabun is a Cambodian politician, and the current Minister of Rural Development, previously serving as the Minister of Agriculture, Forestry and Fisheries. He is a member of the Cambodian People's Party.
