= Ministry of Agriculture, Forestry and Fisheries (Cambodia) =

Government ministry of Cambodia

- ក្រសួងកសិកម្ម រុក្ខាប្រមាញ់ និងនេសាទ

Agency overview
- Jurisdiction: Government of Cambodia
- Headquarters: Mao Tse Tung Blvd, Phnom Penh, Cambodia
- Minister responsible: Dith Tina, Minister of Agriculture, Forestry and Fisheries
- Website: maff.gov.kh

The Ministry of Agriculture, Forestry and Fisheries (Khmer: ក្រសួងកសិកម្ម រុក្ខាប្រមាញ់ និងនេសាទ) is the government ministry of Cambodia that is responsible for governing activities of agriculture, forestry and the fishery industry in Cambodia.

== Institutions ==
Public schools, companies and rubber plantations related to the Ministry include:

- Royal University of Agriculture (RUA)
- Cambodia Agricultural Research and Development Institute (CARDI)
- Prek Leap National College of Agriculture (PNCA)
- Kampong Cham National School of Agriculture
- Agricultural Input Company
- Cambodia Rubber Development Company
- Cambodia Rubber Research Institute
- Rubber Import, Export, Transport and Equipment Company
- Rubber Plantation Companies: Chup Rubber Plantation Co., Krek Rubber Plantation Co., Memut Rubber Plantation Co., Snoul Rubber Plantation Co., Chamkar Andong Rubber Plantation Co., Beungket Rubber Plantation Co. and Peam Cheing Rubber Plantation Co.

== Crimes and disturbing issues ==
In the years of 2007-8 the Cambodian Government, was responsible for the sale of 45% of the total landmass in Cambodia to primarily foreign investors. The land concessions are to be used for agro-industrial, forestry, tourism and constructional projects, even though larger parts of the land are wildlife protections or national parks even (See Cardamom Mountains for example). The vast majority of the Economic Land Concessions (ELCs) have in fact been issued in violation of Cambodia's 2001 Land Law and its Subdecree on ELCs and are therefore illegal.

The landsales has been perceived by observers, to be the result of extensive land grabbing and corruption within the judicial system, ministries and government bureaucracy of Cambodia. It has stirred serious unrest across the country, within recent years.

== Ministers ==
Portrait	Name	Tenure		Party
Portrait	Name	From	To	Party
	Chan Sarun ច័ន្ទ សារុន (1948-2026)	30 November 1998	23 September 2013	CPP
	Ouk Rabun (b. 1951)	24 September 2013	5 April 2016	CPP
	Veng Sakhon វេង សាខុន (b. 1960)	5 April 2016	8 October 2022	CPP
	Aun Pornmoniroth អូន ព័ន្ធមុនីរ័ត្ន (b. 1965); Acting	8 October 2022	17 October 2022	CPP
	Dith Tina ឌិត ទីណា (b. 1979)	17 October 2022	Present	CPP

== See also ==
- Agriculture in Cambodia
- Deforestation in Cambodia
