= Poverty in Cambodia =

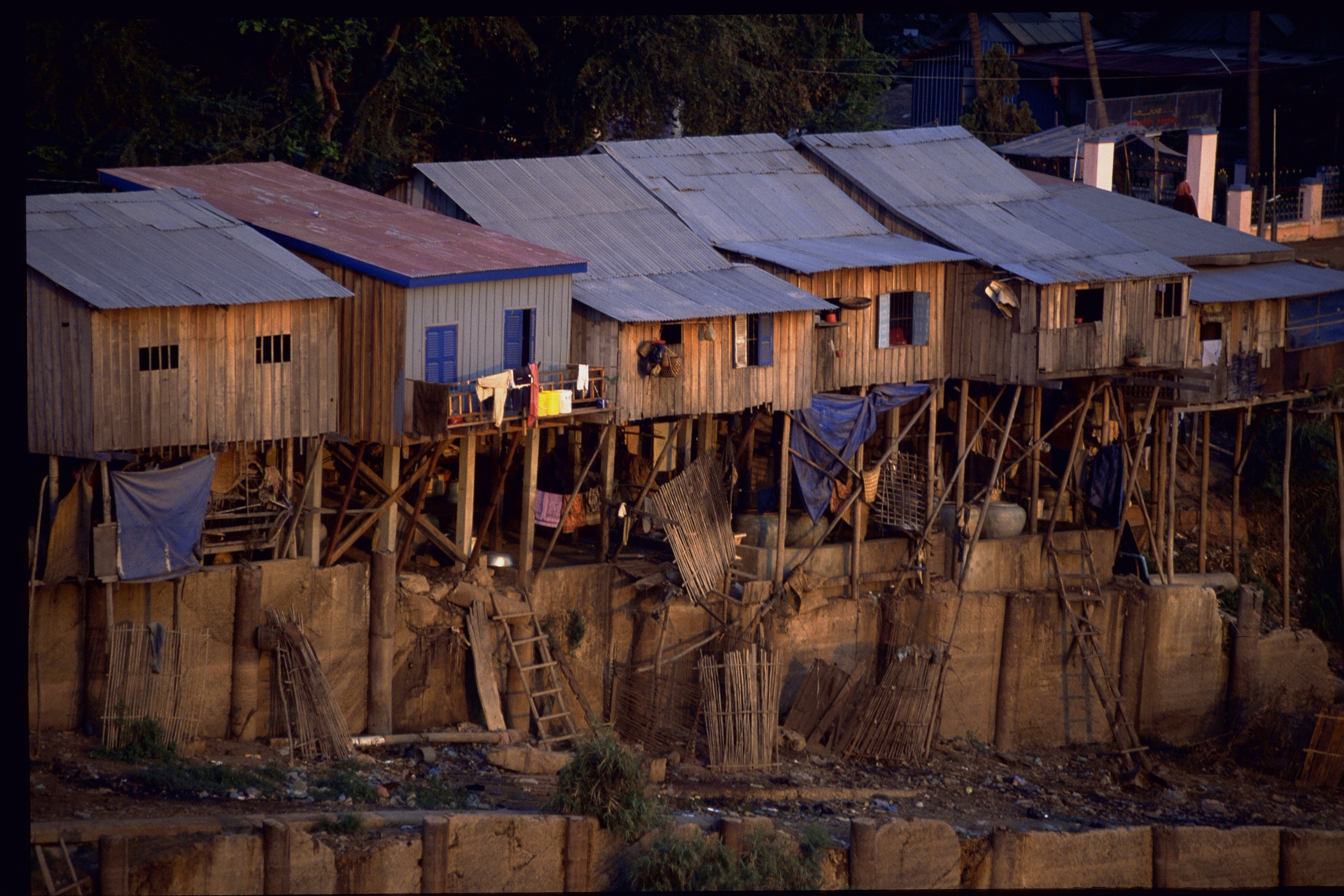
Homes built along the bank of the Bassac River in the capital city Phnom Penh, 2013.

Cambodia remains on the list of developing countries, despite recent economic growth. Although Cambodia is undergoing significant urbanization. Cambodia has made progress in combating poverty, and many citizens have risen just above the poverty line.

== Context ==
=== Poverty levels in the 1990s ===
In order to estimate the poverty levels in Cambodia, the government carried out its first large-scale national survey. The level of poverty in rural areas was estimated at 45 percent, which was four times that of the capital city. The outcome of the study made it possible for the country to come up with the First Socioeconomic Development Plan that was to run from 1996 to 2000.

=== Regional dimensions ===
An assessment of the poverty situation in Cambodia reveals patterns of regional variations. Some of the provinces record a high poverty rate compared to others. Areas with high poverty rates include Ratanak Kiri, Kampong Thom, and Preah Vihear. According to a study conducted, Ratanak Kiri had a poverty rate of 55.2 percent, Preah Vihear had a poverty rate of 72.3 percent, and Kampong Thom had a poverty rate of 75.8 percent. The inequality in the regional distribution of wealth is attributable to low literacy levels.

A high number of people in Cambodia live in poverty especially the ones who live in rural areas. Globally, individuals living in rural areas record more elevated levels of lack compared to their counterparts living in urban areas. About 80 percent of the population in Cambodia live in rural areas. By 2012, the rural poverty rate was about 28.8 percent, accounting for three times urban poverty rate which stood at 6.4 percent at the same time. Over time, poverty has dramatically reduced in both rural and urban areas. However, one thing is real that the remaining poverty is more concentrated in rural areas.

=== Gender dimensions ===
Cambodian women experience higher levels of poverty compared to men. Although women participation in the labor force in Cambodia has increased from 76 to 80 percent in the years between 2008 and 2012, there are prominent gender inequalities in employment. Women's participation in unpaid domestic work constrains their economic advancement. Women continue to participate significantly in the vulnerable employment sector, especially in agriculture.

Gender wage gap remains high with women concentration in the low paying jobs such as forestry and retail trade. Just a small percent of women engage in highly paid employment occupations such as managers and technicians. Women have low levels of required skills to participate in meaningful employment and they also experience difficulties due to discrimination practices.

In the long run, women suffer worse economic conditions compared to men and the rise in the number of female-headed households worsens the situation. Again, women are the primary caregivers, and they spend a lot of money on household consumption. Therefore, they have less money to save or buy assets.

== Poverty Reduction Measures ==
The government of Cambodia has come up with numerous ways to try and reduce the level of poverty. For instance, it instituted the National Poverty Reduction Strategy in 2002 aimed at reducing the poverty levels in the country. The government is putting in place strategies that will see an increase in Foreign Direct Investment (FDI) in the country. The government also welcomed the participation of the NGO's in the eradication of poverty. Given that the strategy that was launched in 2002 and has seen little success, the government has reworked its policy framework to ensure a greater inclusion of NGO's and better coordination of the process of eradicating poverty.

It came up with the Second Socio-Economic Development Plan (SEDP II) that would remove duplication of tasks and allow a more inclusive approach instead of the government bearing all the burden of improving the socioeconomic situation of the country. Under the Council for the Development of Cambodia (CDC), the government welcomes the NGO's in eradicating poverty in the country. Working with the NGOs is guided by the Rectangular Strategy that looks at factors such as peace, partnership in development, regional and international integration, and creating favorable financial and macroeconomic environment.

In 2013, the government of Cambodia implemented "Rectangular Strategy - Phase III" for growth, employment, equity, and efficiency. This strategy focused on ensuring an average economic growth of 7%, establishing more job for its citizens especially youth, reducing poverty by 1% every year, and strengthening institutional capacity and governance.

== Increased Vulnerability to Poverty ==
Cambodia has experienced a tremendous drop in poverty but there is a high chance of relapsing to poverty. Poverty rate in Cambodia dropped from 52.2 percent in 2004 to 20.5 percent in 2011. However, most of the individuals only moved from a state of being poor to state of being vulnerable to becoming poor. Most of the individuals only moved just above the poverty line. A research reveals that a small shock of about US $0.30 per day would, equal to the price of two water bottles, lead to doubling the poverty status in Cambodia. The high number of individuals who are nearing the poverty line are like to fall into multi-dimensional poverty if they experience shock from drought, unemployment or sickness. As of 2018, report from UNDP illustrates that at least thirty-five percent of Cambodians still live in poverty.

Eradicating all forms of poverty remains the most significant challenge facing humanity. The nation of Cambodia is not any different since even after making considerable strides to get away from poverty, the country has a high number of people who are vulnerable to becoming poor. Individuals experience poverty in different ways in their lives including the inability to access health care, the failure to earn enough income to cater for their needs and the failure to complete schooling. Such is the situation in Cambodia where there is a high number of people working in agriculture and informal employment.

== Indicators of Poverty ==
=== Macroeconomics ===
The macroeconomic indicators reveal the extent of poverty in the overall economy of Cambodia. Cambodia recorded a Gross Domestic Product of 16.7 billion in 2014, placing the country as accounting only for 0.7 percent of the economic activity of the entire ASEAN region. The low GDP placed the country as the poorest country in the region. At the same time, Cambodia recorded a stronger relative economic performance compared to others ASEAN countries.

=== Labor Force Characteristics ===
A high number of rural people participate in agricultural activities. A high population of individuals living the country works in the farming sector. Research reveals that about 33.3 percent of the total employed population in Cambodia work in the agricultural industry. Similar to other developing countries, the citizens who engage in the farming sector suffer the vulnerability of climate shocks including flooding and drought. At the same, the prices of agricultural products are likely to be low due to their high supply, especially after the dry season.

There is widespread lack of job security in Cambodia. A vast majority of the Cambodians work in the informal sector, and they experience widespread employment vulnerabilities. A survey by the National Institute of Statistics (NIS) of Cambodia revealed that 60.2 percent of the citizens worked in the informal sector. The number of individuals working in the casual industry is even higher when those working in the agricultural sector are added to the group.

Job insecurity is widespread in the informal sector, and individuals can quickly become unemployed. The casual sector employment attracts low wages, and the workers can barely make any savings to improve their economic situation. Informal sector employment does not have insurance and pension benefits, thus worsening the financial condition of the already impoverished individuals.

Cambodia has high levels of youth unemployment. The country recorded a low unemployment rate of about 0.3 percent in 2014. However, detailed assessments of the labor market show problematic and high levels of youth unemployment especially the youths living in urban areas. A survey by the National Institute of Statistics of Cambodia revealed that about 202,304 Cambodian nationals aged above 15 years are unemployed. The high levels of youth unemployment contribute to a high dependency ratio at the family level and increased pressure on the available resources at the family level.

Unemployment contributes to lack of income and following poor standards of living. Also, there is a current trend involving movement from the agricultural sector to the industry and the services sector. However, there is stagnation in the productivity in the industries. Still, the sectorial shifts have not done much in leading to employment in the occupations requiring high skills.

=== Poor Health Outcomes ===
Lack of access to sanitation and water facilities continue to pose a significant challenge to the health care system. Only 18 percent of the entire rural populations have access to improved sanitation and water facilities. Moreover, only 56 percent of the individuals living in rural areas have access to drinking water. Like many other developing countries, most of the common diseases experienced in the country are attributable to problems of water and sanitation.

Cambodia has high levels of infant mortality due to malnutrition and associated complications. The infant mortality rate in Cambodia is higher compared to any other country in the Association of Southeast Asian Nations (ASEAN) region. Cambodia has a high mortality rate of about 30 percent. Moreover, the five key top killers of young children included malnutrition which accounts for 11 percent of deaths.

Another study revealed that 30 percent of the children living in the rural areas of the country are underweight. The situation regarding the number of high underweight children persists despite the government measures to increased food intake. The high number of underweight children is highly related to poor diet.

The urban poor in Cambodia move among hungry days (one or two meals of low-quality rice with fish sauce or sour soup); filling days (two meals of better-quality rice and soup with vegetables and fish); and good days (three meals of high-quality rice, varied vegetables and protein, and fruit). Food security is affected by debt, natural disasters, an insufficient public safety net, and low and irregular incomes.

Cambodia continues to battle with lifestyle diseases, sex work for money, and poor living conditions. The critical health problems in the country include tuberculosis, malaria, and diarrheal diseases. An approximate number of 75,000 people are living with HIV/AIDS. The HIV prevalence rate stands at 0.6 percent of the adult population. In 2014 alone, the country spent about US$50.2 million in handling HIV issues. Diseases are an indication of poverty and they propagate poverty in the long run since they lead to the use of a significant amount of money that would otherwise be used for economic development.

=== Poor Education Outcomes ===
Economic struggles contribute to poor education outcomes in the country. Education is expensive for individuals who cannot access basic human needs. There are high levels of school dropout rates in the country as the young children seek employment to provide for their economic needs. The state continues to experience high levels of illiteracy.

By 2011, just 29 percent of the adults who are above 25 years of age had attained primary school education — also, illiteracy levels among the individuals who are between 15 and 24 years of age amount to 11.1 percent. A look at the enrollment rates reveals the extent of poverty in hindering educational advancement for a high number of children in the country. In 2011, the enrollment rates in primary school amounted to 48.8 percent in 2011 while the net enrollment rate in secondary school amounted to 54.2 percent. Generally, the education outcomes in Cambodia are lower than the average level for the poor countries.
