= Veng Sakhon =

Cambodian politician (born 1960)

His Excellency Veng Sakhon
- វេង សាខុន

Minister of Agriculture, Forestry and Fisheries
- In office 4 April 2016 – 8 October 2022
- Prime Minister: Hun Sen
- Preceded by: Ouk Rabun
- Succeeded by: Dith Tina

Personal details
- Born: 5 August 1960 (age 66)
- Party: Cambodian People's Party
- Education: Institute of Technology of Cambodia

Veng Sakhon (Khmer: វេង សាខុន; born 5 August 1960) was the Cambodian Minister of Agriculture, Forestry and Fisheries from April 2016 to October 2022.
