= Charya Burt =

Cambodian-American Khmer classical dancer

Neak Kru Charya Cheam Burt
- Born: Chancharya Cheam; July 15, 1970 (age 55); Phnom Penh, Cambodia
- Education: Dance at Royal University of Fine Arts; BA in Liberal Arts Cum Laude at Sonoma State University
- Spouse: Rob Burt
- Parent(s): Bee Cheam, Sameth Chheng
- Relatives: Chheng Phon
- Website: https://charyaburt.com

Charya Cheam Burt (born July 15, 1970) is a Cambodian-born American dancer, choreographer, vocalist, and teacher of Khmer classical dance. She is founder of Charya Burt Cambodian Dance company based in North San Francisco Bay Area, California, United States.

== Life and career ==
Charya Cheam Burt was born in Phnom Penh, Cambodia, to Bee Cheam and Sameth Chheng. Following the Khmer Rouge genocide, Burt was inspired to dance by her uncle Chheng Phon, training with Cambodia's surviving dance masters including Soth Sam On and toured internationally as a member of Royal Dance Troupe of Cambodia. In 1990, she became a dance faculty member at Cambodia's Royal University of Fine Arts.

In 1993, Burt emigrated to the United States. Since then, she has been performing classical and original dances, creating and choreographing new dance works rooted in tradition, and training students throughout California, including multiple stints as artist-in-residence at Cambodian cultural centers in Stockton, San Jose, and Khmer Arts Academy in Long Beach.

An inaugural Dance/USA and 2022 Americans for the Arts Johnson Fellow and Isadora Duncan Award recipient for Individual Performance, Burt has received multiple grants from the Center for Cultural Innovation, Creative Work Fund, and Alliance for California Traditional Arts including their Living Cultures Grant (2021) to create the Charya Burt Cambodian Dance Digital Library. A Hewlett 50 Commission was awarded her in 2021 to create The Rebirth of Apsara: Artistic Lineage, Cultural Resilience and the Resurrection of Cambodian Arts from the Ashes of Genocide that premiered at Sonoma State University's Green Music Center in 2024.

Burt has performed her original works throughout the United States at venues including Jacob's Pillow, San Francisco Ethnic Dance Festival, and Oregon Shakespeare Festival. Themes of her works include preservation and renewal of the Cambodian dance art-form, elevating of community dance groups, histories of Khmer Rouge and South East Asia, and colorism across contemporary cultures.

== Major choreographic works ==
- Beautiful Dark (2024)
  - In partnership with Mosaic America supported by a Creative Work Fund Grant.
  - May 2024 Premiere at Mexican Heritage Plaza Theatre, San Jose, California.
- The Rebirth of Apsara (2024)
  - A Folk And Traditional Arts Hewlett 50 Commission co-produced by New Performance Traditions/Paul Dresher Ensemble.
  - February 2024 Premiere at Weill Hall, Green Music Center, Sonoma State University, Rohnert Park, California.
  - Composer: Chinary Ung
- Silenced (2018)
  - Supported by grants from Investing in Artists/Center for Cultural Innovation, Dancers' Group, and Alliance for California Traditional Arts.
  - June 2018 Premiere with dancers from Khmer Arts Academy at the Studio Theatre Long Beach State University, Long Beach California.
- Of Spirits Intertwined (2018)
  - Presented by World Arts West for the 40th Anniversary of the San Francisco Ethnic Dance Festival, War Memorial Opera House, San Francisco, California.
- Heavenly Garden (2016)

== Major awards and honors ==
- 2021 - 2024 Creative Work Fund to create Beautiful Dark in partnership with Mosaic America
- 2021 - 2024 Hewlett 50 Arts Commission recipient for Folk and Traditional arts to create The Rebirth of Apsara
- 2022 Americans for the Arts Johnson Fellowship for Artists Transforming Communities
- 2022 Yerba Buena Gardens Festival Seed Commission Reassembladge film project
- 2021 – 2022 Alliance for California Traditional Arts (ACTA) Living Cultures Grant Program to establish an archival legacy dance library
- 2021 Alliance for California Traditional Arts (ACTA) Apprenticeship Program
- 2019 – 2020 Inaugural Dance/USA Fellowship: Addressing Social Change
- 2017 - 2018 California Arts Council Activating Community: One-year residency with KAA to produce Silenced
- 2002 Isadora Duncan Dance Award for Outstanding Achievement in Individual Performance 2000-2001
