= Doun Penh section =

Doun Penh ខណ្ឌដូនពេញ
- District (Khan)
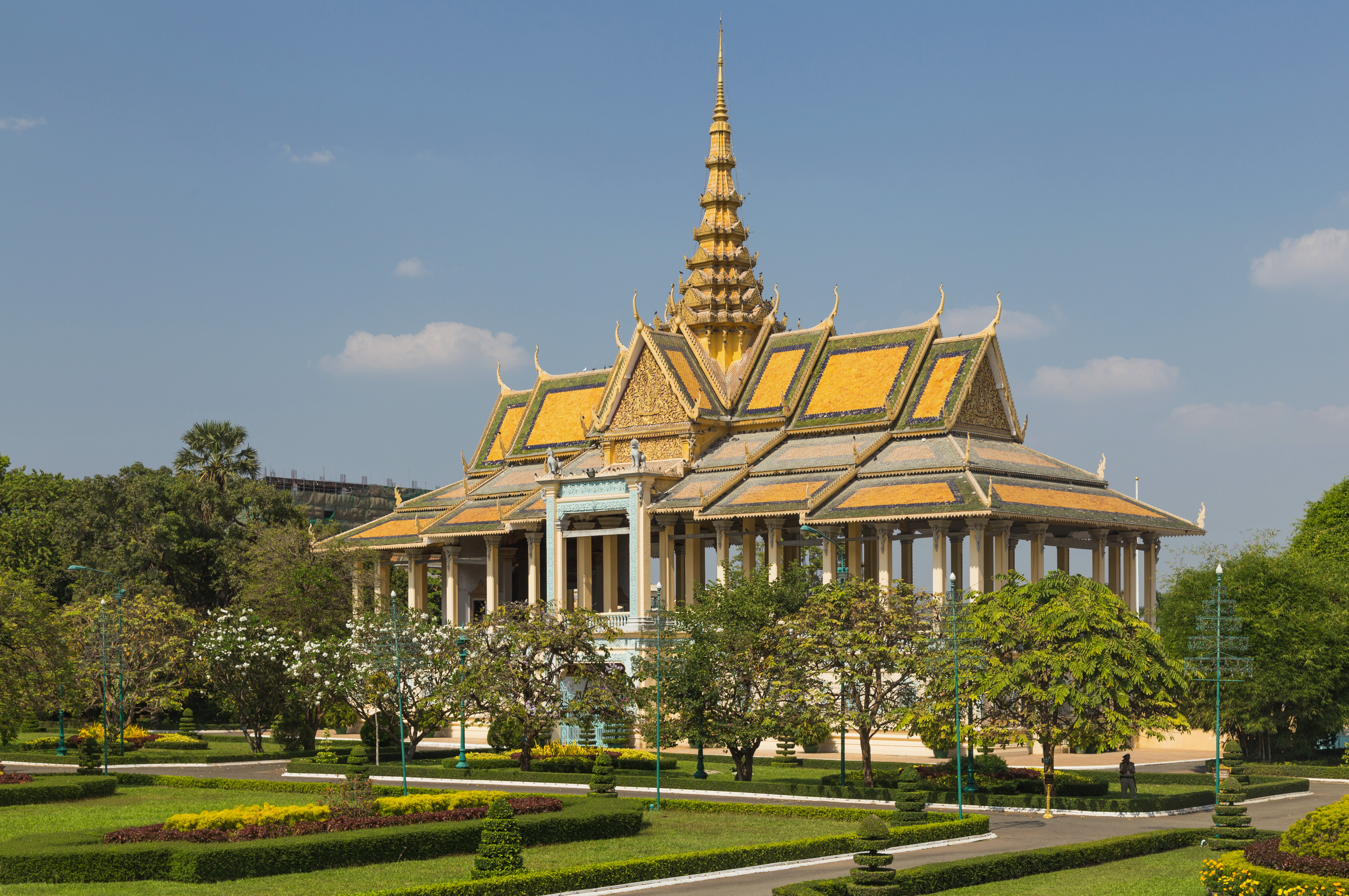
- The Royal Palace, located in Chey Chumneas

- Location within Cambodia
- Coordinates: 11.57561°N 104.92025°E
- Country: Cambodia
- Province: Phnom Penh

Area
  - Total: 7.44 km^{2} (2.87 sq mi)

Population (2019)
  - Total: ▲155,069
- Time zone: UTC+7 (ICT)
- Postal code: 12200
- Geocode: 1202

Doun Penh or Daun Penh (Khmer: ដូនពេញ, Don Pénh [ɗoːn pɨɲ], lit. "Grandmother Penh") is a major district (khan) in Phnom Penh, Cambodia. Many major businesses in Phnom Penh like Sorya Shopping Center and Mokod Pich Jewelry Enterprise are located here. The district has an area of 7.44 km^{2} (2.87 sq mi). According to the 2019 census of Cambodia, it had a population of 155,069.

The district is the commercial hub of Phnom Penh, marked by the Central Market with its unique art deco architecture and several major roads which emanate from and pass near the market. The district is subdivided into 11 sangkats and 134 kroms.

== Administration ==
No.	Sangkat	Postal Code
1	Srah Chak	12201
2	Wat Phnom	12202
3	Phsar Chas	12203
4	Phsar Kandal I	12204
5	Phsar Kandal II	12205
6	Chey Chumneas	12206
7	Chaktomuk	12207
8	Phsar Thmey I	12208
9	Phsar Thmey II	12209
10	Phsar Thmey III	12210
11	Boeng Reang	12211

=== Places of interest ===
- Khalandale Mall Phnom Penh
- FCC Phnom Penh
- Independence Monument
- National Museum of Cambodia
- Norodom Sihanouk Memorial
- Phnom Penh
- Phsar Thom Thmey
- Royal Palace of Cambodia
- Silver Pagoda
- Sisowath Quay
- Sorya Shopping Center
- Wat Botum
- Wat Ounalom
- Wat Phnom

== Gallery ==
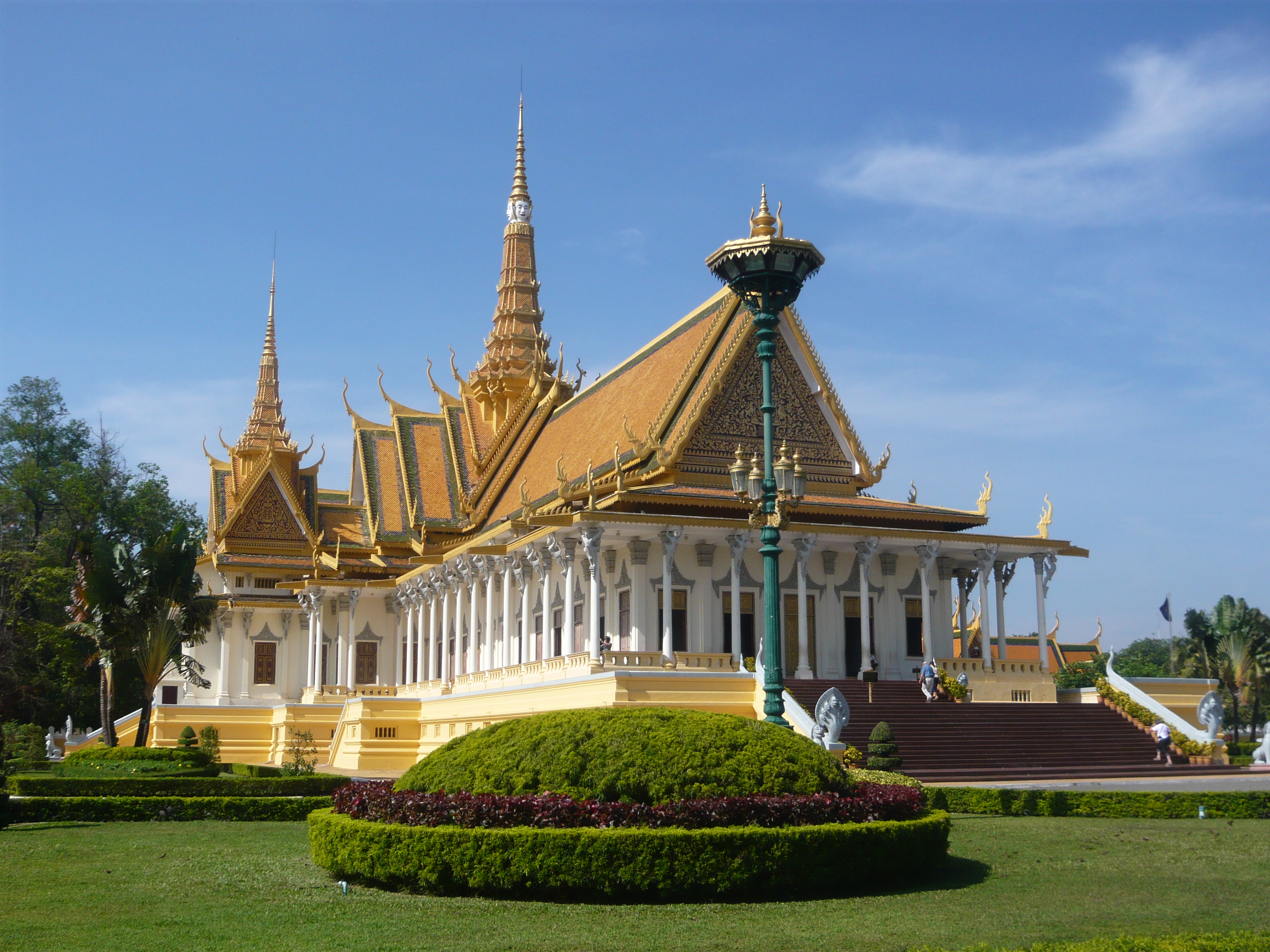
Throne Hall inside the Royal Palace complex

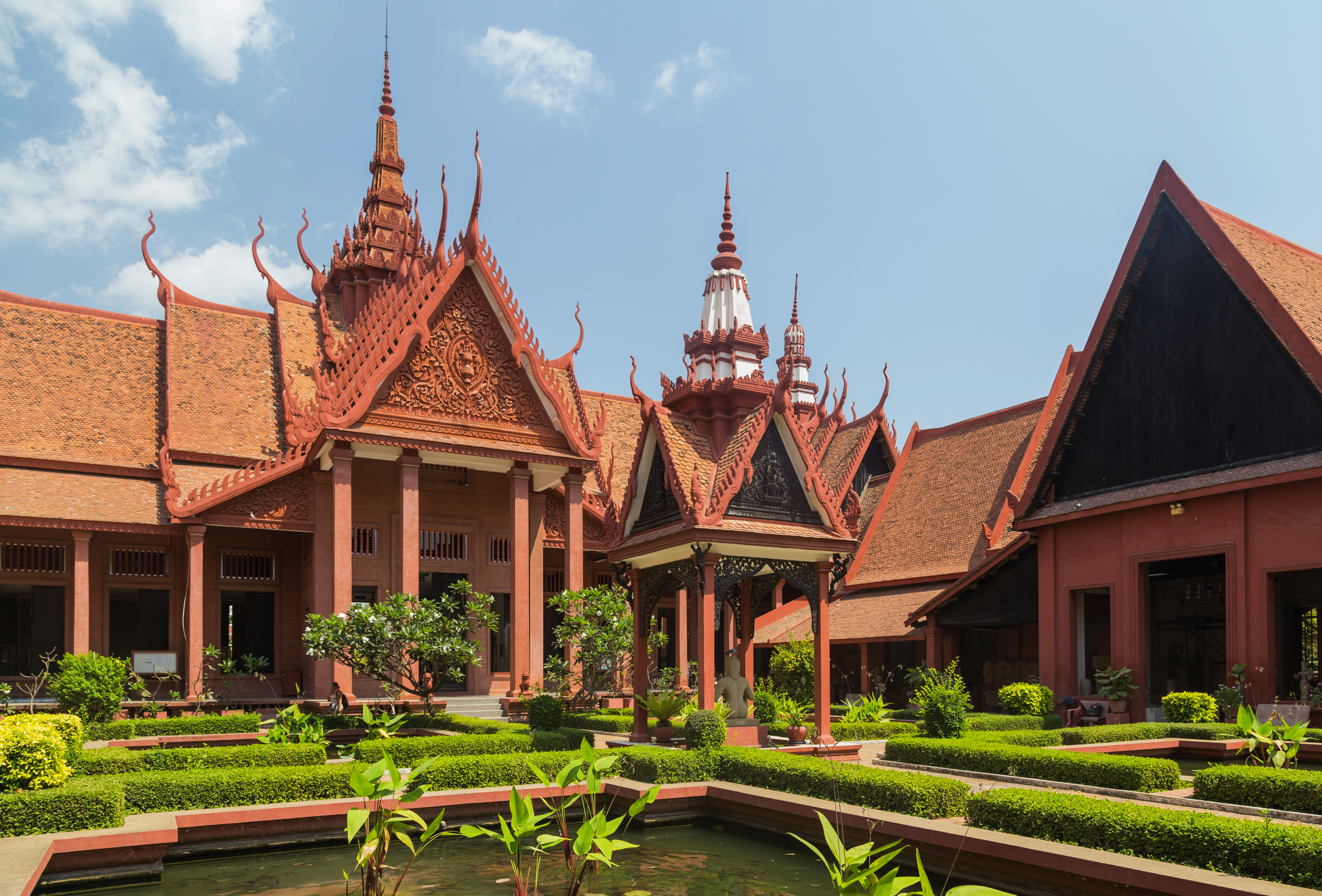
National Museum of Cambodia

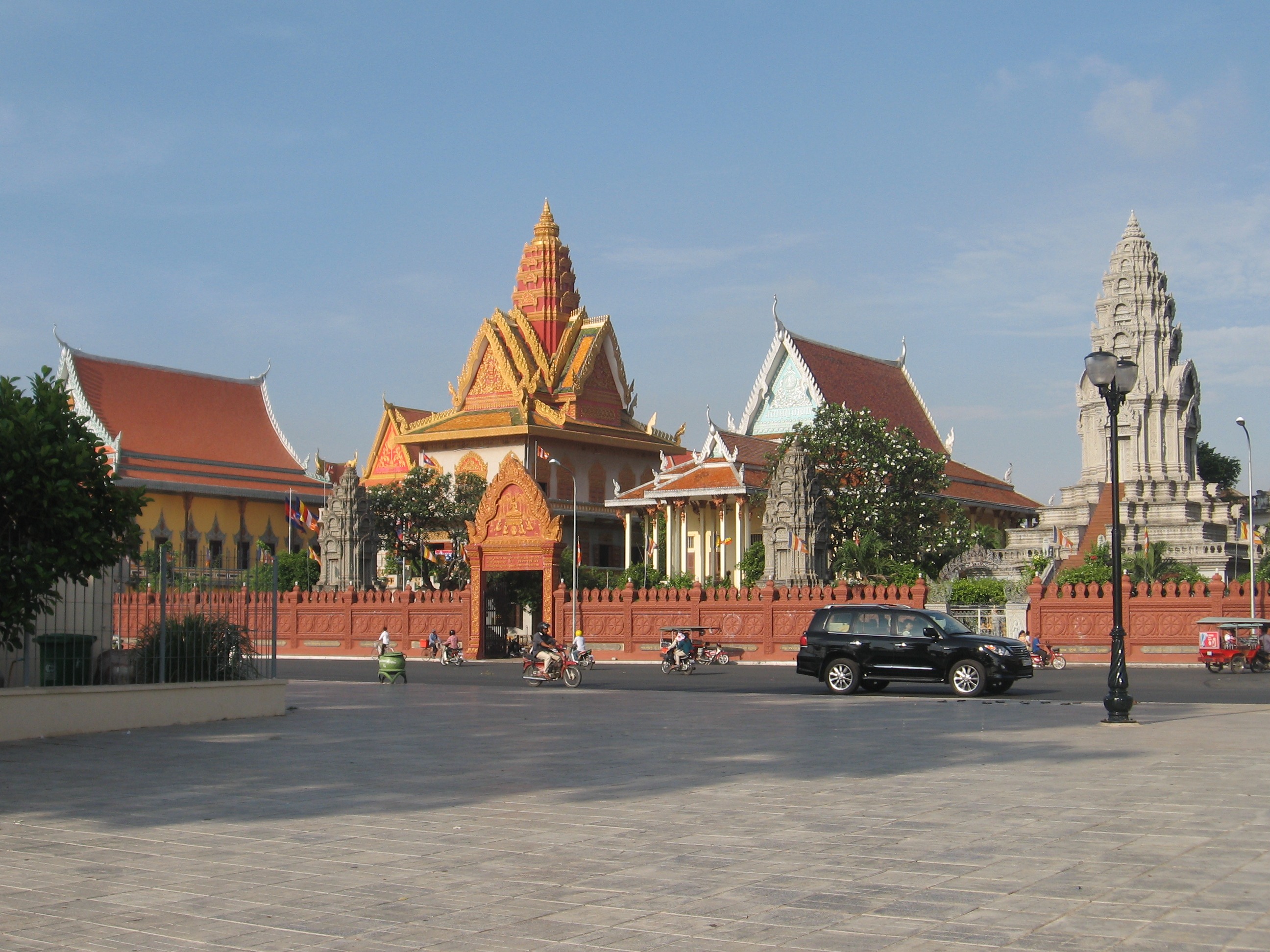
Wat Ounalom

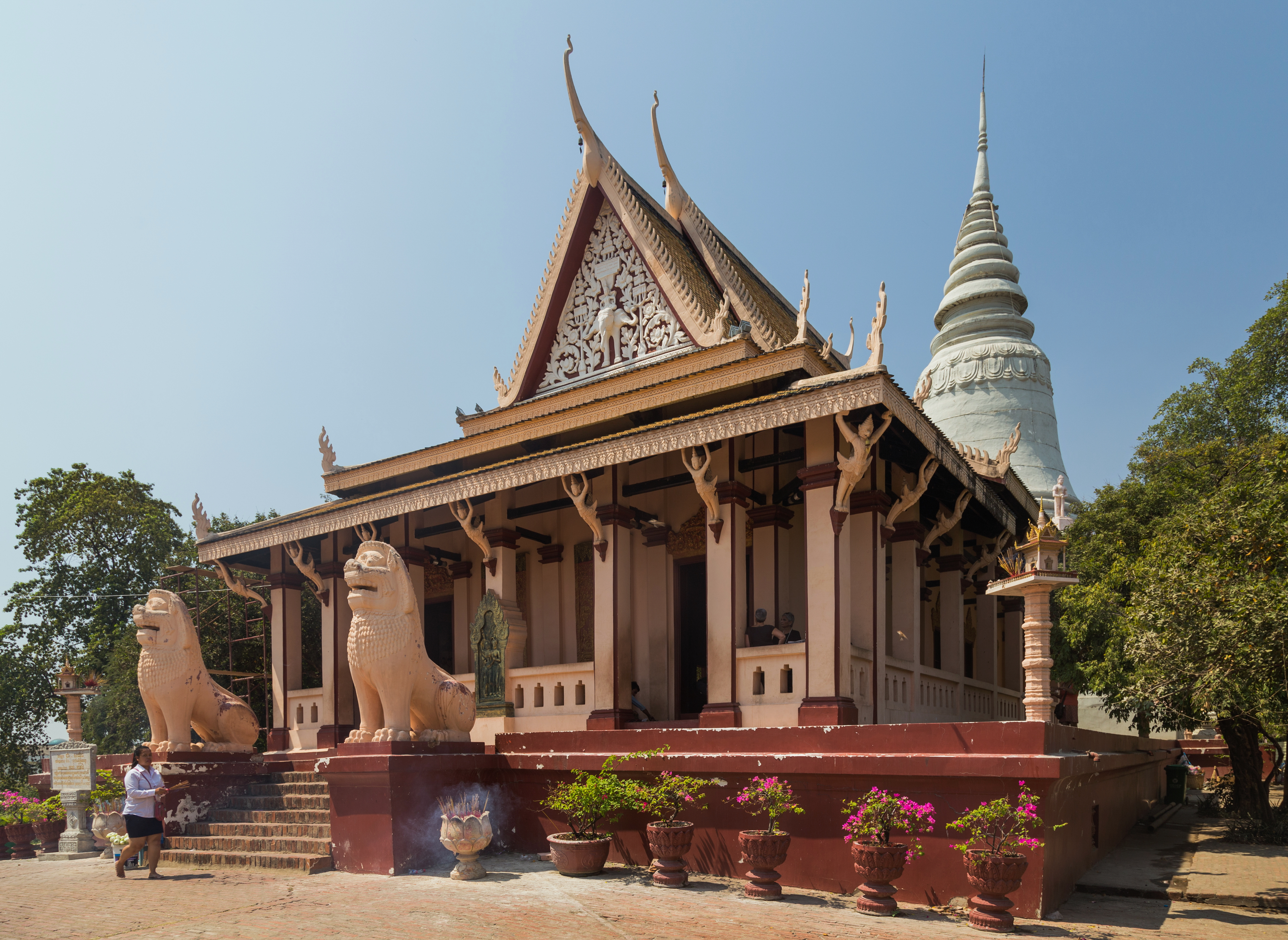
Wat Phnom

== Education ==
- Lycée français René Descartes de Phnom Penh in Wat Phnom sangkat

In 2014, due to the large numbers of schools in the areas, there are congestion problems when the schools dismiss classes.
