= Maestro (surname) =

Maestro is a Spanish surname. Notable people with the surname include:

- Bassi Maestro (born 1973), Italian rapper, deejay, beatmaker, and producer
- Fernando Maestro (born 1974), Spanish retired footballer
- Ignacio Maestro Puch (born 2003), Argentine professional footballer
- Iván Maestro (born 1988), Spanish motorcycle racer
- Johnny Maestro (1939–2010), American pop singer
- Mía Maestro (born 1978), Argentine actress and singer
- Nestor El Maestro (born 1983), Serbian football manager
- Rolando Del Maestro (born 1949), Italian-born Canadian neurosurgeon
- Roser Maestro (born 1988), Spanish communist politician
- Virginia Maestro (born 1982), Spanish singer-songwriter

== See also ==
- Maestro (disambiguation)
- Maestro Curtis (born 1956), American musician, composer, author, producer, arranger, and music executive
- Maestro Harrell (born 1991), American DJ, singer, rapper, actor, and record producer
