= National Museum of Cambodia =

Museum in Phnom Penh, Cambodia

Coordinates: 11.5658°N 104.9290°E

- សារមន្ទីរជាតិ
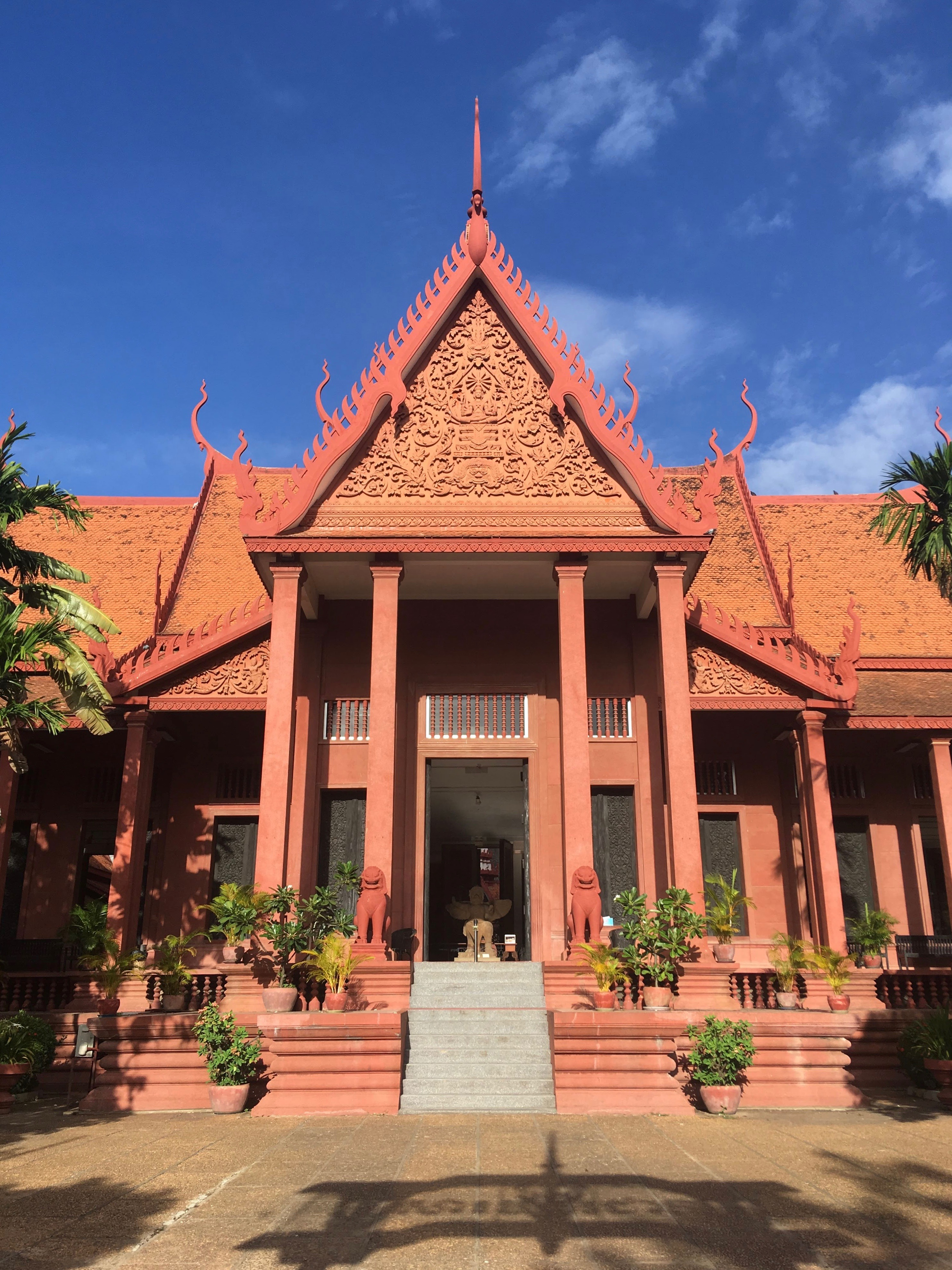
- Entrance of the National Museum
- Established: 13 April 1920; 106 years ago
- Location: Preah Ang Eng St. (13), Phnom Penh
- Type: Art, archaeology, history
- Director: Chhay Visoth
- Website: cambodiamuseum.info

The National Museum of Cambodia (Khmer: សារមន្ទីរជាតិ, romanized: Saromontir Cheate) is Cambodia's largest museum of cultural history and is the country's leading historical and archaeological museum. It is located in Chey Chumneas, Phnom Penh.

== Overview ==
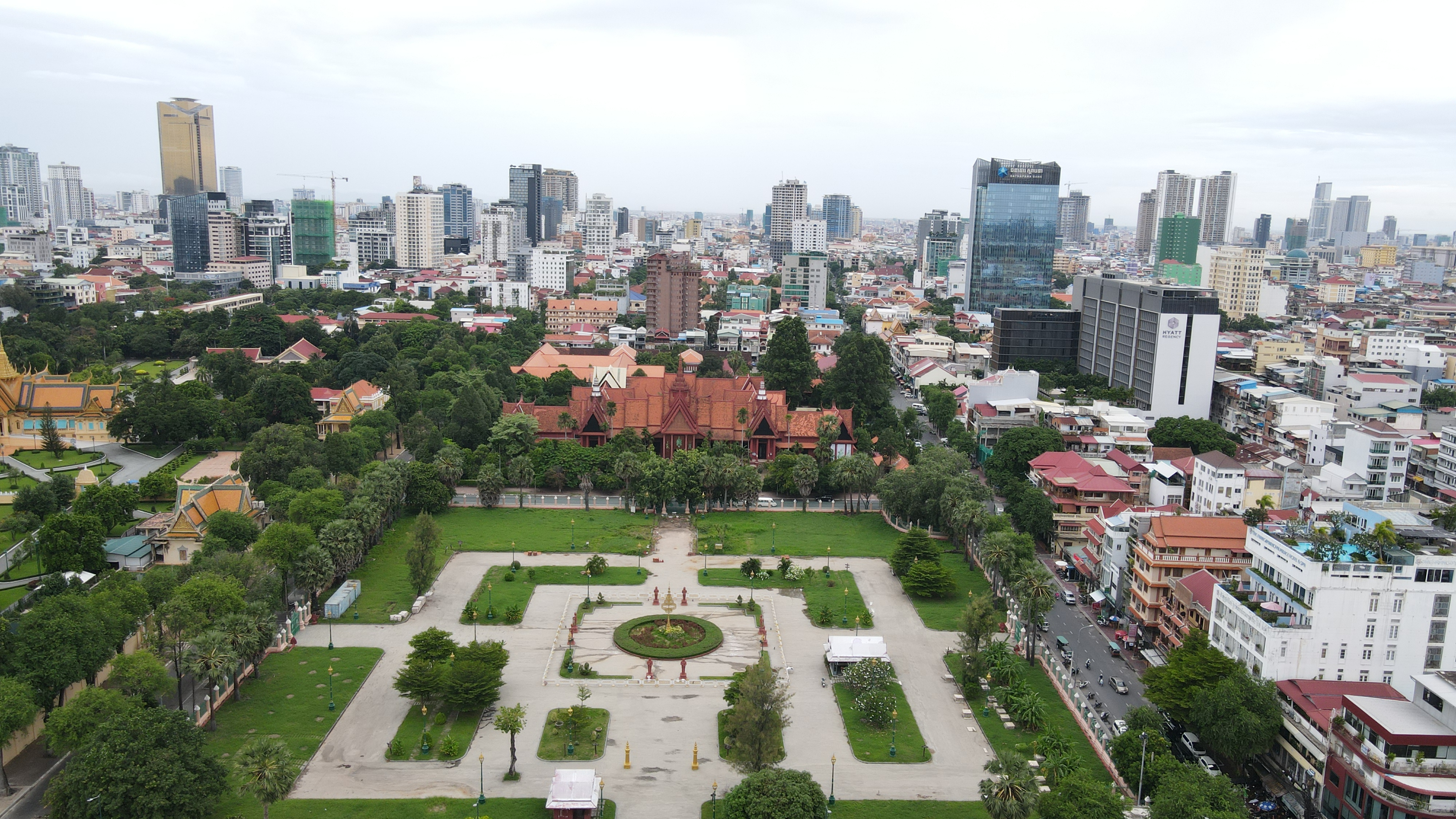
Aerial View of National Museum of Cambodia

The museum houses one of the world's largest collections of Khmer art, including sculptural, Khmer ceramics, bronzes, and ethnographic objects. Its collection includes over 14,000 items, from prehistoric times to periods before, during and after the Khmer Empire, which at its height stretched from Thailand, across present-day Cambodia, to southern Vietnam.

The National Museum of Cambodia is located on Street 10 in central Phnom Penh, to the north of the Royal Palace and on the west side of Veal Preah Man square. The visitors' entrance to the compound is at the corner of Streets 13 and 178. The Royal University of Fine Arts is located on the west side of the museum. The museum is under the authority of the Cambodian Ministry of Culture and Fine Arts. The museum buildings, inspired by Khmer temple architecture, were constructed between 1917 and 1924, the museum was officially inaugurated in 1920, and it was renovated in 1968. The museum promotes awareness, understanding and appreciation of Cambodia's culture and heritage, aiming to educate and inspire its visitors.

== History ==
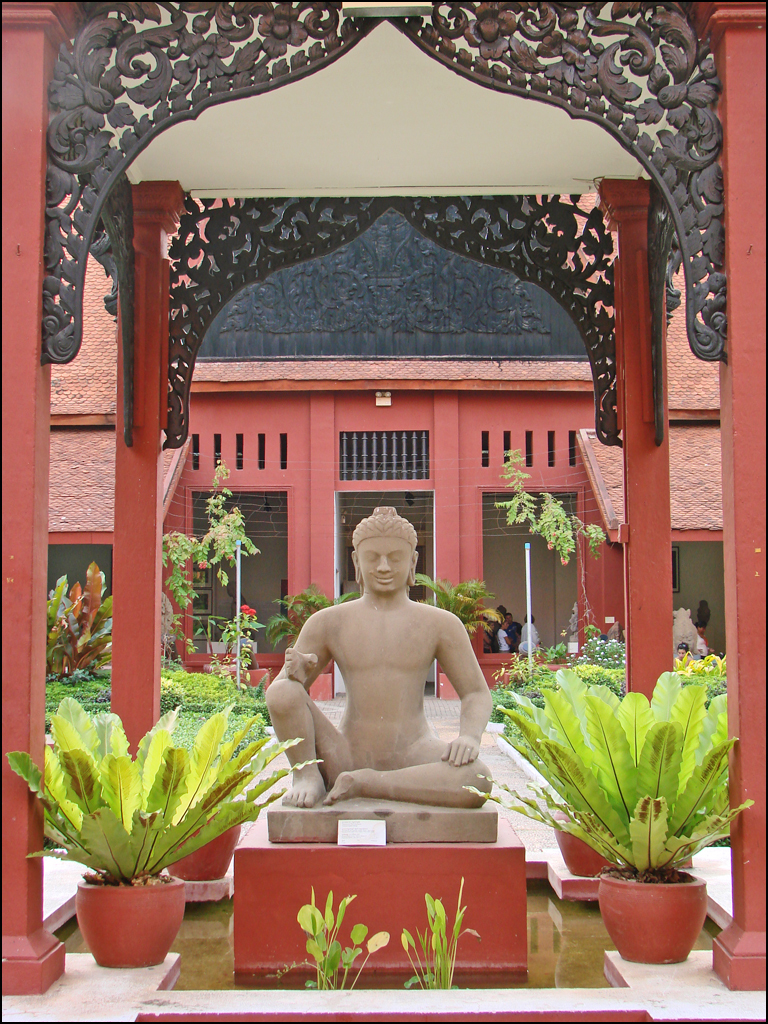
Stone statue of the Leper King

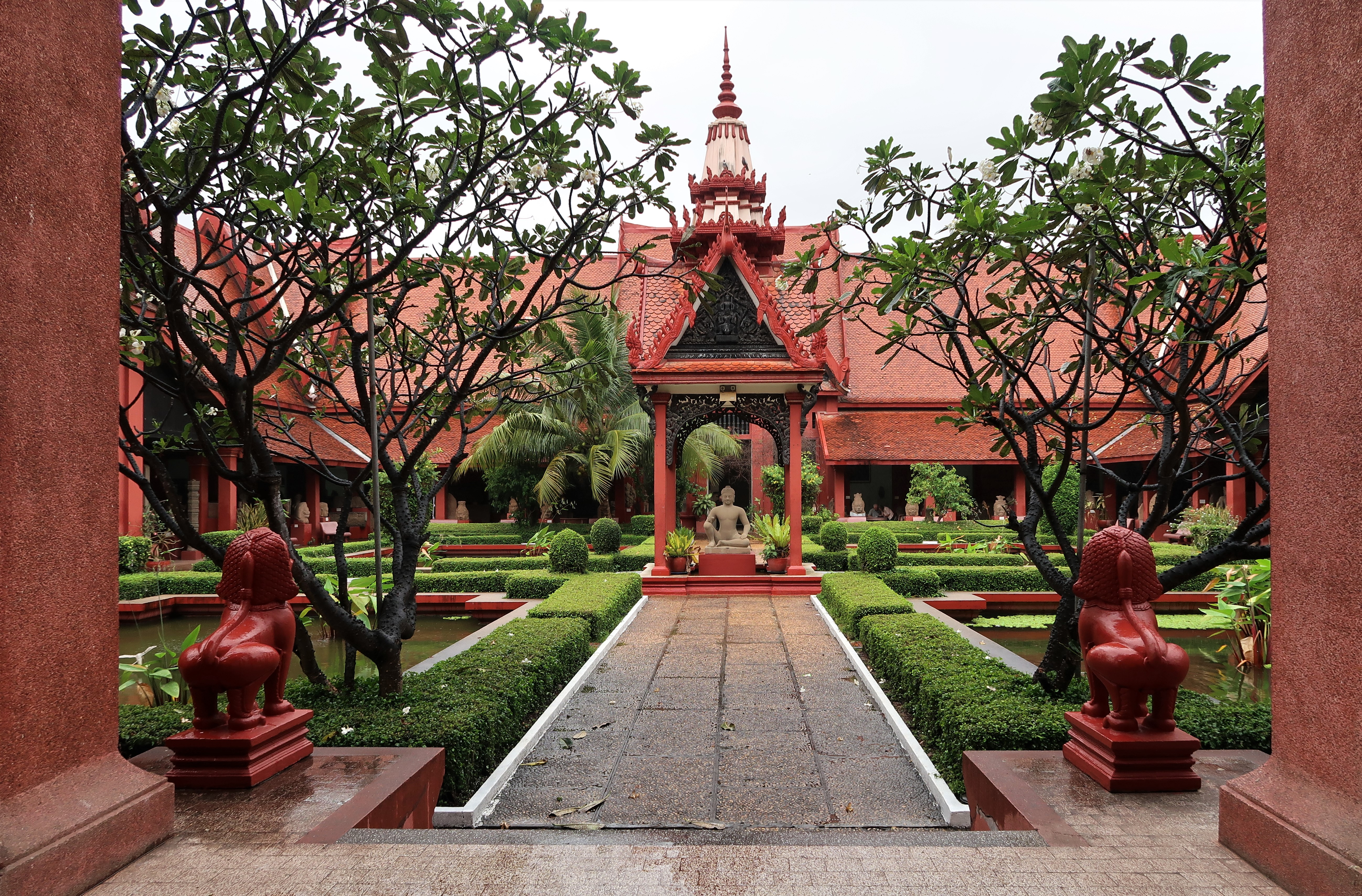
Museum courtyard

George Groslier (1887–1945), historian, curator and author was the motivating force behind much of the revival of interest in traditional Cambodian arts and crafts, and it was he who designed this building that is today ‘traditional Khmer’ architecture. It is perhaps better described as a building enlarged from Cambodian temple prototypes seen on ancient bas-reliefs and reinterpreted through colonial eyes to meet the museum-size requirements.

The foundation stone for the new museum was laid on 15 August 1917. Some two-and-a-half years later, the completed museum was inaugurated during Khmer New Year on 13 April 1920 in the presence of H.M King Sisowath, François-Marius Baudouin, Résident-supérieur, and M. Groslier, director of Cambodian Arts, and Conservator of the museum.

The original design of the building was slightly altered in 1924 with extensions that added wings at either end of the eastern façade that made the building even more imposing.

Control of the National Museum and Arts Administration was ceded by the French to the Cambodians on 9 August 1951 and following Independence in 1953, the then Musée National de Phnom Penh was the subject of bilateral accords. In 1966 Chea Thay Seng was the first Cambodian director of the museum and dean of the newly created Department of Archaeology at the Royal University of Fine Arts. This university that form its foundation as the Ecole des Arts Cambodgiens in 1920 was intimately linked with students, artisans and teachers who worked to preserve Cambodian cultural traditions, can still be found to the rear of the museum.

During the Khmer Rouge regime (from 1975 to 1979), all aspects of Cambodian life including the cultural realm were devastated. The museum, along with the rest of Phnom Penh, was evacuated and abandoned. The museum, closed between 1975 and 1979, and was found in disrepair, its roof rotten and home to a vast colony of bats, the garden overgrown, and the collection in disarray, many objects damaged or stolen. The museum was quickly tidied up and reopened to the public on 13 April 1979. However, many of the museum's employees had lost their lives during the Khmer Rouge regime.

== Collections ==
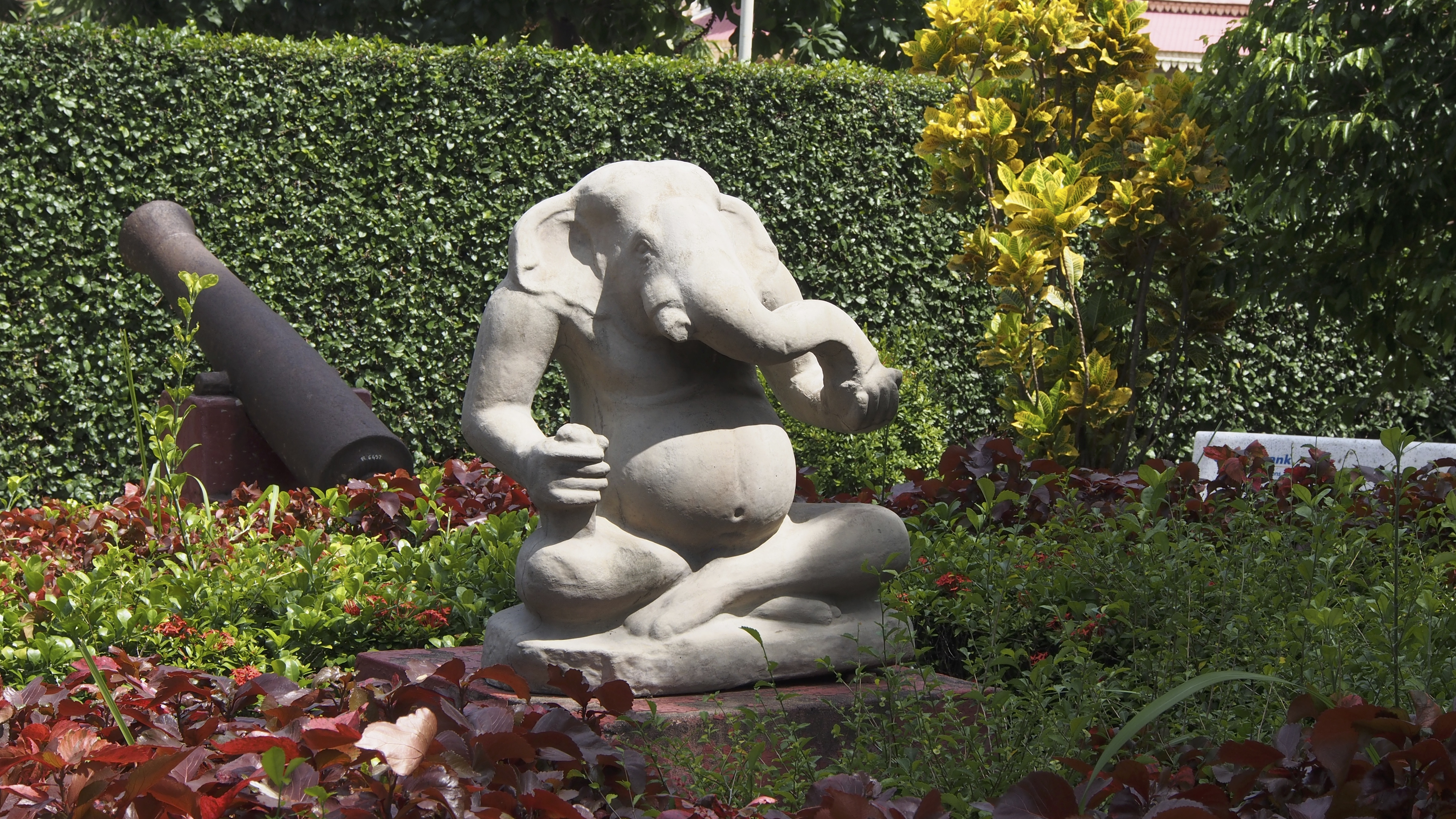
Stone statue of Ganesha

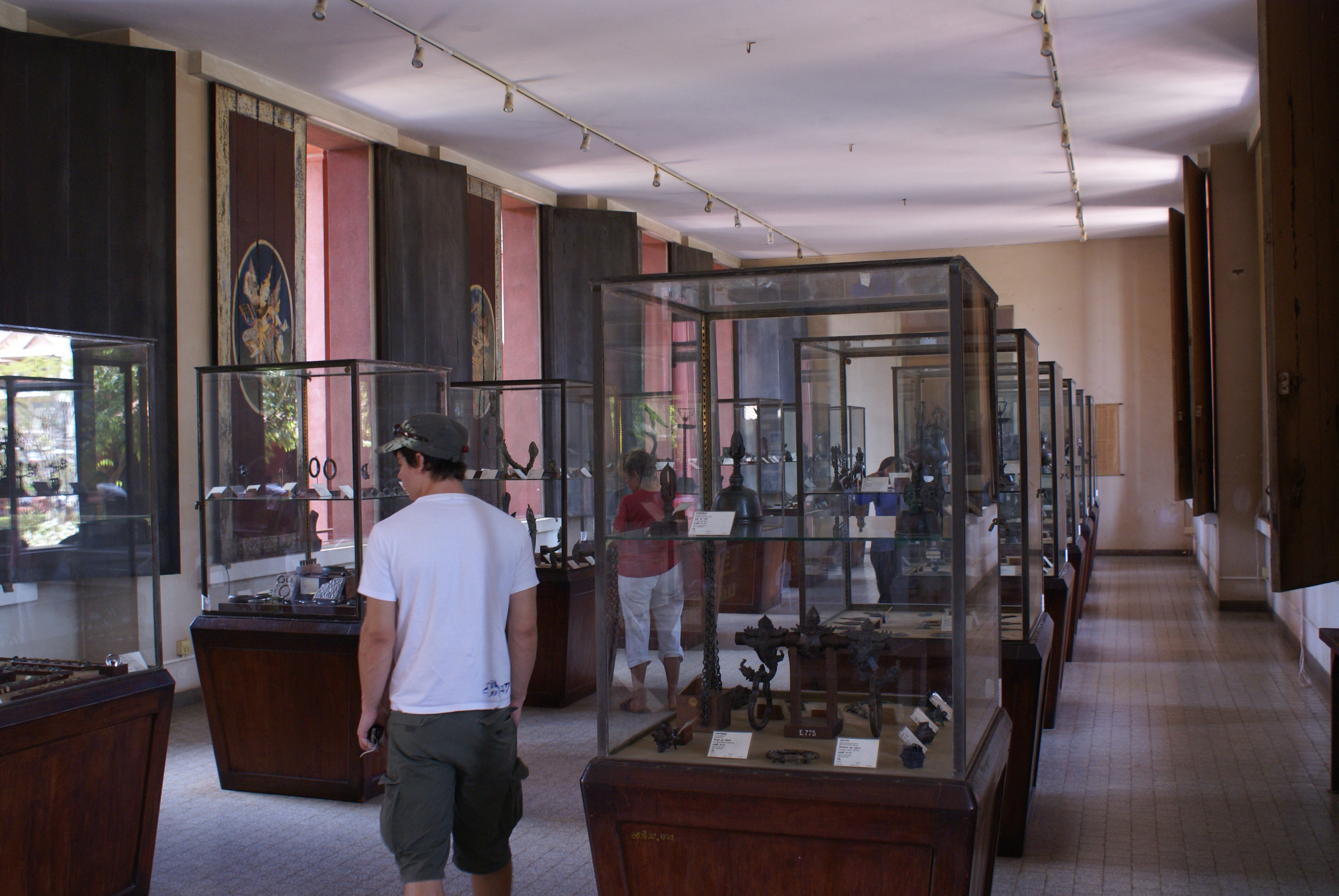
Interior of the museum

Together with the adjacent Royal University of Fine Arts and its Department of Archaeology, the National Museum of Cambodia works to enhance knowledge of and preserve Cambodian cultural traditions and to provide a source of pride and identity to the Cambodian people. The museum also serves a religious function; its collection of important Buddhist and Hindu sculpture addresses community religious needs as a place of worship. A permanent exhibition, Post-Angkorian Buddha, supported by UNESCO and a number of individuals and local businesses, opened in 2000 to extend the religious function of the museum.

Under the auspices of the Cambodian Department of Museums, the museum not only manages its own collection, staff, and premises but also supports and oversees all other state-run museums in Cambodia. Its activities are further supported by private individuals, foreign governments, and numerous philanthropic organizations. The activities of the museum include the presentation, conservation, safekeeping, interpretation, and acquisition of Cambodian cultural material, as well as the repatriation of Cambodian cultural property. Looting and illicit export of Cambodian cultural material are a continuing concern.

Outside of Cambodia, the museum promotes the understanding of Cambodian arts and culture by lending objects from its collection for major international exhibitions. This practice was in place before Cambodia's recent decades of unrest and was reinstituted in the 1990s, starting with an exhibition held at the National Gallery of Australia in 1992. Subsequent exhibitions have been held in France, the United States, Japan, South Korea, and Germany.

== Repatriation of artifacts ==
In July 2024, 14 sculptures were repatriated to Cambodia from the U.S. and were displayed at the museum. This was a welcome success for Cambodia's efforts to bring back thousands of artifacts looted or trafficked out of the country. Of those repatriated and put on display at the museum, a stone sculpture from the 10th century of the female goddess Uma from the ancient royal capital of Koh Ker, was highly anticipated. In February 2026, 74 artefacts looted from Cambodia by British art collector and dealer Douglas Latchford were formally repatriated and displayed at the museum.

== Gallery ==
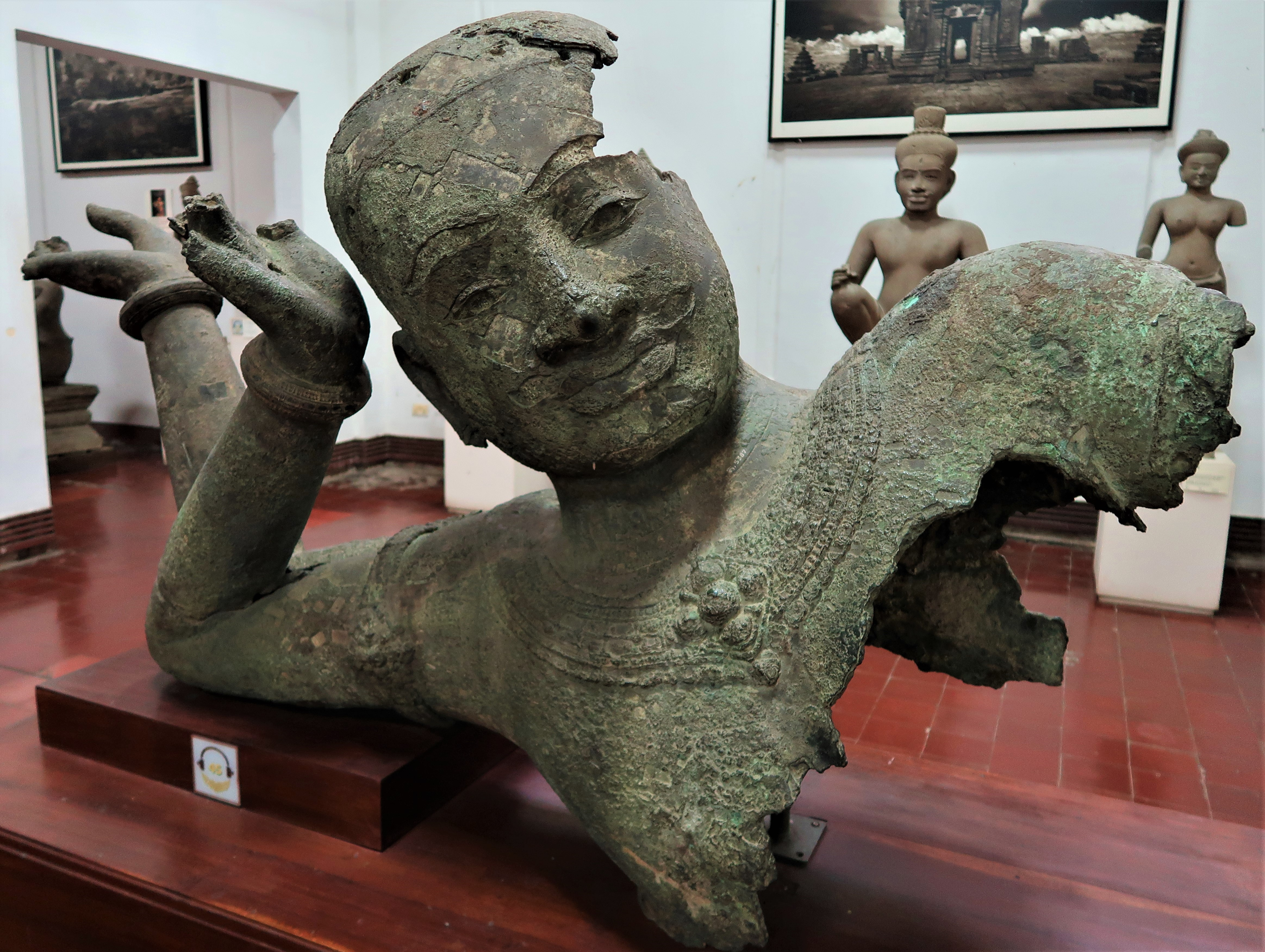
Reclining Vishnu from West Mebon, Angkor. Made of Bronze, statue is from 11th century.

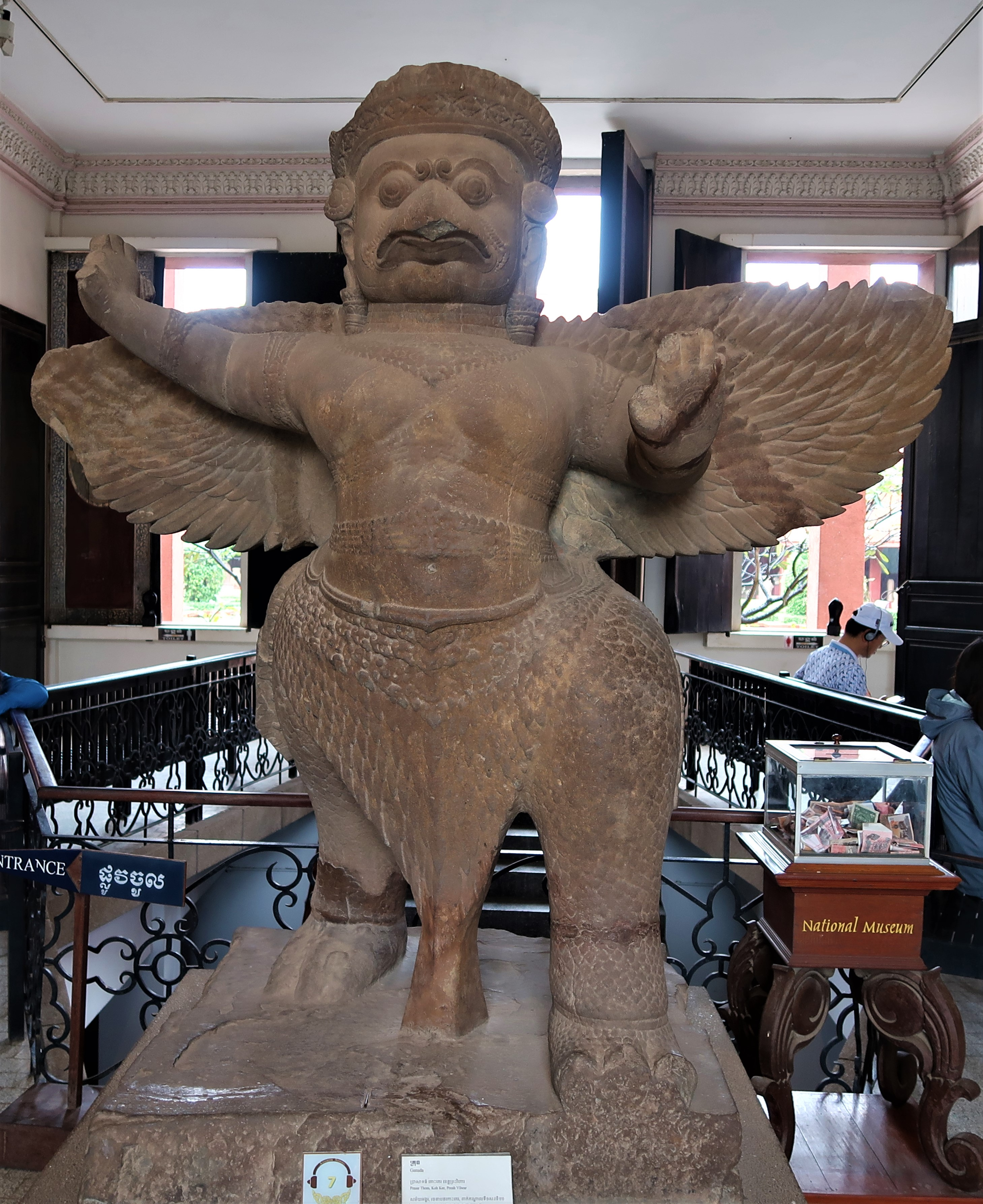
Garuda in Koh Ker style. Made of sandstone, statue is from 10th century (Angkor period).

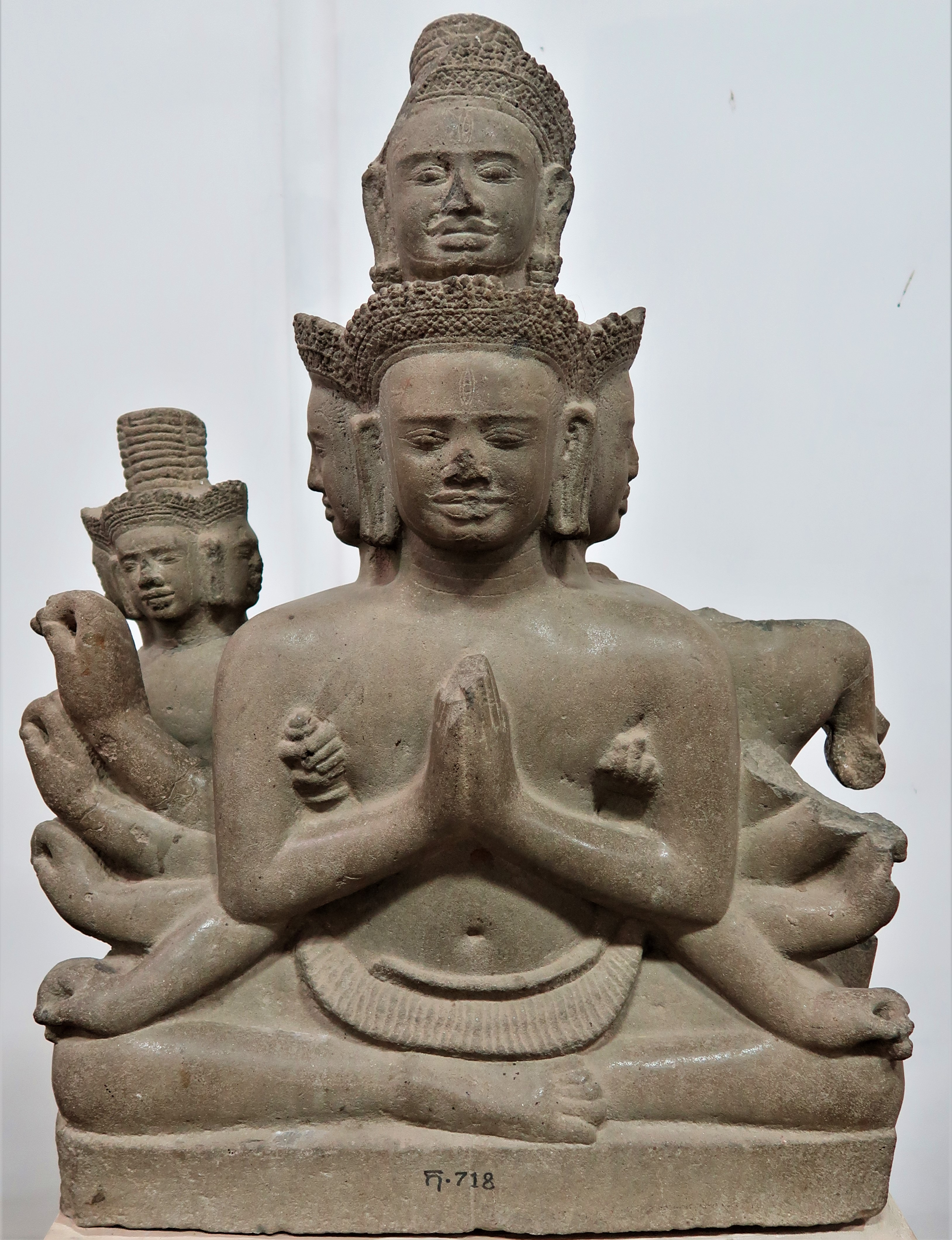
Trimurti from Angkor. Made of sandstone, statue dates back to 11th century.

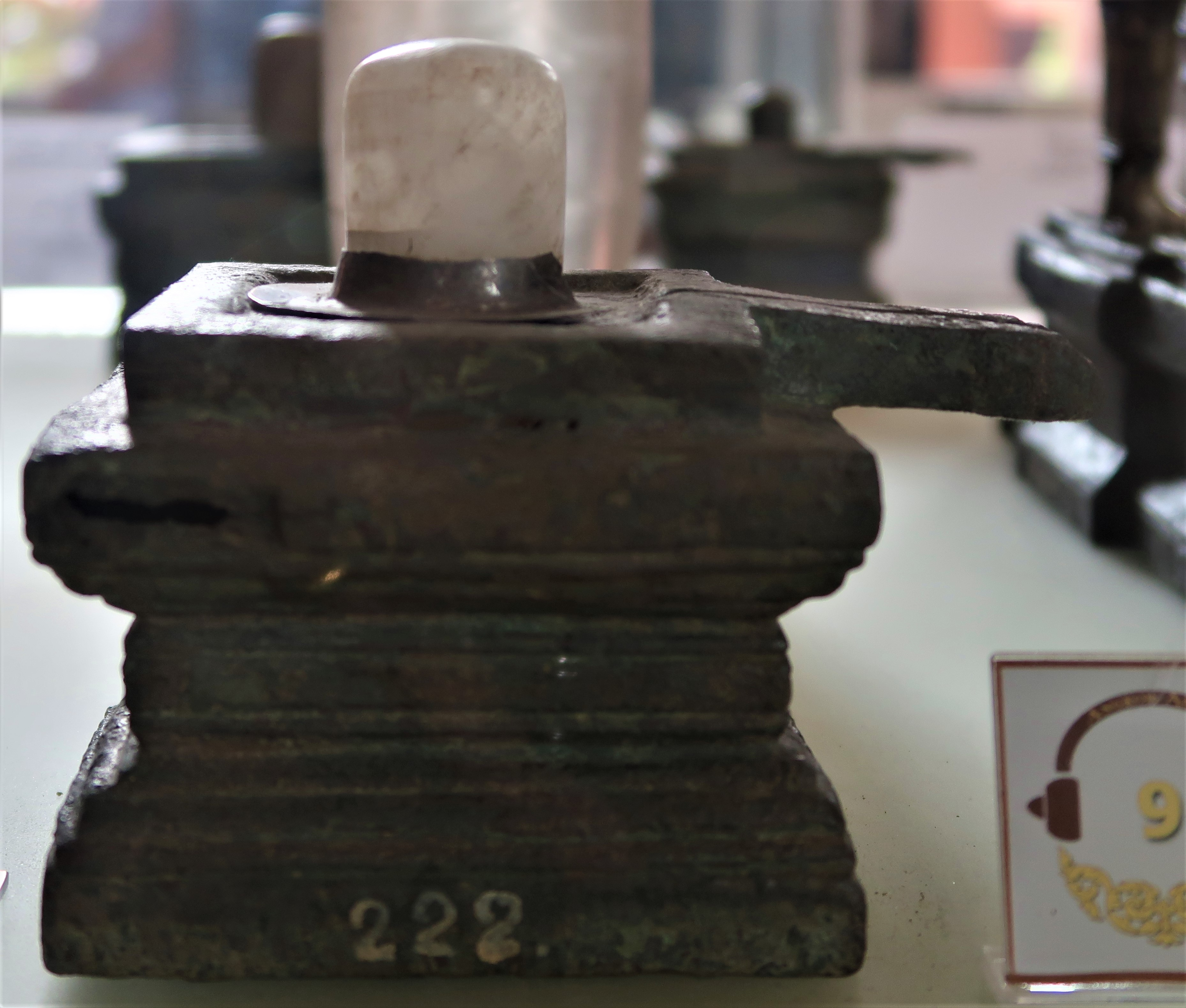
Lingam from Angkor period. Discovered in Battambang Province and is made of Bronze, Quartz & Silver.

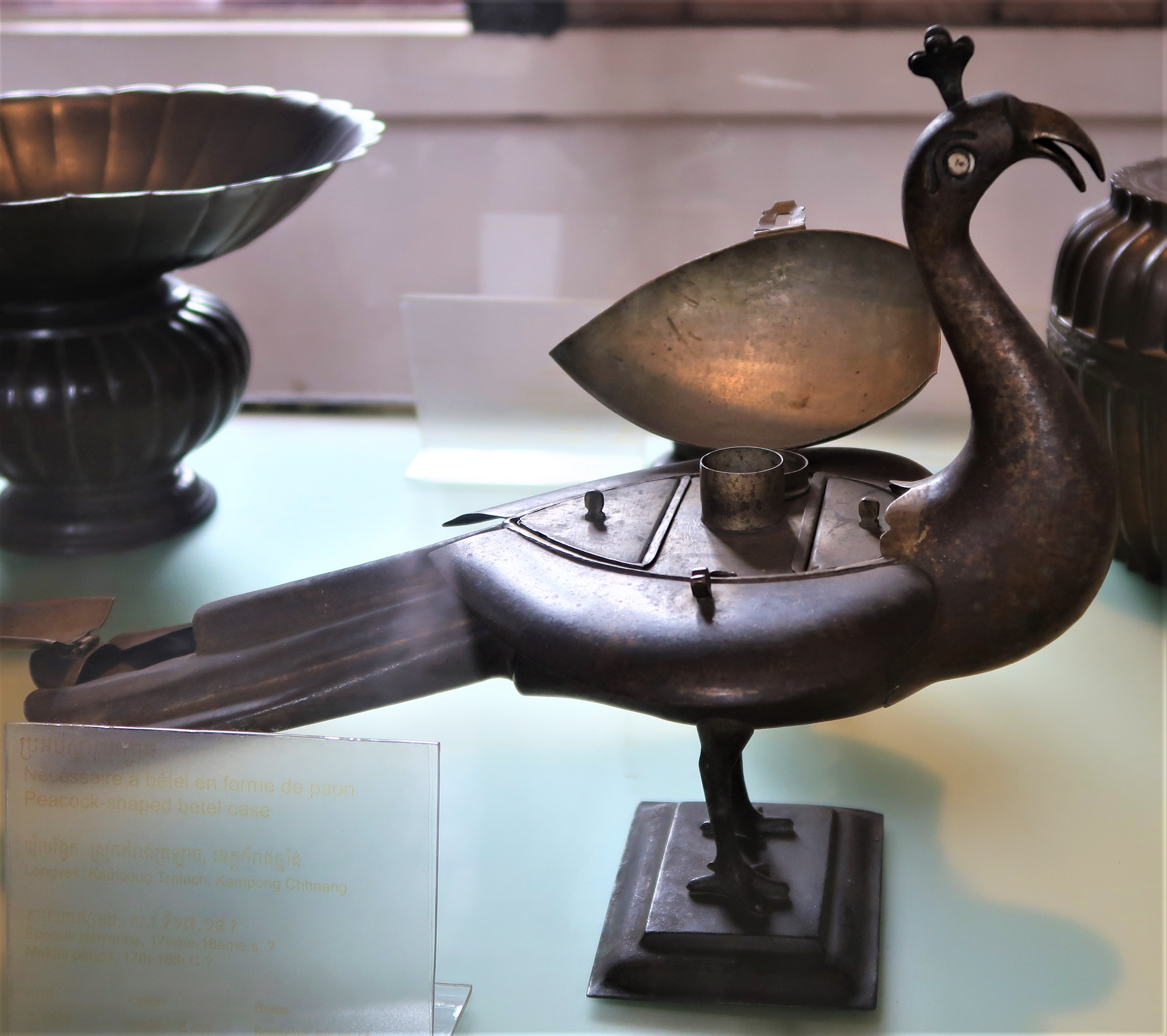
Peacock shaped Paan dan. Made of Brass, the case dates to 17th or 18th century and belongs to Longvek in Cambodia.

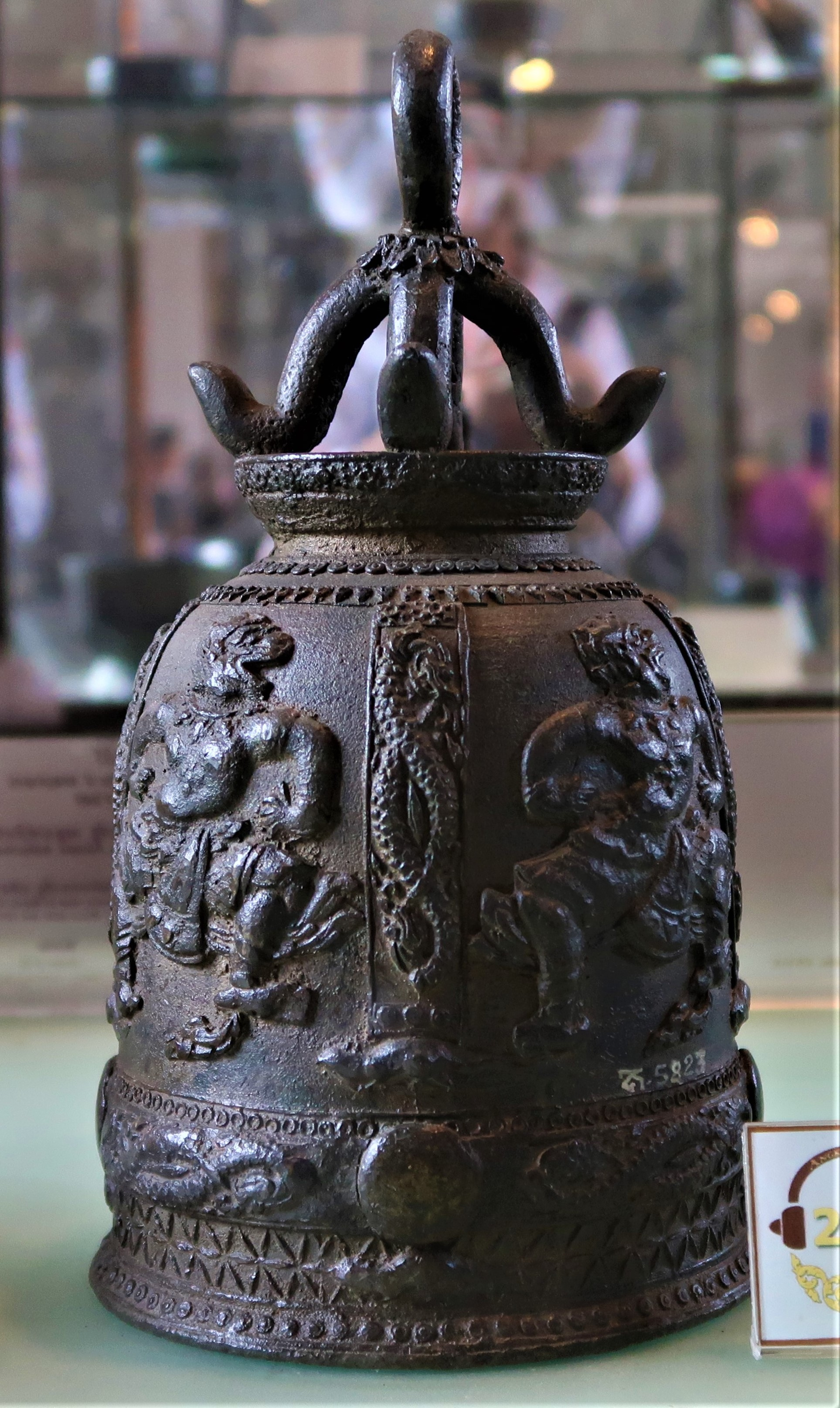
Elephant bell made of bronze from the Angkor period.

== See also ==
- Tuol Sleng Genocide Museum

== Literature ==
- Jessup, Helen Ibbitson, et al. (2006). Masterpieces of the National Museum of Cambodia. Norfolk, CT: Friends of Khmer Culture. 112 pages. ISBN 978-99950-836-0-1, ISBN 99950-836-0-4
- Khun, Samen (4th ed., revised 2013). The New Guide to the National Museum—Phnom Penh. Phnom Penh, Cambodia: Ariyathoar. 203 pages. ISBN 978-99963-799-2-5 (for availability, email: museum_cam@camnet.com.kh)
- Lenzi, Iola (2004). Museums of Southeast Asia. Singapore: Archipelago Press. p. 200. ISBN 981-4068-96-9.

== Sources ==
- Adapted, with permission, from National Museum of Cambodia
