= Royal University of Fine Arts =

University in Phnom Penh, Cambodia

Coordinates: 11.5651°N 104.9281°E

- សាកលវិទ្យាល័យភូមិន្ទវិចិត្រសិល្បៈ (Khmer); Université royale des beaux-arts (French)
- Former names: École d'arts cambodgienne
- Type: National
- Established: 14 December 1917; 108 years ago
- Affiliations: Agence universitaire de la Francophonie; Ministry of Culture and Fine Arts
- Rector: Heng Sophady
- Location: 72 Preah Ang Yukunthor St., Phnom Penh, Cambodia
- Nickname: RUFA; សាលារចនា Sālā Racanā
- Website: www.rufa.edu.kh

The Royal University of Fine Arts (RUFA; Khmer: សាកលវិទ្យាល័យភូមិន្ទវិចិត្រសិល្បៈ, ALA-LC: Sākalavidyālăy Bhūmind Vicitr Silpà; French: Université royale des beaux-arts) is a university in Chey Chumneas, Phnom Penh specialising in architecture and fine arts. It is the oldest university in Cambodia, having been in existence since 1917.

The establishment of the Royal University of Fine Arts dates back to 1917. At the time, the Khmer Arts School was established inside the Royal Palace. Later, because the courtyard inside the Royal Palace was too small, King Sisowath tasked the French artist George Groslier, as well as seven other Cambodian artists, with establishing a new Fine Arts School situated at the present-day site of the Royal University of Fine Arts. In 1965, the Fine Arts School was transformed into the Royal University of Fine Arts, which had five faculties: Faculty of Choreographic Arts, which was expanded from the national dance group; Faculty of Music, expanded from the musical school; and the Faculty of Plastic Arts, expanded from the Khmer Arts School or Fine Arts School. At the same time, two new faculties were established: Faculty of Archaeology, and the Faculty of Architecture and Urbanization.

The university operated until April 1975, when it closed as the country fell to the Khmer Rouge regime.

In October 1988, the Cambodian government issued the sub-decree to re-open the university as the University of Fine Arts. Then, the university was renamed the Royal University of Fine Arts in the sub-decree in October 1996.

== Dance ==
The Cambodian fishing dance performance was composed in the 1960s at the Royal University of Fine Arts in Phnom Penh. It involves male dancers and female dancers. The dance is set in a rural setting where the dancers have rattan baskets and scoops.

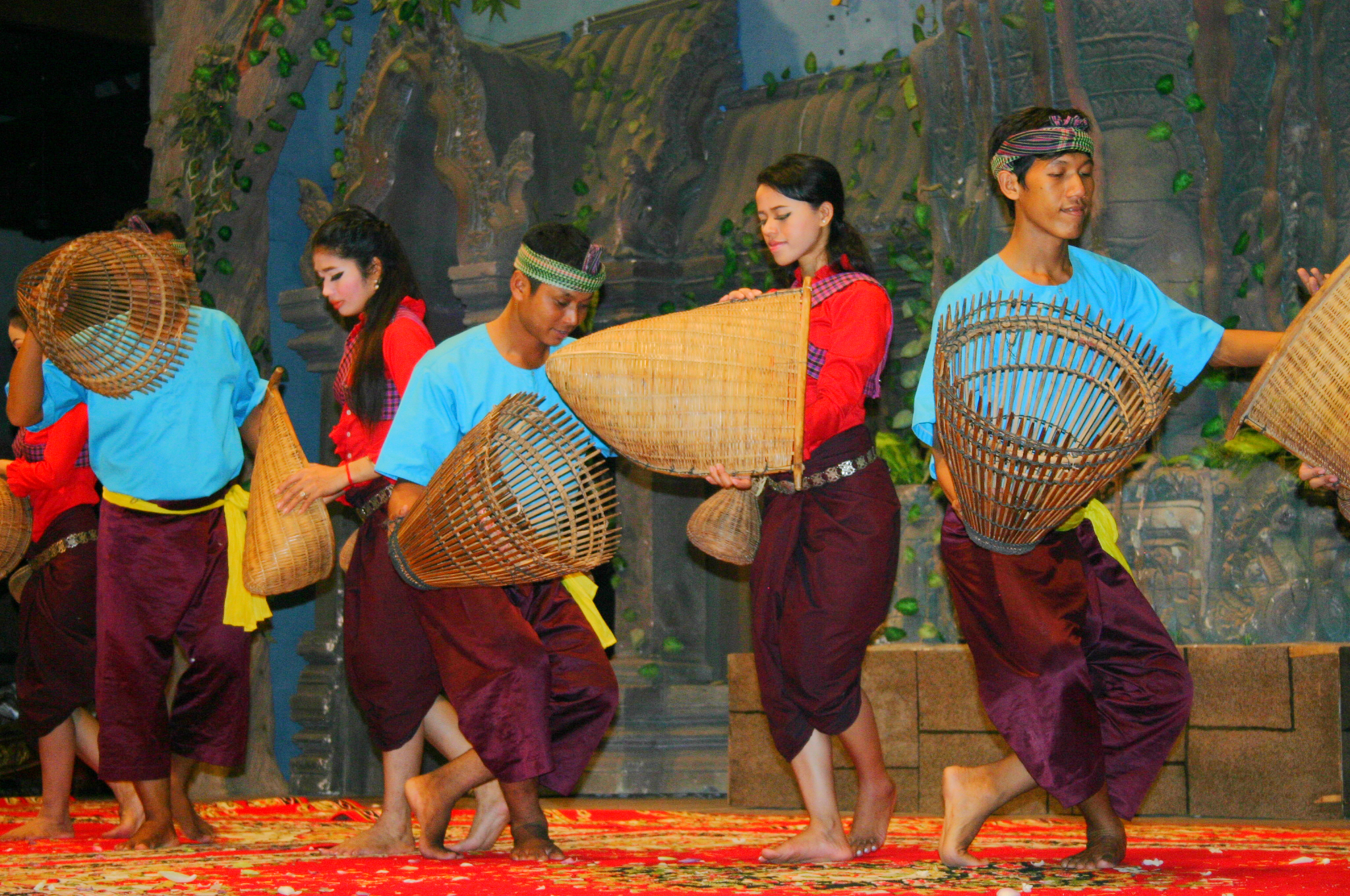
Cambodian fishing dance that was developed at the Royal University of Fine Arts

== Faculties ==
- Department of Foundation Year
- Faculty of Archaeology
- Faculty of Architecture and Urbanism
- Faculty of Choreographic Arts
- Faculty of Music
- Faculty of Plastic Arts

== Alumni ==
- Charya Burt - dancer, choreographer, vocalist, and teacher of Khmer classical dance
- Nuon Kan - writer, composer, and professor of music and performing arts
- Aok Sokunkanha - actress, singer

== See also ==
- National Circus School of Cambodia
