= San Francisco Community Music Center =

- San Francisco, California; United States

Information
- Type: Music
- Established: 1921; 105 years ago
- Founder: Gertrude Field
- Executive Director: Julie Rulyak Steinberg
- Gender: All
- Age range: All
- Website: sfcmc.org

The San Francisco Community Music Center is a nonprofit music school located in San Francisco, California, US. The CMC is the oldest community arts organization in the San Francisco Bay Area. The school's stated mission is to make "high quality music accessible to people of all ages, backgrounds and abilities, regardless of financial means."

== History ==
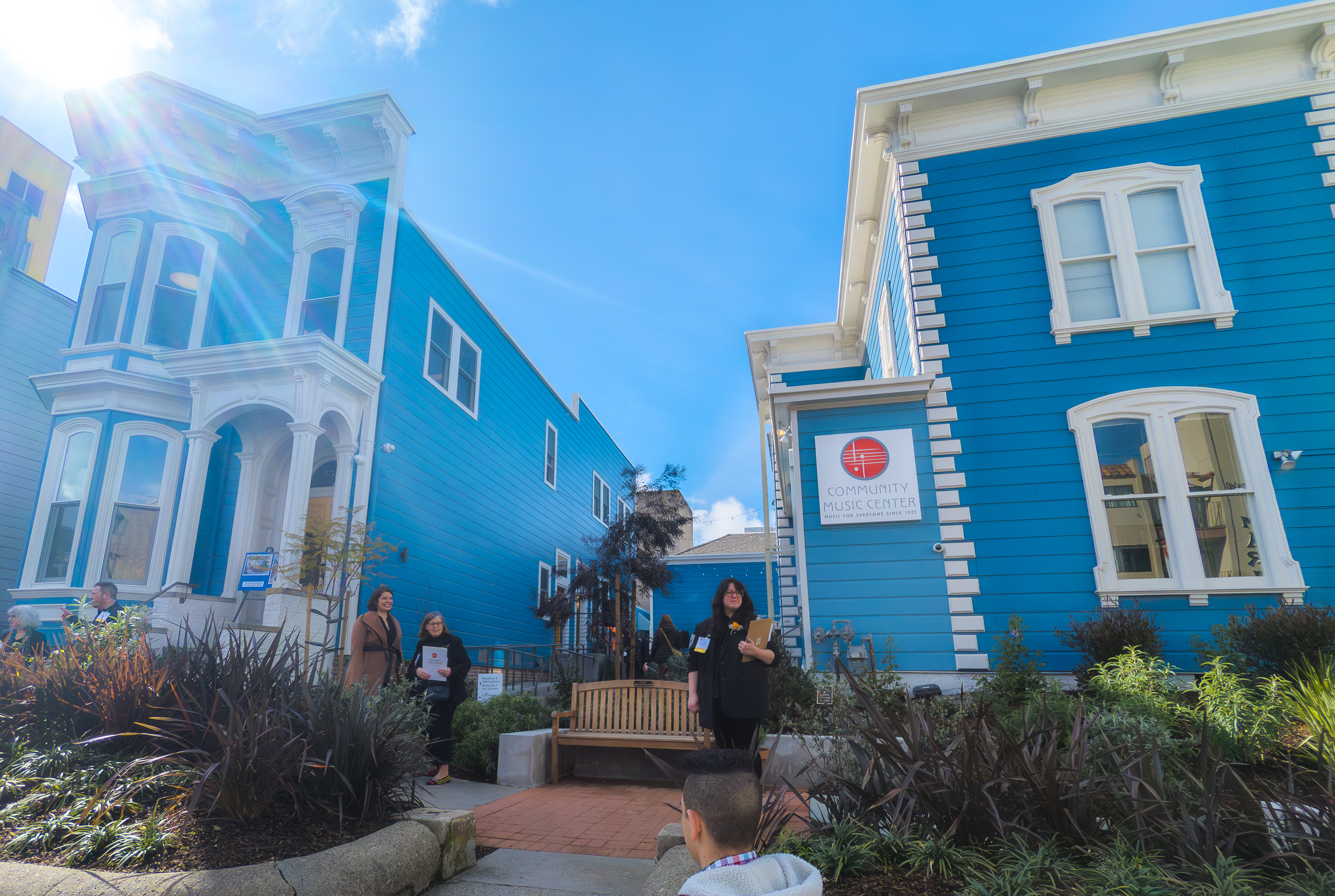
The CMC on the day of the ribbon cutting ceremony for the new expansion building, February 2024.

The Community Music Center was founded in 1921 by Gertrude Field, evolving from her Dolores Street Girls Club. The main branch has remained in the same building in San Francisco's Mission District since the founding of the school.

In 1983, the CMC opened a second branch in San Francisco's Richmond District.

In 2012, the CMC purchased the property next door to the school's main building in the Mission District, in order to provide ADA-compliant accessibility and double the number of students. In November 2019, the San Francisco Planning Commission approved the plans for this expansion.

In December 2019, the CMC was added to the city's Legacy Business Registry, in recognition of the school's decades of service to the community.

In February 2022, its centennial year, the CMC held a groundbreaking for their Mission District expansion. The newly completed expansion was opened to the public in January 2024, and a grand opening ceremony was held the following month.

== Programs, staff, and faculty ==
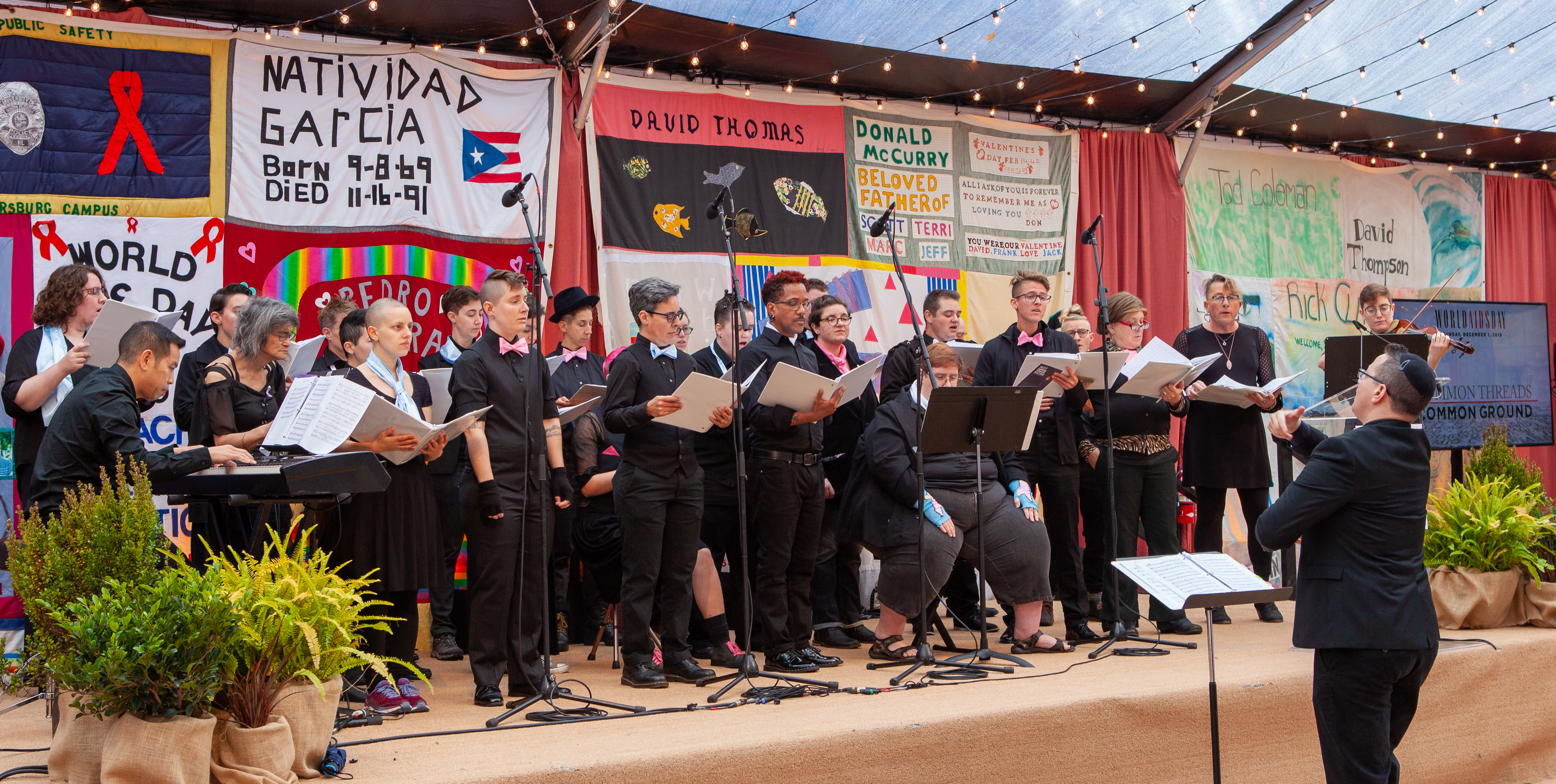
The New Voices Bay Area TIGQ chorus performs at the National AIDS Memorial on World AIDS Day 2019.

Julie Rulyak Steinberg serves as the Community Music Center's executive director. Sylvia Sherman is the program director.

The CMC serves over 3100 students annually. Private lessons and group classes in voice, instruments, composition, and music theory are offered, with tuition assistance available on a sliding scale.

The CMC hosts several tuition-free programs, including choirs for adults aged 55 and older, the Mission District Young Musicians Program for students aged 13 to 18, a Black Music Studies program, led by Maestro Curtis and Nola Curtis, and the New Voices Bay Area TIGQ Chorus, a mixed voice choral ensemble for transgender, intersex, and genderqueer singers, led by Reuben Zellman. Former ambassador and philanthropist James Hormel was one of the first donors to help fund the New Voices chorus.

== Notable guests and alumni ==
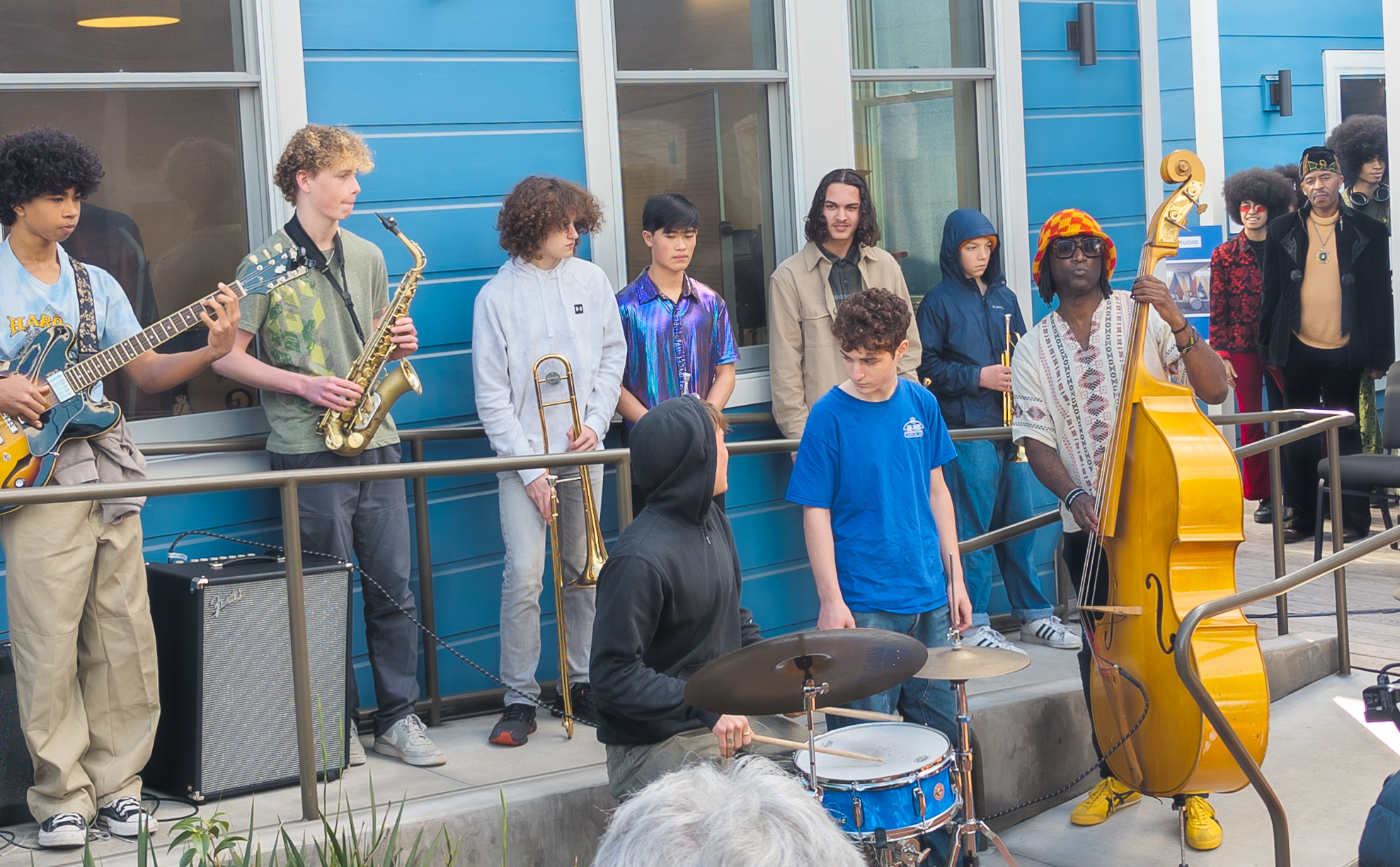
Marcus Shelby performs with the CMC Teen Jazz Orchestra in the school courtyard.

Notable guest performers and instructors at the school have included Emanuel Ax, Jascha Heifetz, Max Roach, and Marcus Shelby.

Notable alumni include singers Johnny Mathis and Lucine Amara.
