= Marcus Shelby =

- Born: February 2, 1966 (age 60)
- Origin: Anchorage, Alaska, US
- Genre: Jazz
- Occupations: Musician, composer, bandleader, educator
- Instrument: Bass
- Years active: 1990–present
- Label: Noir Records
- Website: www.marcusshelby.com

Marcus Shelby (born February 2, 1966, in Anchorage, Alaska) is an American bass player, composer and educator best known for his major works for jazz orchestra, Port Chicago, Harriet Tubman, Soul of the Movement: Meditations on Dr. Martin Luther King Jr., and Beyond the Blues: A Prison Oratorio. He has led the Marcus Shelby Jazz Orchestra since 2001 and has recorded with artists as diverse as Ledisi and Tom Waits.

He has contributed numerous musical compositions to works created in collaboration with dance ensembles and theater artists ranging from California Shakespeare Theater to Intersection for the Arts.

== Background ==
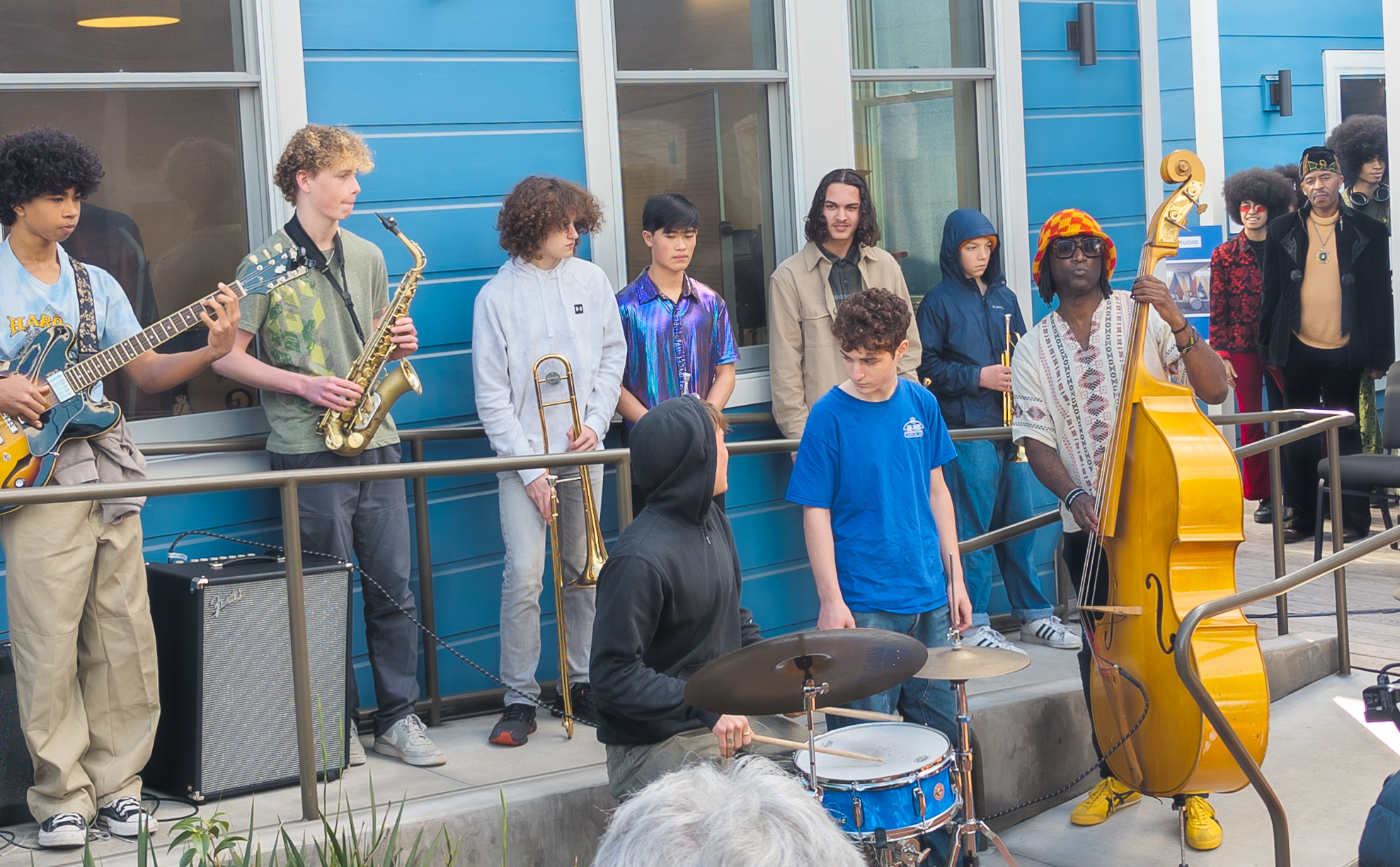
Marcus Shelby performs with the Teen Jazz Orchestra in the courtyard of the San Francisco Community Music Center.

When Shelby was five, his family moved from Memphis, Tennessee, to Sacramento, California. Shelby played double bass briefly as a teen. He studied electrical engineering at Cal Poly San Luis Obispo, and worked briefly at the Jet Propulsion Laboratory in Los Angeles.

In 1988, Shelby attended a Wynton Marsalis concert with his father, which inspired him to rededicate himself to music. Shelby moved to Los Angeles and began working with drummer Billy Higgins. After winning the Charles Mingus Scholarship in 1991 he studied music at California Institute of the Arts with Higgins, composer James Newton, and Charlie Haden.

From 1991 to 1996, Shelby recorded and toured with Black/Note (credited as Mark Shelby), a hard bop group based in Los Angeles.

When Black/Note broke up in 1996, he moved to San Francisco because he "had seen groups like Broun Fellinis" whose tenor saxophonist of the time, David Boyce, "was playing a totally different style", and he felt a need to grow. There he founded the Marcus Shelby Trio and the Marcus Shelby Jazz Orchestra. He has served as Artist in Residence at Yerba Buena Gardens Festival and Composer in Residence at Intersection for the Arts.

In 2013, Shelby was appointed to the San Francisco Arts Commission.

Shelby is a long-time faculty member at the San Francisco Community Music Center.

Shelby has two daughters.

== Major works ==
- 2002: Port Chicago, 14-movement suite for jazz orchestra
- 2007: Harriet Tubman, oratorio for voice and jazz orchestra
- 2011: Soul of the Movement: Meditations on Dr. Martin Luther King Jr.
- 2015: Beyond the Blues: A Prison Oratorio

== Discography ==
=== With Black/Note ===
- 1991: 43rd & Degnan (World Stage)
- 1994: Jungle Music (Columbia / Sony Music Distribution)
- 1994: L.A. Underground (RED Distribution)
- 1996: Nothin' But the Swing (Impulse! / GRP)

=== As leader ===
- 1997: Un Faux Pas!, Marcus Shelby Trio (Noir)
- 1998: Midtown Sunset, Marcus Shelby and the Jazzantiqua Music Ensemble (Noir)
- 1998: Sophisticate, Marcus Shelby Trio (Noir)
- 2001: The Lights Suite, Marcus Shelby Jazz Orchestra (Noir)
- 2006: Port Chicago, Marcus Shelby Jazz Orchestra (Noir)
- 2008: Harriet Tubman, Marcus Shelby Jazz Orchestra (Noir)
- 2011: Soul of the Movement: Meditations on Dr. Martin Luther King Jr., Marcus Shelby Jazz Orchestra (Porto Franco)

=== As sideman/contributor ===
- 1994: Judgement, Robert Stewart
- 1996: The Flow, Faye Carol
- 1998: Mortyfied, New Morty Show
- 1998: Intimate Strangers, Marcus Poston
- 2004: Too Good to Be True, Buford Powers
- 2005: First Pitch Swinging, Danny Grewen
- 2006: It's a Good Thing, Jamie Davis
- 2006: Blue Divine, Tammy Hall
- 2007: The Shotgun Wedding Quintet, The Shotgun Wedding Quintet
- 2007: The Code, John Calloway
- 2007: 12 Gates to the City, Howard Wiley
- 2008: Faye Sings Lady Day (Live at Yoshi's) Faye Carol
- 2008: Extraordinary Rendition, Rupa & the April Fishes
- 2010: On a Day Like This..., Meklit Hadero
- 2011: Bad as Me, Tom Waits
- 2014: Faye Sings Lady Day Volume 2 (Live at Yoshi's) Faye Carol

== Select collaborations ==
- 1993–2006 Musical Director, Jazz Antiqua Music and Dance Ensemble
- 1998–2004: Savage Jazz Dance Company, Musical Director
- 2014: The Legacy of Duke Ellington: 50 Years of Swing! with California Shakespeare Theater
- 2015: Notes from the Field: Doing Time in Education, The California Chapter with Anna Deavere Smith

== Awards, honors, and commissions ==
- 1991: Charles Mingus Scholarship
- 2000: Meet the Composer residency
- 2000: Creative Work Fund commission
- 2003: Equal Justice Society commission
- 2005: Oakland Ballet commission
- 2006: Fellow, Resident Dialogues Program of the Committee for Black Performing Arts, Stanford University
- 2008: Bay Area Theater Critics Circle Award, Best Original Music Score, Sonny's Blues
- 2009: Black Metropolis Research Consortium Fellowship
