= Faye Carol =

- Born: Meridian, Mississippi, U.S.
- Genres: Jazz, blues, R&B, gospel
- Occupations: Singer, Educator
- Years active: 1960s–present
- Labels: Getdown Records, Gamble Girls Records, World Stage Records, Lily Records, Hit Records
- Website: fayecarol.com

Faye Carol is an American singer in the tradition of jazz, blues, gospel and R&B, known as the Dynamic Miss Faye Carol.

== Early life ==
Carol was born in Meridian, Mississippi. After moving with her family to Pittsburg, California, she participated in youth choir at the Solomon Temple Missionary Baptist Church and toured nationally with the gospel group The Angelaires. She gained early experience as a vocalist working with pianist Martha Young, niece to jazz saxophonist Lester Young, and was mentored by her soon-to-be husband, musician, composer, and educator Jim Gamble.

== Biography ==
After winning a talent contest at the Oakland Auditorium, Faye Carol began her professional career performing with the Oakland funk pioneers Johnny Talbot & De Thangs. She won Top Star Awards 'Best Singer' in 1968 and performed at local venues in the mid-1960s. She released her first single Good Man/Lies in 1967 on Hit Records. She worked with local musicians Eddie Foster, Ed Kelly, Richie Goldberg, Johnny Heartsman, and Claude High as well as more famous artists such as Earl Hines, Vi Redd, and Charles Brown. She founded her own group, Mzizi, performing at the UC Berkeley Jazz Festival. During the late 1960s and early 1970s, she worked for Bill Graham performing with Johnny Talbot & De Thangs at The Fillmore and Winterland Ballroom, opening for Otis Redding, James Brown, Martha and the Vandellas, Grateful Dead, and Jefferson Airplane. She sang at Free Angela Davis and Black Panther Party rallies in Oakland.

During the 1970s she performed in San Francisco's jazz and cabaret scenes, including lengthy stints at Fanny's, The Caracole, and the Alta Plaza. Carol was awarded the Cabaret Gold Awards in 1978, 1983, and 1984. In 1977, she toured the West Coast with Marvin Gaye, Melba Moore, and L.T.D.. She released her albums Classic Caroling in 1982 and Alive at the Great American Music Hall in 1985.

Carol soon became known as a Betty Carter or Art Blakey of the West Coast, with her band serving as a school and training ground for many of the most renowned musicians to emerge from the Bay Area including Benny Green, Glen Pearson, Dayna Stephens, Darrell Green, Marcus Shelby, Howard Wiley, and her daughter, Kito Kamili.

In 1990, Carol performed with the Bay Area Jazz All-Stars at the Oakland Coliseum for the For a Free South Africa musical celebration of Nelson Mandela's first visit to the Bay Area, alongside John Handy, Bobby Hutcherson, Ed Kelly, Troy Lampkins, Pharoah Sanders, and E.W. Wainwright. In 1990 she released The Dynamic Miss Faye Carol and in 1996, she released The Flow with the Kito Gamble Trio, featuring Billy Higgins.

In 1998 Faye Carol founded Music in the Community, an after school music program for youth at Black Repertory Theater in Berkeley, California continuing until 2014. She has additionally been on music faculty at Oakland School for the Arts, East Bay Institute for Urban Arts, Jazz Camp West, Blues In the Schools, and Jam Camp West. Her vocal proteges include Ledisi and Kehlani. In 2000, she founded the organization School of the Getdown, with the mission to celebrate and promote Black music and share these cultural traditions with diverse Bay Area communities, with particular attention towards youth and the Black community. The School of the Getdown offers vocal workshops, annual Black History Month lecture-performances in local schools, an after school youth arts program, an annual summer Youth Arts Camp, and presents concerts, festivals, and commissioned artistic works including the annual Black Women's Roots Festival.

In 2008 she released Faye Sings Lady Day (Live at Yoshi's), and in 2009 she released Carolizing Christmas, followed by Faye Sings Lady Day Volume 2 (Live at Yoshi's) in 2014. She appeared in the 2017 documentary film Evolutionary Blues: West Oakland's Music Legacy. Forever Dynamic, a double CD featuring Dennis Chambers, Tarus Mateen, and Joe Warner, was released on Getdown Records in April 2026. Faye Sings The Blues, a double CD featuring Taj Mahal (musician), Gerald Albright, Kirk Whalum, Robert Randolph, Eric Gales, Jubu Smith, Wycliffe Gordon, James Carter (musician), Russell Gunn, Jon Faddis, Nicholas Payton, and Tia Fuller, was released on Getdown Records in August 2026. A Soulful Christmas, a double CD featuring Gerald Albright, Juan Escovedo, Wycliffe Gordon, David Jackson, Jules Broussard, Steve Nelson (vibraphonist), Dayna Stephens, Tia Nomore, and James Carter (musician), will be released on Getdown Records in December 2026.

== Discography ==
=== As a Leader ===
Year	Title	Label
1967	Good Man/Lies	Hit Records
1980	Live At The Alta Plaza	Gamble Girls Records
1982	Classic Caroling	Lily Records
1985	Alive at the Great American Music Hall	Lily Records
1990	The Dynamic Miss Faye Carol	Gamble Girls Records
1996	The Flow (with Kito Gamble Trio)	World Stage Records
2008	Faye Sings Lady Day (Live at Yoshi's)	Gamble Girls Records
2009	Carolizing Christmas	Gamble Girls Records
2014	Faye Sings Lady Day Volume 2 (Live At Yoshi's)	Gamble Girls Records
2026	Forever Dynamic	Getdown Records
2026	Faye Sings The Blues	Getdown Records
2026	A Soulful Christmas	Getdown Records

=== As a Contributor ===
Year	Title	Lead Artist	Label
1992	De Thang	Johnny Tolbert & De Thang	Oakland Rhythm & Blues Op'ry
1994	Dr. B	Bernard Anderson	Old Ass G Entertainment
1995	Skin Talk	Carolyn Brandy	Skin Talk Music
2002	Tin Roof Blues	Mal Sharpe's Big Money in Jazz Band	Mal Sharpe
2005	Represent	Sista Kee	Gamble Girls Records
2007	The Angola Project	Howard Wiley	Howard Wiley
2008	Harriet Tubman: Bound for the Promised Land	Marcus Shelby Orchestra	Noir Records
2008	Firecracker Baby	Mal Sharpe's Big Money in Jazz Band	Mal Sharpe
2011	Soul of the Movement: Meditations Dr. Martin Luther King Jr.	Marcus Shelby Orchestra	Porto Franco Records
2010	12 Gates to the City	Howard Wiley	Howard Wiley
2016	Velvet Bone	Johnny Talbot & De Thangs	Oakland Rhythm & Blues Op'ry
