= Chey Chumneas =

Chey Chumneas ជ័យជំនះ
- Quarter
- Interactive map of Chey Chumneas
- Country: Cambodia
- Province: Phnom Penh
- Section: Daun Penh
- Time zone: UTC+07:00 (ICT)

Chey Chumneas (Khmer: ជ័យជំនះ ; lit. 'Victorious') is a quarter (sangkat) in Doun Penh section, Phnom Penh, Cambodia. It includes the Royal University of Fine Arts, the National Museum, the Royal Palace, and the Silver Pagoda.

== Education ==
As of 2008 no international schools are in Chey Chumneas. Melanie Brew of the Phnom Penh Post stated that international schools in proximity include the British International School of Phnom Penh, iCAN British International School, the International School of Phnom Penh, and the Paragon International School high school.
