= Lucine Amara =

American soprano (1925–2024)

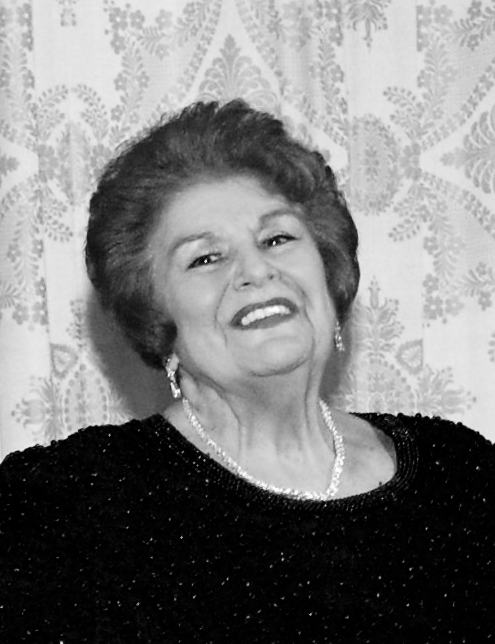
- Born: Lucine Tockqui Armaganian; March 1, 1925; Hartford, Connecticut, U.S.
- Died: September 6, 2024 (aged 99); New York City, U.S.
- Education: University of Southern California; San Francisco Community Music Center
- Occupation: Operatic soprano
- Spouse: Gil Rudy (divorced)
- Children: 1
- Awards: Grammy Hall of Fame

Lucine Amara (born Lucine Tockqui Armaganian; March 1, 1925 – September 6, 2024) was an American soprano who was chiefly based at the Metropolitan Opera in New York.

== Biography ==
Lucine Tockqui Armaganian was born in Hartford, Connecticut, on March 1, 1925, to Armenian immigrant parents who had survived the Armenian genocide. She grew up in San Francisco. She studied at the San Francisco Community Music Center under Stella Eisner-Eyn and sang (initially as a contralto before her voice gradually rose) in the chorus of the San Francisco Opera, 1945–46.

== Career ==
In 1946, Amara made her concert debut at the War Memorial Opera House. Continuing her studies at the Music Academy of the West with Richard Bonelli in 1947, she won a contest to appear at the Hollywood Bowl in 1948. She continued as a student at the University of Southern California and as a soloist for the San Francisco Symphony for the following two years. Amara appeared in the title role of Ariadne auf Naxos and as Lady Billows in Britten's Albert Herring in 1949.

Amara made her Metropolitan Opera debut as the "Voice from Heaven" in Verdi's Don Carlos, the opening night of Sir Rudolf Bing's inaugural season as general manager, on November 6, 1950. She continued at the Met over the course of 41 seasons until 1991, singing 56 roles in 882 appearances, nearly 60 of which were broadcast on radio and television. Appearing regularly as Micaëla in Carmen, Cio-Cio-San in Madama Butterfly, and Tatiana in Eugene Onegin, Antonia in Les contes d'Hoffmann, Donna Elvira in Don Giovanni, Nedda in Pagliacci, Mimi in La bohème, her repertoire also included Leonora in Il trovatore and Aida.

In the mid-1970s, Amara was given only a "cover" contract – essentially a contract to be a stand-by for an indisposed singer – and was scheduled for fewer and fewer performances. In 1976 at the age of 51, she successfully sued the Met for age discrimination, but sang only sporadically with the company after that, and was absent from the roster from 1977 until 1981, when she was given a new contract. In the last years of her Met career, she sang only one or two performances a season (one performance each in 1985, 1986, 1988, 1989 and 1991, and two in 1987; the 1985 performance took place at the Kennedy Center where the Met was on tour; the 1986 performance was presented by the Met in Brooklyn's Prospect Park). Amara did not appear with the company at its Lincoln Center home between 1983 and 1987.

Amara also performed in Europe, Asia, and South America, including at Glyndebourne (1954–55, 1957–58), the Edinburgh Festival (1954), the Vienna State Opera (1960), Russia (1965), and China (1983.)

Amara made a few recordings, notably as Musetta in La bohème, opposite Victoria de los Ángeles, Jussi Björling and Robert Merrill under Thomas Beecham, and as Elsa in Lohengrin, opposite Sandor Konya, Rita Gorr, Jerome Hines under Erich Leinsdorf. She recorded the role of Nedda in Pagliacci twice, opposite Richard Tucker in 1951 and opposite Franco Corelli in 1960. Amara was also recorded singing the soprano solo in Verdi's Messa da Requiem. Made in 1964–65, the recording also features Maureen Forrester (mezzo-soprano), Richard Tucker (tenor), George London (bass), and the Philadelphia Orchestra, conducted by Eugene Ormandy.

== Later career ==
After retiring, Amara became the artistic director of the New Jersey Association of Verismo and taught master classes in the United States, Canada and Mexico. On January 23, 2005, she performed as a special guest artist with the Musica Bella Orchestra. The Times called Amara "the greatest lyric soprano of our time". Time Magazine wrote that "she brought to the stage the kind of dazzling vocal splendor that made the Met famous". In 1989 she was inducted into the Academy of Vocal Arts Hall of Fame.

== Personal life and death ==
Amara was married to and divorced from Gil Rudy. She had a daughter.

Amara was a longtime resident of the Upper West Side of Manhattan. However, at the end of her life, when suffering from dementia, she lived with her daughter in Queens, where she died from a respiratory infection and heart failure on September 6, 2024, at the age of 99.

== Filmography ==
- Carmen (1952) (TV), Frasquita
- The Great Caruso, (1951)

== Sources ==
- The Metropolitan Opera Encyclopedia, edited by David Hamilton ISBN 0-671-61732-X
- www.allmusic.com, Erik Eriksson
- www.naxos.com
- Musica Bella Biographies / www.webcitation.org
- Opera News, September 2005 – "Reunion: Lucine Amara" by Eric Myers
- Metropolitan Opera Archives / http://archives.metoperafamily.org/archives/frame.htm
