= Chinary Ung =

Cambodian-American composer

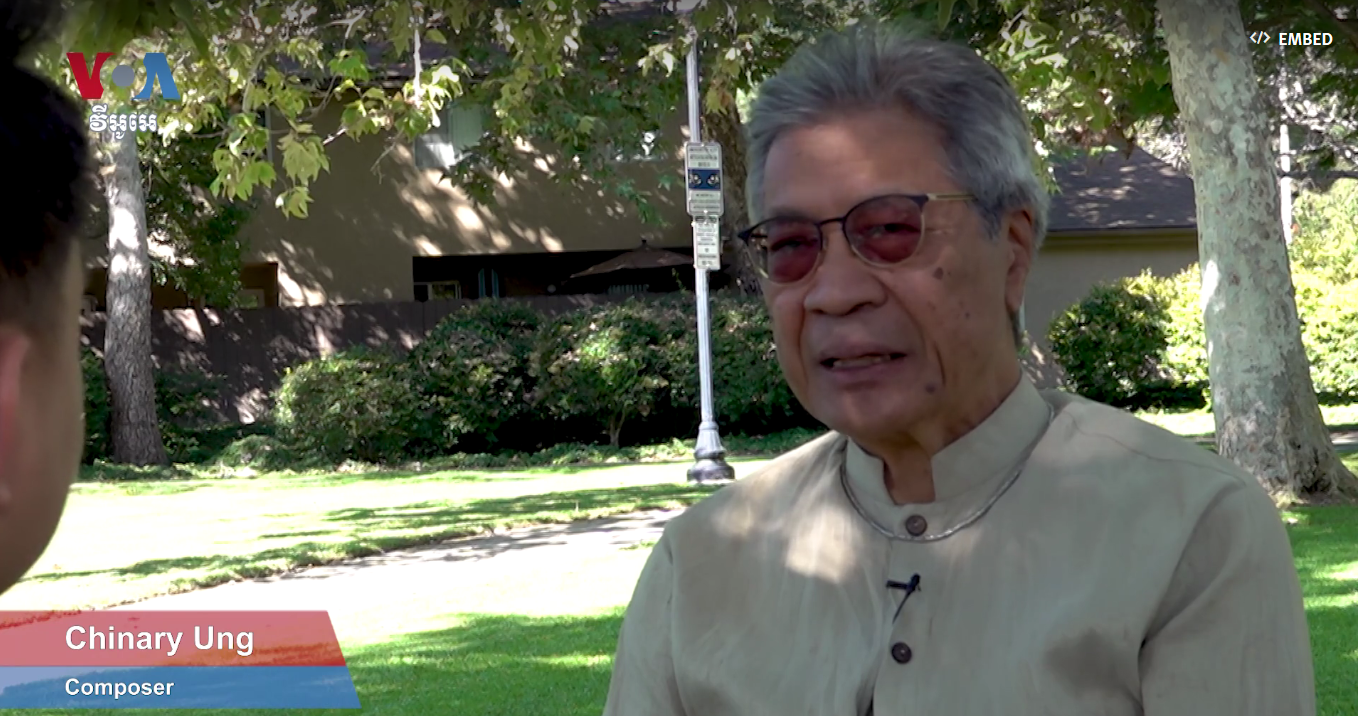
Ung speaking with the Voice of America in 2020

Chinary Ung (Khmer: អ៊ុង ឈីណារី pronounced [ʔuŋ cʰiːn̪aːriː]) (born November 24, 1942, in Takéo, Cambodia) is a composer currently living in California, United States.

== Career ==
After arriving in the US in 1965 to study clarinet, he turned to composition studies with Chou Wen-chung and Mario Davidovsky, receiving a Doctor of Musical Arts from Columbia University in 1974. In 1988, he became the first American to win the University of Louisville Grawemeyer Award for musical composition. Additionally, he received the Kennedy Center Friedheim Award, as well as awards from The American Academy of Arts and Letters, Asia Foundation, Asian Cultural Council, Rockefeller Foundation, Ford Foundation, Guggenheim Foundation, Joyce Foundation, and The National Endowment for the Arts.

In October 2007 the Del Sol String Quartet was invited to premiere the composer's Spiral X playing the Library of Congress' collection of Stradivarius instruments.

Ung taught music at Northern Illinois University, Connecticut College, the University of Pennsylvania, and Arizona State University, before being appointed to the faculty at the University of California, San Diego. In 2013, UC San Diego promoted Ung to the rank of Distinguished Professor.

Ung's music is published by C. F. Peters Corporation and his music is recorded on New World Records, Bridge Records, Cambria, London Records, Other Minds, Oodiscs, Nami Records, Kojima Records, Albany Records, Norton Recordings, Composers Recording Incorporated, Folkways Records, and Koch International.

== Awards ==
- University of Louisville Grawemeyer Award for Music Composition (1989) for Inner Voices
- Friedheim Award (1989) for Spiral
- American Academy and Institute of Arts and Letters (1981, 1988)
- John D. Rockefeller 3rd Award from the Asian Cultural Council (2014)
- American Academy of Arts and Letters (2020)
- Isadora Duncan Dance Awards Nomination (2025) for Rebirth of Apsara

== Selected list of works ==
- 1970 – Tall Wind, for soprano and chamber ensemble
- 1974 – Mohori, for soprano and chamber ensemble
- 1980 – Khse Buon, for solo cello or viola
- 1985 – Child Song, for alto flute, viola, harp
- 1986 – Inner Voices, for orchestra
- 1987 – Spiral, for cello, piano, and percussion
- 1989 – Spiral II, for soprano, tuba, and piano
- 1990 – Grand Spiral: Desert Flowers Bloom, for symphonic band
- 1992 – Spiral VI, for clarinet, violin, cello, and piano
- 1995 – Antiphonal Spirals, for orchestra
- 1997 – Seven Mirrors, for solo piano
