= National Circus School of Cambodia =

Information
- Other names: National Cambodian circus The Center for Performing Arts Phnom Penh
- Established: 20 September 1980; 45 years ago

The National Circus School of Cambodia, sometimes referred to as the National Cambodian circus or The Center for Performing Arts Phnom Penh is a two-part organization, consisting of the actual school that trains the performers, and the acrobatic troop. Established 20 September 1980, the National Circus School of Cambodia accepted its first class of 45 students, most of whom were orphans whose parents were lost under the Pol Pot regime.

Traditional Cambodian circus artists had failed to maintain a national cultural presence despite proof illustrating their existence prior to the fall of Angkor in 1352. Sculptures near the Wat temple & the Bayon temple all depict images of traditional circus arts. Yet, even in 1970, these arts were not resurrected until the school opened in Phnom Penh, Cambodia.

The first class of 45 were taught by Vietnamese and Russian teachers, with ten students continuing their training in Russia. Seeking training from foreign partners was a common tactic to complement the domestic training. Students were also trained in Vietnam, France and China. They have also teamed up with Phare, The Cambodian Circus based in Siem Reap, Cambodia on a number of occasions, primarily when they put on the Tini Tinou Circus Festival (2) 2012..

The school was managed by the Ministry of Culture and Art from 1980 onwards, before management of the school was transferred to the Royal university of Fine Arts- Choreographic Arts in 1990. The Royal University of Fine arts then split in 2003 into an institution retaining its original name and the intermediate School of Fine Arts, under which the National Circus School of Cambodia is currently managed.

The Vietnamese government, artists and teachers continued to offer their support and even provided a fully functional circus tent with 1000 audience seats which was opened on 26 September 2012.

Since then, their artists have gained popularity on TV shows such as Cambodia’s Got Talent (3).
