= Yerba Buena Gardens Festival =

Californian performing arts festival

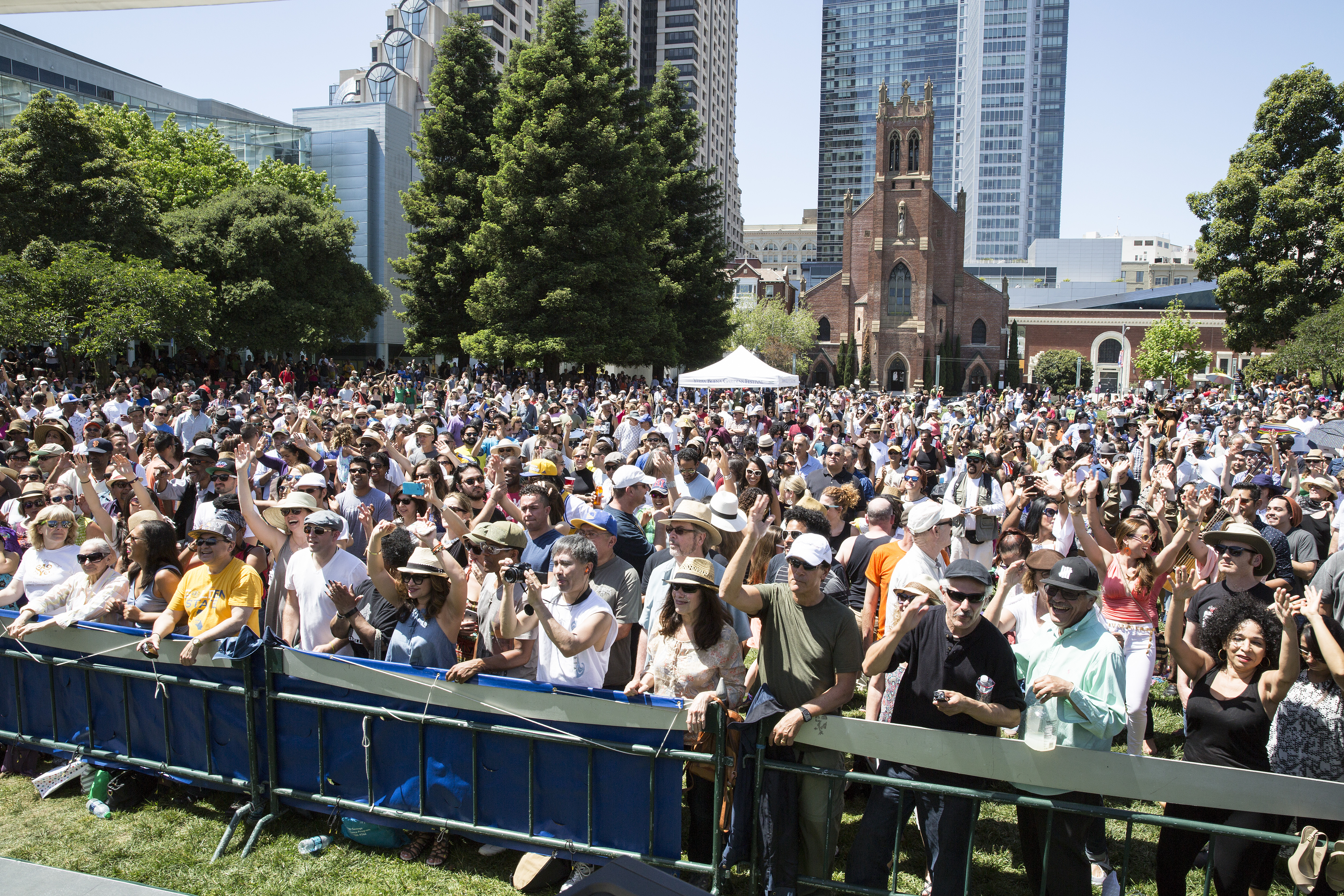
- Audience at Yerba Buena Gardens Festival in 2016
- Established: 2000; 26 years ago
- Location: Yerba Buena Gardens, San Francisco, California
- Coordinates: 37°47′05″N 122°24′10″W
- Type: Music festival
- Website: ybgfestival.org

Yerba Buena Gardens Festival (also known as Yerba Buena Arts & Events, and YBGF) is an admission-free performing arts festival held in San Francisco, California. During the summer months, May to October, Yerba Buena Gardens Festival produces concerts and performances including music, dance, theater, circus and children's programs. All programs take place in the outdoor spaces of Yerba Buena Gardens in the South of Market, San Francisco district.

== History ==
Yerba Buena Gardens Festival was founded in 2000 by Mario Garcia Durham with support from the San Francisco Redevelopment Agency in order to fulfill the cultural programming mission of the outdoor spaces at Yerba Buena Gardens. The organization is "dedicated to enhancing the vitality and quality of life in the Bay Area through the performing arts." Linda Lucero has been the Executive/Artistic Director since 2003.

== Programs ==
The core program of YBGF is a six-month season of admission-free performing arts events. Genres presented include world music, classical, jazz, traditional and contemporary dance, theater, circus arts and children's programs, "reflecting the rich diversity and creativity of the region." Most events take place on the Esplanade lawn of Yerba Buena Gardens. Notable concerts include performances by the San Francisco Symphony, LINES Ballet, Jazz Mafia, AXIS Dance Company, and others. The programs often pair international touring artists with local Bay Area groups.

YBGF is also the host for several large annual cultural festivals in San Francisco including San Francisco's Dr. Martin Luther King, Jr. Birthday Observance, Native Contemporary Arts Festival, AfroSolo Festival, Pistahan, and San Francisco's Indigenous Peoples' Day Celebration.

== Other ==
In addition to presenting, YBGF has a history of commissioning new work for outdoor spaces. Commissioned projects include a musical suite on the prison industrial complex by composer/bassist Marcus Shelby, circus performances by Circus Bella, and traditional performances by hula company Na Lei Hulu I Ka Wekiu, among others. In 2020, YBGF commissioned 20 Bay Area artists in celebration of its 20th anniversary.
