= Maestro Curtis =

American musician, composer and music executive

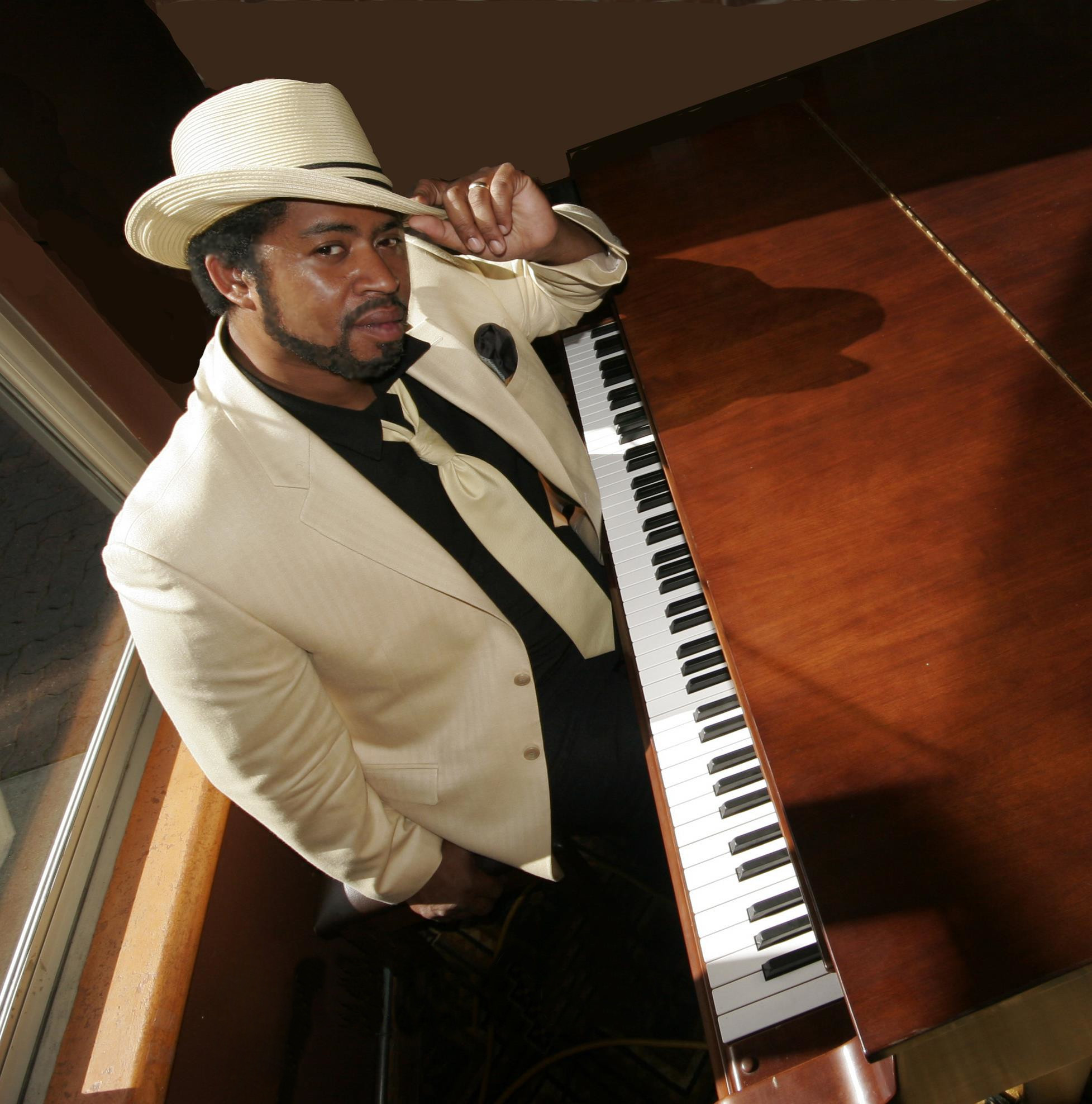
- Maestro Curtis in San Francisco, CA

Background information
- Also known as: Stro, Stro-Ra, J.S. Free, Free
- Born: Maestro Brian Kendall Curtis; December 9, 1956 (age 69)
- Genres: Blues, "jazz", swing, bop, hard bop, Afro-Cuban, contemporary jazz, progressive, avant-garde, gospel, funk, soul, R&B, blues, classical, reggae, country, eastern, world
- Occupations: Musician, record producer, educator, arranger, composer, singer, pianist, author
- Instruments: Piano, guitar, bass, voice, woodwinds, violas, harmonica
- Years active: 1971– present
- Labels: Kalimba, JazzyBoo Records, MCA, Sony, Silhouette, Castle Rock
- Website: www.maestrocurtis.com

Maestro Curtis, also known as Maestro Brian, is an American musician, composer, author, producer, arranger and music executive.

== Biography ==
Curtis was born into a family of musicians. His mother, Lucille Wong Curtis Robinson (née Lucille Wong; 1937–1998), was a jazz and gospel singer who had performed across the Louisiana bayou and the San Francisco Bay Area. Her twin brother, Emile "Cy" Wong (1937–2019), was also a singer and songwriter, the latter of which connected to Nat King Cole's independent record label, K-C Records (1962–1963). Maestro eventually earned a scholarship to Grambling State University. While there he played in the Duke Ellington and Count Basie Orchestras. At Grambling State he went on to attain bachelor's degrees in music (piano and voice), speech and theatre, and radio and television production with a minor in English and foreign languages.

Grambling State University is home of the Grambling Tiger Marching Band under the direction of Conrad Hutchinson Jr. While matriculating at Grambling's music department, Maestro was a student of world-renowned classical organist and pianist Curtis Mayo and pianist Delmar Wykoff, whose students were such notables as Joe Sample and Ronnie Laws just to name a few. During his undergraduate studies, Maestro was a member of a gospel group, "The Father's Children", who traveled with the president of Grambling, Joseph B. Johnson, as ambassadors for the university. It was during this two-year period that he sang and performed with Reverend James Cleveland, Bobby Jones, Edwin Hawkins, Walter Hawkins, Reverend Daryl Coley, Carlton Pearson, Andraé Crouch, and The Staple Singers.

Shortly after leaving, "The Father's Children", he scored the music for two off-Broadway plays, Laid to Rest I and II a dramatic musical comedy collaboration with writer Gary Flannigan that utilized all of his original Dixie and big-band compositions, which earned him the Louisiana Governor's Award. During this time at Grambling State University he was appointed the vocalist, pianist, and band leader for the University's jazz band (and a member of Phi Mu Alpha Sinfonia), affording him the opportunities to play with such jazz masters as Joe Williams, Ella Fitzgerald, Sarah Vaughan, Carmen McRae, Dizzy Gillespie, (all of whom appeared at black institutions such as Grambling State University, to teach, perform, and share their knowledge with young up and coming musicians carrying on the jazz legacy and tradition) and was one of the youngest pianists ever to play with the Count Basie Orchestra under Dr. Frank Foster. After completing his bachelor's degrees, Maestro earned his Master's degrees in orchestration & arrangement, and philosophy, and remained at the university 5 years after as a part of the teaching staff.

Curtis went on to play with musicians such as Phyllis Hyman, Will Downing, Lenny Williams, George Benson and the O'Jays and has produced with music producers such as Maurice White (Earth, Wind & Fire founder) and Hubert Eaves III (the other half of the hit-making duo D-Train).

== Musical career ==
Maestro Curtis and his group, Xpression, was eventually signed to Maurice White of Earth, Wind & Fire's record label, Kalimba Records. With White serving as executive producer the group's debut album, Power, was released in June 2000 upon Kalimba.

Within the album's liner notes White exclaimed that:

The band is named Xpression because when all five members of the band come together to play it is a true expression of their musical cohesion. The music on this record is the result of the collaboration between very accomplished musicians, it is rooted in classic R&B with jazz undercurrents tailored for commercial appeal. It covers all the bases, it's energetic, sincere and sensitive. I hope you like it as much as I have enjoyed helping with its creation.

As well Curtis sits on the executive board of Hitman Records as the vice president of A&R. Hitman is an independent record label whose roster of artists span throughout the US. Along with the company's CEO C. Michael Brae he was featured in the magazine Black Enterprise. This came in a 2005 article entitled "Topping The Charts" which entailed the varying means of navigating the music industry. As well the piece went on to illustrate techniques used by independent record labels to develop and establish new artistes.

Maestro as well holds private teaching sessions, workshops, and business classes based upon music and the music industry. He has also served as a panelist upon several music business conferences altogether.

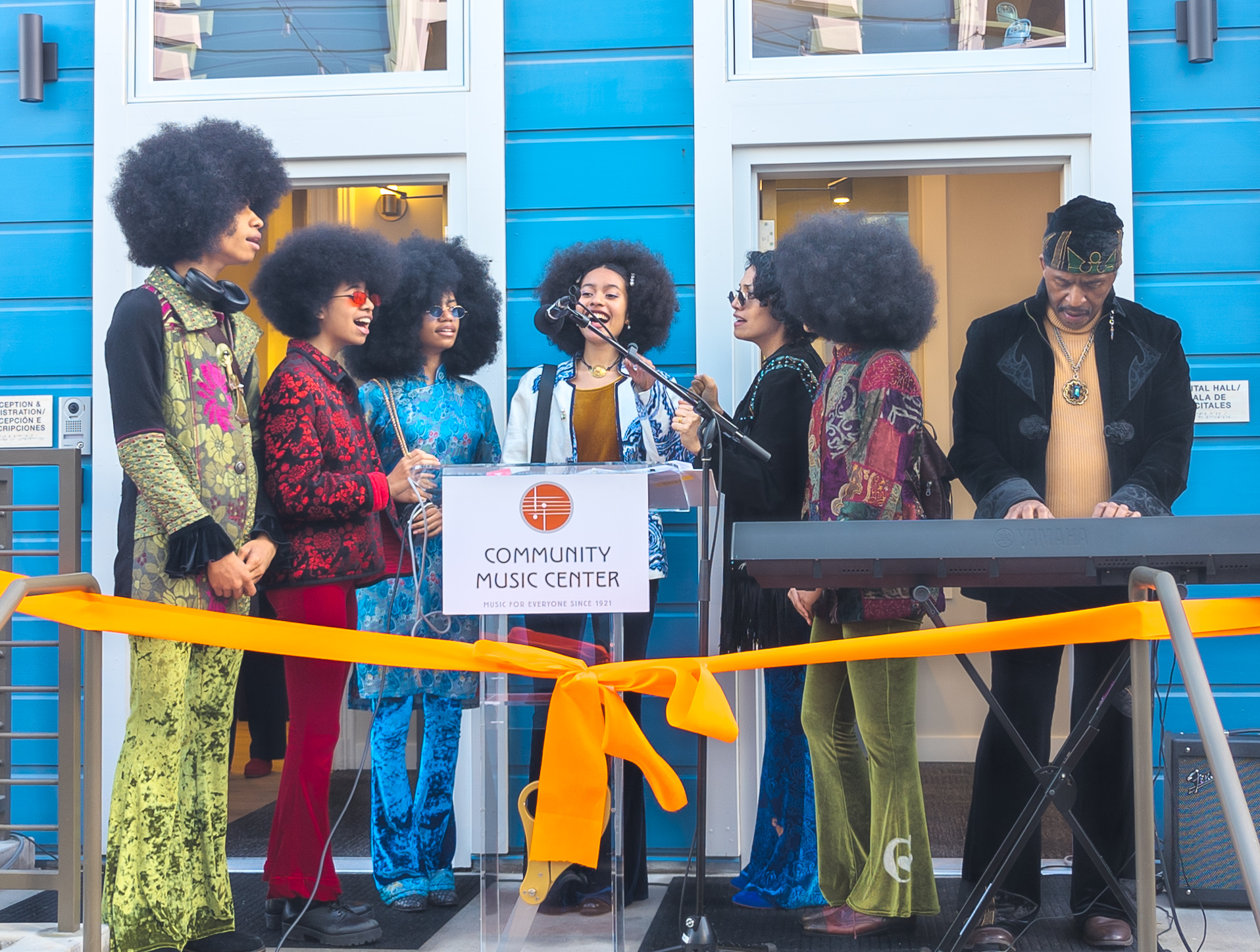
The Curtis Family C-Notes perform at a ribbon-cutting ceremony for the new expansion of the San Francisco Community Music Center.

Maestro, his wife Nola, and their five children perform as a family band, "The Curtis Family C-Notes". The band competed on America's Got Talent in 2021.

Maestro and Nola are faculty members at the San Francisco Community Music Center, where they have established a Black Music Studies program.

== Author ==
Maestro Curtis and David Gibson are coauthors of the best selling book The Art of Producing published by Artist Pro. The book guides the reader through step-by-step processes on producing a record, utilizing various techniques, and most importantly, remaining technologically relevant.

== Film ==
Maestro also starred in an independent Scifi feature film, "Origin", where he plays dual roles. The film was released in episodes upon YouTube during 2010.

== Sound Healer ==
Maestro Curtis is an integral figure of the Sound Healing Community in North America. In addition to his private sound healing practice, he also teaches at one of the foremost sound healing institutes in the world, The Sound and Consciousness Institute, located in San Francisco. In 2007, the World Sound Healing Conference held in San Francisco, CA, he was one of the keynote speakers and musicians, amongst the leaders and pioneers in Sound Healing. During the final concert of the conference Maestro performed with guitarist Stanley Jordan.

Maestro infuses his music with sound healing techniques, in fact, the Nutri Energetics System (NES), uses the music that he created alongside David Gibson in a project called, "Body Field Sound Healing", which is referred to as "Imprinted Music", that is "encoded with information to enhance your well-being." The music that Maestro contributed is used in conjunction with the homeopathic, natural and non-invasive healing techniques that NES specializes in.
