= Alliance for California Traditional Arts =

- Formation: 1997; 29 years ago
- Type: 501(c)(3) Nonprofit
- Headquarters: Fresno, California, US
- Locations: San Francisco, California, US, Los Angeles, California, US,

Alliance for California Traditional Arts (ACTA) is a private nonprofit organization that provides advocacy, grants, and other resources for folk and traditional artists in California. Amy Kitchener, a public folklorist, is the co-founder, founding director, and executive director. They are headquartered in Fresno, California, with additional locations in Los Angeles and San Francisco.

== History and mission ==
Founded in 1997 by artists, arts administrators, and cultural arts enthusiasts, this organization began with a budget of $15,000, which has since grown to over 1.2 million annually. In 1999, ACTA became recognized as the official partner of the California Arts Council and has the distinction of being the only state organization that focuses solely on folk and traditional arts. ACTA incorporated in 2001 and achieved 501(c)(3) status in December 2002.

The Alliance for California Traditional Arts’ (ACTA's) mission is to “ensure that California’s future holds California’s past.” ACTA is a statewide nonprofit organization that promotes and supports ways for cultural traditions to thrive now and into the future by providing advocacy, resources, and connections for folk and traditional artists and their communities.

== Programs and grants ==
ACTA is funded through a diverse network of foundations, arts councils, and philanthropists. There are numerous ways for nonprofit groups to receive benefits from ACTA. Among the simplest is by listing themselves in ACTA's statewide database, by receiving the monthly e-newsletter ACTA publishes on traditional and folk arts, and by using their website as a forum to advertise their events as well as a vehicle to learn about other national and statewide agencies committed to helping the arts.

The crux of the support that ACTA gives to local arts communities is through three separate programs offered every year: The Apprenticeship Program, the Living Cultures Grants Program, and the Traditional Arts Development Program. A fourth grant program, the Traditional Arts Sustainability Grant, was offered for the first time in 2010.

- Apprenticeship Program: designed to facilitate a one-on-one training experience where apprentices can spend six months to a year under the tutelage of a master artist who resides in California. For this period of concentrated learning, ACTA provides up to $3,000 in compensation to the master artist.
- Living Cultures Program: nonprofit organizations that are undergoing a project that can demonstrate a “significant impact on a cultural tradition,” may receive up to $7,500 toward their expenses.
- Traditional Arts Development Program: directed at both individuals as well as organizations, this program is intended to provide short term assistance for people to attend workshops, mentoring sessions, or specialized training activities that facilitate the strategic opportunity for growth of an artist or of an organization.
- Traditional Arts Sustainability Grants: the Community Leadership Project chose ACTA to offer 8 grants, of up to $30,000 a year, over a three-year period, to nonprofit organizations which focus on using traditional arts in order to contribute to high-concentration minority or low-income communities in the San Joaquin Valley and the Central Coast.
