= Culture of Cambodia =

Throughout Cambodia's long history, religion has been a major source of cultural inspiration. Over nearly two millennia, Cambodians have developed a unique Cambodian culture and belief system from the syncreticism of indigenous animistic beliefs and the Indian religions of Buddhism and Hinduism. Cambodia's achievements in art, architectures, music, and dance from the 9th and 14th century have had a great influence on many neighboring kingdoms, namely Thailand and Laos. The effect of Khmer culture can still be seen today in those countries, as they share many close characteristics with current-day Cambodia. The Tai borrowed from the Khmer many elements of Indianized Khmer culture, including royal ceremonies, customs followed at the court, and especially the Indian epic Ramayana, which influenced not only literature but also classical dance. Even in modern Thai culture the legacy of ancient Khmer culture is still evident.

== History ==
The Golden Age of Cambodia was between the 9th and 14th centuries, during the Angkor period, during which it was a powerful and prosperous empire that flourished and dominated almost all of inland Southeast Asia. Angkor eventually collapsed after much intensive in-fighting between royalty and constant warring with its increasingly powerful neighbors, notably Siam and Dai Viet. Many temples from this period like Bayon and Angkor Wat remain today, scattered throughout Thailand, Cambodia, Laos, and Vietnam as a reminder of the grandeur of Khmer arts and culture.

== Architecture and housing ==
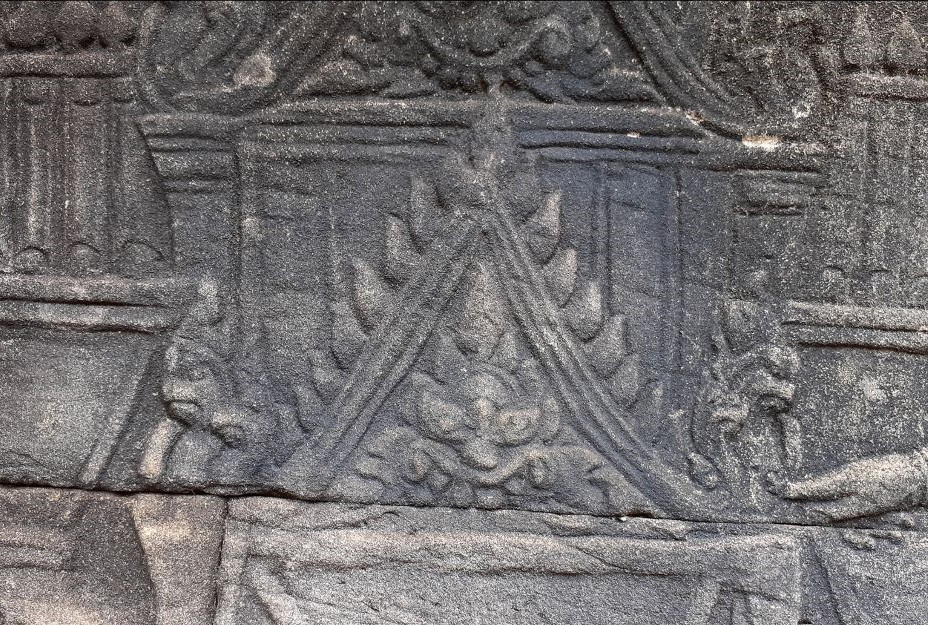
Triangular gabled roof depicted on a Bayon's 12th century bas relief still used in today Khmer architecture for palaces and pagodas.

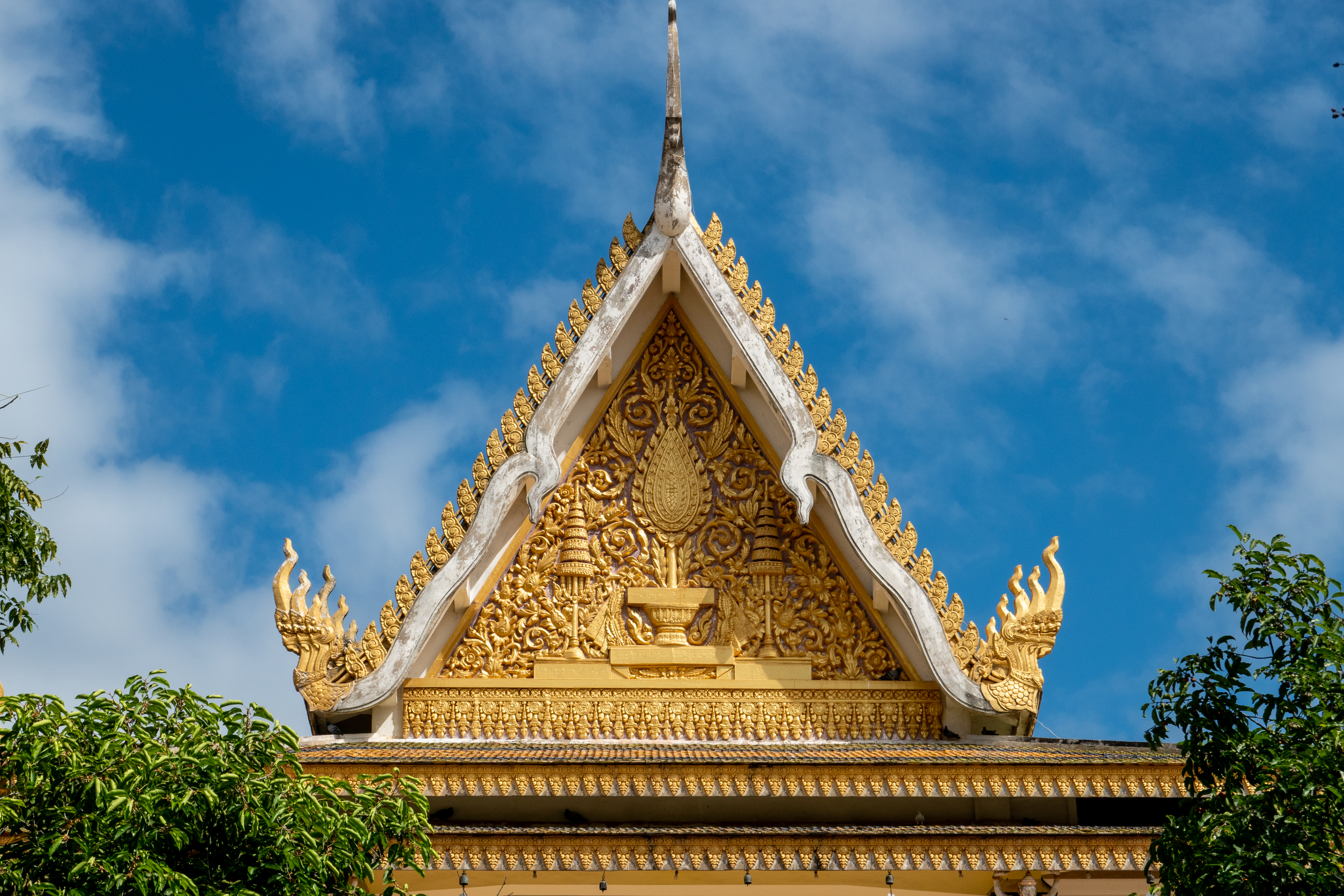
Wat Botum Watey Reacheveraram pagoda in Phnom Penh

The Angkorian architects and sculptors created temples that mapped the cosmic world in stone. Khmer decorations drew inspiration from religion, and mythical creatures from Hinduism and Buddhism were carved on walls. Temples were built in accordance to the rule of ancient Khmer architecture that dictated that a basic temple layout include a central shrine, a courtyard, an enclosing wall, and a moat. Khmer motifs use many creatures from Buddhist and Hindu mythology, like the Royal Palace in Phnom Penh, use motifs such as the garuda, a mythical bird in Hinduism.

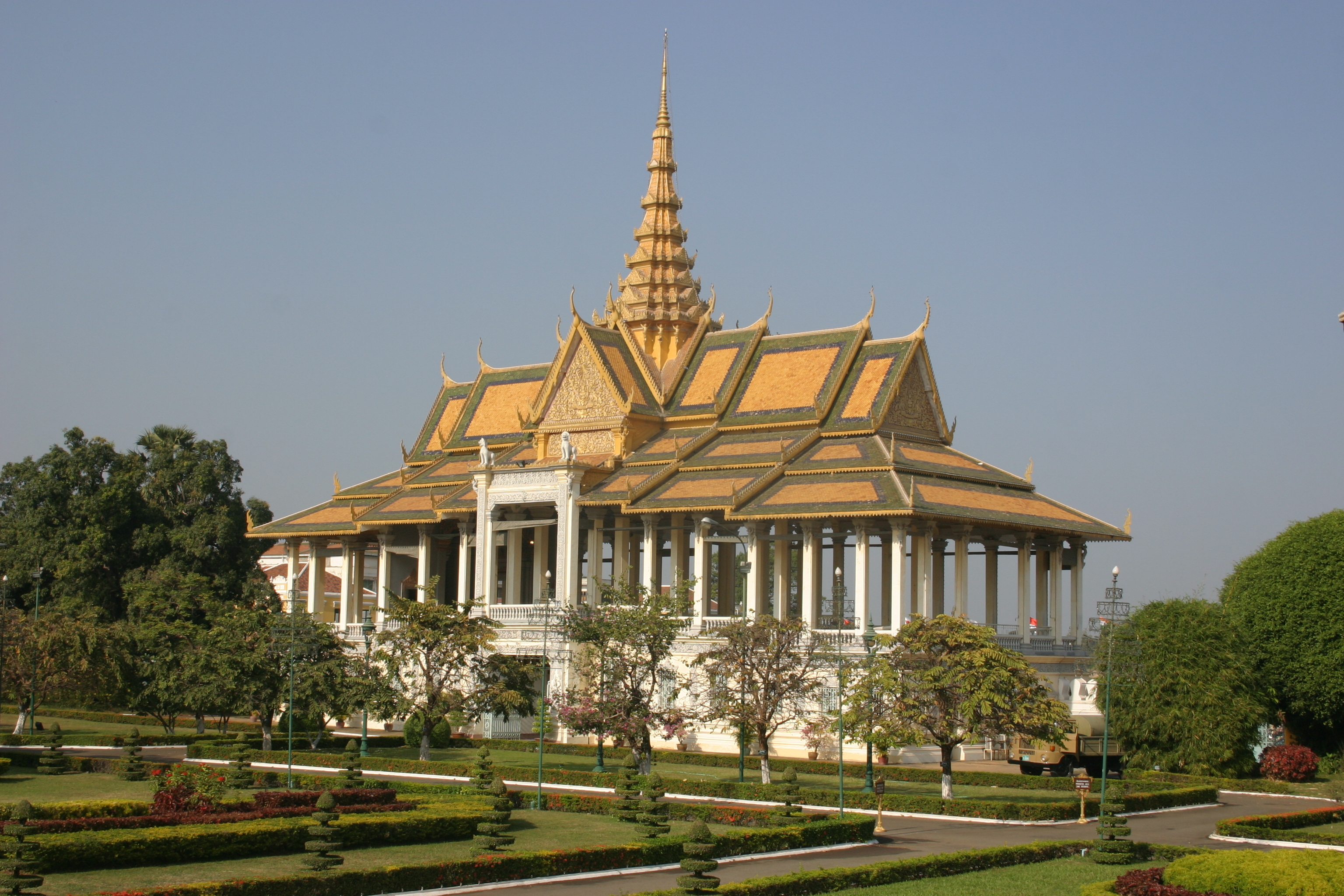
Moonlight pavilion in Phnom Penh

The architecture of Cambodia developed in stages under the Khmer Empire from the 9th to the 15th century, preserved in many buildings of the Angkor temple. The remains of secular architecture from this time are rare, as only religious buildings were made of stone. The architecture of the Angkor period used specific structural features and styles, which are one of the main methods used to date the temples, along with inscriptions.

In modern rural Cambodia, the nuclear family typically lives in a rectangular house that may vary in size from four by six meters to six by ten meters. It is constructed of a wooden frame with gabled thatch roof and walls of woven bamboo. Khmer houses are typically raised as much as three meters on stilts for protection from annual floods. Two ladders or wooden staircases provide access to the house.

A steep thatch roof overhanging the house walls protects the interior from rain. Typically a house contains three rooms separated by partitions of woven bamboo. The front room serves as a living room used to receive visitors, the next room is the parents' bedroom, and the third is for unmarried daughters. Sons sleep anywhere they can find space. Family members and neighbors work together to build the house, and a house-raising ceremony is held upon its completion.

The houses of poorer persons may contain only a single large room. Food is prepared in a separate kitchen located near the house but usually behind it. Toilet facilities consist of simple pits in the ground, located away from the house, that are covered up when filled. Any livestock is kept below the house. Chinese and Vietnamese houses in Cambodian towns and villages are typically built directly on the ground and have earthen, cement, or tile floors, depending upon the economic status of the owner. Urban housing and commercial buildings may be of brick, masonry, or wood.

Architecture of Cambodia

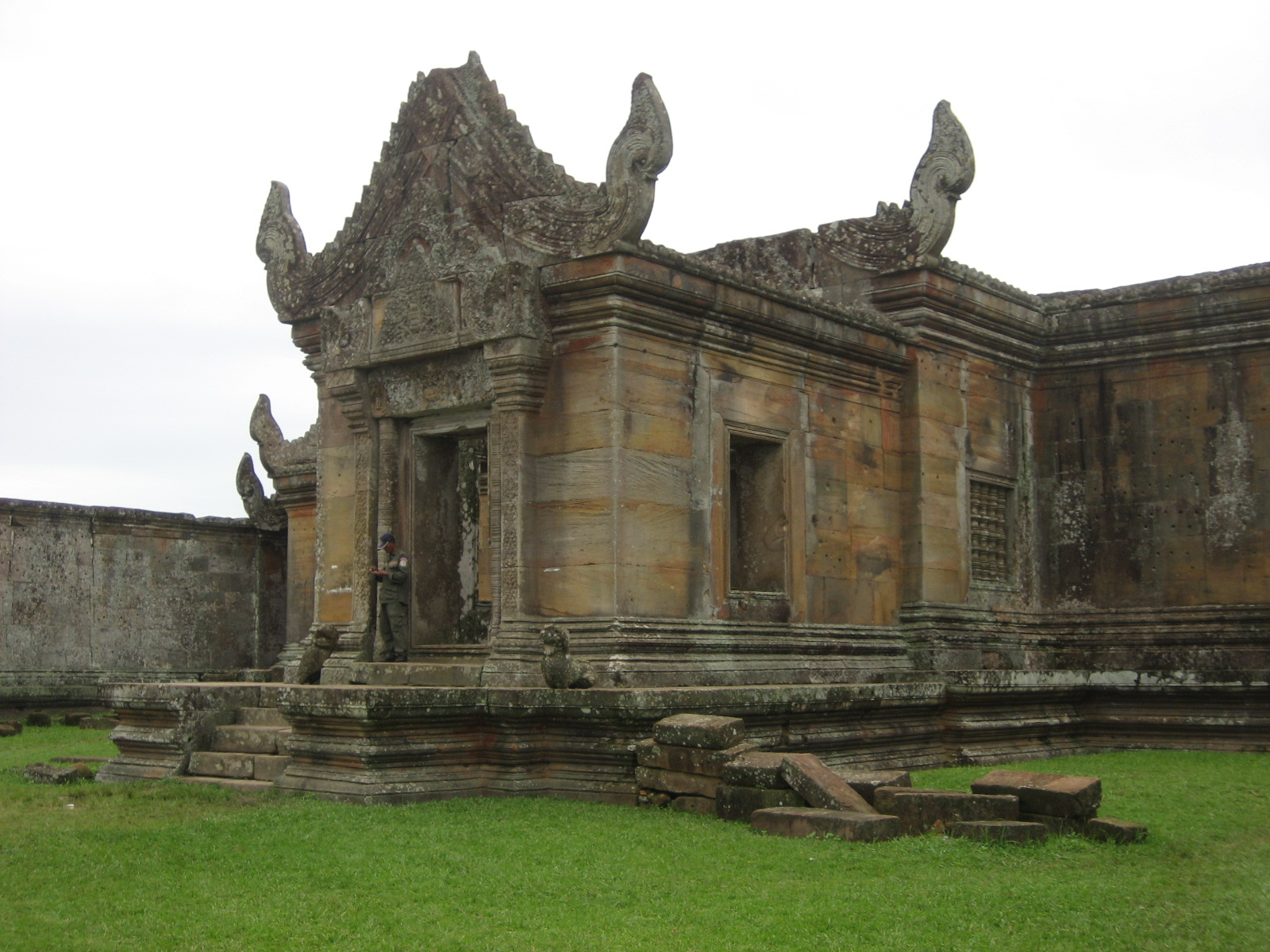
Preah Vihear

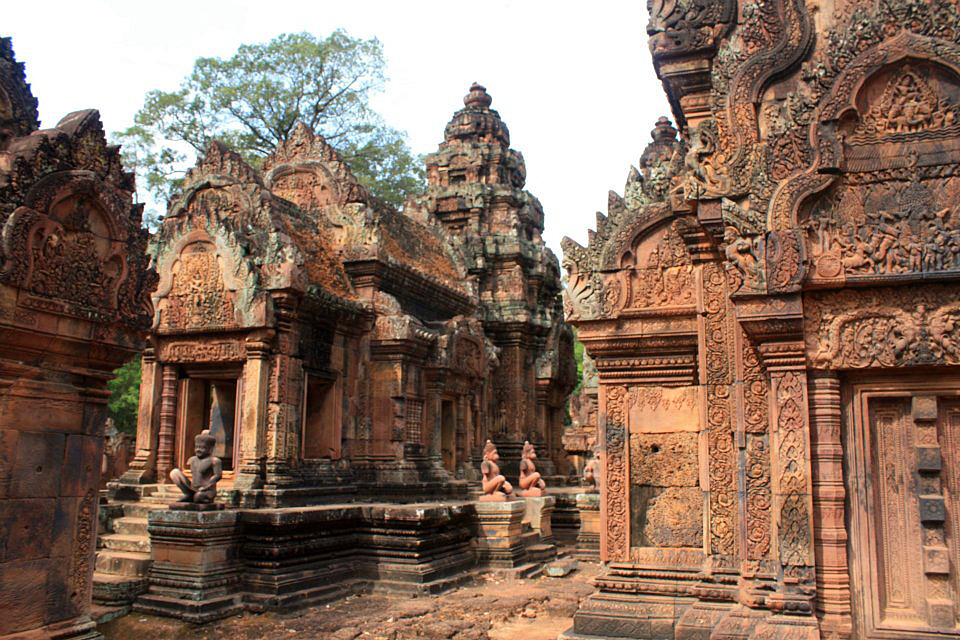
Banteay Srei Temple

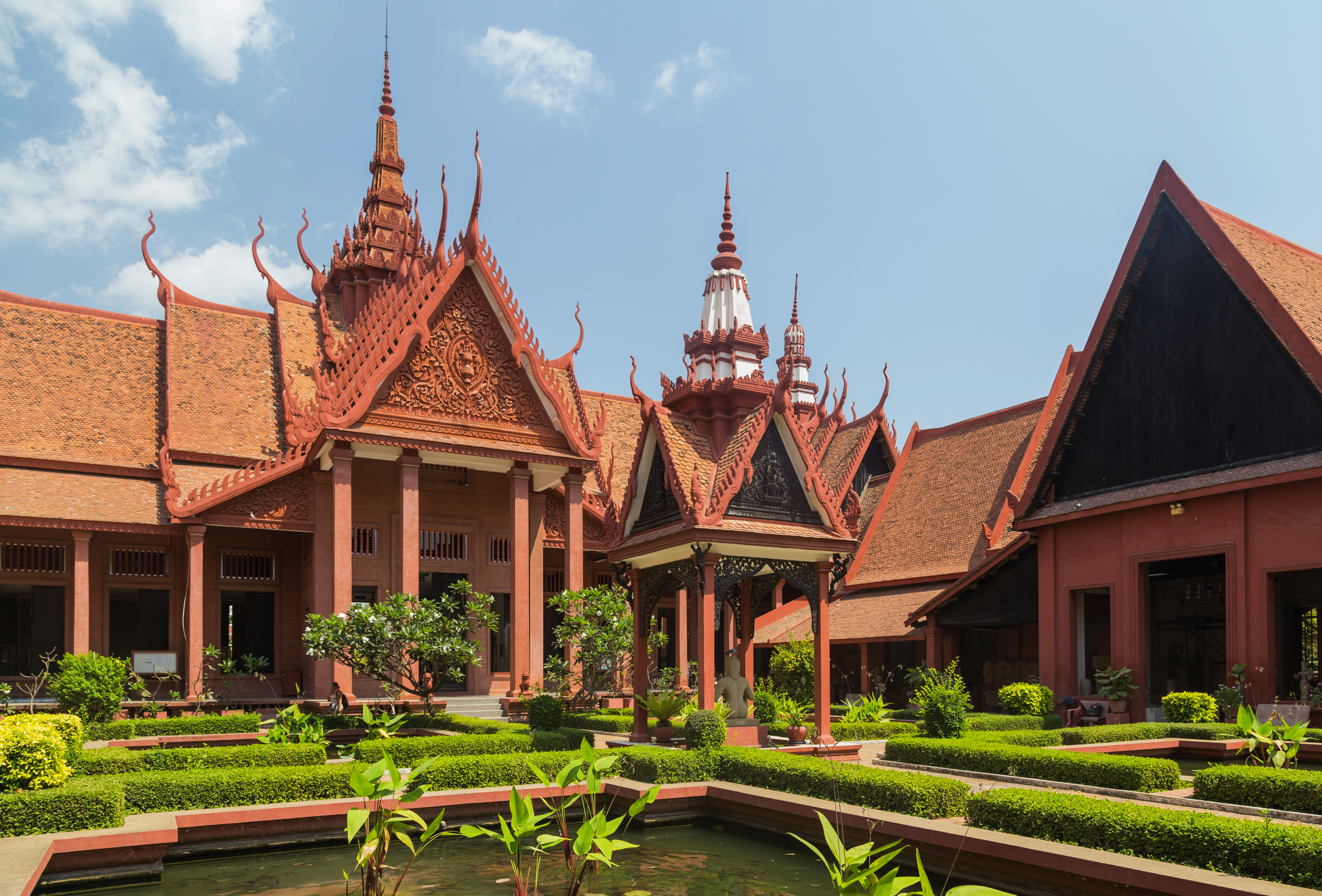
National Museum of Cambodia

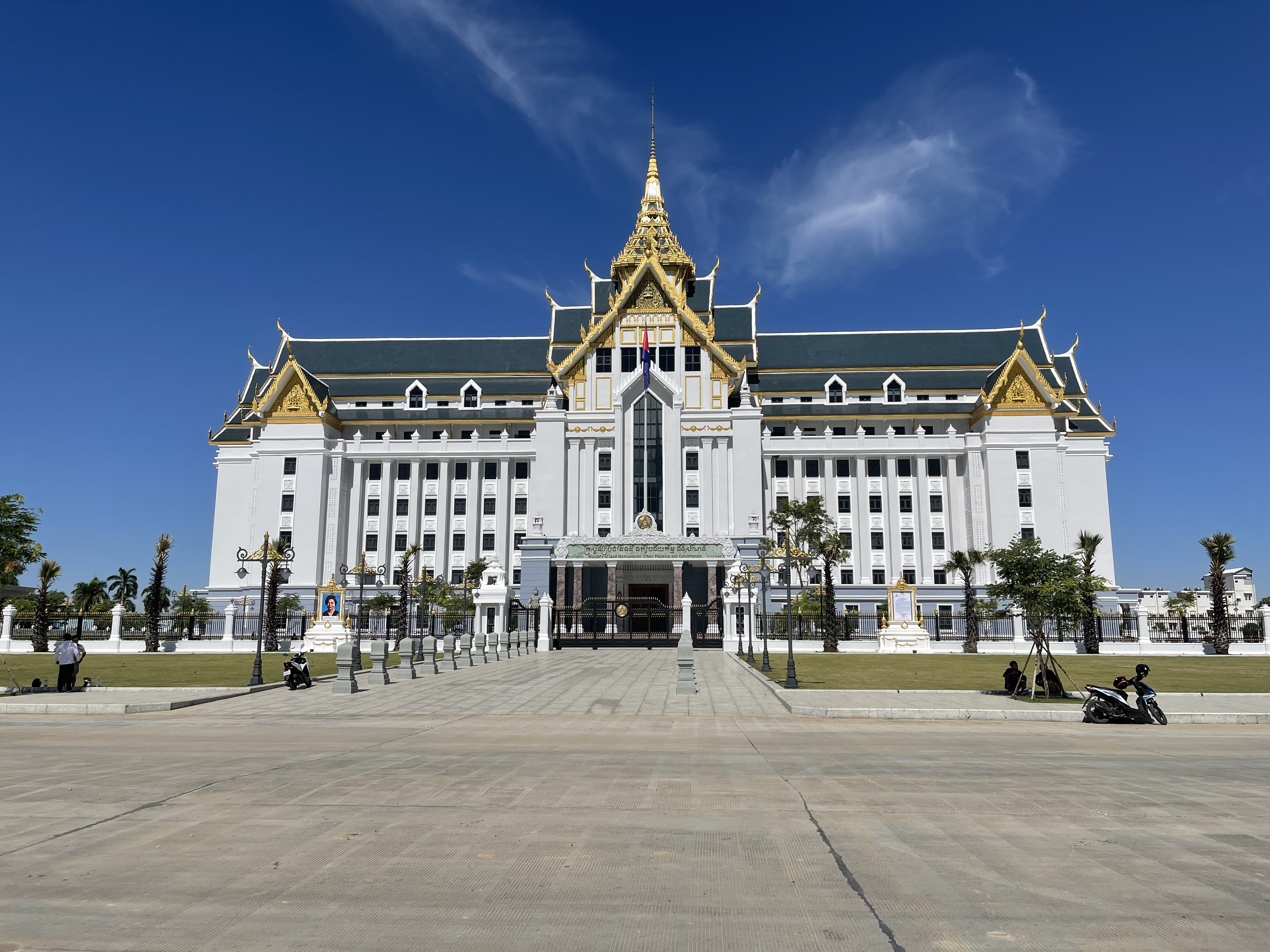
Ministry of Land Management

== Religion ==
Cambodia is predominantly Buddhist with 80% of the population being Theravada Buddhist, 1% Christian and the majority of the remaining population follow Islam, atheism, or animism.

Buddhism has existed in Cambodia since at least the 5th century CE. Theravada Buddhism has been the Cambodian state religion since the 13th century CE (excepting the Khmer Rouge period), and is currently estimated to be the faith of 90% of the population. A smaller number of Cambodians, mostly of Vietnamese and Chinese descent, practice Mahayana Buddhism. The main orders of Buddhism practiced in Cambodia are Dhammayuttika Nikaya and Maha Nikaya.

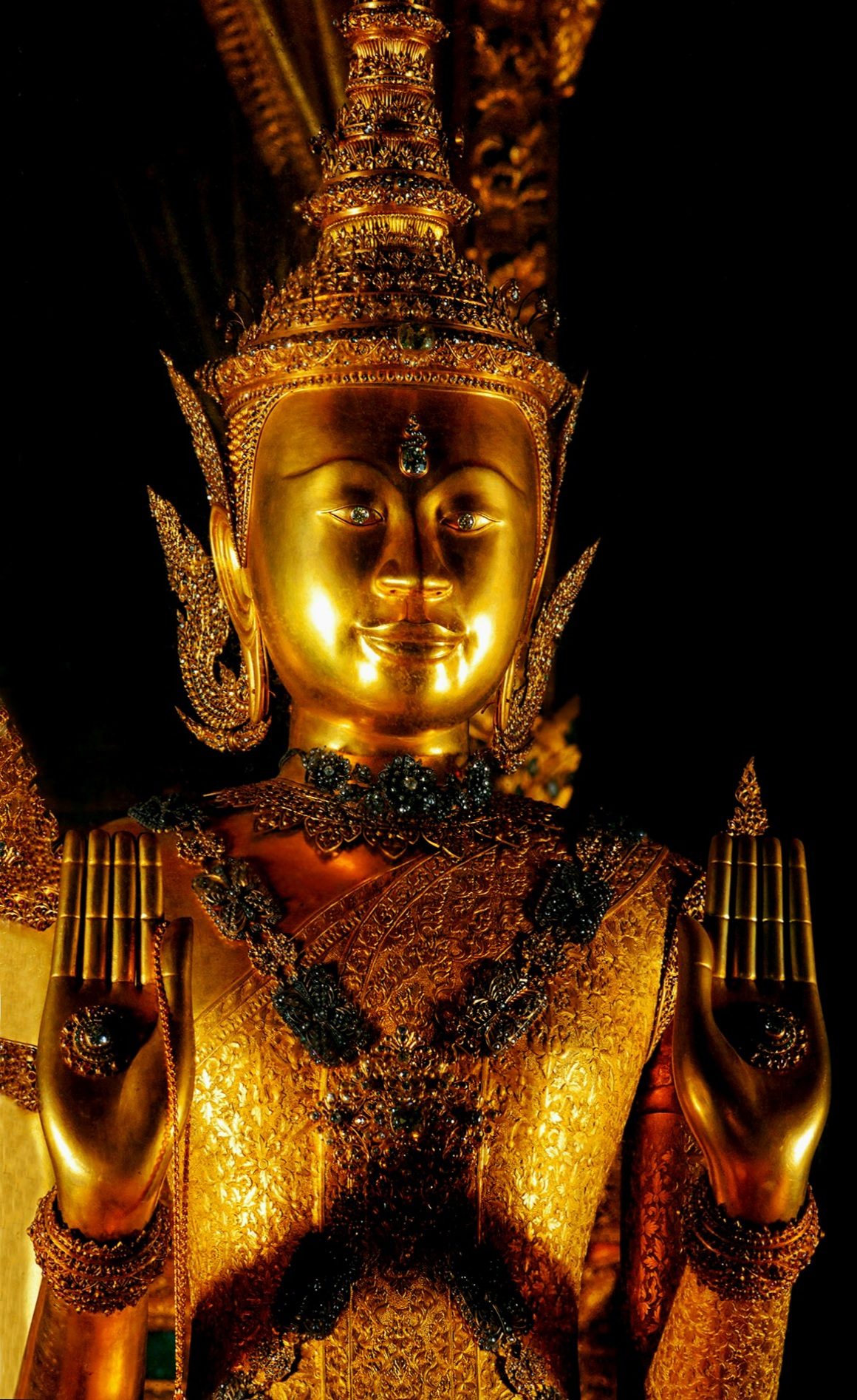
Maitreya Buddha made of gold in the Silver Pagoda of the Royal Palace of Cambodia

Islam is the religion of a majority of the Cham and Malay ethnic minorities (both also known under the umbrella term "Khmer Islam") in Cambodia. According to Po Dharma, there were 150,000 to 200,000 Muslims in Cambodia as late as 1975. Persecution under the Khmer Rouge eroded their numbers, however, and by the late 1980s they probably had not regained their former strength. All of the Cham Muslims are Sunnis of the Shafi'i school. Po Dharma divides the Muslim Cham in Cambodia into a traditionalist branch and an orthodox branch.

Christianity was introduced into Cambodia by Roman Catholic missionaries in 1660. It made little headway at first, particularly among Khmer Buddhists. In 1972 there were probably about 20,000 Christians in Cambodia, most of whom were Roman Catholics. According to Vatican statistics, in 1953, members of the Roman Catholic Church in Cambodia numbered 120,000, making it at that time the second largest religion in the country.

In April 1970, just before repatriation, estimates indicate that about 50,000 Catholics were Vietnamese. Many of the Catholics remaining in Cambodia in 1972 were Europeans—chiefly French. American Protestant missionary activity increased in Cambodia, especially among some of the hill tribes and among the Cham, after the establishment of the Khmer Republic. The 1962 census, which reported 2,000 Protestants in Cambodia, remains the most recent statistic for the group.

Observers reported that in 1980 there were more registered Khmer Christians among the refugees in camps in Thailand than in all of Cambodia before 1970. Kiernan notes that, until June 1980, five weekly Protestant services were held in Phnom Penh by a Khmer pastor, but that they had been reduced to a single weekly service after police harassment. There are around 21,300 Catholics in Cambodia which represents only 0.15% of the total population. There are no dioceses, but there are three territorial jurisdictions - one Apostolic Vicariate and two Apostolic Prefectures. Highland tribal groups, most with their own local religious systems, probably number fewer than 100,000 persons. The Khmer Loeu have been loosely described as animists, but most tribal groups have their own pantheon of local spirits. In general they see their world filled with various invisible spirits (often called yang), some benevolent, others malevolent. They associate spirits with rice, soil, water, fire, stones, paths, and so forth. Sorcerers or specialists in each village contact these spirits and prescribe ways to appease them.

In times of crisis or change, animal sacrifices may be made to placate the anger of the spirits. Illness is often believed to be caused by evil spirits or sorcerers. Some tribes have special medicine men or shamans who treat the sick. In addition to belief in spirits, villagers believe in taboos on many objects or practices. Among the Khmer Loeu, the Rhade and Jarai groups have a well-developed hierarchy of spirits with a supreme ruler at its head.

== Ways of life ==
=== Birth and death rituals ===
The birth of a child is a happy event for the family. According to traditional beliefs, however, confinement and childbirth expose the family, and especially the mother and the child to harm from the spirit world. A woman who dies in childbirth—crosses the river (chhlâng tónlé) in Khmer is believed to become an evil spirit. In traditional Khmer society, a pregnant woman respects a number of food taboos and avoids certain situations. These traditions remain in practice in rural Cambodia, but they have become weakened in urban areas.

Death is not viewed with the great outpouring of grief common to Western society; it is viewed as the end of one life and as the beginning of another life that one hopes will be better. Buddhist Khmer usually are cremated, and their ashes are deposited in a stupa in the temple compound. A corpse is washed, dressed, and placed in a coffin, which may be decorated with flowers and with a photograph of the deceased. White pennant-shaped flags, called "white crocodile flags," outside a house indicate that someone in that household has died.

A funeral procession consisting of an achar, Buddhist monks, members of the family, and other mourners accompanies the coffin to the crematorium. The spouse and the children show mourning by shaving their heads and by wearing white clothing. Relics such as teeth or pieces of bone are prized by the survivors, and they are often worn on gold chains as amulets.

=== Childhood and adolescence ===
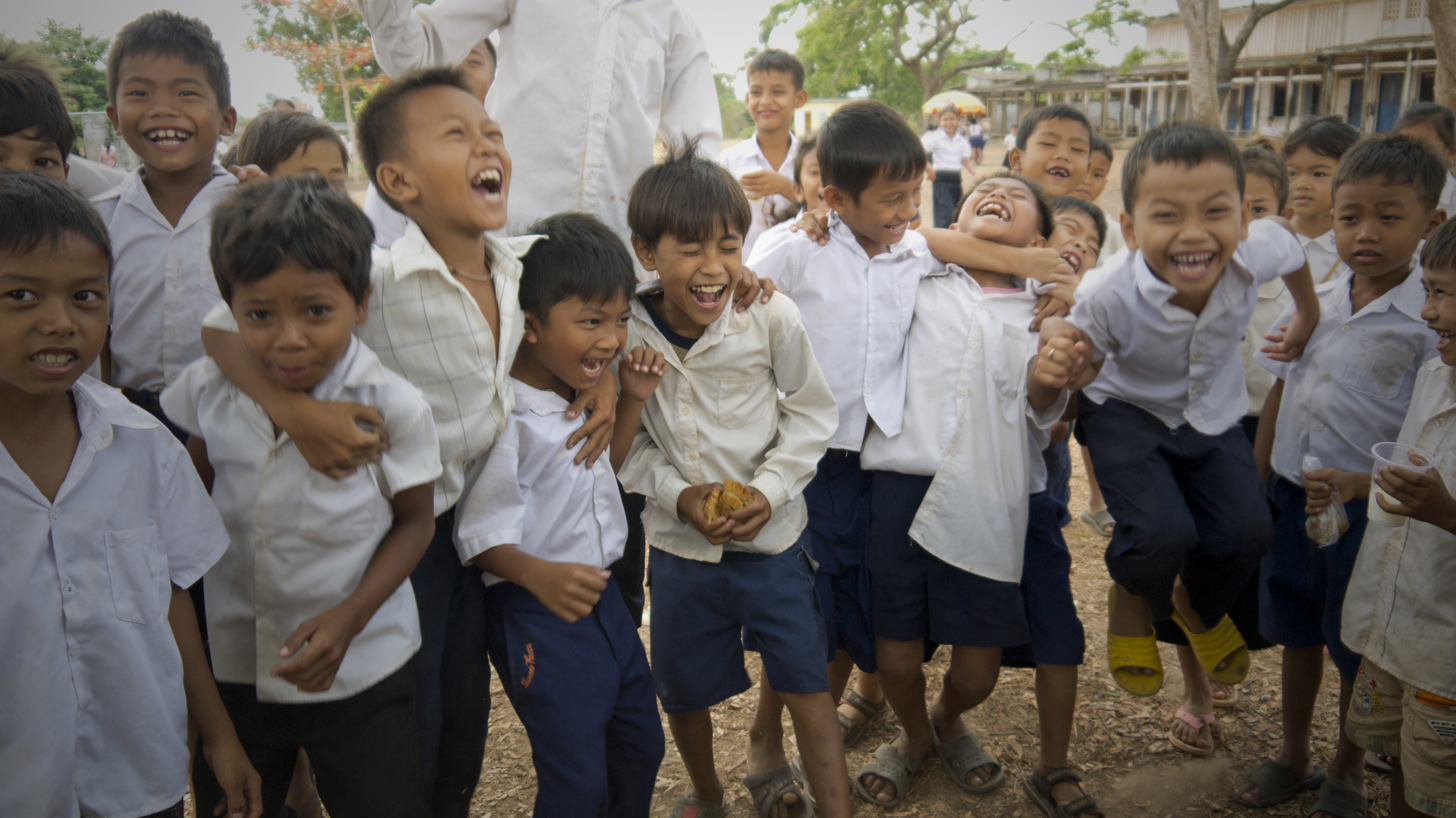
Primary school kids in Kampot province.

A Cambodian child may be nursed until two to four years of age. Up to the age of three or four, the child is given considerable physical affection and freedom. Children around five years of age also may be expected to help look after younger siblings. Children's games emphasize socialization or skill rather than winning and losing.

Normally, children start school when they reach the age of 6 years old. By the time they reach this age, they are familiar with the society's norms of politeness, obedience, and respect toward their elders and toward Buddhist monks. The father at this time begins his permanent retreat into a relatively remote, authoritarian role. By age ten, a girl is expected to help her mother in basic household tasks; a boy knows how to care for the family's livestock and can do farm work under the supervision of older males. Adolescent children usually play with members of the same sex. During his teens, a boy may become a temple servant and go on to serve a time as a novice monk, which is a great honor for the parents.

In pre-communist days, parents exerted complete authority over their children until the children were married, and the parents continued to maintain some control well into the marriage. Age difference is strictly recognized with polite vocabulary and special generational terms for "you".

=== Courtship, marriage, and divorce ===
In Cambodia, premarital sex is deplored. The choice of a spouse is a complex one for the young male, and it may involve not only his parents and his friends, as well as those of the young woman, but also a matchmaker and a haora (a Khmer "fortuneteller" versed in Indian astrology). In theory, a girl may veto the spouse her parents have chosen for her. Courtship patterns differ between rural and urban Khmer; marriage as a culmination of romantic love is a notion that exists to a much greater extent in larger cities.

A man usually marries between the ages of nineteen and twenty-five, a girl between the ages of sixteen and twenty-two. After a spouse has been selected, each family investigates the other to make sure its child is marrying into a good family. In rural areas, there is a form of bride-service; that is, the young man may take a vow to serve his prospective father-in-law for a period of time. By tradition, the youngest daughter and her spouse are expected to live with and care for her ageing parents and their land.

The traditional wedding is a long and colorful affair. Formerly it lasted three days, but in the 1980s it more commonly lasted a day and a half. Buddhist priests offer a short sermon and recite prayers of blessing. Parts of the ceremony involve ritual hair cutting, tying cotton threads soaked in holy water around the bride's and groom's wrists, and passing a candle around a circle of happily married and respected couples to bless the union. After the wedding, a banquet is held. Newlyweds traditionally move in with the wife's parents and may live with them up to a year, until they can build a new house nearby.

The majority of married Cambodian couples do not obtain legal marriage documents. Marriage is seen more as a social institution, regulated by societal pressures, expectations and norms, than a legal matter. This practice continues today. All that is necessary for a couple to be considered married by the community is to have a ceremony, after which a party is often held for family, friends and well-wishers to celebrate. This is how the overwhelming majority of Cambodian couples marry. Whether these traditional marriages are considered legal contracts by the government and courts is unclear. Therefore, when a couple separate, they likewise need not obtain divorce documents.

Divorce is legal and relatively easy to obtain, but not common. Divorced persons are viewed with some disapproval. Each spouse retains whatever property he or she brought into the marriage, and jointly-acquired property is divided equally. Divorced persons may remarry, but the woman must wait 300 days according to article 9 of Marriage and Family Law. Custody of minor children is usually given to the mother, and both parents continue to have an obligation to contribute financially toward the rearing and education of the child. The divorced male does not have a waiting period before he can remarry.

The consequences of the social upheaval caused by the Cambodian Civil War are still being felt. At present there is variation in tradition from province to province. In Siem Reap, it is widely understood, for example, that the man takes the first-born child upon separation. Men who leave their families typically do not support their other children, especially when they leave one woman for another woman. The new woman and her family will not accept children from a previous relationship. This is also an important source of the 70% or so of non orphans living in fake orphanages around cities in Cambodia which are tourist focal points.

=== Social organization ===
Khmer culture is very hierarchical. The greater a person's age, the greater the level of respect that must be granted to them. Cambodians are addressed with a hierarchical title corresponding to their seniority before the name. When a married couple becomes too old to support themselves, they may invite the youngest child's family to move in and to take over running the household. At this stage in their lives, they enjoy a position of high status.

The individual Khmer is surrounded by a small inner circle of family and friends who constitute his or her closest associates, those he would approach first for help. The nuclear family, consisting of a husband and a wife and their unmarried children, is the most important kin group. Within this unit are the strongest emotional ties, the assurance of aid in the event of trouble, economic cooperation in labor, sharing of produce and income, and contribution as a unit to ceremonial obligations. In rural communities, neighbors—who are often also kin—may be important, too.

In Cambodia, imaginary child-parent, sibling, and close friend relationships help strengthen interpersonal and intra-family bonds beyond the boundaries of kinship. Beyond this close circle, there are also distant relatives and casual friends.In rural Cambodia, besides the core family and close friends, the strongest bonds a Khmer can form are with other members of the local community. A strong sense of pride in one's village, district, and province is generally a feature of Cambodian social life.

Legally, the husband is the head of the Khmer family, but the wife has considerable authority, especially in family economics. The husband is responsible for providing shelter and food for his family; the wife is generally in charge of the family budget, and she serves as the major ethical and religious model for the children, especially the daughters. Both husbands and wives are responsible for domestic economic tasks.

=== Customs ===
In Khmer culture a person's head is believed to contain the person's soul—therefore making it taboo to touch or point one's feet at it. It is also considered to be extremely disrespectful to use the feet to point out a person, or to sit or sleep with the soles of the feet pointing at a person, as the feet are the lowest part of the body and are considered to be impure.

When greeting people or to show respect in Cambodia people do the "sampeah" gesture, identical to the Indian namaste and Thai wai.

Customary Cambodian teachings are laid out in verse form in long works from the 14th to 18th centuries collectively called Chhbap ("rules" or "codes"). These were traditionally learned by rote. Works such as the Chhbap Pros ("Boy's Code"), Chhbap Srey ("Girl's Code") and Chhbap Peak Chas ("Code of Ancient Words") gave such advice as: a person that does not wake up before sunrise is lazy; a child must tell parents or elders where they go and what time they will return home; always close doors gently, otherwise a bad temper will be assumed; sit in a chair with the legs straight down and not crossed (crossing the legs is a mark of an impolite person); and always let the other person do more talking.

In Cambodia it is not polite to make eye contact with someone who is older or someone who is considered a superior.

== Clothing ==
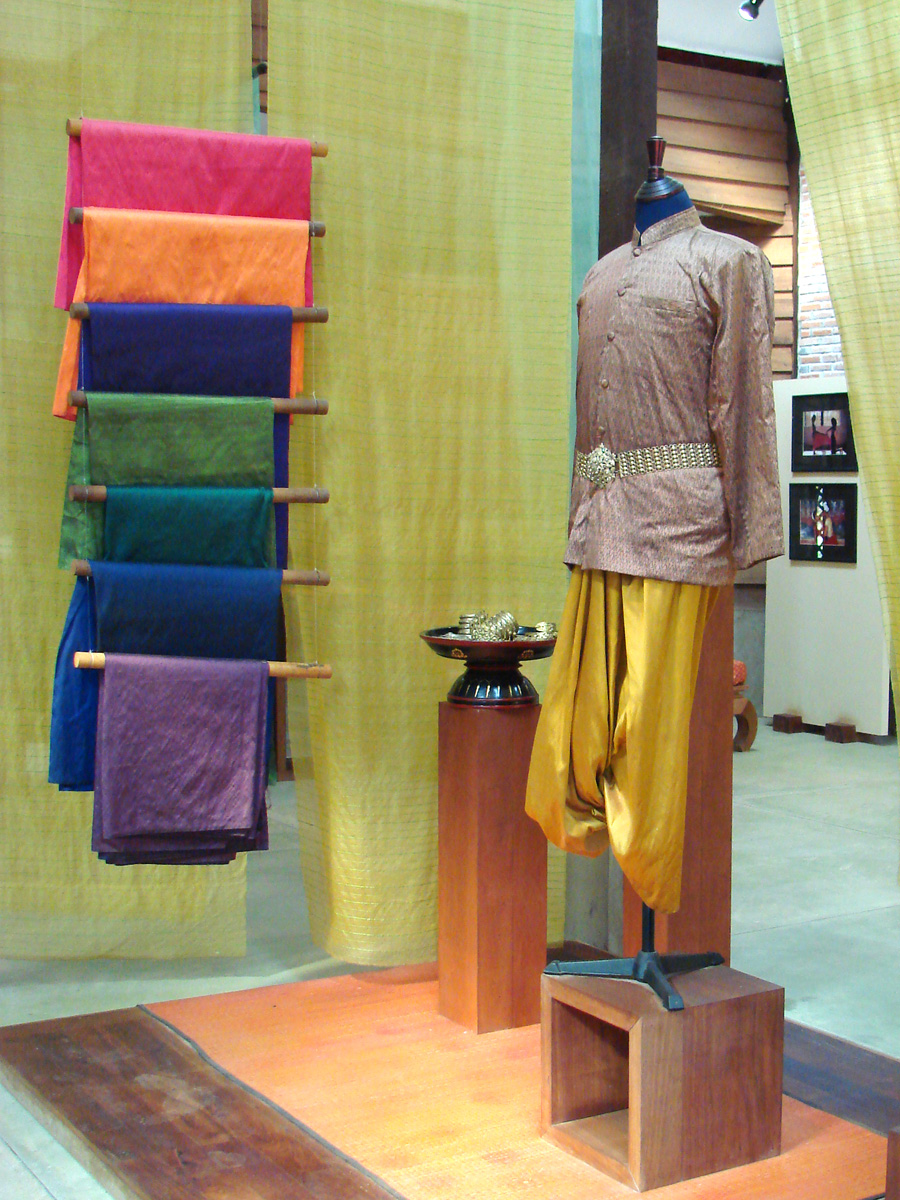
Traditional male clothing

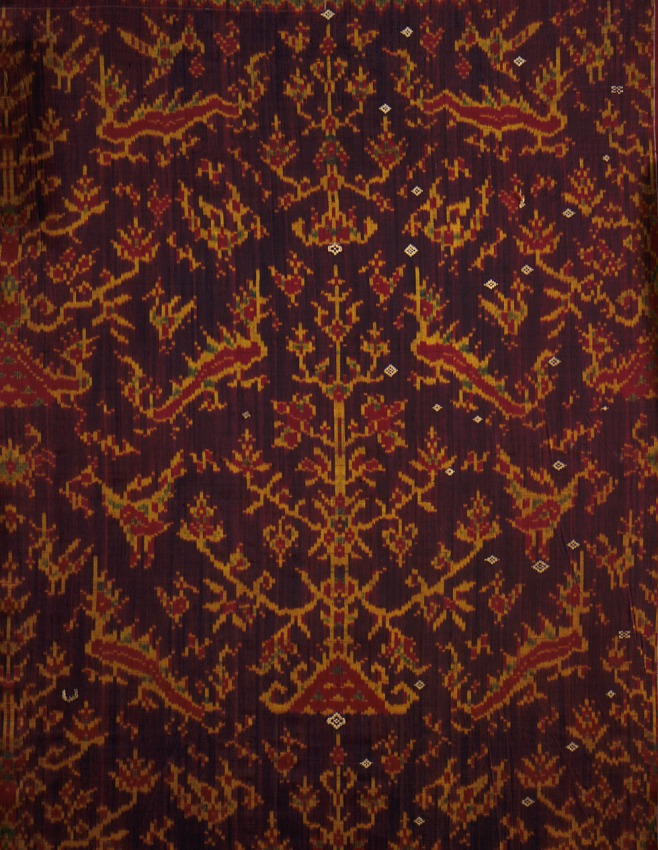
Cambodian Pidan

Clothing in Cambodia is one of the most important aspects of the culture. Cambodian fashion differs according to ethnic group and social class. Khmer people traditionally wear a checkered scarf called a Krama. The "krama" is what distinctly separates the Khmer (Cambodians) from their neighbors the Thai, the Vietnamese, and the Laotians. The scarf is used for many purposes including for style, protection from the sun, an aid (for the feet) when climbing trees, a hammock for infants, a towel, or as a "sarong". A "krama" can also be easily shaped into a small child's doll for play. Under the Khmer Rouge, krama of various patterns were part of standard clothing.

The long-popular traditional garment known as the Sampot, is an Indian-influenced costume which Cambodians have worn since the Funan era. Historically, Khmer clothing has changed depending on the time period and religion. From the Funan era to the Angkor Era, there was a strong Hindu influence in Cambodian fashion which favored wearing Sampots over the lower body and oftentimes nothing from the waist up except jewelry including bracelets and collars such as the Sarong Kor, a symbol of Hinduism.

As Buddhism began to replace Hinduism, Khmer people started wearing the blouse, shirt and trousers of Khmer style. Khmer people, both common and royal, stopped wearing the Hindu-style collars and began to adopt beautiful decorated shawls such as Sbai instead. This new clothing style was popular in the Udong period. In fact, a Khmer lady habitually chooses the right colour for her Sampot or blouse, both to please herself and to follow the costume of good luck.

Some Cambodians still wear a religious style of clothing. Some Khmer men and women wear a Buddha pendant on a necklace. There are different pendants for different uses; some are meant for protection from evil spirits, some are meant to bring good luck. Otherwise, in the notable class people in Cambodia, especially the royal caste, have adapted a well known dress as well as expensive fashion style. Sampot is still well recognized among the royalty. Since the Udong period, most royalty have retained their dressing habits. Female royalty created the most attractive fashion. The lady always wears a traditional cape called sbai or rabai kanorng, which is draped over the left shoulder, leaving the right shoulder bare. Rarely was the cape worn over the right shoulder. The sbai or rabai kanorng would have been sumptuously fashioned in the old days in threads of genuine gold or silver. The cape in the old days would have hung down to the hem of the Sampot.

Dancers wear a collar known as Sarong Kor around their necks. Importantly, they wear a unique skirt called Sampot sara-bhap (lamé), made from silk inter-woven with gold or silver threads, forming elaborate and intricate designs that shimmer as the dancers move. This is held in place with a bejewelled belt. A multitude of jewellery is also worn by the female dancers. These include earrings, several pairs of bangles, a garland of flowers in the form of a bracelet, bracelets, anklets and an armlet that is worn on the right. Several body chains cross over the body like a sash. A circular or diamond-shaped pendant is worn around the neck.

There are several different types of mokot worn by female royalty. The typical mokots that are worn are much similar to those of male royalty. Some crowns are just like tiaras where at the back of the mokot hair is let loose, cascading down the back. Other mokots have a few accessories such as earpieces that would sit above the ear and help hold the mokot in place while a comb at the back is just an added accessory. Flowers are also worn on the mokot in the same style, but the hanging garlands of flowers are worn on the left and the bouquet is worn on the right. The best example of these royal clothes is illustrated by Khmer classical dance costumes, which are an adaptation of the royalty costume.

== Cuisine ==
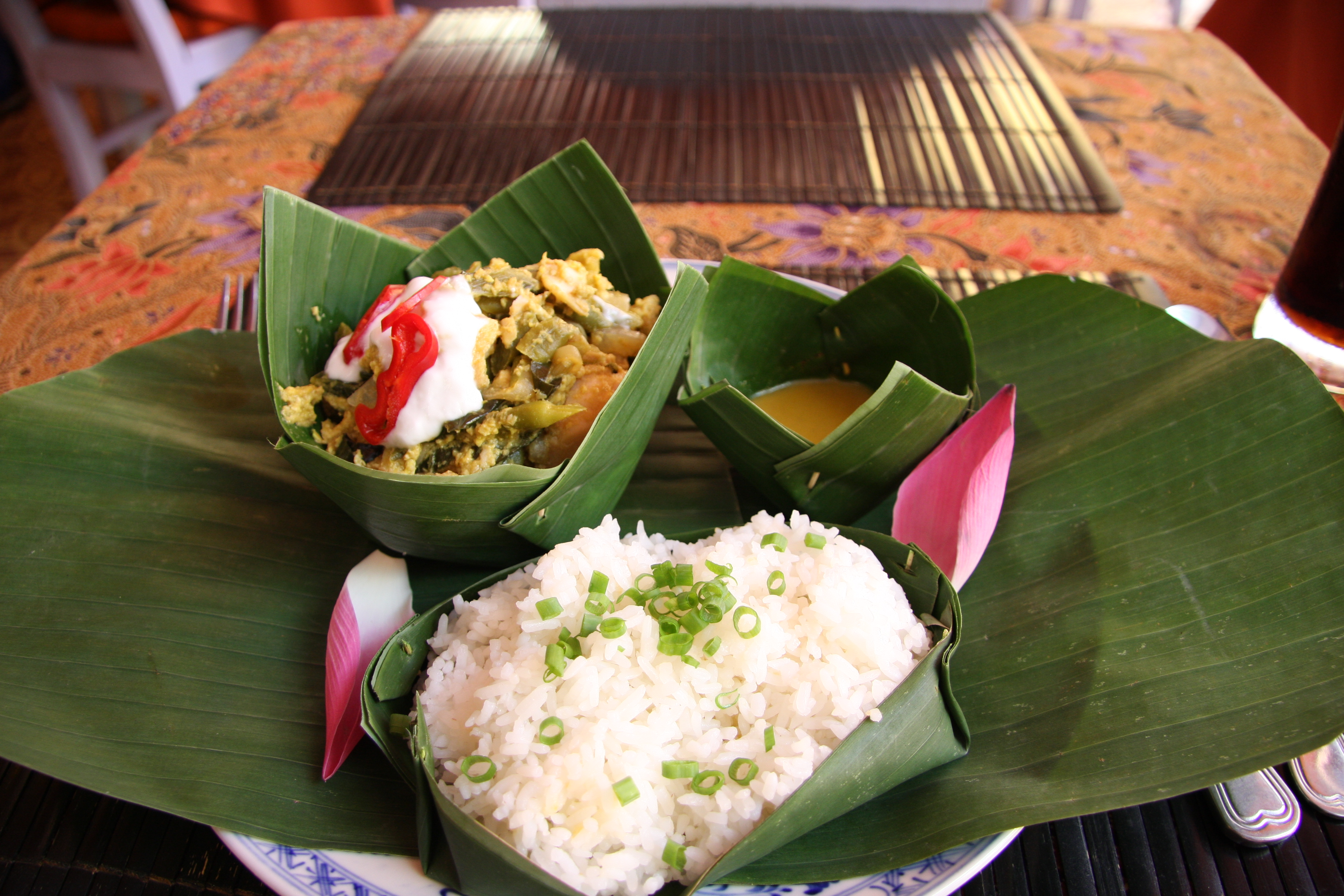
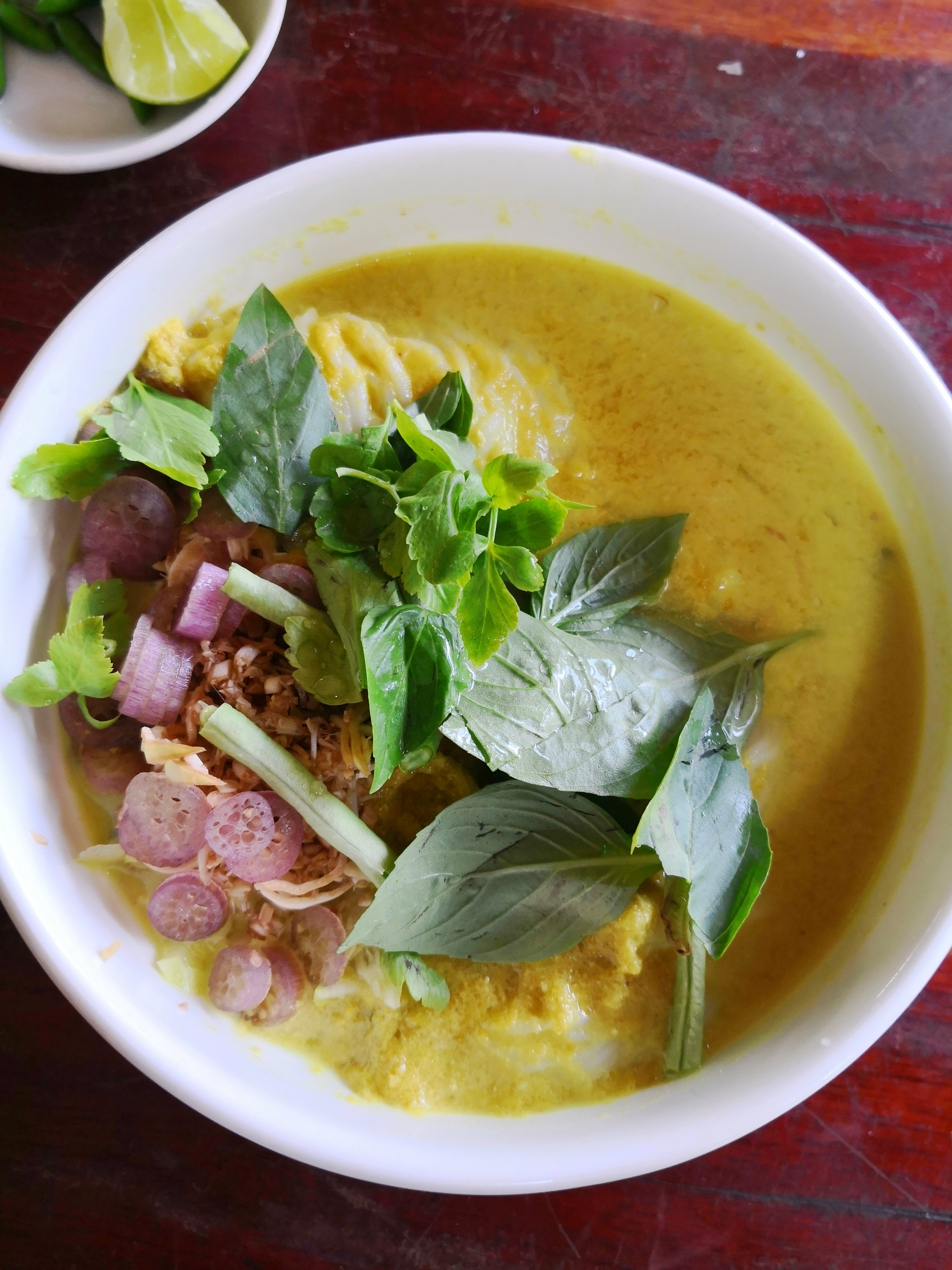
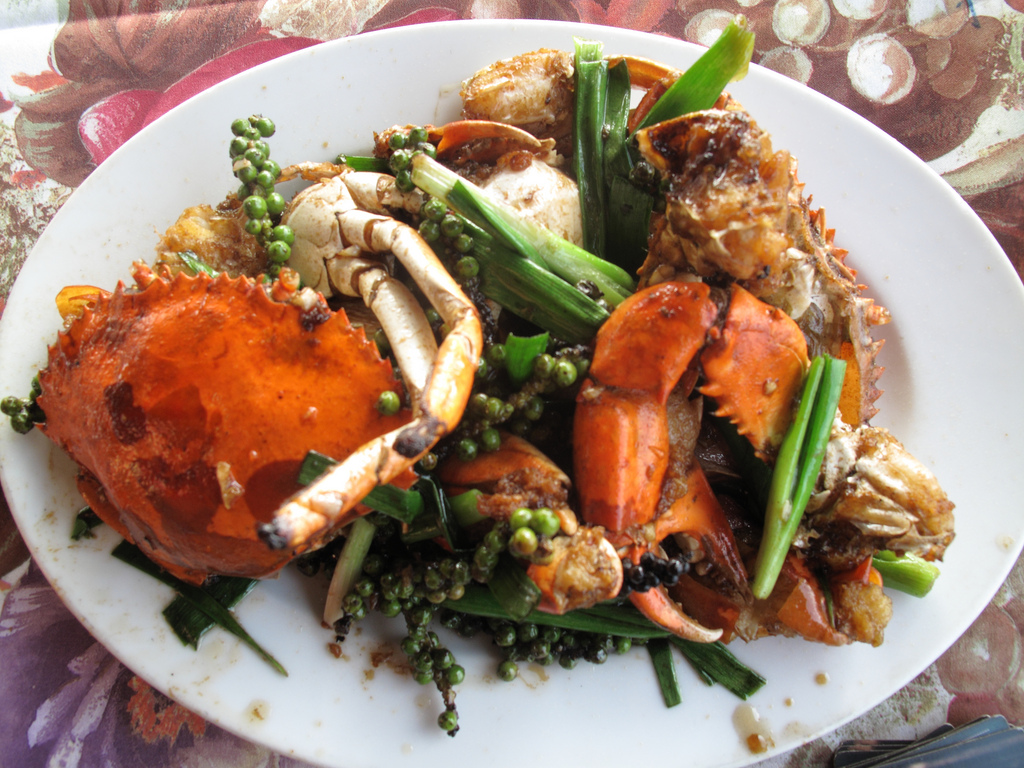
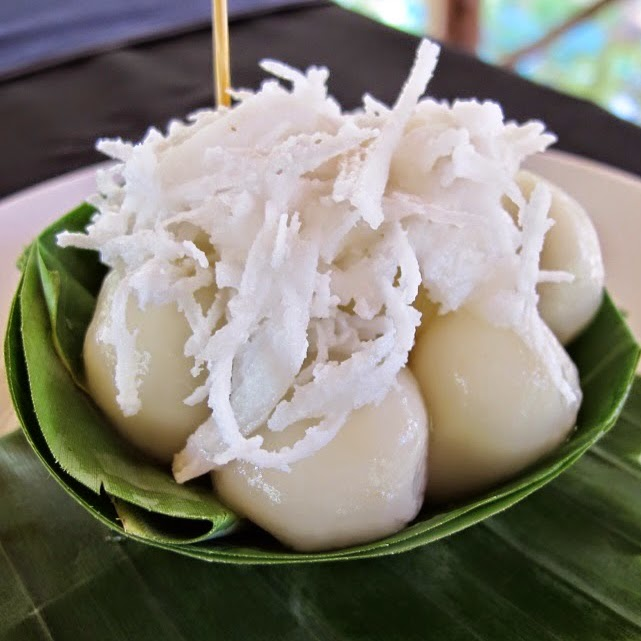
Clockwise from top left: Fish amok, Num banhchok, Kampot pepper crab and num phle ay.

Due to the sustained historic interaction and shared influences, Cambodian cuisine has many similarities with its neighbouring Southeast Asian cuisines of Thailand, Laos, Vietnam, and Indonesia. Cambodian cuisine is known for using fish sauce in soups, stir-fried cuisine, and as dippings. The Chinese influence can be noted in the common chha (Khmer: ឆា, Stir frying) and in the use of many variations of rice noodles. In Chinese-Cambodian cuisine, a popular dish is a "pork broth rice noodle soup", called kuyteav (Khmer: គុយទាវ). Indian influenced dishes include many types of curry known as kari (Khmer: ការី) that call for dried spices such as star anise, cardamom, cinnamon, nutmeg and fennel as well as local ingredients like lemongrass, garlic, kaffir lime leaves, shallots and galangal that give dishes a distinctive Cambodian flavor. Banh chhaev (Khmer: បាញ់ឆែវ), the Khmer version of the Vietnamese bánh xèo, is also a popular dish.

Khmer cuisine is noted for the use of prahok (ប្រហុក), a type of fermented fish paste, in many dishes as a distinctive flavoring. When prahok is not used, it is likely to be kapi (កាពិ) instead, a kind of fermented shrimp paste. Coconut milk is the main ingredient of many Khmer curries and desserts. Cambodians prefer either jasmine rice or sticky (glutinous) rice. The latter is used more in dessert dishes with fruits such as durian while jasmine rice is eaten with meals. Almost every meal is eaten with a bowl of rice. Typically, Cambodians eat their meals with at least three or four separate dishes.

Regional Cambodian cuisine offers some unique dishes influenced by the traditions of local ethnic groups. In Kampot and Kep, known for its Stir-fried crab with Kampot peppercorn (Khmer: ក្តាមឆាម្រេចខ្ជី, kdam chha mrech Kampot). This dish is prepared with a local crab fried with the black pepper from area pepper fields. Kula people, an ethnic group of Pailin Province, originated Kola noodles (Khmer: មីកុឡា, mi Kola), a vegetarian rice stick noodle dish. In southeastern Cambodia, banh trang (បាញ់ត្រាង), the influence of Vietnamese cuisine are strong, evidenced by bánh tráng which is ubiquitous in southeastern Cambodia but virtually unknown elsewhere. The region between Siem Reap and Kampong Thom, an area with many Chinese Cambodians, displays Khmer versions of many Chinese dishes.

== Arts and literature ==
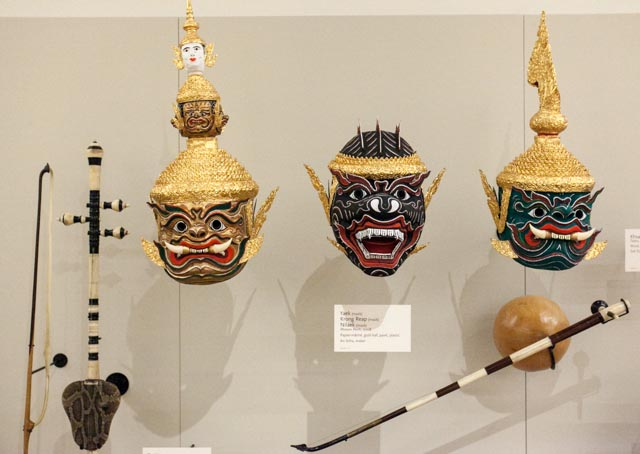
Khmer musical instruments and theatre masks

=== Visual arts ===
The history of visual arts in Cambodia stretches back centuries to ancient crafts; Khmer art reached its peak during the Angkor period. Traditional Cambodian arts and crafts include textiles, non-textile weaving such as Cambodian mats, silversmithing, stone carving, lacquerware, ceramics, wat murals, and kite-making. Beginning in the mid-20th century, a tradition of modern art began in Cambodia, though in the later 20th century both traditional and modern arts declined for several reasons, including the killing of artists by the Khmer Rouge. The country has experienced a recent artistic revival due to increased support from governments, NGOs, and foreign tourists.

=== Music ===
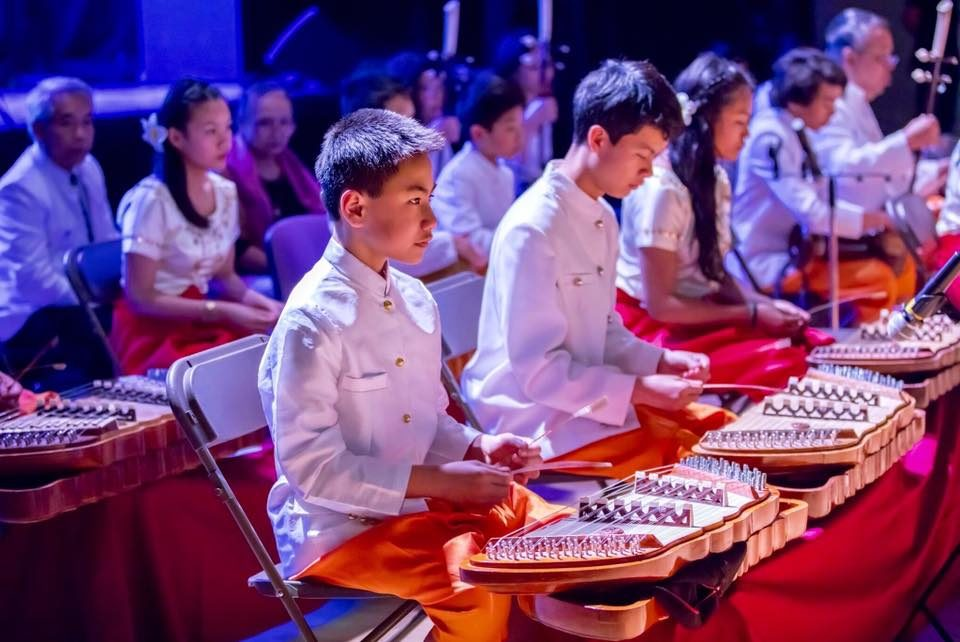
Traditional Khmer music performance

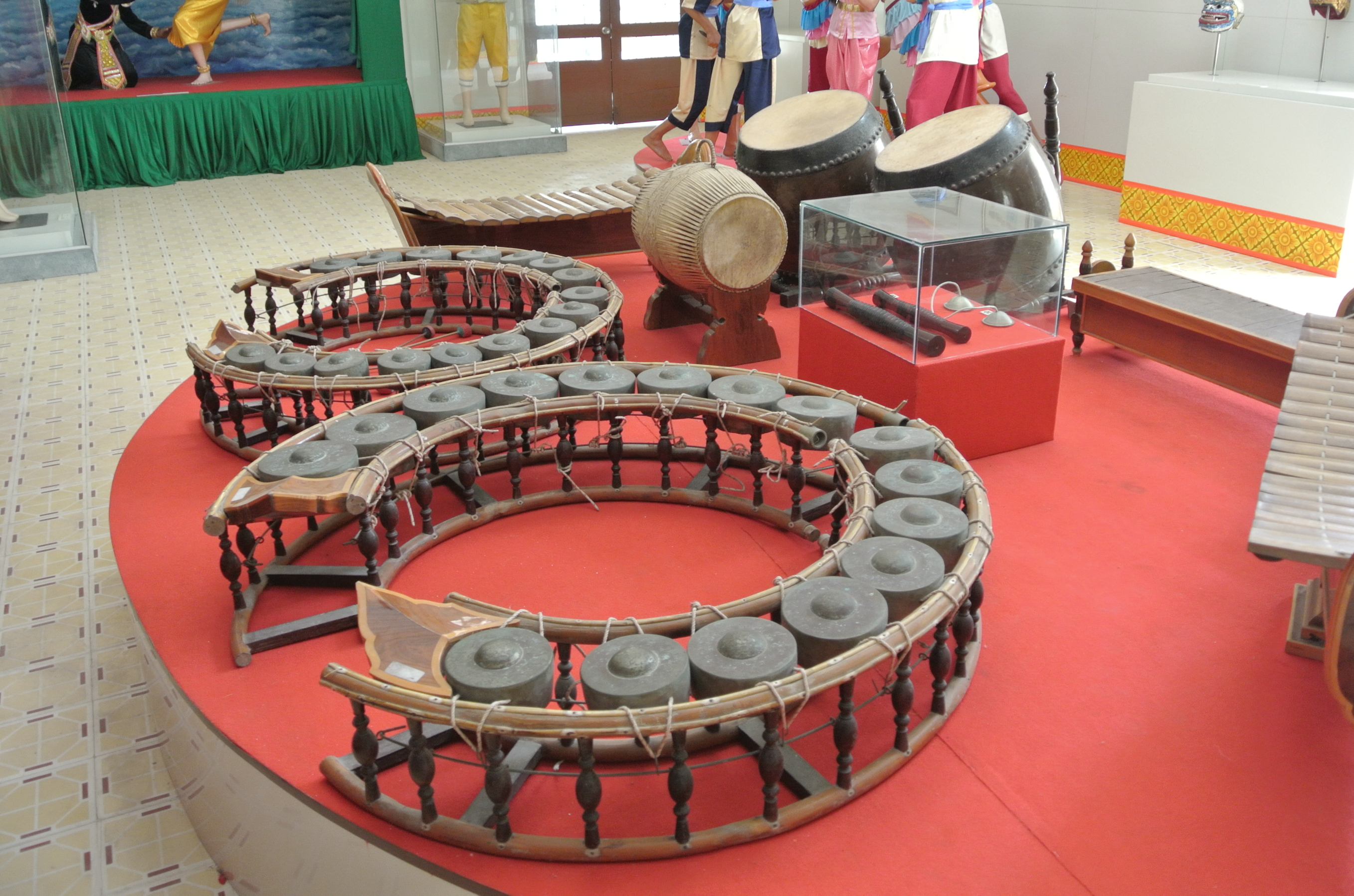
Cambodian musical instruments

Especially in the 60s and 70s, the 'big two' duet of Sinn Sisamouth and Ros Serey Sothea had been a large hit in the country. However, after their deaths, new music stars have tried to bring back the music. Cambodian music has undergone heavy Westernization.

The Cambodian pinpeat ensemble is traditionally heard on feast days in the pagodas. It is also a court ensemble used to accompany classical dance for ritual occasions or theatrical events. The pinpeat is primarily made up of percussion instruments: the roneat ek (lead xylophone), roneat thung (low bamboo xylophone), kong vong touch and kong vong thom (small and large sets of tuned gongs), sampho (two-sided drum), skor thom (two large drums), and sralai (quadruple-reed instrument).

=== Dance ===
Cambodian dance can be divided into three main categories: classical dance, folk dances, and vernacular dances.

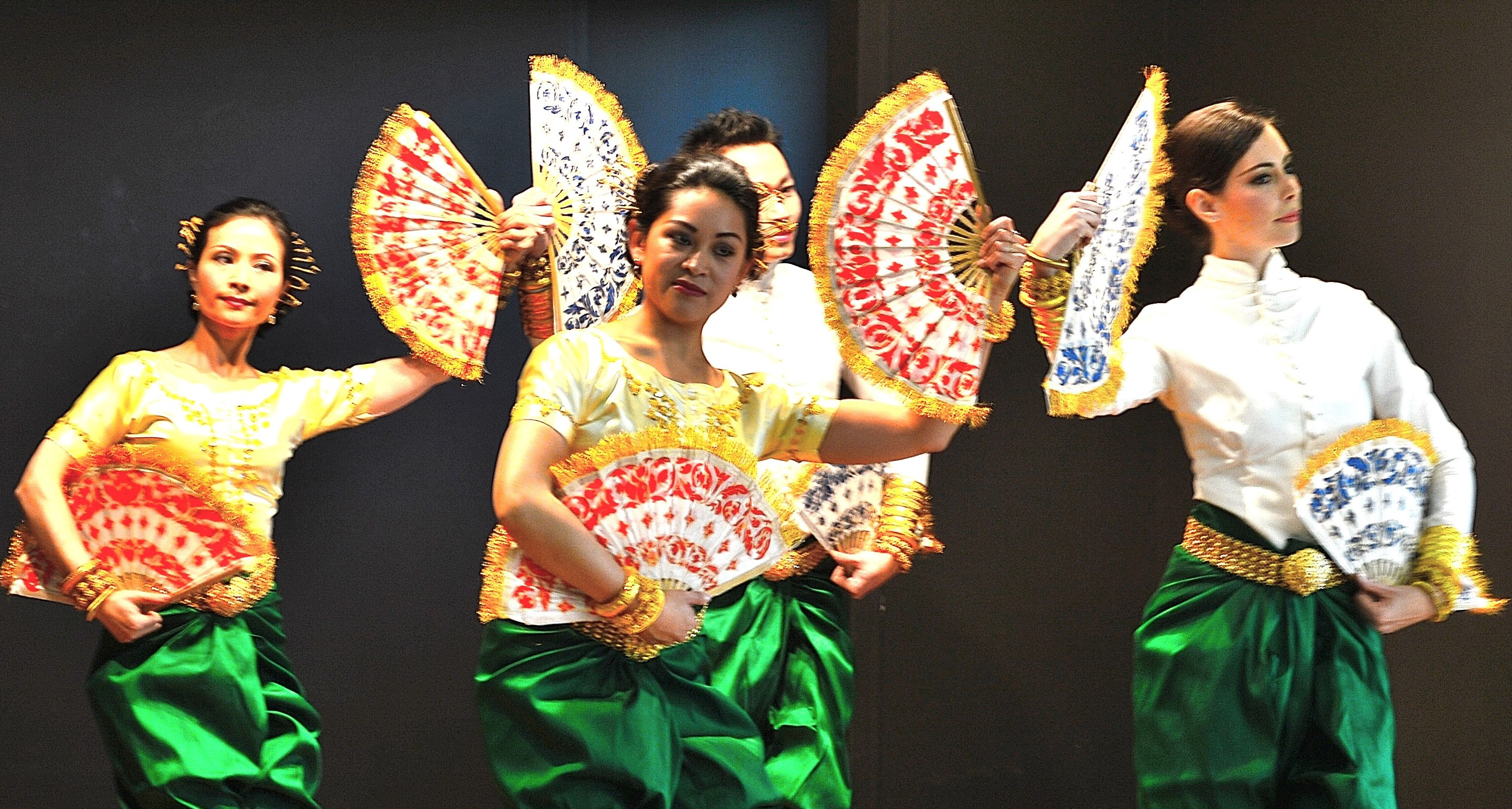
Khmer folk dance

Khmer classical dance is a form of Cambodian dance originally performed only for royalty. The dances have many elements in common with Thai classical dance. In the post-Angkor period of Cambodia, from the early 15th century to 1863, Cambodia was heavily influenced by Siamese art and culture. During the mid-20th century, it was introduced to the public, where it now remains a celebrated icon of Khmer culture, often being performed during public events, holidays, and for tourists visiting Cambodia. Khmer classical dance is famous for its use of the hands and feet to express emotion; there are 4,000 different gestures in this type of dance. Khmer classical dance, also known as the royal ballet of Cambodia, has been selected as one of UNESCO's Masterpieces of the Oral and Intangible Heritage of Humanity. Khmer folk dances, which are performed for audiences, are fast-paced. The movements and gestures are not as stylized as Khmer classical dance. Folk dancers wear clothes of the people they are portraying such as Chams, hill tribes, farmers, and peasants. The folk dance music is played by a mahori orchestra. A popular folk dance is the Cambodian coconut dance which is a dance performance involving coconuts with male and female dancers. The dance originated around 1960 from Romeas Haek District in Svay Rieng Province.

Cambodian vernacular dances (or social dances) are those danced at social gatherings. Such dances include Romvong, Rom Kbach, Rom Saravan, and Lam Leav. Some of these dances have been influenced by the traditional dances of Laos. Other dances, such as Rom Kbach, borrow heavily from the classical dance of the royal court. Other social dances from around the world have influenced Cambodian social culture including the cha-cha, the bolero and the Madison.

=== Literature ===
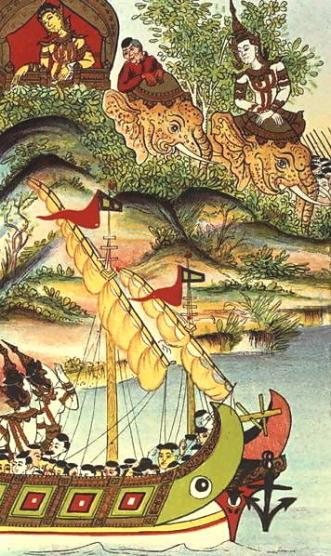
The tale of Vorvong & Sorvong illustration, a Khmer 19th century drawing.

A testimony of the antiquity of the Khmer language are the multitude of epigraphic inscriptions on stone. The first written proof that has allowed the history of the Khmer Kingdom to be reconstructed are those inscriptions. These writings on columns, stelae and walls throw light on the royal lineages, religious edicts, territorial conquests and internal organization of the kingdom.

Following the stone inscriptions, some of the oldest Khmer documents are translations and commentaries of the Pali Buddhist texts of the Tripitaka. They were written by the monks on palmyra palm leaves and kept in various monasteries throughout the country.

The Reamker (Khmer: រាមកេរ្តិ៍, "Rama's Fame") is the Cambodian version of the Ramayana, the famous Indian epic. The Reamker is composed in rhymed verses and is staged in sections that are adapted to dance movements interpreted by Khmer artists. The Reamker is the most ubiquitous form of traditional Cambodian theatre.

Cambodia had a rich and varied traditional oral literature. There are many legends, tales and songs of very ancient origin that were not put into writing until the arrival of the Europeans. One of the most representative of these tales was the story of Vorvong and Sorvong (Vorvong and Saurivong), a long story about two Khmer princes that was first put into writing by Auguste Pavie. This French civil servant claimed that he had obtained the story from old Uncle Nip in Somrontong District. This story was put into writing in Battambang. In 2006 the Vorvong and Sorvong story was enacted in dance form by the Royal Ballet of Cambodia.

Tum Teav, which has been compared to Shakespeare's Romeo and Juliet, is probably the most well-known indigenous story, based on a poem first written by a Khmer monk named Sam. A tragic love story set during the Lovek era, it has been told throughout Cambodia since at least the middle of the 19th century. The story has been portrayed in many forms including oral, historical, literary, theatre, and film adaptions. Tum Teav also has played a role in Cambodia's education, appearing as a topic for the 12th-grade Khmer language examination several times. Although a translation into French had already been made by Étienne Aymonier in 1880, Tum Teav was popularized abroad when writer George Chigas translated the 1915 literary version by the venerable Buddhist monk Preah Botumthera Som or Padumatthera Som, known also as Som, one of the best writers in the Khmer language.

Some talented members of Khmer royalty such as King Ang Duong (1841–1860) and King Thommaracha II (1629–1634) have produced lasting works of literature as well. King Thomaracha wrote a highly esteemed poem for younger Cambodians. The prolific King Ang Duong is most famous for his novel Kakey, inspired from a Jataka tale about an unfaithful woman. While not written as a work of instruction, Kakey is often used as an example to teach young Khmer girls about the importance of fidelity.

=== Shadow Theatre ===
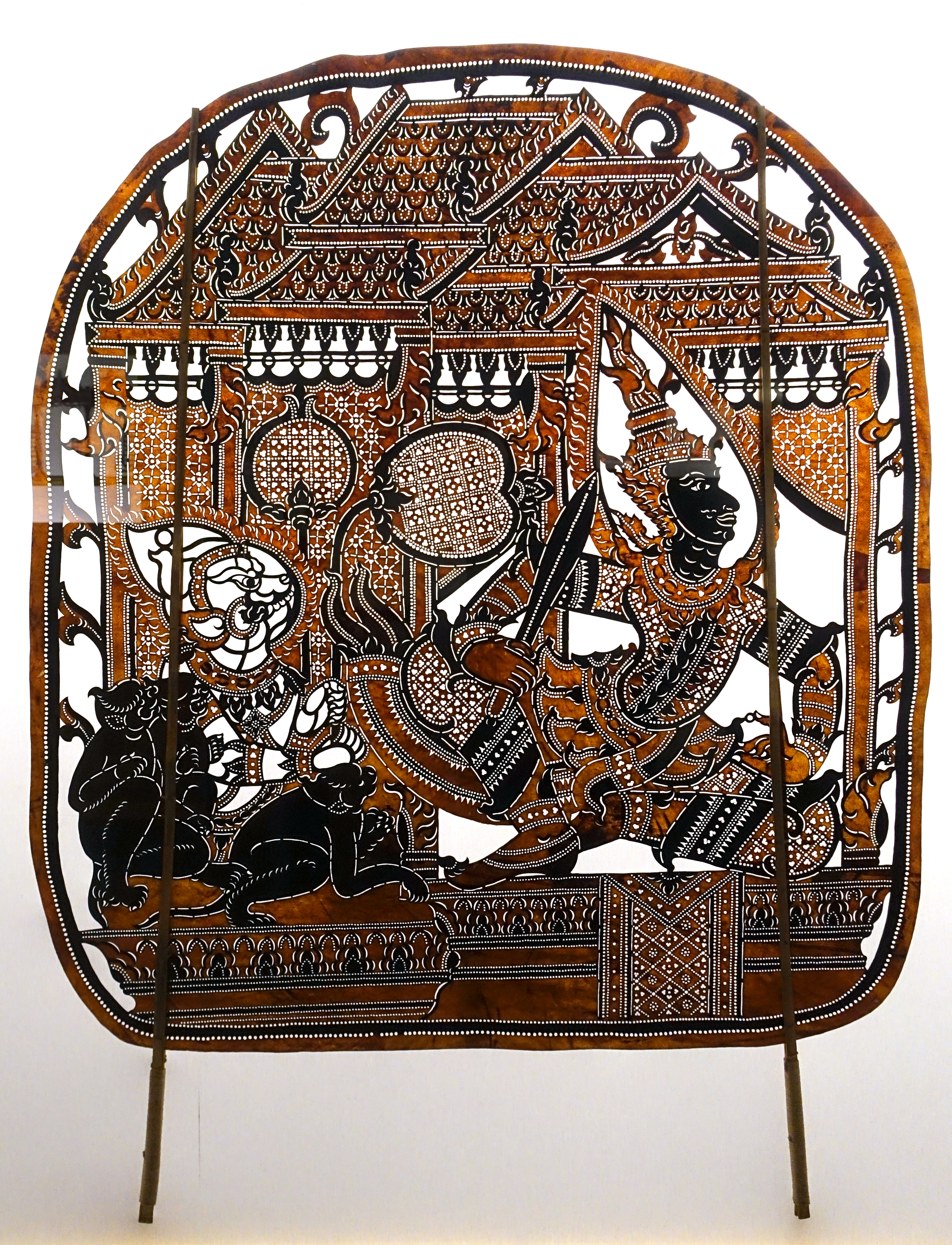
Nang Sbek Thom figure plate.

Nang Sbek (shadow theatre) (or Lakhaon Nang Sbek; Khmer) is closely related to the Nang Yai of Thailand, Wayang and Indonesia like the islands of Java and Bali, thus implying that Nang Sbek may have an Indonesian origin many centuries ago. Nang Sbek is also a dying art form and may disappear because of the decline in popularity due to the introduction of modern entertainment. Before the spread of modern entertainment such as movies, videos and television the Khmer enjoyed and watched shadow theatre apart from the other sources of entertainment available during that time. There are three kinds of shadow theatre in Cambodia:

- Nang Sbek Thom is an art that involves mime, song, music as well as dance and narration to the accompaniment of the Pinpeat orchestra. It most often features the Reamker.
- Nang Sbek Toch also called Nang Kalun and sometimes called Ayang (small shadow theatre) uses smaller puppets and a wide range of stories.
- Sbek Paor (coloured puppet theatre) uses coloured leather puppets.

=== Film ===
Cinema in Cambodia began in the 1950s; King Norodom Sihanouk himself was an avid film enthusiast. Many films were being screened in theaters throughout the country by the 1960s, which are regarded as the "golden age". After a decline during the Khmer Rouge regime, competition from video and television has meant that the Cambodian film industry is relatively weak today.

== Sports and Games ==
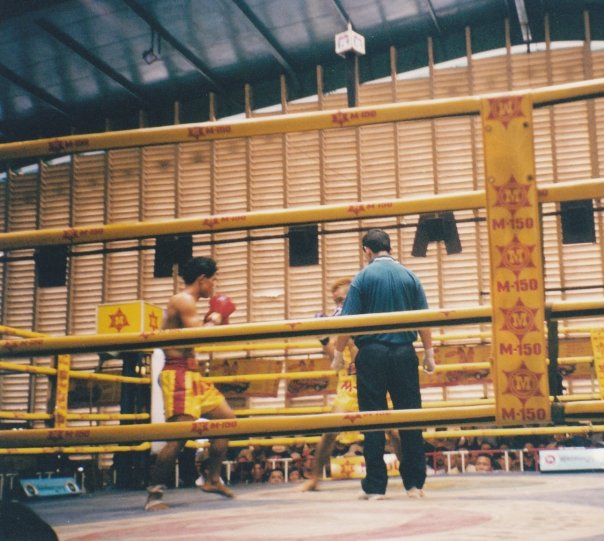
Pradal Serey match

Cambodia has increasingly become involved in sports over the last 30 years. Football is popular as are martial arts, pradal serey (Khmer kick boxing), volleyball, dragon boat racing and Khmer traditional wrestling. Many sports are celebrated during holidays.

Bokator is a traditional Cambodian martial art that dates back over a thousand years. It involves a variety of strikes, kicks, throws, and ground fighting techniques, often inspired by animal movements. It has been added to UNESCO's Intangible Cultural Heritage list in 2022.

Dragon boat racing is a popular sport in Cambodia. The largest sporting event in the country is the boat races at the Bon Om Touk festival.

Pradal serey, or traditional Khmer kickboxing, is a popular sport in Cambodia. It is a combat sport involving clinching and striking. Matches are between young athletic people.

Khmer traditional wrestling is yet another popular Cambodian sport. A wrestling match consists of three rounds, which may be won by forcing an opponent to his back. Traditional matches are held during the Khmer New Year and other Cambodian holidays. Ox cart racing is a sport in Cambodia that takes place during the Khmer New Year. It is done to preserve Cambodian culture.

Football was brought to Cambodia by the French. The Cambodian Football Federation is the governing body of football in Cambodia, controlling the Cambodian national football team. It was founded in 1933, and has been a member of FIFA since 1953, and the Asian Football Confederation (AFC) since 1957. The Cambodian League is the highest level of professional football in the country.

Cambodians play a local version of chess called Ouk Chatrang. Another version of chess called Ouk-Khmer (Hill's version) was thought to have been played in Cambodia.

== See also ==
- Public holidays in Cambodia
- Mass media in Cambodia
- Ministry of Culture and Fine Arts, Cambodia
- Gambling in Cambodia
- Heritage Watch
