= Tboung Khmum district =

Tboung Khmum district ស្រុកត្បូងឃ្មុំ
- District
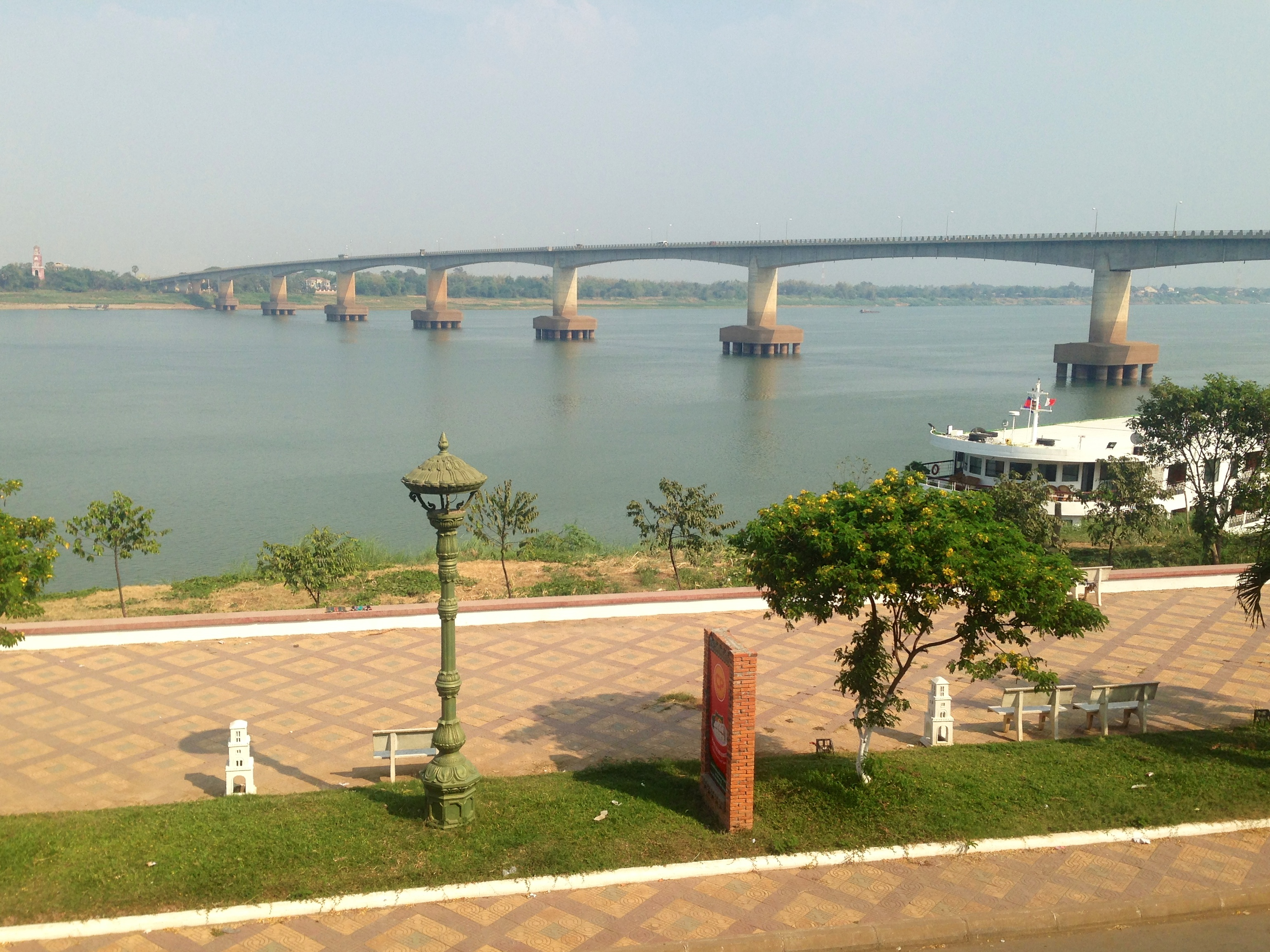
- Kizuna Bridge, opened in 2001, is the first bridge over the Mekong River in Cambodia

- Location in Cambodia
- Coordinates: 11°54′34″N 105°38′49″E
- Country: Cambodia
- Province: Tboung Khmum

Population (1998)
  - Total: 214,780
- Time zone: UTC+7 (ICT)
- Geocode: 2516

Tboung Khmum (Khmer: ស្រុកត្បូងឃ្មុំ, lit. 'The Bee's Gem Pearl') is a district (srok) located in Tboung Khmum province, Cambodia. The district capital is Tboung Khmum town located around 20 kilometres east of the provincial capital of Kampong Cham by road. Tboung Khmum was formerly a central district of Kampong Cham before Tboung Khmum Province was formed from land formerly part of Kampong Cham. The district shares no borders with other provinces and is home to the huge Chup Rubber plantation. The plantation covers much of the land area of the district and contributes a large proportion to the district and provincial economy.

The district is easily accessed by road from Kampong Cham city, Kratie or Prey Veng. Tboung Khmum is one of the largest districts in Tboung Khmum Province both by land area and by population, and only Memot district has a larger area. National Highway 7 bisects the district running from east to west. National Highway 11 runs from Nhek Loeung in Prey Veng province and ends at Slab Kadoung on National Highway 7 in Tboung Khmum district. National road 73 begins near the eastern border of the district and runs north to Chhloung town in Chhloung district in Kratie.

In 2001, the Kizuna bridge was opened in what was then Kampong Cham District. It was the first bridge to be built over the Mekong river in Cambodia. The Kizuna bridge links eastern and western Cambodia by road for the first time. It links the provincial capital of Kampong Cham with Tonle Bet in Tboung Khmum district. Construction of the bridge began in 1999 and took three years to complete. An estimated 10,000 people crowded the bridge for the opening ceremony.

== Tum Teav ==
Tum Teav, the 'Romeo & Juliet' of Cambodian literature, was set in Tboung Khmum district. This epic poem, handed down through the generations by oral poets, was translated into French by Étienne Aymonier in 1880. Palm-leaf versions of the story were recorded by Santhor Mok and the Venerable Botumthera Som. The most recent literary version was composed by Nou Kan. The much-loved story has been adapted to theatre, song and film in recent years.

Tum Teav is a classic tragic love story that has been told throughout Cambodia since at least the middle of the 19th century. It is originally based on a poem and is the considered the "Cambodian Romeo and Juliet" tale. It was popularized by writer George Chigas and has been a compulsory part of the Cambodian secondary national curriculum since the 1950s.

The tale relates the encounters of a talented novice monk named Tum and a beautiful adolescent girl named Teav. From the first sight, Tum, the monk, was in love with Teav, a very beautiful young lady. It is reciprocated and Teav offered Tum some betel nut and a blanket as evidence of the feelings she had for Tum and prays to Buddha that the young monk will be with her for eternity. Tum was very pleased to accept the offers, to see she felt the same way he did. He initially spends some time in Teav's home despite her being 'in the shade' (a period of a few weeks when the daughter is supposedly secluded from males and taught how to behave virtuously), and wastes no time in abusing the mother's hospitality by sleeping with her daughter.

Teav's mother is unaware of this event and has alternative plans, intending to marry her daughter off to the governor's son (she dropped the idea when her daughter was chosen to be with the king, but resurrected it as soon as she learned that her employment at the court wasn't leading anywhere). She feigns illness as a ruse to lure Teav to her village whereupon she tries to coerce her into taking part in the wedding ceremony. Tum turns up with an edict from the king to stop the ceremony, but on arrival instead of presenting the order, he gets drunk, announces he is Teav's husband and kisses her in public; his behaviour results in his murder, and only after that does the governor discover the king's letter. Teav commits suicide.

== Location ==
Tboung Khmum district lies in the west of the province and is surrounded by other Tboung Khmum districts. Reading from the north clockwise, Tbuong Khmoum borders with Krouch Chhmar district to the north. The eastern border of the district is shared with Dambae and Ponhea Kraek districts. Ponhea Kraek wraps around to the southern border of the district where it joins Ou Reang Ov in the south. The Mekong River forms the western border of the district running from north to south and here the river is part of the district to midstream. Across the Mekong are Koh Suotin, Kampong Cham and Kampong Siem districts of neighboring Kampong Cham Province. The large Mekong island of Kaoh Samraong lies in the center of the district's western border.

== Administration ==
The Tboung Khmum district governor reports to the Governor of Tboung Khmum Province. The following table shows the villages of Tboung Khmum district by commune.

Khum (commune)	Phum (villages)
Anhchaeum	Ponley Chuor, Mochchhuem Pheak, Chheu Teal Chrum, Trapeang Chak, Koun Tnaot, Kraoy Voat, Ta Kaeb, Poun, Ae Out, Pou Roung, Ponley Phsar, Angk Kaev, Ta Trav, Damnak Char, Prey Kampeaeng, Eisant Mean Chey, Prey Chongruk, Doung Preah, Rung, Trach, Anhchaeum, Neameun Kheung
Boeng Pruol	Boeng Pruol Leu, Tuol Kampot Ti Muoy, Tuol Kampot Ti Bei, Masin Srov, Vihear Kraom, Bat Dei Kraom, Boeng Kambaor, Tuol Dambang, Speam Chheu, Boeng kak, Boeng Preah
Chikor	Veal, Khtum Kandal, Roka Khmuoch Tboung, Roka Khmuoch Cheung, Slaeng, Veah, Khnach Krasang, Chan Tum, Tuol Kandal Cheung, Chi Kor, Kamraeng, Stueng Penh, Svay Tipv, Khtum Kaeut, Khtum Lech, Sameakki, Tuol Kandal Tboung, Tuol Thmei, Veal Lech
Chirou Ti Muoy	Preaek Touch, Roka Thum, Chirou Kraom Muoy, Chirou Kraom Pir, Chirou Leu, Chirou Kandal, Chuor Kandal, Kampong Ruessei, Tuol Kaev
Chirou Ti Pir	Tuol Vihear, Srae Siem, Tuek Chenh, Aekkapheap, Tuol Ponley, Mream Teak, Andoung Chea, Ta Trav, Chruoy Kor, Boeng Tral, Sampov Phustmei, Sampir
Chob	Chub Ti Muoy, Chub Ti Pir, Chub Krau, Chrak Chambak, Veal Kandieng, Slab Kdaong, Andoung Lve, Tuol Trea Tboung, Tuol Trea Cheung, Tuol Sambour, Phum Dabbuon, Phum Dabpram, Phum Saeprammuoy, Phum Samprammuoy, Phum Sounbuon Sounpram, Phum Sounprammuoy
Kor	Lvea Touch, Seh, Kbal Boeng Seh, Damnak Popel, Kbal Ou, Thnong, Tuol Thmei, Tep Nimitt, Veal Khmum, Kandal, Kor, sambuor, Phum Prambei Dabpram, Phum Prammuoy Dabprammuoy, Toul Vihear Meanchey, Tumnob Senchey, Trapeang Bei, Veal Tuek Chenh, Kbal Boeng Sehkaeut, Sok San
Lngieng	Lngieng, Kokir, Chrab, Smaonh, Lvea Thum, Phum Buon Dabprammuoy, Phum Pir Dabprampir, Tlouk Pongro, Khien Chak
Mong Riev	Trapeang Snao, Chi Peang, Pring, Riev, Thnong, Mong Ti Prampir, Mong Ti Prammuoy, Cheung Khal, Trapeang Krapeu, Poun, Chrouy Changhar
Peam Chileang	Ta Bang, Preaek Phdau, Kampong Chanloh Lech, Chheu Teal Ti Pir, Kampong Chanloh Kaeut, Chheu Teal Touch, Chheu Teal Ti Muoy, Peam Knong, Bat Sla Snab, Pram Damleung, Prekpeam
Roka Po Pram	Chong Ou, Veal Vong, Roka Pram Ti Muoy, Preah Angk, Chant Nimitt, Vihear Sambour, Roka Pram Ti Pir, Chhuk Sandal, Trapeang Khla, Pong Tuek, Ta Pav Bampenh Tes, Praphat, Trapeang Ruessei, Koul, Somrum, PhnomLok, Dab Dabmuoy, Prambei Dabmuoy
Sralab	Chan Toung, Trabos, Trapeang Thum, Prayab, Sangkom Thmei, Angkor Chea, Sralab, Dang Kambet, Khlaong, Trapeang Dom, Khnar, Angkor Chey, Veal Khnach, Nikom Leu, Pratheat, Trapeang Kur, Nikom Kraom, Andoung Pok, Kien Romiet, Trapeang Sangkae
Thma Pechr	Thma Pech Ti Muoy, Thma Pech Ti Pir, Thma Pech Ti Bei, Peuk, Roung kou, Doung, Chies Ti Muoy, Chies Ti Pir, Chambak, Kok, Phum Prammuoy Prampir, Phum Prambei Dab, Phum Prambei Prampir, PhumDab Prambei, Toul Oupir
Tonle Bet	Andoung Poung, Chrouy Sralau, Phnum, Ampil Chrum, Tuol Kor, Preaek Touch, Preaek Chik, Tuol Khsach, Doun Mau Kraom, Doun Mau Leu, Tonle Bet Kraom, Tonle Bet Leu, Tahuy, Tonle Bet, Yaysor

== Demographics ==
The district is subdivided into 14 communes (khum) and 194 villages (phum). According to the 1998 Census, the population of the district was 214,780 persons in 41,624 households in 1998. With a population of over 200,000 people, Tboung Khmum district has the largest district populations in Tboung Khmum province by a large margin. The average household size in Tboung Khmum is 5.1 persons per household, which is slightly lower than the rural average for Cambodia (5.2 persons). The sex ratio in the district is 94.4%, with significantly more females than males.
