= Cambodian literature =

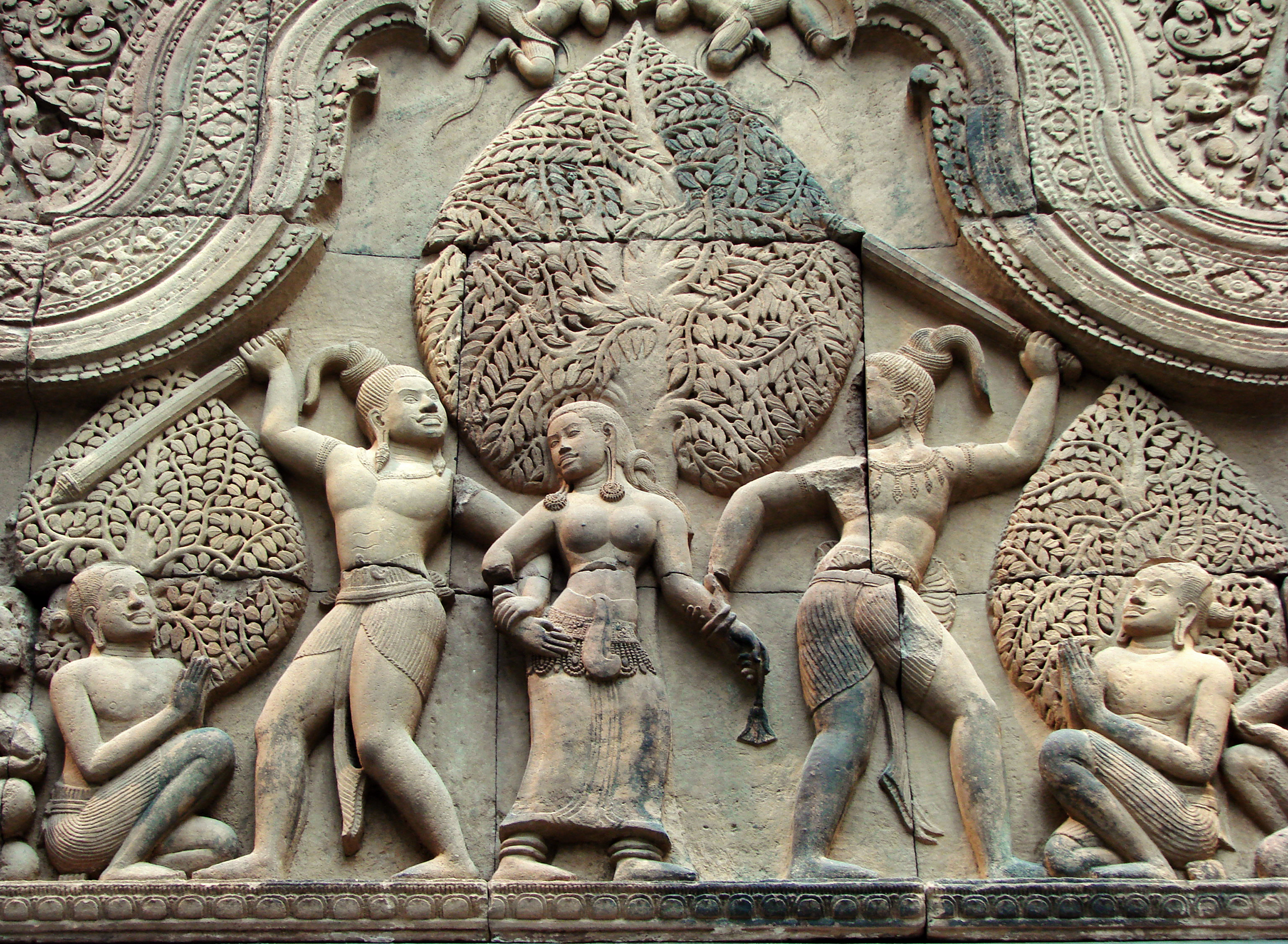
A scene of the Mahabharata in an Angkor Wat stone relief: Two asuras, the brothers Sunda and Upasunda, fight over the possession of the beautiful apsara Tilottama. Some ancient Cambodian local legends were influenced by the Hindu epics.

Cambodian literature (Khmer: អក្សរសាស្ត្រខ្មែរ, Âksârsastr Khmêr [ʔaʔsɒːsah kʰmaɛ]), also Khmer literature, has a very ancient origin. Like most Southeast Asian national literatures its traditional corpus has two distinct aspects or levels:

- The written literature, mostly restricted to the royal courts or the Buddhist monasteries.
- The oral literature, which is based on local folklore. It is heavily influenced by Buddhism, the predominant religion, as well as by the Hindu epics Ramayana and Mahabharata.

== Ancient stone inscriptions ==
A testimony of the antiquity of the Khmer language are the multitude of epigraphic inscriptions on stone. The first written proof that has allowed the history of the Khmer Empire to be reconstructed are those inscriptions.

These writings on columns, stelae and walls throw light on the royal lineages, religious edicts, territorial conquests and internal organization of the kingdom.

== Buddhist texts ==
Following the stone inscriptions, some of the oldest Khmer documents are translations and commentaries of the Pali Buddhist texts of the Tripitaka written in the Khmer script.

These texts were written with stencils by the monks on sugar palm leaves. They were kept in various monasteries throughout the country and many did not escape the destruction of the Khmer Rouge.

== Reamker ==
The Reamker (Rama's legacy) is the Cambodian version of the Ramayana, the famous Indian epic. The Reamker comes in rhymed verses and is staged in sections that are adapted to Cambodian dance movements interpreted by local artists.

The current surviving literary text of Reamker, the Khmer version of Indian epic Ramayana dates to 16th century during the middle period in Khmer History. This Cambodian version was composed anonymously by at least three authors over centuries and divided into two parts. In 16th century, about a fifth of the first part was compiled, covering the main events of the Balakanda and Ayodhyakanda.

In the 17th century, it continued with the story up to Ravana's assembling the remnants of his army for the final battle with Rama. The episodes of Ravana's death, the rescue of Sita and her trial by fire, and the triumphant return of Rama and his troops to Ayodhya, are all missing. On the other hand, the second part of Reamker is believed to have been composed in 18th century which relates those events from Uttarakanda which deal specifically with the later history of Rama and Sita: her second rejection and exile, the birth of their two sons, the meeting again, and Sita going down into the earth. Today, various version of Reamker story can be found in Cambodian library.

The Reamker is the oldest form of Cambodian theatre. The Robam Sovan Macha - a certain dance from the Reamker about Hanuman and Sovanmacha, the golden mermaid, is one of the most renowned pieces of classical dance in Cambodia.

== Court literature ==
King Thommaracha II (1629–1634) wrote a poem directed to the Khmer young generation which is still a well loved traditional piece of poetry.

From the early to mid-nineteenth century, Cambodian court literature was heavily influence by the Siamese (Thai) literature. Many poetic tales and epic poems were translated from the Thai original, and some the Thai "Nirat" poetic tradition was followed by Cambodian noble men.

Cambodian nobleman King Ang Duong (1841–1860) is known in Khmer literature for being not only a king but a famous classical writer in prose. His novel Kakey or Ka key (from the Sanskrit word for a "female crow"), written while he was studying in Siam (Thailand), is inspired by a Thai folk tale Ka Kee, and has elements of regional folktales. It narrates the story about a woman that is unfaithful to her husband and ends up being punished by him for her betrayal. It contains specific moral lessons that were used in texts in Cambodian schools. Kakey social norms were traditionally taught to high-born young Khmer girls and the story's values have cultural relevance even in present times.

Another work by Ang Duong is Puthisen Neang Kong Rei, a novel also inspired in a Jataka tale. It is about Kong Rei, a faithful wife ready to sacrifice her life for her husband Puthisen the son of one of twelve sisters. Khmer poets and songwriters have used the words "Kakey" for a woman who is unfaithful to her man and "Neang Kong Rei" for a very faithful woman.

== Cambodian Royal Chronicles ==
The Cambodian Royal Chronicles or Cambodian Chronicles (Rajabansavatar or Rapa Ksatr) are a collection of 18th and 19th century historical manuscripts that focus on the time from around the year 1430 to the beginning of the 16th century. There exist around thirty-four copies of chronicles in Khmer language, along with three texts transcribed in Latin (systeme des missionaires) in the French National Library. The oldest chronicle, 'The Fragment of Ang Eng' dating to 1796, was also translated into Thai language. It only describes the reign of Param Nibbanapad (or Maha Nibbanapad) (1346-1351) to the reign of Paramaraja I (Cau Bana Yat) (1434-1438).

Further works are the complete chronicle of Ukana Vansa Sarbejn Nan (or Nan in short), the complete chronicle of Samtec Cauva Vamn Juon (or VJ, or Juon in short), the chronicle of Vatt Kok Kak(KK) and the Ampal Ksatr.

== Popular legends ==
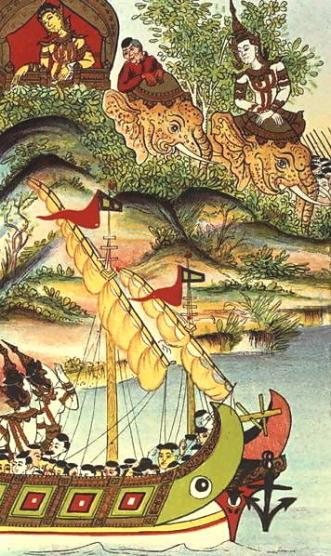
An illustration from the Vorvong and Sorvong tale. Khmer 19th century drawing.

Khmer folklore has a rich and varied oral tradition. There are many popular legends, tales and songs of ancient origin about mythical heroes, heroines and ghosts. These were not put into writing until the 19th and 20th centuries. Before then they had been memorized and told for generations.

Many of these tales borrow features and plots from the Indian epics Ramayana and the Mahabharata, as well as from the Buddhist Jataka tales. They also often show Siamese literary influence.

The oral-tradition legends were often extremely long stories in rhyming verses. The heroes were mostly princes and supernatural beings and the scenarios were often connected to the palaces and the monasteries. One important purpose of these legends and stories handed down for centuries was to transmit norms and values. Most stories emphasize the peaceful resolution of conflicts. References to geographical landmarks and the meanings of the names of Cambodian locations were transmitted through the tales.

One of the most representative of these tales was the story of Vorvong and Sorvong, a long tale of the Khmer oral tradition about two Khmer princes that fell into disgrace who, after a series of ordeals, regain their status. Vorvong and Sorvong was first put into writing by Auguste Pavie as "Vorvong and Saurivong"; this French civil servant claimed that he had obtained the folk legend version he wrote down from an "Old Uncle Nip" in Samraongtong District. The story was put into writing in Battambang. In 2006 the Vorvong and Sorvong story was enacted in dance form by the Royal Ballet of Cambodia.

There are two hills in Kirirom National Park — Phnom Sruoch District and Kampong Speu Province — named after the two heroic princely brothers, Vorvong and Sorvong. Phnom Kong Rei is a local mountain with a Khmer folktale as a reference.

Tum Teav is a classic tragic love story set in Tboung Khmum Province that has been told throughout the country since at least the mid 19th century. It is based on a 17th or 18th century poem of uncertain origin, probably having originated in a more ancient Cambodian folk legend. Nowadays Tum Teav has oral, literary, theatre, and film versions in Khmer. Although its first translation in French was made by Étienne Aymonier in 1880, Tum Teav was popularized abroad when writer George Chigas translated the 1915 literary version by the venerable Buddhist monk Preah Botumthera Som or Padumatthera Som, known also as "Som."

== Modern literature ==
The era of French domination brought about a requestioning of the role of the literature in Cambodia. The first book in the Khmer script in a modern printing press was printed in Phnom Penh in 1908. It was a classical text on wisdom, "The recommendations of Old Mas", published under the auspices of Adhémard Leclère.

The influence of French-promoted modern school education in Cambodia would produce a generation of novelists in the Khmer language beginning in the early decades of the 20th century. These new writers would write in prose, illustrating themes of average Khmer people, set against scenarios of ordinary Cambodian life.

The clean break with the ancient Indian and Siamese influence was not abrupt. Some of the first modern Cambodian literary works keep the influences of the versified traditional literature, like the 1911 novel Toek Roam Phka Roam (ទឹករាំផ្ការាំ; lit. "Dancing Flower and Dancing Water"), 1915 Tum Teav (ទុំទាវ; lit. "Tum and Teav") by the Venerable Som, the 1900 work Bimba bilap (Bimba's Lamentation) by female novelist Sou Seth, or even Dav Ek (ដាវឯក; lit. "Single Sword") by Nou Kan, which appeared in 1942. A New Sun Rises Over the Old Land published in 1962 was the best-seller of the Sangkum era.

=== The Khmer Rouge years and their aftermath ===
Between 1975 and 1977, under Democratic Kampuchea, intellectuals were persecuted. Since Cambodian writers were largely from an urban background, they were among the people expelled from the cities in 1975 after the victory of the Khmer Rouge.

During the years that followed Khmer writers were not able to practice their skill. Like all other intellectuals, they were forced to live like peasants, doing rural farmwork and heavy menial chores. Educated people had to hide their condition and many were murdered when Khmer Rouge cadres found out about their former background. As part of Pol Pot's "struggle against superstition", the Buddhist religion, which ran through most of the traditional Cambodian literature, was repressed and Khmer Rouge cadres put a great effort into wiping away Khmer folklore.

The defeat of Pol Pot's regime and the establishment of the People's Republic of Kampuchea brought about a reinstatement of the Cambodian writers' prestige, as well as a partial restoration of Buddhism as the state religion and a renewed interest in traditions and local folklore. Many intellectuals regained their former status and there was recognition of their achievements as being in line with the national interests. The restoration of cultural life during the PRK, however, was marred by socialist-minded, pro-Soviet and pro-Vietnamese restrictions hampering creativity that would only be lifted towards the end of the 1980s under the SOC.

A weight, nevertheless, had been lifted and following the Khmer Rouge years some writers like Pich Tum Krovil began collecting lost works and writing new Khmer poetry. Novelists such as Vatey Seng (The Price We Paid) or Navy Phim (Reflections of A Khmer Soul) wrote frank accounts of their ordeals under Pol Pot rule as part of a healing process that needed expression.

=== Present-day ===
Somaly Mam (The Road To Lost Innocence) made a bold denunciation of human sex-trafficking through her experiences. She, and other Cambodian authors that gained international attention were able to make some income through their works or translations in foreign languages. Cambodian writers in Khmer, however, still find it difficult to make ends meet. The Khmer Writers' Association was reestablished again in 1993 by two of its former members in order to help struggling Khmer writers.

== See also ==
- Khmer sastra
- Culture of Cambodia
- Dance in Cambodia
- Ministry of Culture and Fine Arts, Cambodia
- Theatre of Cambodia
- Vessantara Jataka
- Cambodian Royal Chronicles
