= Pich Tum Krovil =

Pich Tum Krovil was a scholar of Khmer literature as well as one of the most famous performing artists in Cambodia from the late 1960s who helped revive performances after the fall of the Khmer Rouge regime.

== Biography ==
=== From the fields of Kandal to the University of Fine Arts ===
Pich Tum Kravil, originally known as Chhorn Tot, was born on 2 June 1943, in Sasey village, Koh Chen commune, Ponhea Leu district, in Kandal province, along the banks of the Mekong River, not far from the capital city of Phnom Penh. His father was Chuon Chhorn and his mother was Nhung Yom. Both were ordinary peasants.

Kravil went to study literature and music at the Royal University of Fine Arts from 1963 to 1967 and then became assistant professor at the same university.

=== From fame to infamy ===
In the 1960s, Pich Tum Kravil became famous for his interpretation of the role of Tum in "Tum Teav", a local equivalent to Romeo and Juliet.

During the Khmer Rouges regime, all intellectuals were persecuted. He was one of the rare artists to survive, even having to change his name during that time.

=== The revival of Khmer culture (1983-2015) ===
Surviving the Khmer Rouge regime, Tum Kravil helped revive the performing arts by organizing bands and performances with the support of the Ministry of Culture in the 1980s. He became an officia advisor to the "National Council for the Development of Cambodia" in 1983. [2]

From 2003 to 2008, he also served as chairman of the Board of the Royal University of Fine Arts and as an Advisor to the Government. And the Minister. In 2009, he became an advisor to the Ministry of Culture and Fine Arts.

Pich Tum Kravil died of heart disease on Friday, 15 May 2015, at 11:31 AM at the age of 72. The funeral of the elder was held at his home in Boeng Salang village, Sangkat Tuol Sangke, Khan Russey Keo, Phnom Penh.

== Publications ==
Tum Kravil authored 21 books on Cambodia's traditional art forms. His studies allowed for the revival of Cambodian theater, especially two different forms of shadow - puppet theater and on masked - dance theater

He also participated in the preparation of documents for the inclusion of the Khmer Grand Theater on the List of Intangible Cultural Heritage set up by the UNESCO.

== Awards ==
By 1999, Tum Kravil had won the first ever prize in Cambodia in the field of poetry composition for Southeast Asia. In 2001, he also received a bachelor's degree in French and a master's degree in literature from the Royal Academy of Cambodia. In 2002, he was awarded the title of National Hero for Cambodian Arts.

== See also ==
- Chheng Phon
