= Chheng Phon =

Cambodian Minister of Culture during the Kampuchea

His Excellency Chheng Phon
- ឆេង ផុន

Minister of Culture and Fine Arts
- In office 1982–1991
- Prime Minister: Heng Samrin

Personal details
- Born: 1930 Kampong Cham province, Cambodia
- Died: December 22, 2016 (aged 85–86) Ta Khmau, Kandal province, Cambodia
- Party: Cambodian People's Party
- Relations: Phoeurng Sackona is Chheng Phon's daughter-in-law Charya Cheam Burt is Chheng Phon's nephew
- Profession: Academic; politician
- Website: Government website

Chheng Phon, was born in 1930 in the Kompong Cham province and died on December 22, 2016, was a Cambodian artist who served as Minister of Information and Culture in the early 1990s, who is remembered as a "prominent dramatist and professor of Cambodia" as well as a "visionary of formidable knowledge, dedication, and energy" who has devoted a lifetime to preserving and nurturing Cambodian culture.

== Biography ==
=== Youth of a Khmer teacher of performing arts before the War ===
==== Youth and formation: from student to teacher ====
Chheng Phon was born in 1930 in the Kompong Cham province. In his twenties, he was a favorite of Queen Kossamak, and frequented the Royal Palace where he learnt the Royal Ballet of Cambodia. He studied to become a teacher in 1955, and received a scholarship to pursue his studies in China which he completed in 1960, returning to Cambodia, not without difficulty, as his relationship with Sihanouk become more tense. He then started working at the Royal University of Fine Arts in Phnom Penh where he founded the Khmer Folklore Troupe in 1964 to fight against what he considered "rampant pessimism" in the field of culture in Cambodia. He become a full-fledged professor at the university in 1968.

==== Traditional dancing during the Civil War ====
In 1970, he visited Japan to participate in the Osaka International Exposition, leading a Cambodian dance troupe. Later in the 1970s, as the country became engulfed by the war in Indochina, he started a performing arts "farm" outside of Phnom Penh to train students from the University of Fine Arts in traditional dance drama while they raised vegetables, chickens, and pigs. With his troupe, he created four stories of the Yike drama and five stories of the Bassac drama.

==== A leading figure for Khmer artists ====
In 1972, Chheng Phon became the President of the Khmer Artists' Association.

In 1973, he was named at the head of the National Conservatory of Spectacles of Cambodia, where he labored to save the art of Cambodian puppet theater by encouraging performers and collecting musical scores. He tried to develop an Artist Village intended to showcase the customs and traditions of Cambodia, through handicrafts, dance and music, but the idea fell short because of the war.

=== Surviving the Khmer Rouges ===
Chheng Phon was one of the small number of court dancers and dance teachers who survived the Pol Pot killings and "one of only three major cultural figures who survived the years of killings, hiding his identity and pretending to be a peasant." He spend these terrible years in Kompong Thom Province.

=== Reviving Khmer greatness with the Ministry of Culture ===
==== Bringing surviving dancers together ====
In January 1979, Heng Samrin proclaimed the restoration of normal society after four years of the Pol Pot regime had trashed most aspects of family life and the previous society. Actor, poet, and director Pich Tum Krovil and Chheng Phon were among the cultural stars who miraculously survived and now dedicated the rest of their lives to resuscitating their cherished traditions of dance.They were enlisted by the new Ministry of Information and Culture under Keo Chenda, charged with the critical mission of bringing all the surviving dancers together. In 1981, Chheng Phon was named director of the School of Fine Arts which he reopened in Phnom Penh, as a place where he could gather the artists scattered across the country and train a new generation of dancers. His perception of the dire state of culture in Cambodia after the fall of the Khmers Rouges was unambiguous:

The genocidal Pol Pot—Ieng Sary—Khieu Samphan regime destroyed our national culture almost completely.

— Chheng Phon

==== Serving the renaissance of Cambodia as Minister of Culture ====
In 1981, Chheng Pon was appointed Deputy Minister of the People's Republic of Kampuchea, thus becoming "the first person without any revolutionary or definite communist background to be appointed to a party leadership position". In 1982, Chheng Phon was appointed Minister of Culture of Kampuchea, staying in office until 1991, a position in which he had to reconcile his love for Khmer traditions and the political agenda of communist ideology, producing "revised" and politicized cultural works as artists were encouraged " to adapt the tradition to modern times". Chheng Phon as Minister would however restore what was left of Khmer traditions among his people, saying: "the influence of Buddhism is quite significant, and the traditions of monarchy are still felt." He worked as an expert consultant on the set of Nine Levels of Hell, a Czech-Cambodian romantic drama from 1987.

Professor Chheng Phon reopened the University of Fine Arts, Phnom Penh, the former Royal University of Fine Arts, in 1989 to promote the preservation of both tangible and intangible cultural assets of Cambodia.

In 1990, as Minister of Culture, he told the Khmer classical ballet to revive all 18 forms of the ballet.

=== Later life of the cultural conscience of Cambodia ===
==== From retirement to spiritual retreat ====
On August 5, 1990, Chheng Phon submitted his resignation as Minister for Culture for health reasons, though some journalists have noted that the real cause may have been his proximity with Ung Phan of the FUNCINPEC royalist party which had just been ousted. He retired from most of his political affairs in 1992 and used his own money to establish the Center for Culture and Vipassana at his home in the suburbs of Phnom Penh, in a place that was originally, in the late 1980s, a place for artists to study meditation in relation to performance.

He travelled to California in 1993 to meet former students who had sought asylum in the United States. Together, they recreated the Khmer Royal Ballet in an auditorium at California State University at Long Beach.

In 1993 he became a member of the National Council of Culture of Cambodia.

==== Heading the National Election Committee ====
After seven years far from political life, he returned to the public scene to hold a position as chairman of the National Election Committee of Cambodia in 1997, a choice that was criticized by those close to the FUNCINPEC who now considered him a supporter of Hun Sen too close to the Cambodian People's Party, which he had left briefly before the Paris Peace Agreements. On March 7, 1998, he signed a $25.8 million contract with a private company called Ciccone to stage the elections, and when criticized for his actions, he assumed his responsibility, saying there were no other options. Nevertheless, his neutrality was appreciated in the election process, even by international observers such as Human Rights Watch as well as the Asian Network for Free Elections, which acknowledged that Chheng Phon actively helped deploy a network of independent observers during the election cycle.

==== Death ====
Chheng Phon died on December 22, 2016, in Ta Khmau in Kandal province at the age of 86. Sending his condolences to the family, Prime Minister Hun Sen acknowledged him as a national hero saying:

The death of this elderly man is the loss of a father, a grandfather of Brahmavihara and the loss of human resources, [who] took an important role in serving and developing the nation.

— Prime Minister Hun Sen

== Views ==
=== The "warrior mentality" and spiritual battle of Khmer civilization ===
Chheng Phon defended his efforts to rebuild the classical dance tradition by appealing to a sense of pride in a Cambodian "national aesthetic." Chheng Phon often insisted, as he did during his intervention at Japan Foundation's "Symposium on Angkor," that the cultural restoration in Cambodia should also be a spiritual restoration. To that end, the renaissance of Khmer civilization did not only require a stronger economy but a new generation of politicians with a "warrior mentality", "visionary men and women who can reignite pride in the culture that the previous generation brought close to annihilation".

=== Conserving Angkor ===
As Minister of Culture, Chheng Phon struggled to preserve the authentic site of the Angkor monuments; for him, "build a five-star hotel near the monuments would be to destroy the monuments". He wanted horse-drawn carts as taxis and no airport close to the archeological site. He had an ambitious vision for the restoration of national monuments of Cambodia:

We still remember the high civilization of Angkor. What we had 1,000 years ago we must make alive again.

— Chheng Phon

=== Cultural communication between West and East ===
While he was very conservative on cultural issues, Chheng Phon was open to new creations, such as the 1999 version of Shakespeare's Othello which was blended into Khmer ballet by his niece Sophiline Shapiro whom he praised for her "communication between the west and the east".

== Legacy ==
He was a representative playwright of Cambodia and also a professor of the study of ancient Khmer art. He was also a screenwriter, director, an actor. He contributed to the restoration of traditional culture in villages that were destroyed during the Khmer Civil War.

He dedicated his life after the Civil War to the training of specialists who would devote themselves to the restoration of cultural property and was especially well known for assembling the artists and performers who survived the Khmer Rouge. As such, Chheng Phon is remembered as one of the "heroic saviours of the performing arts" in Cambodia".

He is survived by two sons, who are filmmakers. Culture Minister Phoeurng Sackona is Chheng Phon's daughter-in-law.

Chheng Phon was the mentor to a whole generation of Khmer artists, such as Pech Tum Kravil who considered Phon as his "mentor".

== Honors ==
- 1989: First Honor Medal for Edification and Preservation of Khmer Culture of the People's Republic of Kampuchea
- 1997: Fukuoka Prize

== Bibliography ==
- Primary Studies on Khmer Arts and Culture, Royal University of Fine Arts, Phnom Penh, 1966
- The Khmer Folk Arts: Khmer Music and Dance, Royal University of Fine Arts, Phnom Penh, 1967
- The Real Value of Khmer Arts and Culture (Dissertation Research), Royal University of Fine Arts, Phnom Penh, 1968
- The Khmer Shadow Play, Royal University of Fine Arts, Phnom Penh, 1973
- Formula for Leading and Governing Khmer Culture and Arts, Ministry of Information and Culture, Phnom Penh, 1981
- Perspectives on Khmer Culture in the Years 2000, Ministry of Information and Culture, 1985
- Pu-kun: A Real Khmer Fanner (A Work of Speaking Theater), Ministry of Information and Culture, Phnom Penh, 1990
- Khmer Lives, Arts, and Culture, Center for Culture and Vipassana, Ta Khmau, 1994
- Peacebuilding Through Culture and Cooperation, Center for Culture and Vipassana, Ta Khmau, 1994
- Master and Follower, Center for Culture and Vipassana, Ta Khmau, 1994
- Combating Corruption Through the Promotion of Khmer Morality, Virtue and Wisdom, Center for Culture and Vipassana, Ta Khmau, 1994
- 40 Questions, 40 Answers, Center for Culture and Vipassana, Ta Khmau, 1995
- Brahmavihara Dharma (The Four Sublime or Divine States of Mind), Center for Culture and Vipassana, Ta Khmau, 1995
- The Tenfold Conducts of Khmer-Human Leaders during Angkorean Period, Center for Culture and Vipassana, Ta Khmau, 1995
- The Seven Stages of Purification, Center for Culture and Vipassana, Ta Khmau, 1995
- Religion, Culture and Development, Center for Culture and Vipassana, Ta Khmau, 1996
