= Heritage Watch =

- Founded: 2003
- Founder: Dougald O'Reilly
- Purpose: Maintaining the national cultural identity of Cambodia
- Region served: Cambodia
- Website: Official Website

Heritage Watch is a non-profit organization dedicated to saving Cambodia’s cultural legacy. Heritage Watch has been working since 2003 to raise awareness of looting and its consequences and to research the trade of illicit Cambodian antiquities.

== History ==
Heritage Watch was established following the rampant looting of Phum Snay, an immense Iron Age burial ground in Cambodia's northwest. After its discovery in 1999, Phum Snay was destroyed by looters seeking its rich grave offerings—beautiful ceramics, iron weapons and gold and bronze jewelry. Rescue excavations were conducted at the site, but 90% of it was already lost. Realizing that an entire chapter of Cambodia's history was disappearing, a group of archaeologists made it their mission to promote the protection of the country's heritage. To better achieve this goal, Heritage Watch was founded.

Heritage Watch's Board of Directors includes international leaders in the field of Southeast Asian studies. The organization has frequently been featured in both the national and the international media, including The Times, The Associated Press, The BBC, and in a documentary on the U.S. Public Broadcasting Station. It has twice been the recipient of the U.S. Ambassador's Fund for Cultural Heritage, and has also received awards from UNESCO, Friends of Khmer Culture, Lonely Planet Publications, and number private organizations and donors.

In its first few years of operations, Heritage Watch has accomplished a great deal. With generous funding from the U.S. Department of State, it launched a national public awareness campaign targeting both those who loot and buy antiquities. Heritage Watch attacked the supply end of the trade through informative radio and television commercials, educational comic books, and community workshops for villagers in heavily looted areas and the establishment of a telephone hot-line. Tourists were informed about the negative consequences of buying looted art through public exhibits, airport kiosks, and public lectures.

== Projects ==
=== Nationwide Education Initiative 2004/2005 ===
Training teams were dispatched to areas that are worst affected by looting. Nine training sessions were conducted during the project resulting in over 600 villagers being educated on heritage issues. Ninety five percent of participants reported a clearer understanding of the value of heritage after the trainings. HeritageWatch produced a training manual and posters for the training and worked in conjunction with the Ministry of Culture and Fine Arts.

HeritageWatch released a television and radio in Khmer for national distribution exhorting people to safeguard their heritage. A looting hot-line was also established and has resulted in a number of reports of looting in remote areas.

Tourist awareness is also a component of this and kiosks have been created for the Phnom Penh and Siem Reap airports warning visitors not to purchase antiquities.

=== Excavation and Student Training 2005/2006 ===
Students at the Royal University of Fine Arts received in-class training by professional archaeologists for two full semesters. The students then received practical training during the excavation and survey of a looted site in Banteay Meanchey Province. The project also saw a provincial survey of Iron Age sites covering several hundred square kilometers. The project resulted in the excavation and documentation of an important settlement dating to the early centuries AD and an analysis of hundreds of looted human remains.

=== Social Development and Heritage Protection Project at Koh Ker ===
Heritage Watch supports the creation of sustainable, income-generating activities at threatened sites. One such site is the ancient Khmer capital of Koh Ker. Built in the 10th century, Koh Ker is home to dozens of magnificent temples and is now poised to become a major tourist destination. The people of Koh Ker are among the poorest in Cambodia and many are the victims of landmines. Heritage Watch will promote the protection of the temple complex while providing a sustainable development strategy that ensures the people of Koh Ker will directly benefit from its development.

The project will see the people trained in small business management, craft production, land rights, English language and tourism. They will also receive mobile retailing carts and ox carts, retro-fitted to carry tourists. Training in heritage protection and conservation will also be provided and assistance given to organize community patrols to protect the temples from looting and report thefts.

=== Heritage Architecture Preservation Project ===
Phnom Penh is home to many unique architectural structures that are increasingly under threat as the city develops. HeritageWatch has established a campaign whereby important structures are recognised with an explanatory, commemorative plaque listing the date of construction, and historical importance. The buildings will be included in a ‘Heritage Cyclo Tour’ whereby visitors and residents to Phnom Penh may tour historic sites and listen to prerecorded audio tapes describing the cities heritage. It is hoped that the value of these buildings will be recognised through this programme and encourage their preservation.

=== Petition ===
An on-line petition has been started at www.heritagewatch.org/petition.php to convince the governments of Thailand and Singapore to sign the 1970 UNESCO Convention on the Means of Prohibiting and Preventing the Illicit Import, Export and Transfer of Ownership of Cultural Property. Most of the antiquities stolen from Cambodia are transited through neighbouring countries and adoption of the 1970 UNESCO convention by Thailand and Singapore would go a long way in decreasing the destruction of Southeast Asia's heritage.

=== Heritage Friendly Tourism Campaign ===
As Cambodia becomes a more popular tourist destination the country's heritage will be impacted. HeritageWatch, in conjunction with the Ministry of Tourism, is promoting 'Heritage Friendly' Tourism in Cambodia. Travel agencies and hotels will promote and disseminate heritage friendly guidelines to visitors. Visitors receive the added value of a newsletter and calendar. The guidelines promote heritage awareness and include suggested behaviours such as refraining from touching the bas reliefs, being respectful of these sacred spaces, conservation of water, etc. Participating businesses receive a "Heritage Friendly Operator" designation.

== Publications ==
Heritage Watch has produced a number of different publications in its effort to protect Cambodia's patrimony including a comic book Wrath of the Phantom Army, a children's book called If the Stones Could Speak and it produces as bi-monthly tourism magazine called TouchStone which is distributed free in Cambodia.

== Awards ==
Heritage Watch has been awarded the Pacific Asia Travel Association's Gold Award and the Tourism Cares Award in 2007. The organization was shortlisted for the World Tourism and Travel Association's Destination Award in 2008 and the organization received the prestigious Heritage Conservation Award.

The awarded a Site Preservation Grant to Heritage Watch in 2009/10. Heritage Watch will be working with Global Heritage Fund, which began a major development and conservation program at the archaeological site of Banteay Chhmar in 2008.
