= Tum Teav =

Cambodian romantic tragedy folk tale

Tum Teav (Khmer: ទុំទាវ [tum tiəw]; meaning "Tum and Teav") is a mid-19th century Cambodian romantic tragedy folk tale. It is originally based on a poem and is considered the "Cambodian Romeo and Juliet" and has been a compulsory part of the Cambodian secondary national curriculum since the 1950s.

Although its first translation in French had been made by Étienne Aymonier already in 1880, Tum Teav was popularized abroad when writer George Chigas translated the 1915 literary version by the venerable Buddhist monk Preah Botumthera Som, one of the best writers in the Khmer language.

== Plot ==
The tale relates the encounters of a musically talented, novice Buddhist monk named Tum and an aristocratic girl named Teav. During his travels from Ba Phnum, Prey Veng, to the district of Tboung Khmum, where he has gone to sell bamboo rice containers for his pagoda, Tum falls in love with Teav, a very beautiful young lady who is drawn to his beautiful singing voice. She reciprocates his feelings and offers Tum some betel and a blanket as evidence of her affections. Upon returning to his home province, Tum is consumed with longing for Teav and soon returns to Tboung Khmum. Soon afterward, he is recruited by King Reamea to sing at the royal palace, and he leaves Teav once again.

Teav's mother is unaware of her daughter's love for the young monk, and in the meantime she has agreed to marry her daughter off to the son of Archun, the powerful governor of the province. Her plans are interrupted, however, when emissaries of Reamea—equally impressed by Teav's beauty—insist that she marry the Cambodian king instead. Archun agrees to cancel his son's wedding arrangement, and Teav is brought to the palace. When Tum sees that Teav is to marry the king, he boldly sings a song that professes his love for her. Reamea overcomes his initial anger and agrees to allow the young couple to marry.

Enraged, Archun commands his guards to kill Tum, who is beaten to death under a Bodhi tree. Grief-stricken, Teav slits her own throat and collapses on Tum's body. When Reamea hears of the murder, he descends upon Archun's palace, ignores the governor's pleas for mercy, and orders Archun's entire family—including seven generations worth of relatives—be taken to a field and buried to their necks. An iron plow and harrow are then used to decapitate them all.

== Analysis ==
Pich Tum Krovil became famous in the 1960s for his interpretation of the role of Tum. He would after help for the revival of the play after the fall of the Khmer Rouge.

Critical scholarship using Tum Teav is diverse. The work was the exemplary text in a 1998 article, "A Head for an Eye: Revenge in the Cambodian Genocide," by Alexander Laban Hinton that tries to understand anthropological motivations for the scale of violence perpetrated by the Khmer Rouge. That article reads in Tum Teav a cultural model of karsângsoek, or "disproportionate revenge." Archoun's murder of Tum, a blow to the authority of the King, is returned by the genocide of Archoun's line: "a head for an eye."

In 2000, Cambodian record label Rasmey Hang Meas adapted the story into a full-length karaoke musical on DVD.

In 2003, the story was again adapted into a two-hour film directed by Fay Sam Ang.

In 2021, an updated version of the Tum Teav was uploaded to YouTube by a group of young actors, causing a national scandal, for its explicit character. Though the plot was unchanged, the interpretation was considered insulting for Buddhist monks and traditional morality and the producers avoided a public trial but offering a public apology.

== See also ==
- Literature of Cambodia
- Tum Teav (2003 film)
