= Preah Botumthera Som =

Cambodian writer

- Born: Botumthera Som; 1852; Prey Veng, Cambodia
- Died: 1932 (aged 80)
- Occupation: Writer
- Writing career
- Language: Khmer
- Years active: 1911–1932
- Notable work: Tum Teav

Preah Botumthera Som (Khmer: ព្រះបទុមត្ថេរសោម, 1852–1932) was a Cambodian writer. He is also known as Venerable Botumthera Som, Brah Padumatthera in French manuscripts, or often simply as Som (សោម). He is considered one of the best writers in the Khmer language.

== Biography ==
Botumthera Som was born in a rural area of Cambodia, in the village of Kamprau, Prey Veng Province, as the sixth of seven boys.

In 1867, Botumthera Som was ordained as a novice monk at the Wat Kamprau temple. During his monastic life he learned to read and write, but he disrobed in order to help at the family farm after only two years as a novice monk.

In 1873, Botumthera Som became a monk again at Wat Kamprau and continued his studies. During that time he made great progress, learning how to compose poetry on his own and writing it using the traditional method, on palmyra palm leaves. As years went by, he was named the abbot of the temple.

In 1911 Som wrote the novel Dik ram phka ram (The Dancing Water and the Dancing Flower).

In September 1915, at the age of sixty-three, Botumthera Som completed his best-known work, the palm leaf manuscript of Tum Teav. His version of Tum Teav contains 1050 stanzas, including a 39-stanza preface in which Venerable Som gives the manuscript's date of composition and identifies himself as the author.

Tum Teav is a classic tragic love story of the Cambodian literature set in Kampong Cham, Botumthera Som's village, Kamprau, is on the border of the former district of Tbong Khmom where Tum Teav takes place.

Botumthera Som died in 1932 when he was 80 years old.

== Tum Teav ==
In 1935, three years after his death, another monk, Venerable Oum, copied Botumthera Som's Tum Teav manuscript on a new set of palm leaves. Oum's copy has two volumes and 187 pages.

Tum Teav is a story that has been told throughout Cambodia since at least the mid 19th century. It is based on a 17th or 18th century poem of uncertain source, probably having its origins in a more ancient Cambodian folk legend. Nowadays Tum Teav has oral, literary, theatre, and film versions in the Khmer language.

== See also ==
- Literature of Cambodia
