= George Chigas =

American writer and scholar

- Education: Tufts University (B.A., 1980); Cornell University (M.A., 1997); University of London (Ph.D., 2002)
- Occupations: Author; Professor
- Known for: Expert and political commentator on Cambodian culture and crimes of the Khmer Rouge

George Chigas is an American writer, scholar and expert on Cambodian culture and literature. He is currently an emeritus associate teaching professor in the World Languages and Cultures department at the University of Massachusetts Lowell.

== Early life and education ==
Chigas graduated with a B.A. in Classical Studies from Tufts University in 1980. Subsequently he obtained an M.A. in Asian Studies from Cornell University in 1997 and a PhD in Southeast Asian Languages and Cultures from the University of London SOAS in 2002.

== Career ==
Following his B.A., in the late 1980s, Chigas worked at Lowell's International Institute and subsequently with a refugee processing center in the Philippines and in different refugee camps along the Thai/Cambodian border.

Chigas was the Associate Director of the Cambodian Genocide Program at Yale University from 1998-2001. Working on the program he was involved in collecting evidence against Khmer Rouge leaders, who were later put on trial in Cambodia. In 2009 Chigas worked on a project with the Cambodian Ministry of Education, Youth and Sports to publish the first nationally used textbook on the Khmer Rouge.

In 2010 he was named lecturer in the Cultural Studies Department at UMass Lowell, where he had served as visiting professor before.

== Political commentator ==
Chigas is regarded an expert and noted political commentator on Cambodian culture and on the crimes of the Khmer Rouge that took place in Cambodia during the 1970s. He has spoken out on the regime's crimes in their time and today still is requested for statements in public news outlets on different issues regarding Cambodia, its people, culture and related issues.

== Works ==
=== Literature ===
He completed an English translation of the Cambodian verse novel The Story of Tum Teav, and is co-author with Susan Cook of "Putting the Khmer Rouge on Trial", which appeared in the Bangkok Post on October 31, 1999.

Other works include:

==== Books ====
- Cambodia's Lament: A Selection of Cambodian Writing

==== Articles ====
- The politics of defining justice after the Cambodian genocide, Taylor & Francis, Journal of Genocide Research
- Cambodia's lost literary life, Mekong Review (2016)
- Bearing witness to Cambodia's horror, 20 years after Pol Pot's death (2018)

=== Photography ===
Chigas created The George Chigas Collection, a small collection of photographs featuring Cambodian sites and ceremonies in the city of Lowell, Massachusetts, and has also displayed photos of Cambodia.

== Personal life ==
George Chigas was previously married to Thida Loeung with whom he has two children. He's an American who speaks Khmer.
