= Ou Reang Ov District =

Ou Reang Ov ស្រុកអូរាំងឪ
- District (srok)
- Location in Cambodia
- Coordinates: 11°46′13″N 105°29′12″E
- Country: Cambodia
- Province: Tboung Khmum
- Communes: 7
- Villages: 141

Population (1998)
  - Total: 82,806
- Time zone: +7
- Geocode: 2511

Ou Reang Ov District (Khmer: ស្រុកអូរាំងឪ, lit. 'The Canal of Barringtonia acutangula Tree') is a district (srok) located in Tboung Khmum Province, Cambodia. The district capital is Ou Reang Ov town located around 30 kilometres south of the provincial capital of Kampong Cham by road. Ou Reang Ov lies on the border where Tboung Khmum, Kampong Cham and Prey Veng provinces meet; the town of Prey Veng is only 42 kilometres away by road.

Prior to 31 December 2013 when Tboung Khmum Province was formed by royal decree, the district was part of Kampong Cham Province. Ou Reang Ov is easily accessed by road from Kampong Cham or Prey Veng town. Ou Reang Ov is a long narrow district located in southern Tboung Khmum. A large rubber plantation covers the northern part of the district. Ou Reang Ov town lies on National Highway 11 which runs from Neak Leung in Prey Veng province to an intersection with National Highway 7 at Thnal Totoung in Tboung Kmom District.

== Location ==
Ou Reang Ov district lies in the southwestern region of Tboung Khmum Province, sharing a border with Prey Veng Province to the south and Kampong Cham to the west. Reading from the north clockwise, Ou Reang Ov borders with Tboung Khmum District to the north and Ponhea Kraek District to the east, while Kanhchriech and Sithor Kandal districts of Prey Veng Province are to the south. Sithor Kandal district continues from the south to wrap around the lower western border of the district and Koh Sotin district of Kampong Cham makes up the remainder of the western border.

== Operation Pacific Angel ==
In 2008, Ou Reang Ov district was home to a humanitarian mission from Operation Pacific Angel. Operation Pacific Angel is a recurring joint/combined humanitarian assistance mission sponsored by United States Pacific Command (USPACOM) designed to bring humanitarian civic assistance and civil-military operations to areas in need in the Pacific region. In May 2008, the first Pacific Angel mission took place. Members of the US Air Force, US Army, and US Marine Corps conducted the twofold mission to Cambodia and Thailand. At the Ou Reang Ov district hospital, medical and dental programs were set up to see patients along with doctors from the Royal Cambodian Armed Forces and the Children’s Surgical Centre. Medical staff provided cost-free general medical care, women's health care, and ophthalmology/optometry care to a total of more than 6,000 people in Kampong Chhnang and what was then part of Kampong Cham.

== Administration ==
The Ou Reang Ov district governor reports to the Governor of Tboung Khmum. The following table shows the villages of Ou Reang Ov district by commune.

| Khum (Commune) | Phum (Villages) |
|---|---|
| Ampil Ta Pok | Trapeang Bangkang, Prey Sralau, Lekh Pram, Lekh Buon Lech, Tuol Kbal Tonsaong, Svay Ta Thoam, Pou Meas, Mitt Ta Rach, Tuol Ta Lorb, Damnak Beng, Pou Svay Ming, Svay Ming, Meas Snae, Svay Roluos, Chrey Ta Sour, Lekh Bei, Lekh Buon Kaeut, Changva, Bos Lhong, Ampil Cheung, Ampil Tboung, Trapeang Ruessei, Svay Ta Lak, Ampil Chrum |
| Chak | Chruol, Chamlak, Trapeang Kandaol, Chamkar Kor, Ou Laok, Chrouy Ph'ong, Chak, Pring, Trach Chrum, Daeum Changkran, Prasat, Khtom Leav, Putthea, Trapeang Tea, Kouk Ti, Chumpu, Sralong |
| Damril | Damrel Ti Muoy, Damrel Ti Pir, Damrel Ti Bei, Damrel Ti Buon, Yeak Cheung, Yeak Tboung, Sangkae, Samraong, Peuk, Chrey Sokhom, Kbal Ou, Krapeu, Sam Snae, Srae Sruoch, Tuol, Thlok, Chanlaong, Khnab Damrei Cheung, Khnab Damrei Tboung, Pralay |
| Kong Chey | Stueng Reang, Sokram Chrum, Tumneab, Lekh Pir, Kong Chey, Ou Damray, Thnal Kaong, Bangkean Sar, Tuol Sralau, Stueng Chey, Tuol Trach, Prum Khet, Andoung, Phum Lekh Muoy, Tuol Ta Hao, Tuol Sama, Changva, Soeng, Cheung Voat, Ou Popul, Thmei, Srae Spey |
| Mien | Banteay Mien, Saoy, Svay Pok, Mien, Prey Sambuor Kaeut, Prey Sambuor Lech, Boeng Cheung, Thmei, Kanlaeng Chak, Boeng Kandal, Me Loung, Kampul Serei, Thma Samlieng, Thma Krachum |
| Preah Theat | Ba Srei, Kbal Tuk, Phnum, Tuol Thkov, Tuol Mean Chey, Tuol Pnov, Tuol Khleang, Preah Theat Kandal, Tuol Sambour, Preah Theat Thma Da, Trapeang Neang, Boeng Kang, Chey Saophoan, Thmei Kandal, Neak Ta tvear, Thnal Kaeng, Thmei Leu, Srae Mien, Phum Dabpir, Phum Mpheypram, Phum Mphey Prampir, Phum Saesebbuon |
| Tuol Sophi | Kbal Thnal, Kbal Peae, Thmei, Boeng Phtil, Ta Ngin, Tuol Sopoar, Trapeang Ph'av, Poung, Chan Andaet, Trapeang Lvea Tboung, Trapeang Lvea Cheung, Boeng Kampues, Stueng, Thma Da Lech, Tuol Sophi, Damnak Kaev, Doun Tes, Thma Da Kaeut, Kbal Ou, Phum Chetseb Prammuoy, Phum Hasebbuon, Phum Chetsebbei |

== Demographics ==
The district is subdivided into 7 communes (khum) and 141 villages (phum). According to the 1998 Census, the population of the district was 82,806 persons in 16,940 households in 1998. With a population of over 80,000 people, Ou Reang Ov district has one of the smaller district populations in Tboung Khmum province. The average household size in Ou Reang Ov is 4.9 persons per household, which is slightly lower than the rural average for Cambodia (5.2 persons). The sex ratio in the district is 90.5%, with significantly more females than males.
