= Operation Pacific Angel =

Operation Pacific Angel is a recurring joint/combined humanitarian assistance mission sponsored by US Pacific Command (USPACOM) designed to bring humanitarian civic assistance (HCA) and civil-military operations (CMO) to areas in need in the Pacific region. It is conducted in locations throughout the Pacific theater to support the U.S. military charter of capacity building in partner nations. The operations contain elements of all four branches of the Department of Defense, including active duty, National Guard, and reserve members.

The official statement from the USPACOM Public Affairs team states that U.S. military participates in these operations to enhance relations with partner nations, build medical and civil assistance capacity in those nations, and to prove a commitment to support the nation's efforts to assist their population in a time of need.

The key difference between this mission and previous missions is that these missions are focused on capacity building in the host nation. The mission objective is to provide assistance to an area, and leave behind a capability for the host nation doctors to continue to provide the services.

Envisioned, planned and implemented by Col. John Cinco, Division Chief US Pacific Air Forces International Health Affairs, a Pacific Angel CONOPS mission to Oceana was conducted in July 2007. PACOM then agreed to fund the initiative and the first official mission dubbed PACANGEL 08-1 was conducted in Cambodia in May 2008.

== Operations ==
Oceana Mission July 2007 In July 2007, the US Pacific Air Forces (PACAF) Command conducted a 10-day mission to the Oceana island nations of Kiribati, Nauru, and Vanuatu. This mission was unofficially dubbed Pacific Angel. Due to success in the mission, USPACOM directed PACAF to conduct a mission of continuing assistance to regional partner nations on a recurring basis. The focus of these missions would be on capacity building for the nation, subject matter expert exchanges, and engineering construction and repair of facilities. (More information concerning the Oceana mission of July 2007 will be uploaded shortly.)

Pacific Angel 2008-01 (Thailand/Cambodia)

Pacific Angel 2008-01 was designed to be a concurrent operation with the Royal Thai Air Force and the Royal Cambodian Armed Forces. In Thailand, an aeromedical evacuation subject matter expert exchange (SMEE) was planned with aeromedical evacuation personnel at U’tapao military airfield in Thailand. In Cambodia, the bulk of the HCA mission was to take place. Sites were placed outside of Kampong Chhnang and Kampong Cham, approximately 130 km north of the capital city of Phnom Penh

In May 2008, the first actual Pacific Angel mission took place. Members of the US Air Force, US Army, and US Marine Corps conducted the twofold mission to Cambodia and Thailand. On May 22 around 7 PM, an Alaska Air National Guard C-130 carrying approximately 6000 pounds of medical supplies arrived at Phnom Penh airport in Cambodia. On May 25, the C-130 returned to Cambodia, this time landing at Kampong Chhnang military airfield, marking the first time a U.S. military aircraft had landed there. They unloaded another approximately 3000 pounds of supplies bound for sites in the Kampong Chhnang region and the Kampong Cham region.

US military doctors, nurses, technicians, engineers, and veterinarians assisted members of the Royal Cambodian Armed Forces and members of the Children's Surgical Centre during the operation. On Sunday May 24, Medical operations at the three sites began

In Kampong Cham, the mission operated out of the regional referral hospital in Kampong Cham city conducting civic action programs, such as an engineering CAP and a VETCAP. Engineering personnel began repair and refurbishment operations to the hospital on 26 May. US Military veterinarians conducted a SMEE with two local Cambodian veterinarians, and three veterinary students. By 25 May, they had serviced 258 animals, mostly livestock.

At the Ou Reang Ov district hospital, approximately 20 km south of Kampong Cham, medical and dental programs were set up to see patients along with doctors from the Royal Cambodian Armed Forces and the Children's Surgical Centre. On the first day of operations, 634 patients had been seen, including: 354 primary care patients, 180 optometry patients with 13 surgeries, and 100 dental patients with 376 dental procedures completed. Also during this event, local medical students participated for training.

The site in Kampong Chhnang, the Friendship clinic, was built by US personnel on a previous mission. It was designed as a multi-purpose room for the community, and was built by the US Marine Corps. Operations out of the Friendship clinic included medical and dental services with doctors from the Children's Surgical Centre and the Royal Cambodian Armed Forces. During the first day of operation, 507 patients were seen at the clinic including: 354 primary care patients, 32 Women's health patients, 59 optometry patients with 7 surgeries, 67 dental patients with 81 dental procedures. During this even, a patient was referred to the Children's surgical centre in Phnom Penh for a subdural head injury that could not be treated at the clinic.

In Phnom Penh, US Air Force medical equipment technicians repaired equipment at the Children's Surgical Centre, the Chinda Clinic, and the Navy and Marine Research Unit (NAMRU). One USAF surgeon was assigned to the Children's Surgical Centre to assist in surgeries at the CSC main site and the Chinda Clinic. On the first day of operation the surgeon, Dr Kelleher, assisted in three surgeries. She stated that this experience has been incredible in that she has seen medical problems she would not have come across in the US. She stated that the US military doctors have much to learn from the medical personnel in Cambodia that do not have access to the technology, or facilities that are present in the United States.

At all locations SMEE operations were performed dealing with public health, preventative medicine, sanitation, and infection control.
