= Koh Sotin district =

Koh Sotin ស្រុកកោះសូទិន
- District (srok)
- Location in Cambodia
- Coordinates: 11°53′16″N 105°24′48″E
- Country: Cambodia
- Province: Kampong Cham
- Communes: 8
- Villages: 85

Population (1998)
  - Total: 70,672
- Time zone: +7
- Geocode: 0308

Koh Sotin (Khmer: ស្រុកកោះសូទិន, lit. 'The Courageous Date') is a district (srok) located in Kampong Cham province, Cambodia. The district capital is Chi Haer town located around 10 kilometres south of the provincial capital of Kampong Cham by water, but some 42 kilometres by road. The district borders on the southern bank of the Mekong River and includes the islands of Koh Sothin and Koh Mitt in its area.

The district is easily accessed by boat from Kampong Cham. Road access however, is via 12 kilometres of secondary road to National road 11 and then a further 18 kilometres to the intersection with National Highway 7. From this intersection in Tbong Khmom district is it a further 12 kilometres west to the provincial capital. This small relatively narrow district follows the south bank of the Mekong for about 25 kilometres. As the district is low lying, much of the land area of the district is inundated when the Mekong rises during the wet season.

== Location ==
Koh Sotin district is in southern Kampong Cham Province. The Mekong runs along the northern border of the district and the district boundary includes the river itself to midstream. Reading from the north clockwise, Koh Sotin shares a border with Kang Meas and Kampong Siem districts to the north and the district of Kampong Cham to the north east. Tbong Khmom and Ou Reang Ou districts are to the east. To the south is Sithor Kandal district of Prey Veng province and Srei Santhor district lies on the western boundary.

== Administration ==
The Koh Sotin district governor reports to Hun Neng, the Governor of Kampong Cham. The following table shows the villages of Koh Sotin district by commune.

ឃុំ (commune)	ភូមិ (villages)
Kampong Reab	Kaoh Chen Kraom(កោះចិនក្រោម), Kaoh Chen Leu(កោះចិនលើ), Kampong Reab Leu(កំពង់រាបលើ), Kampong Reab Kraom(កំពង់រាបក្រោម), Kampong Sdei Leu(កំពង់ស្ដីលើ), Kampong Sdei Kraom(កំពង់ស្ដីក្រោម), Kampong Sdei Kandal(កំពង់ស្ដីកណ្ដាល), Kampong Sdei Knong(កំពង់ស្ដីក្នុង)
Kaoh Soutin	Phum Muoy(ភូមិទី ១), Phum Pir(ភូមិទី ២), Phum Bei(ភូមិទី ៣), Phum Buon(ភូមិទី ៤), Phum Pram(ភូមិទី ៥), Phum Prammuoy(ភូមិទី ៦), Phum Prampir(ភូមិទី ៧), Phum Prambei(ភូមិទី ៨), Phum Prambuon(ភូមិទី ៩), Phum Dab(ភូមិទី ១០), Phum Dabmuoy(ភូមិទី ១១), Phum Dabpir(ភូមិទី ១២), Phum Dabbei(ភូមិទី ១៣), Phum Dabbuon(ភូមិទី ១៤)
Lve (ល្វេ)	Damnak Svay(ដំណាក់ស្វាយ), Roka Kaong(រកាកោង), Preaek Kol(ព្រែកគល់), Bat Srei Totueng(បទស្រីទន្ទឹង), Ambaeng Ches(អំបែងចេះ), Lve Leu(ល្វេលើ), Lve Kraom (ល្វេក្រោម), Tumpung(ទំពូង), Preaek Ta Kae(ព្រែកតាកែ), Preaek Changkran(ព្រែកចង្ក្រាន)
Moha Leaph	Chong Preaek(ចុងព្រែក), Moha Leaph Cheung(មហាលាភជើង), Moha Leaph Tboung(មហាលាភត្បូង), Roka Kaong Tboung(រកាកោងត្បូង), Roka Kaong Cheung(រកាកោងជើង), Damnak Pring Kaeut(ដំណាក់ព្រីងកើត), Damnak Pring Lech(ដំណាក់ព្រីងលិច), Roat Muni(រត្នមុនី), Chrouy Saset(ជ្រោយសសិត), Preaek(ព្រែក)
Moha Khnhoung	Khpob(ខ្ពប), Mohasiek Leu(មហាសៀកលើ), Mohasiek Kraom(មហាសៀកក្រោម), Kampong Chamlang(កំពង់ចម្លង), Khnhoung Leu(ខ្ញូងលើ), Kandal Khnhoung(កណ្ដាលខ្ញូង), Chong Khnhoung(ចុងខ្ញូង), Angkor Chey Leu(អង្គរជ័យលើ), Angkor Chey Kraom(អង្គរជ័យក្រោម)
Peam Prathnuoh	Phsar Thmei(ផ្សារថ្មី), Peam(ពាម), Thmei(ថ្មី), Krapeu Korm(ក្រពើគម), Pak Nam(ប៉ាក់ណាម), Chi Haer(ជីហែ), Samraong(សំរោង), Moha Leaph(មហាលាភ), Pongro(ពង្រ), Tuol Kdol(ទួលក្ដុល), Veal(វាល), Tuol Kampot(ទួលកំពត), Tuol Theat(ទួលធាតុ)
Pongro	Kampong Ov Chrueng(កំពង់ឪជ្រឹង), Preaek Rumdeng Kaeut(ព្រែករំដេងកើត), Preaek Rumdeng Lech(ព្រែករំដេងលិច), Pongro Kaeut(ពង្រកើត), Pongro Lech(ពង្រលិច), Daeum Sdau(ដើមស្ដៅ), Pak Nam(ប៉ាក់ណាម), Anlong Doung(អន្លង់ដូង)
Preaek Ta Nong	Phum Muoy(ភូមិទី ១), Phum Pir(ភូមិទី ២), Phum Bei(ភូមិទី ៣), Phum Buon(ភូមិទី ៤), Phum Pram(ភូមិទី ៥), Phum Prammuoy(ភូមិទី ៦), Phum Prampir(ភូមិទី ៧), Phum Prambei(ភូមិទី ៨), Phum Prambuon(ភូមិទី ៩), Phum Dab(ភូមិទី ១០), Phum Dabmuoy(ភូមិទី ១១), Phum Dabpir(ភូមិទី ១២), Phum Dabbei(ភូមិទី ១៣)

== Demographics ==
The district is subdivided into 8 communes (khum) and 85 villages (phum). According to the 1998 Census, the population of the district was 70,672 persons in 14,187 households in 1998. With a population of over 70,000 people, Koh Sotin has one of the smallest populations for districts in Kampong Cham province after Dambae and Kampong Cham districts. The average household size in Koh Sotin is 5.0 persons per household, which is slightly smaller than the rural average for Cambodia (5.2 persons). The sex ratio in the district is 89.6%, with significantly more females than males.

== Tourism ==
Wat Moha Leap, the only wooden-frame pagoda still standing in Cambodia, is a popular touristic destination located in Koh Sotin District.
