= Kampong Cham Municipality =

Kampong Cham municipality ស្រុកកំពង់ចាម Krong Kampong Cham
- Municipality
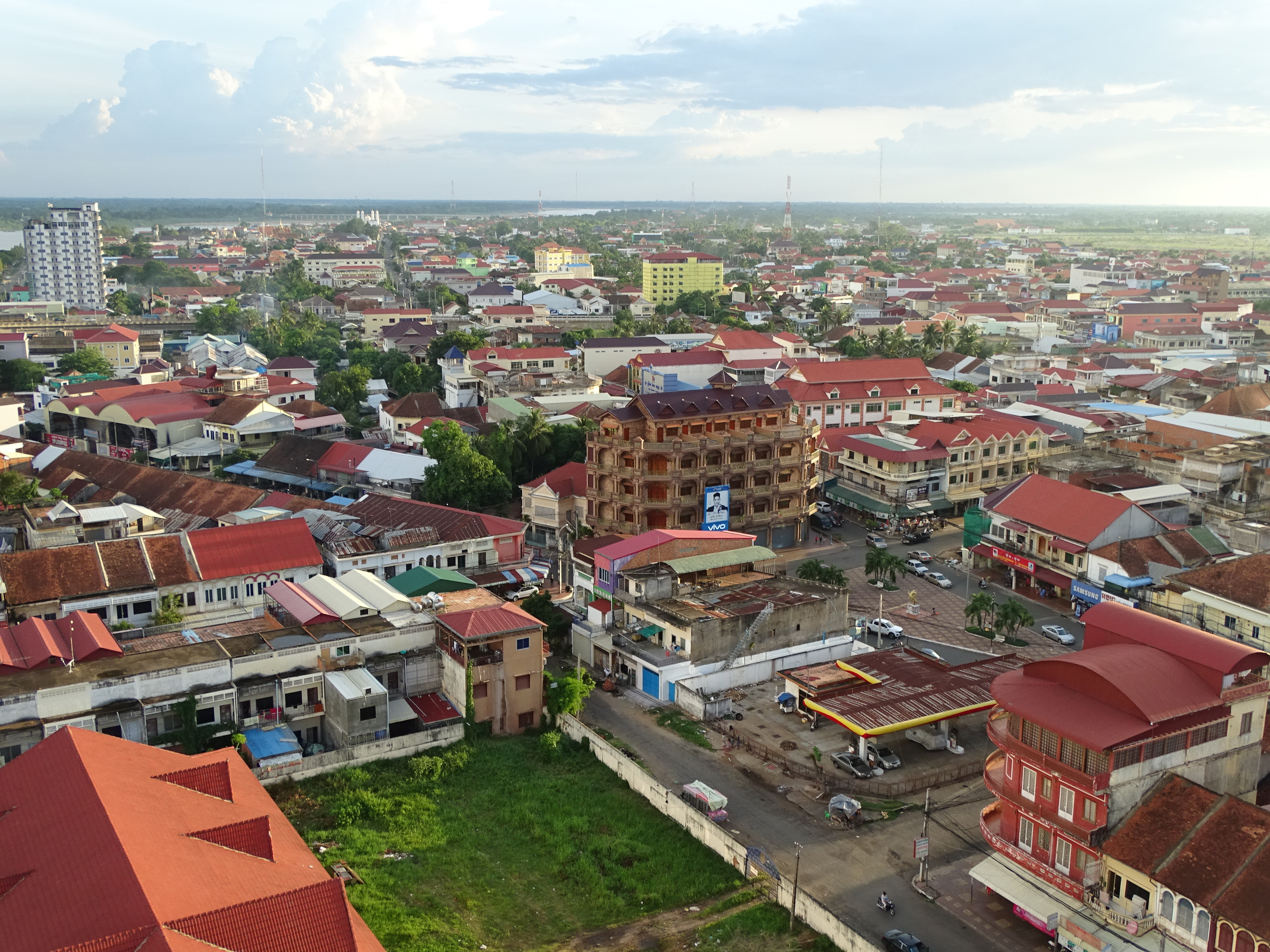
- View of Kampong Cham City

- Location in Cambodia
- Coordinates: 11°59′32″N 105°27′52″E
- Country: Cambodia
- Province: Kampong Cham
- Communes: 4
- Villages: 24

Population (1998)
  - Total: 45,354
- Time zone: +7
- Geocode: 0305

Kampong Cham municipality (Khmer: ស្រុកកំពង់ចាម) is a municipality (krong) of Kampong Cham province, Cambodia. Kampong Cham is considered an urban district. The provincial capital Kampong Cham City is located in this district. The city is located on National Highway 7 124 kilometres by road from the capital Phnom Penh. The district is split by the Mekong and the capital is located on the western bank of the river., since 2001, the Kizuna bridge provides a good junction for the region.

== Location ==
Kampong Cham district is the smallest district in Kampong Cham Province and is surrounded by other Kampong Cham districts. Reading from the north clockwise, Kampong Cham shares a border with Kampong Siem District while Tbong Khmom District forms the eastern boundary. To the south of Kampong Cham is Koh Soutin District. Kampong Siem lies on the western border.

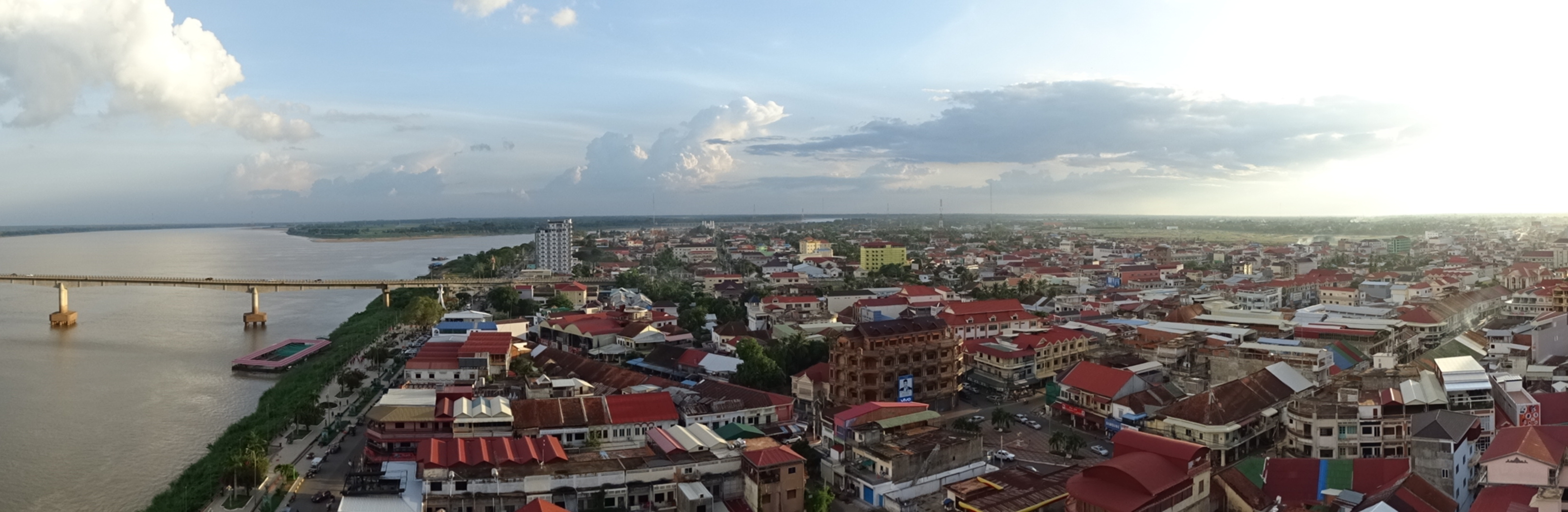
Panoramic view of Kampong Cham City

== Administration ==
The Kampong Cham district governor reports to Hun Neng, the Governor of Kampong Cham. The following table shows the villages of Kampong Cham district by commune.

ឃុំ (Communes)	ភូមិ (Villages)
Boeng Kok	Boeng Kok Muoy(បឹងកុកទី ១), Boeng Kok Pir(បឹងកុកទី ២), Chong Thnal Muoy(ចុងថ្នល់ ទី១), Chong Thnal Pir(ចុងថ្នល់ ទី២), La Edth(ឡឥដ្ឋ), Chrouy Thma(ជ្រោយថ្ម), Memay(មេម៉ាយ)
Kampong Cham	Phum Prampir(ភូមិទី ៧), Phum Prambei(ភូមិទី ៨), Phum Prambuon(ភូមិទី ៩), Phum Dab(ភូមិទី ១០), Phum Dabmuoy(ភូមិទី ១១), Phum Dabpir(ភូមិទី ១២), Phum Dabbei(ភូមិទី ១៣), Phum Dabbuon(ភូមិទី ១៤), Phum Dabpram(ភូមិទី ១៥)
Sambuor Meas	Roka Leu(រកាលើ), Roka Kraom(រកាក្រោម), Neang Konghing(នាងគង្ហីង), Boeng Basak(បឹងបាសាក់), Chamkar Khpob(ចំការខ្ពប), Boeng Snay(បឹងស្នាយ), Preaek Daeum Chan(ព្រែកដើមចាន់), Preaek Chik(ព្រែកជីក), Kampong Roling(កំពង់រលីង), Ta Neng(តាណេង)
Veal Vong	Phum Ti Muoy(ភូមិ ទី ១), Phum Ti Pir(ភូមិ ទី ២), Phum Ti Bei(ភូមិ ទី ៣), Phum Ti Buon(ភូមិ ទី ៤), Phum Ti Pram(ភូមិ ទី ៥), Phum Ti Prammuoy(ភូមិ ទី ៦)

== Demographics ==
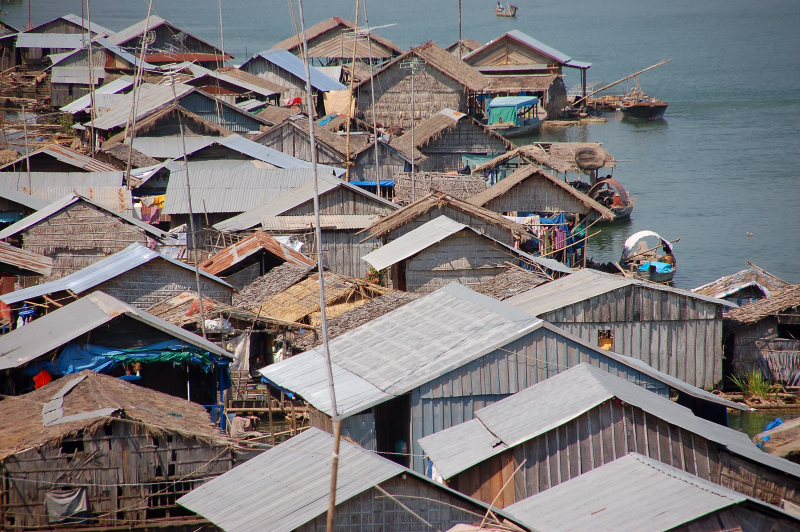
Kampong Cham

The district is subdivided into 4 communes (khum) and 24 villages (phum). According to the 1998 Census, the population of the district was 45,354 persons in 8,236 households in 1998. With a population of over 45,000 people, Kampong Cham is the least populated district in Kampong Cham province and is the smallest in area. The average household size in Kampong Cham is 5.4 persons per household, slightly lower than the average for urban areas of Cambodia (5.5). However, this is the largest household size of any district in Kampong Cham province and reflects the district's status as an urban centre. The sex ratio in the district is 94.9%, with more females than males.
