= Wat Moha Leap =

Wooden Buddhist monastery in Cambodia

Coordinates: 11.8703°N 105.4240°E

Wat Moha Leap វត្តមហាលាភ
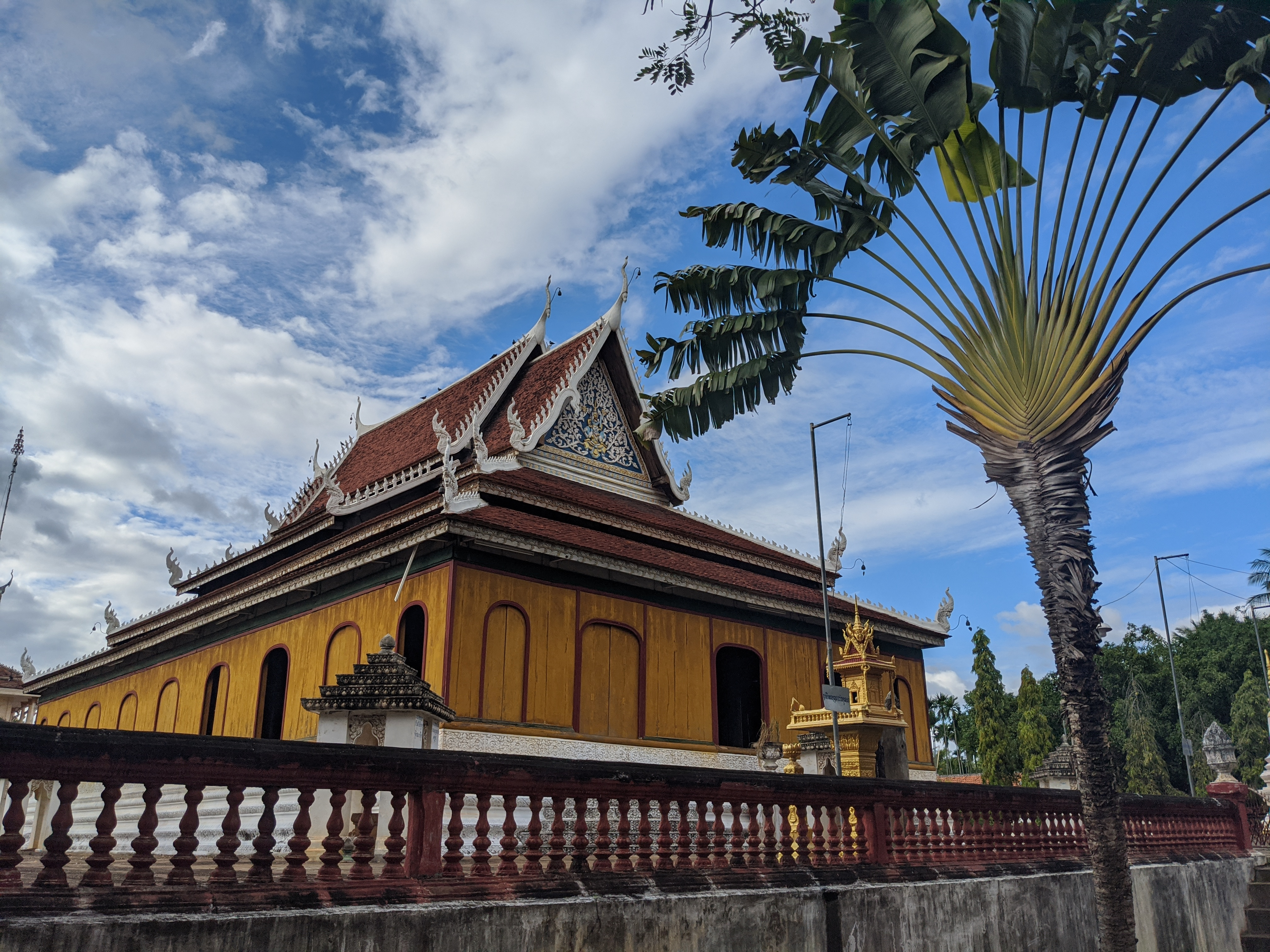

- Location within Cambodia

Religion
- Affiliation: Theravada Buddhism

Location
- Location: Koh Sotin District, Kampong Cham Province
- Country: Cambodia
- Interactive map of Wat Moha Leap វត្តមហាលាភ

Architecture
- Founder: Nil Teang
- Completed: 1906

Wat Moha Leap, or vatt Mahā Lābh (វត្តមហាលាភ), is a century-old Buddhist pagoda in Kampong Cham province, Cambodia. It is the country's last standing temple with a wooden structure.

== Etymology ==
The name of the Wat Moha Leap could literally mean "monastery of great fortune". However, a local tradition posits that it derives from the nickname of its founder, a “literate monk” (moha), who came from the village of Preak Leap (“the arroyo of good fortune”) opposite Phnom Penh, on the banks of the Tonlé Sap. It is therefore the "monastery of the venerable [coming from] Preak Leap."

== History ==
=== Sources ===
The early history of Moha Leap is known through an inscription registered as K. 1046 which once stood at the foot of the Buddha altar inside the pagoda. The inscription K. 1046 was destroyed between 1975 and 1979, but is known today from photographs taken by Claude Guioneau (1925-2017) for his friend Claude Jacques. Jacques was then a member of the French School of the Far East, which specialised in Sanskrit epigraphy of the Khmer country. This inscription was translated and interpreted by the French archeologist Olivier de Bernon in 2017.

=== Construction and dedication ===
The construction of Wat Moha Leap began on Monday February 20, 1894. The bai sema foundation stones were buried in presence of the Supreme Patriarch of Cambodia, Nil Teang, on March 16, 1906. Forty years after the end of the violence that had marked this province in an attempt by King Ang Duong to take back territories under Cham control, the construction or reconstruction of the Wat Moha Leap under royal patronage proceeded from the enterprise of reappropriation of this territory by the Khmers.

The Wat Moha Leap became one of Nil Teang's resort monasteries.

In 1925, the General Government of Indochina as part of its action in favor of artistic remains established a classification of historical monuments of Indochina; though it included 703 structures in Cambodia, not a single monastery was deemed worthy of this classification, not even Moha Leap.

In 1931, French ethnologist George Groslier celebrated the exceptional beauty of Wat Moha Leap :

I have just left the beautiful Duchess of Moha Leap […] Fifty years is old for a Cambodian! [...] One can consider it as one of the flowers of Cambodian art of the late 19th century […] Thirty-three years ago, a master gilder illuminated the sixty columns, from bottom to top [...] Ah! How I like to have found on these banks of the Tonlé Touch the most beautiful pagoda that I know.

— George Groslier, Eaux et lumières. Journal de route sur le Mékong cambodgien

=== From development to dismantlement: from the Sangkum to the Khmers Rouges ===
In 1958, during the Sangkum era, a new pond was dug near to the pagoda in a project to develop the self-reliance of Moha Leap as well as 14 other monasteries.

The neighbouring monastery of Wat Domnak Preng (Ṭaṃṇāk ’Brīṅ) was annihilated during the American bombardments of July 5, 1970, which -in a few minutes- killed all the religious present and all the civilian population who believed they could find protection there. In 1974, after the B-52 bombardments in the area, a monk of the monastery, Im Chhom, published a short story of Poukambo, also known as Achar Leak, an early pioneer of Khmer nationalism.

During the Khmers rouges communist regime, after monkhood was disbanded, sections of the pagoda were converted into basic medical facilities, a transformation well attested throughout the country. The one-hundred-year-old decorated columns were apparently smeared with mud before the building was converted into a dormitory for the region's medical staff.

A drainage canal known as the "monk channel" was built by forced monastic labour near the pagoda. Ta Sim, the cau adhikār (Abbot) of Wat Moha Leap wore white after being forcibly deprived of his yellow robes; he died of starvation in 1981.

In 1986, in the context of the Cambodian-Vietnamese War, the national army of Cambodia successfully attacked the Vietnamese troops in the vicinity of the Moha Leap pagoda.

=== From rot to renewal: the restoration of Moha Leap ===
In 2005, new bai sema foundation stones were installed after the old one had been knocked down.

In 2011, a few columns had to be replaced after they were eaten up by termites.

In 2013, an alarming report was made by the Ministry for Culture and Fine Arts, warning about the consequences of leaks in the roof and rotting pillars which endangered the whole structure and its precious paintings. The ensuing restoration of Wat Moha Leap was highly praised as one that “could serve as a role model for such an approach”.

== Architecture ==
Raised on a high base, the imposing temple, twenty-five meters long, supported by sixty wooden posts thirty to forty centimeters in diameter and closed by plank walls, is the only ancient temple entirely built of wood preserved in Cambodia.

Although somewhat distorted in the 1990s, the buildings of this monastery still offer one of the finest examples of Khmer religious architecture from the beginning of the 20th century. They form a vast set of residential and teaching buildings in masonry - unfortunately recently replaced by less remarquable constructions - in the center of which stood several wooden buildings which, luckily, still remain. The most remarkable of these wooden buildings is the “sanctuary” (vihear) whose supporting structures, pillars and centerpieces of the frame, are entirely covered with black lacquer adorned with hand-painted gold leaf stencils .

The basement of the sanctuary has an elevation that rises to one meter ninety. It has no surrounding gallery.

As a typical feature in the time of Sisowath, convex steps led directly up to the shrine.

Twenty-four windows are covered by semicircular or depressed arches.

One can also see, near the sanctuary, an exceptional “passage cell” (braḥ banlā) offered by King Norodom to the Supreme Patriarch Nil Teang at the turn of the twentieth century.

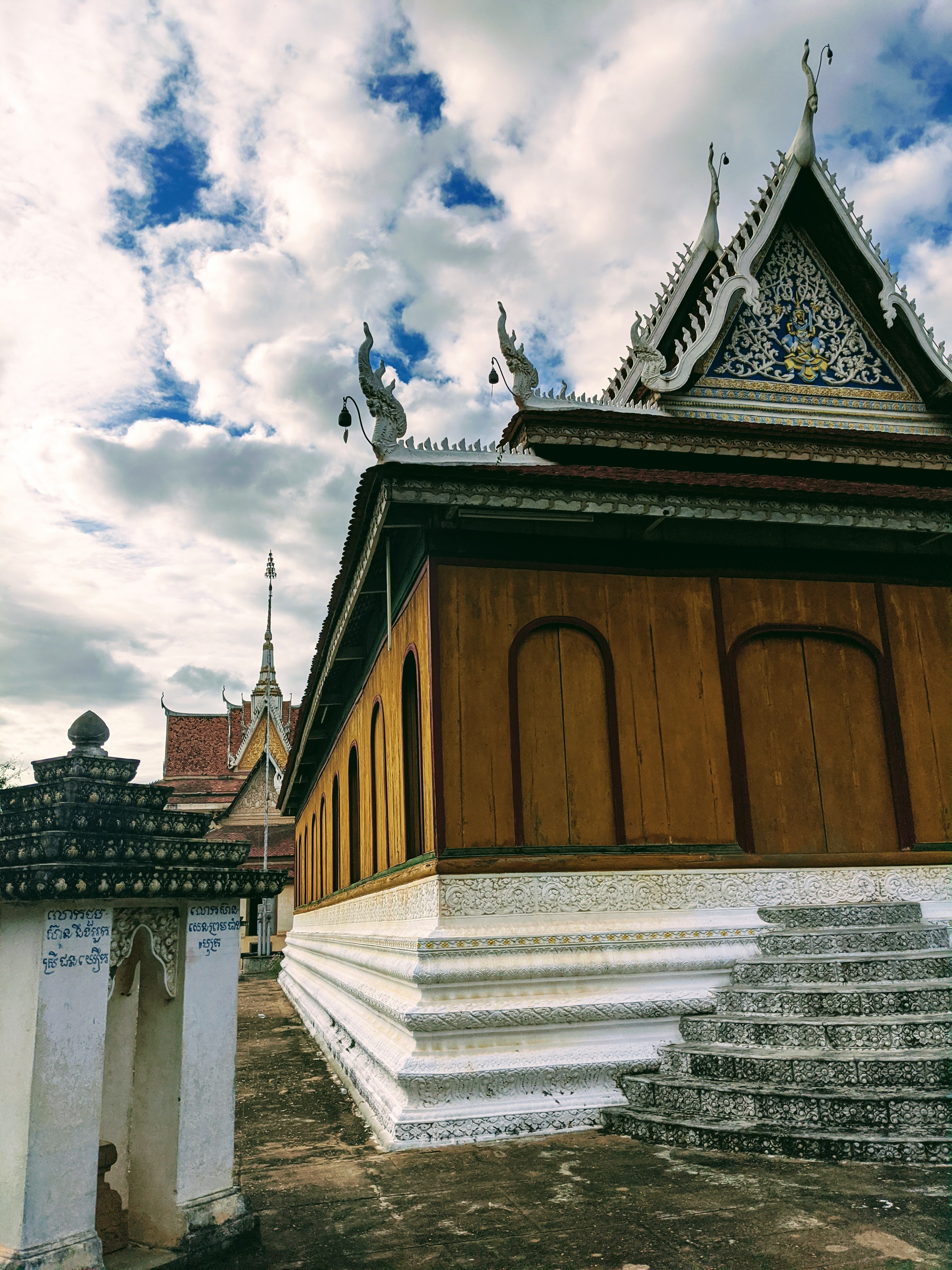
As a typical feature in the time of Sisowath, convex steps led directly up to the shrine.

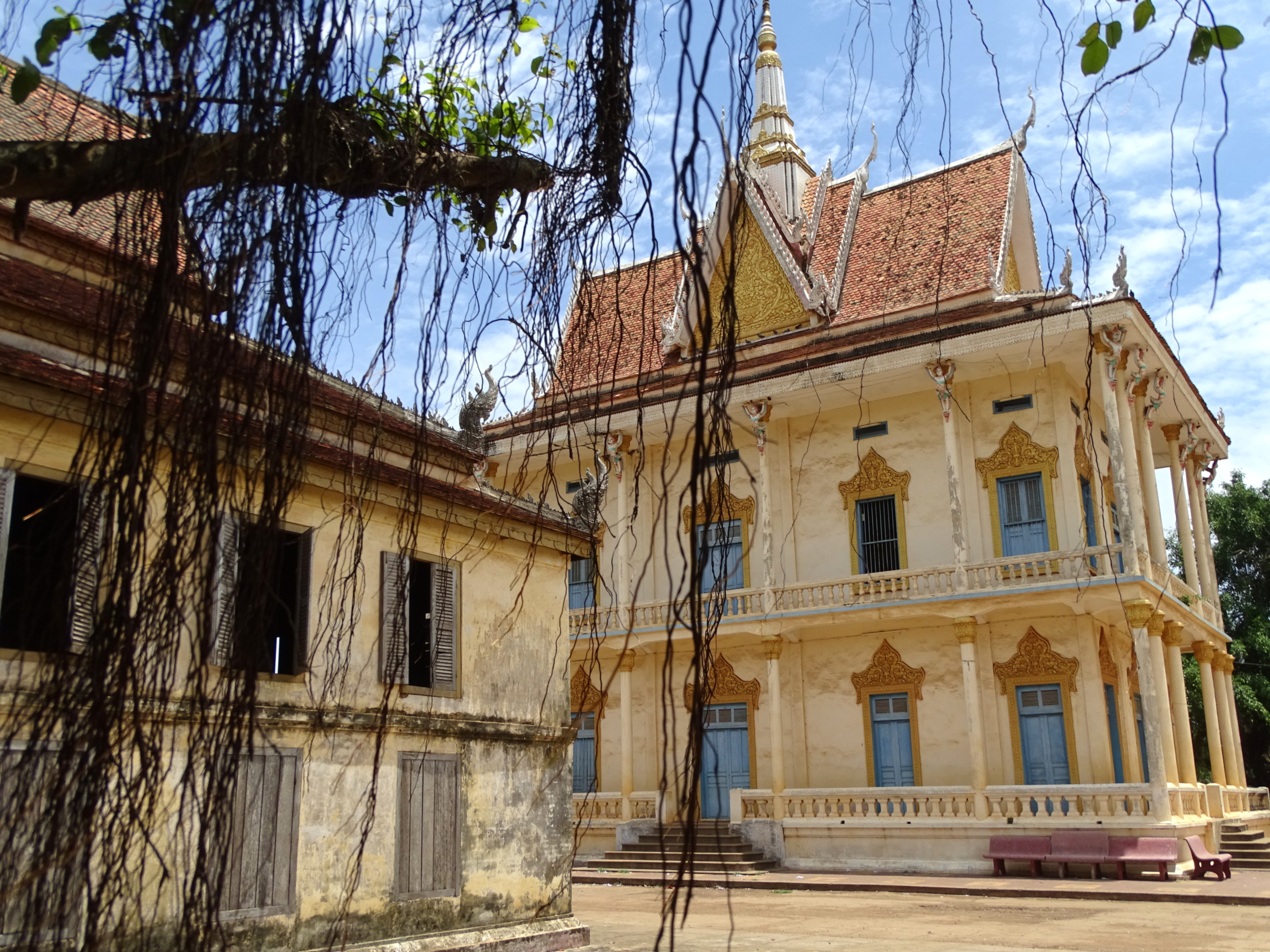

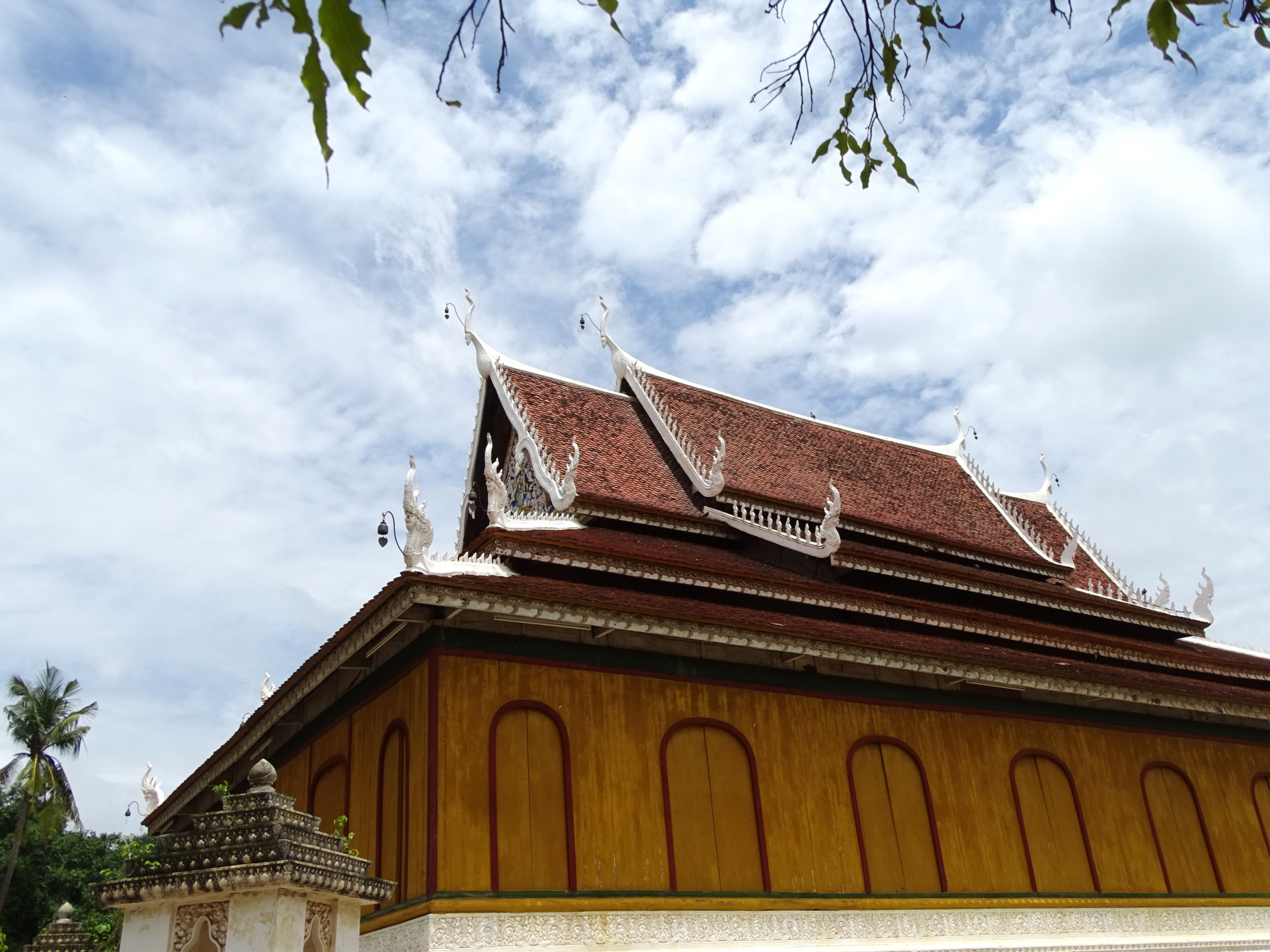

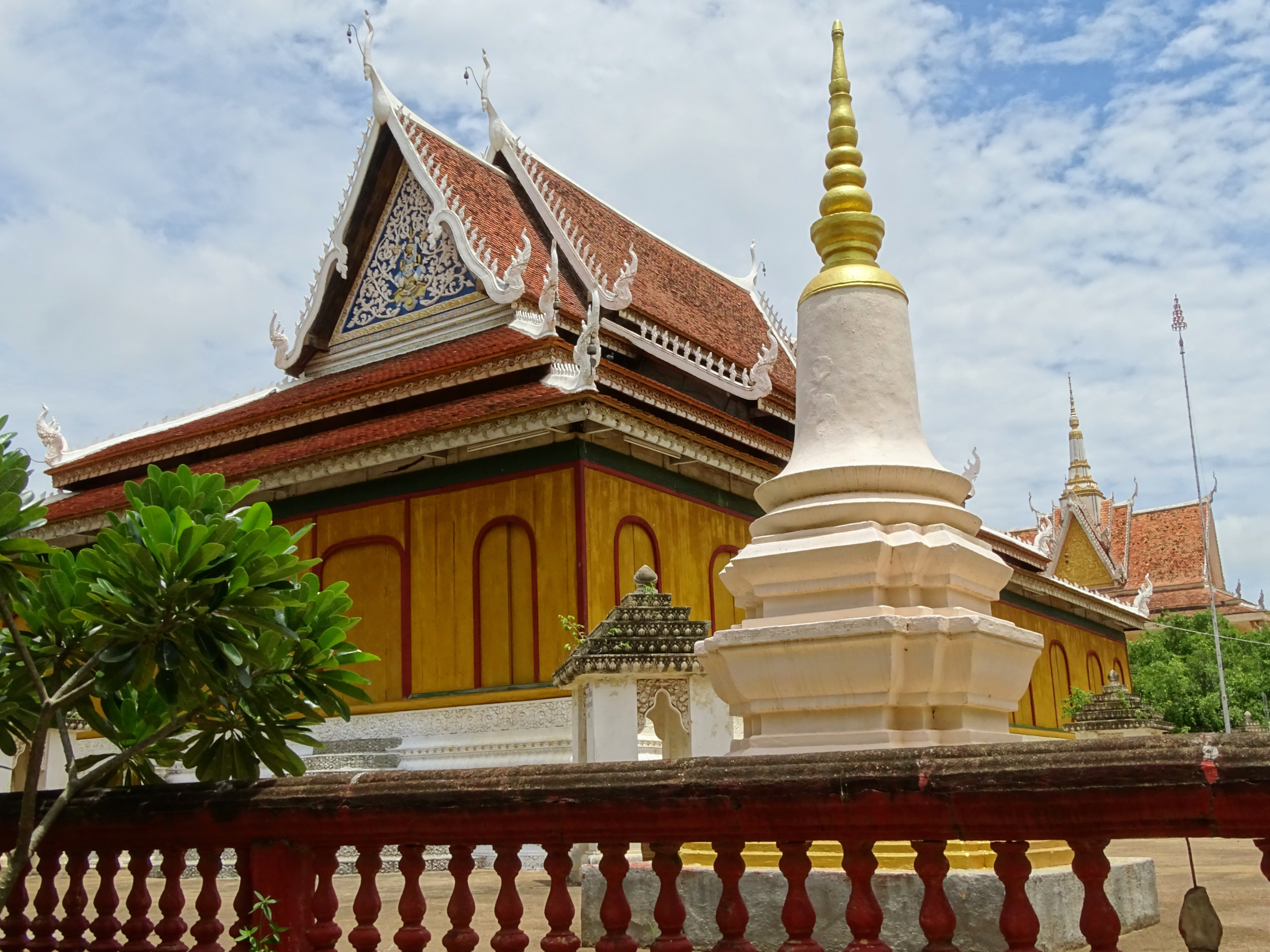

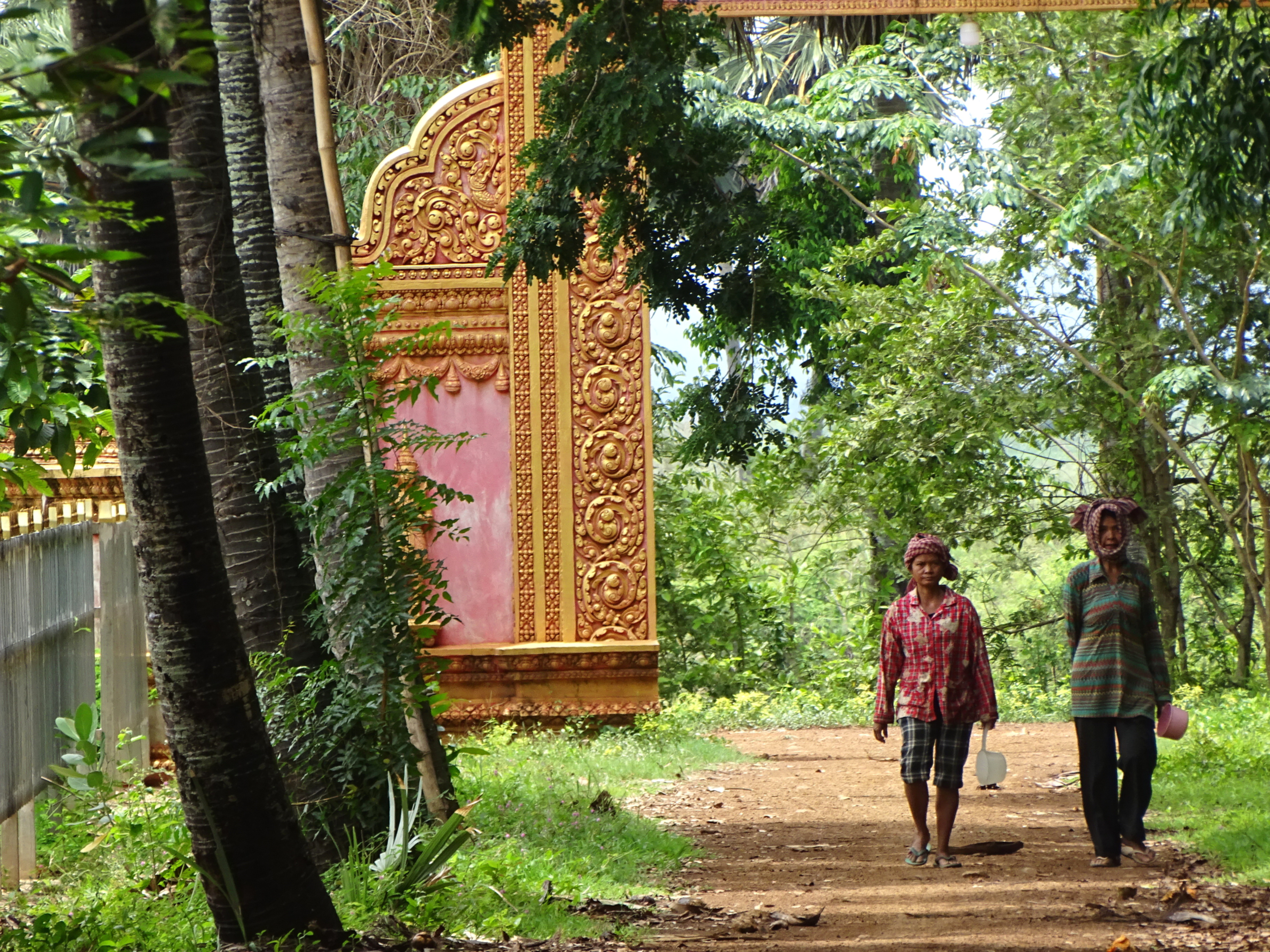
Garden near Khmer Rouge Mass Burial Site

== Decoration ==
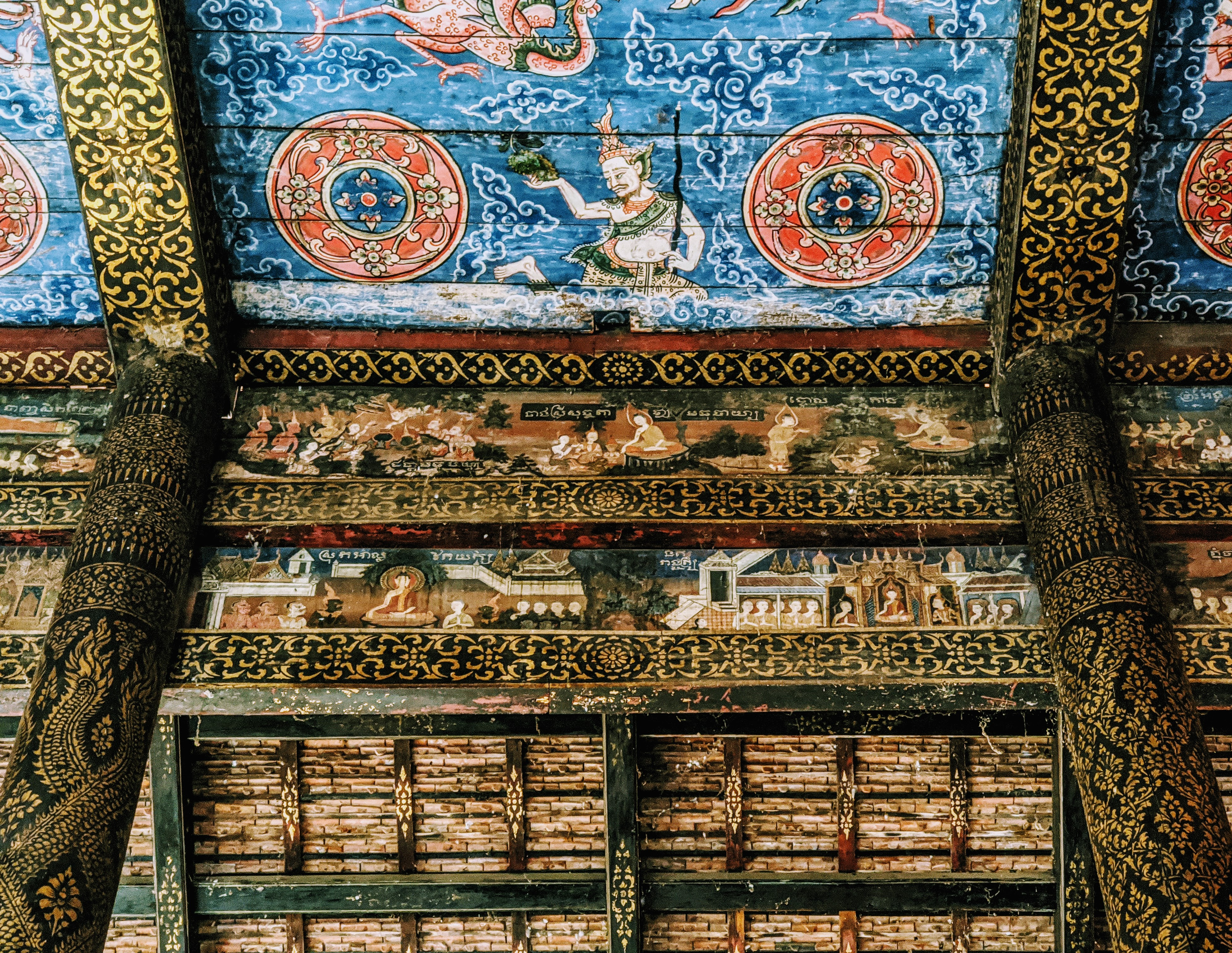
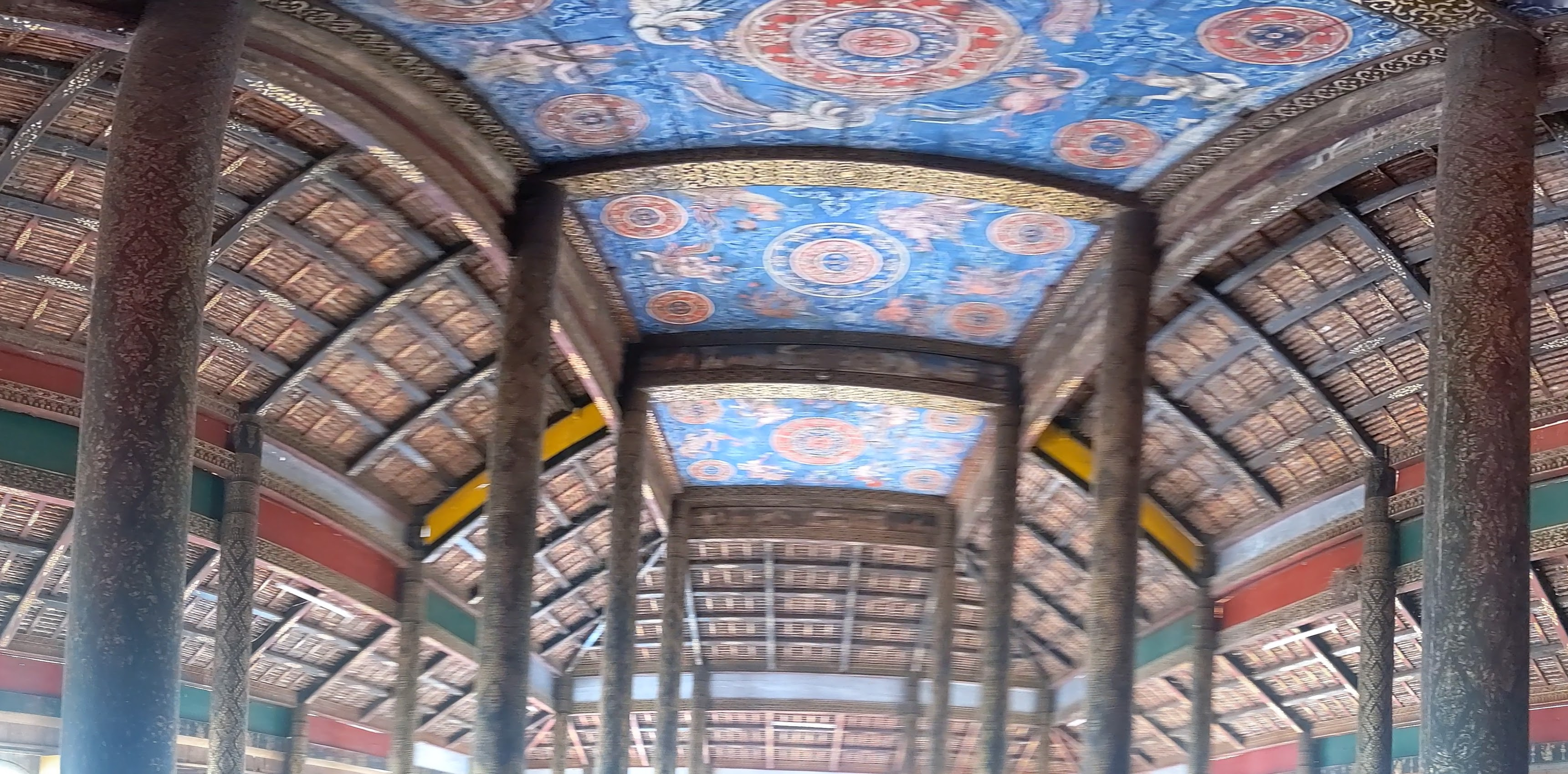
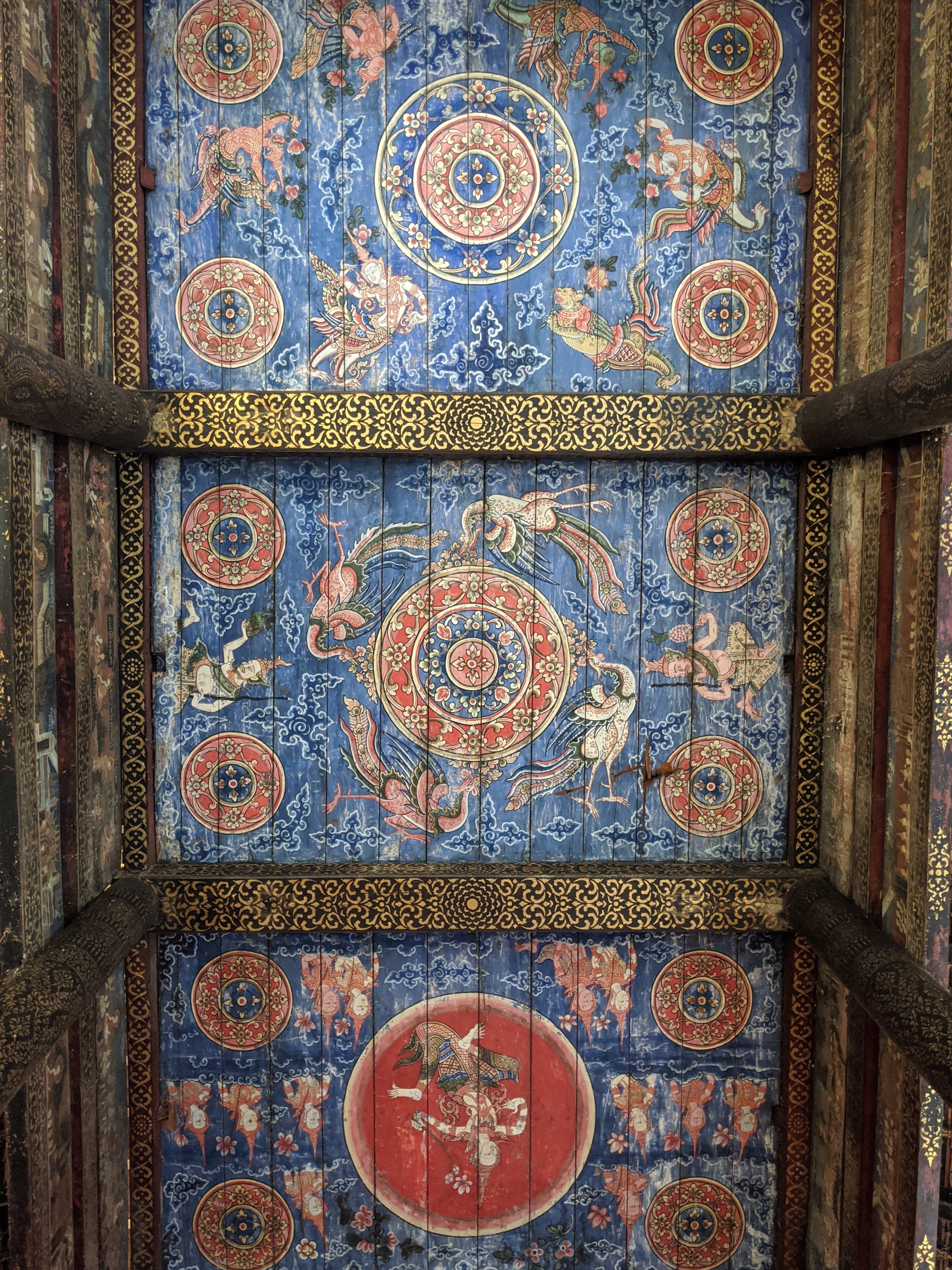
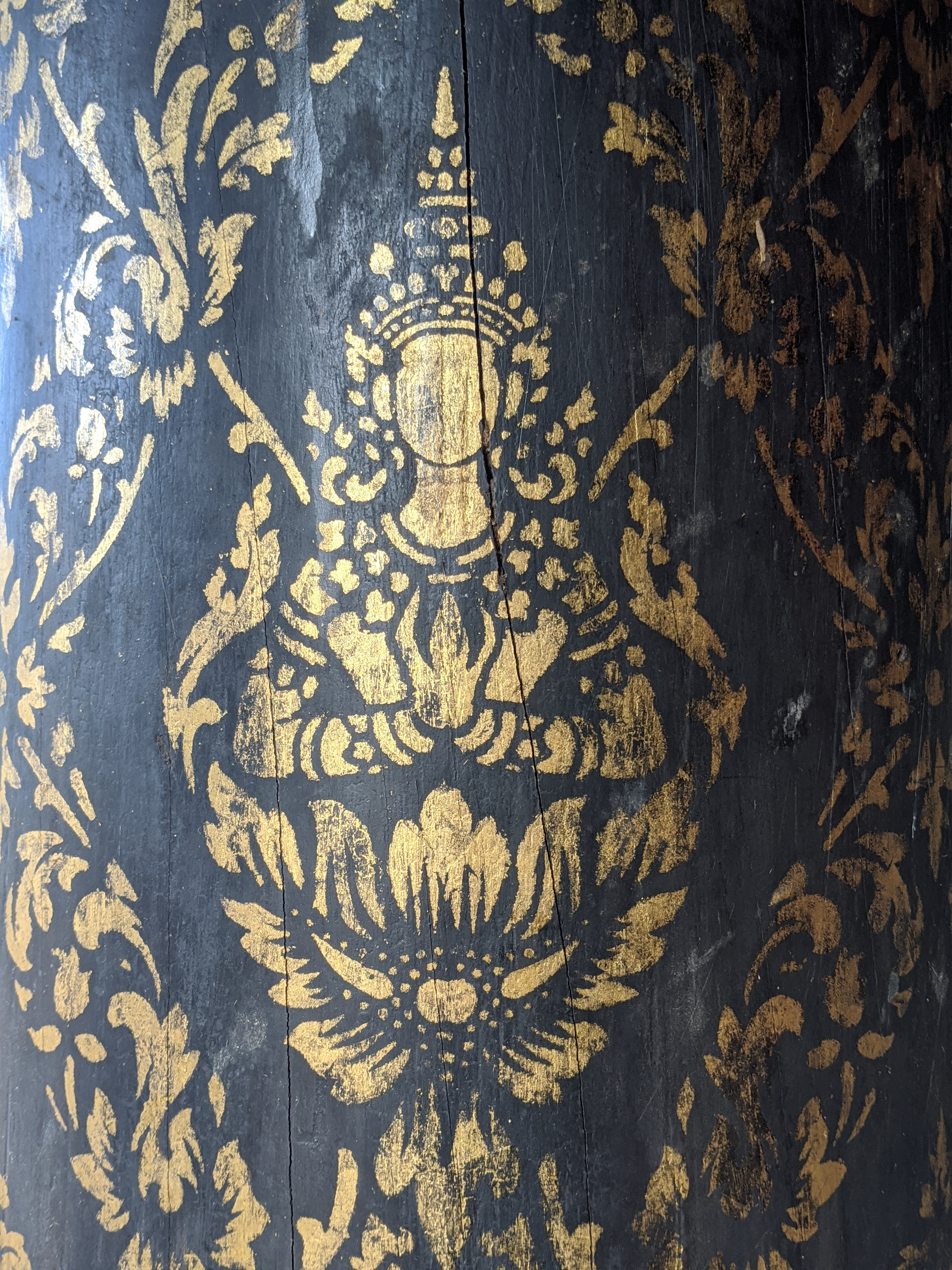
Paintings inside the sanctuary of Moha Leap

Wat Moha Leap has one of the most richly decorated sanctuaries in Cambodia: black and gold lacquers adorn the columns, a frieze unites the pillars and paintings cover the ceilings of the four median bays of the nave.

The paintings of the ceiling of the second bay are surrounded by four phoenixes and two ascetics on the second span, then, on the last two spans, by mythical beings, with a detailed representation of a kinnari, a celestial musician, part human and part bird, a musically paradigmatic lover, in Hinduism and Buddhism.

Photographic images dated to 1929 show lotus canopies in place above Buddha images at each of the two naves, a practise common in Cambodia since Angkorian times and still seen on a stone lintel above a doorway at Angkor Wat. These canopies, which usually shelter the seat or the seated Buddha, just as the lotus flower covers the earth, have not been replaced.

== Bibliography ==
- de Bernon, Olivier (2017). "L'inscription du Wat Moha Leap K. 1046". Bulletin de l'École française d'Extrême-Orient. 103: 433–452. ISSN 0336-1519. JSTOR 26477886.
