= Kizuna Bridge =

Bridge in Kampong Cham, Cambodia

Kizuna Bridge ស្ពានគីហ្សុណា
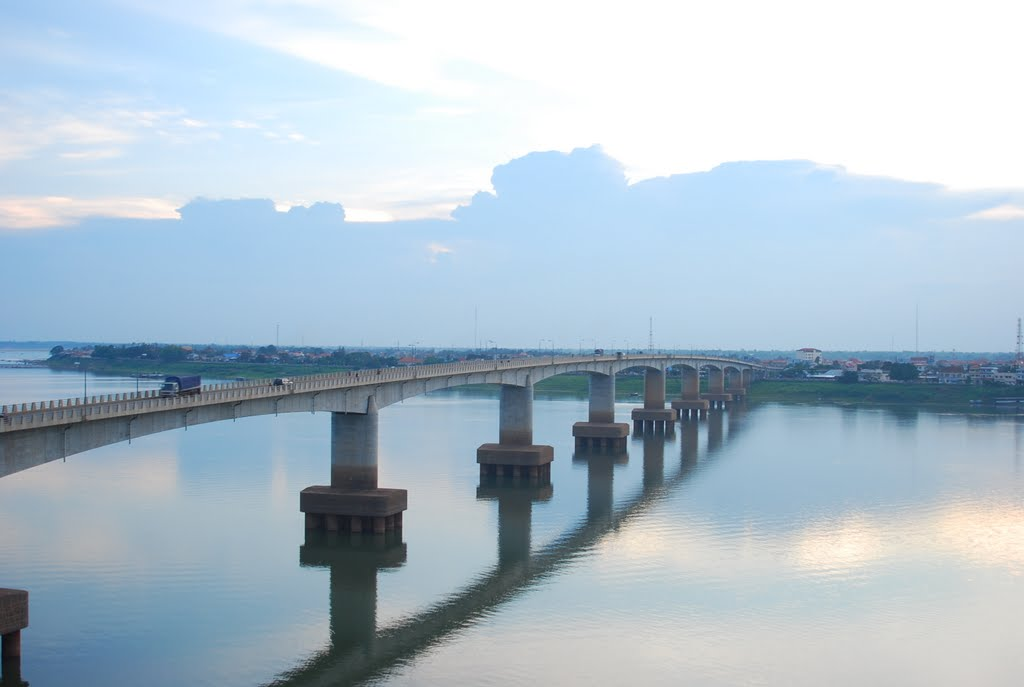
- Coordinates: 12°00′00″N 105°27′00″E
- Crosses: Mekong River
- Locale: Kampong Cham, Cambodia

Characteristics
- Total length: 1,500 m
- Longest span: 170 m

History
- Opened: 4 December 2001

Location
- Interactive map of Kizuna Bridge

The Kizuna Bridge (Note: Khmer: ស្ពានគីហ្សុណា, romanized: Spéan Kihsŏna; Khmer pronunciation: [spiən kiːzonaː]) is a bridge on the Mekong River in the city of Kampong Cham, Kampong Cham Province.

It was opened in 2001 and was the first bridge to be built over the Mekong River in Cambodia.

== Construction ==
Construction of the bridge was funded by a $56-million grant from the Japanese government. At 1500 metres it was the longest bridge in Cambodia until the 2002 construction of the Koh Kong Bridge, a 1900-metre Thai-Cambodian bridge in Koh Kong. The Kizuna bridge links eastern and western Cambodia by road for the first time. Construction of the bridge began in 1999, and took three years to complete. An estimated 10,000 people crowded the bridge for the opening ceremony.

== Gallery ==
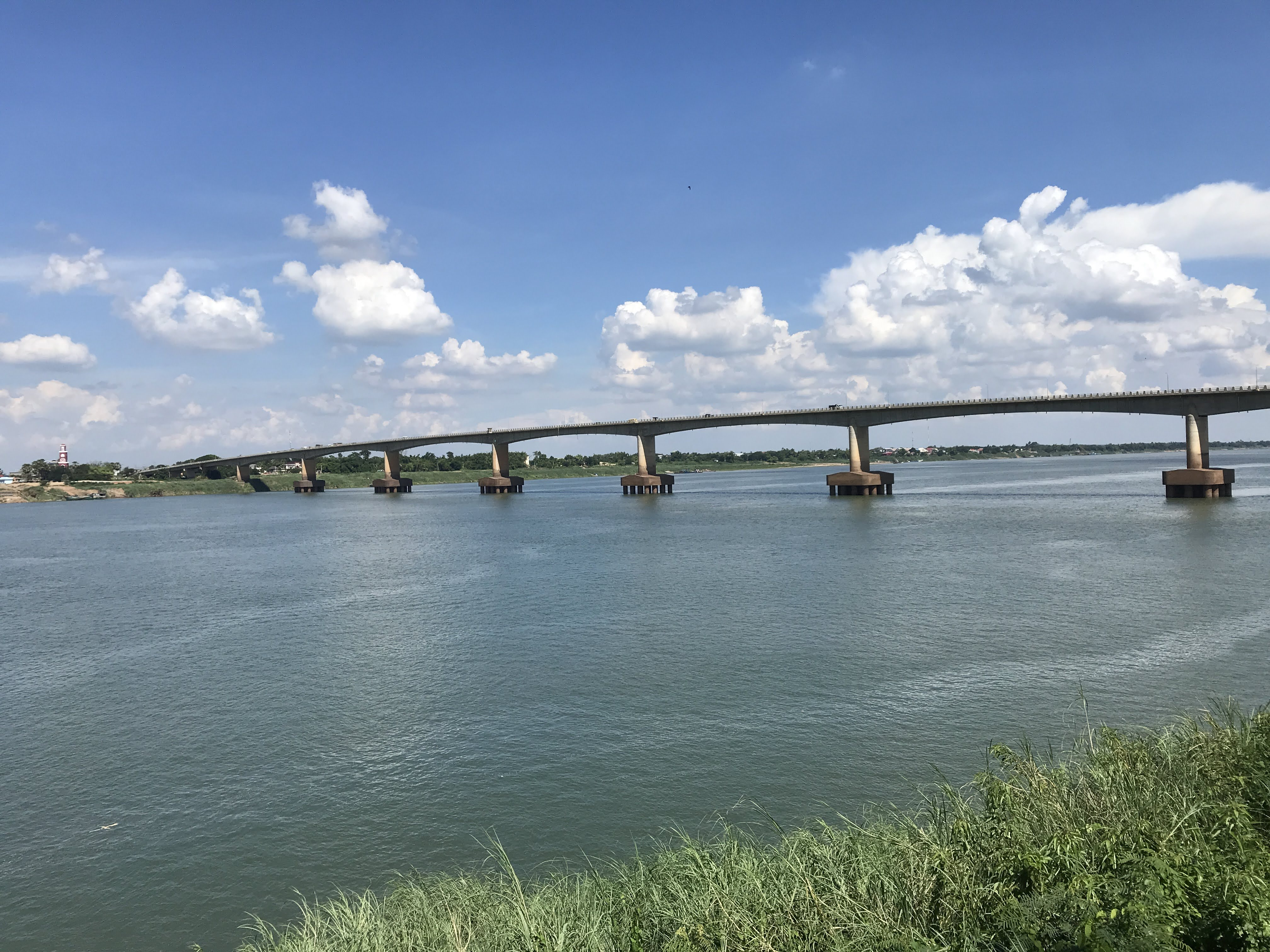
Kizuna Bridge in 2020

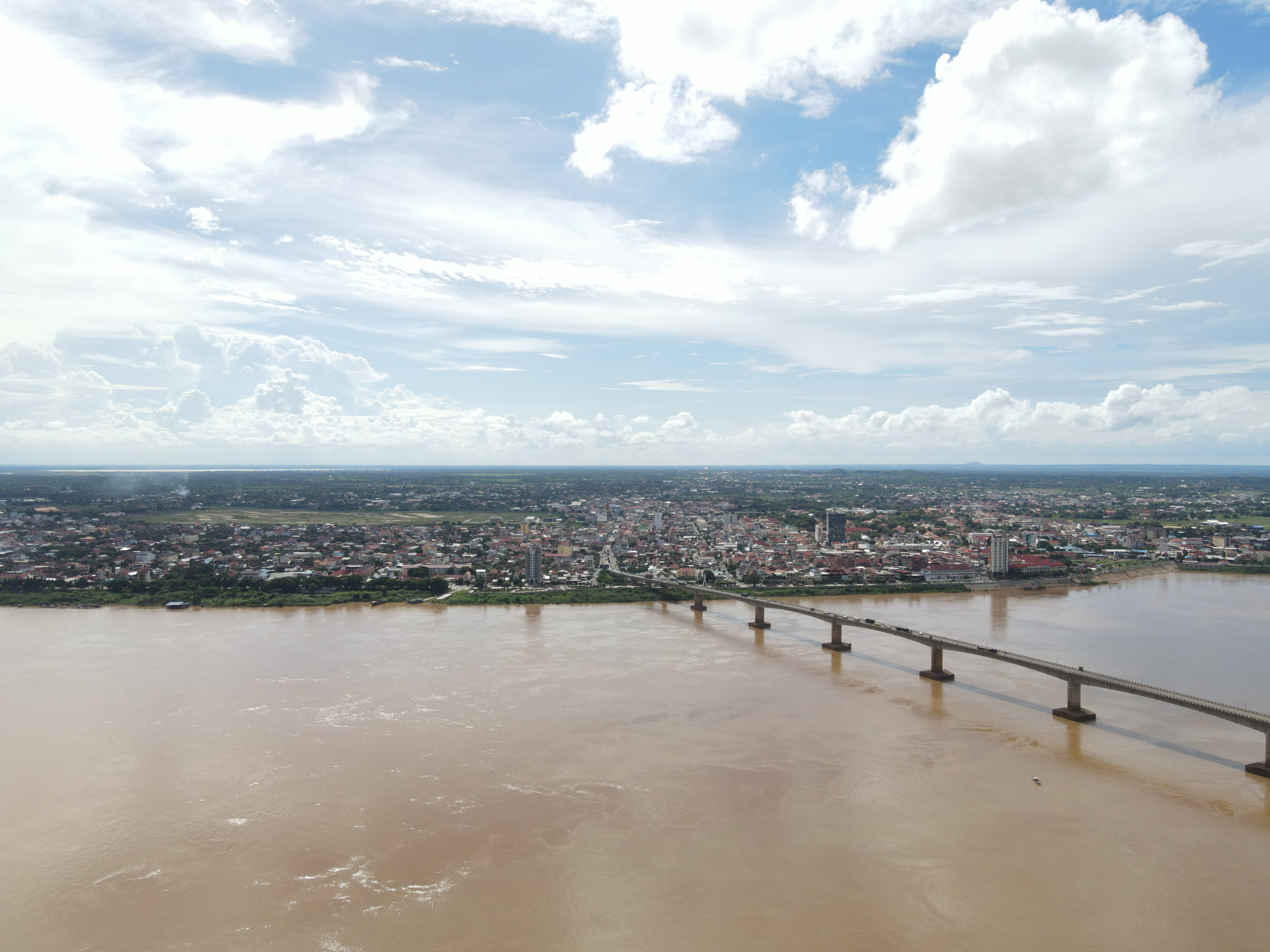
Aerial View of Kizuna Bridge and Kampong Cham City

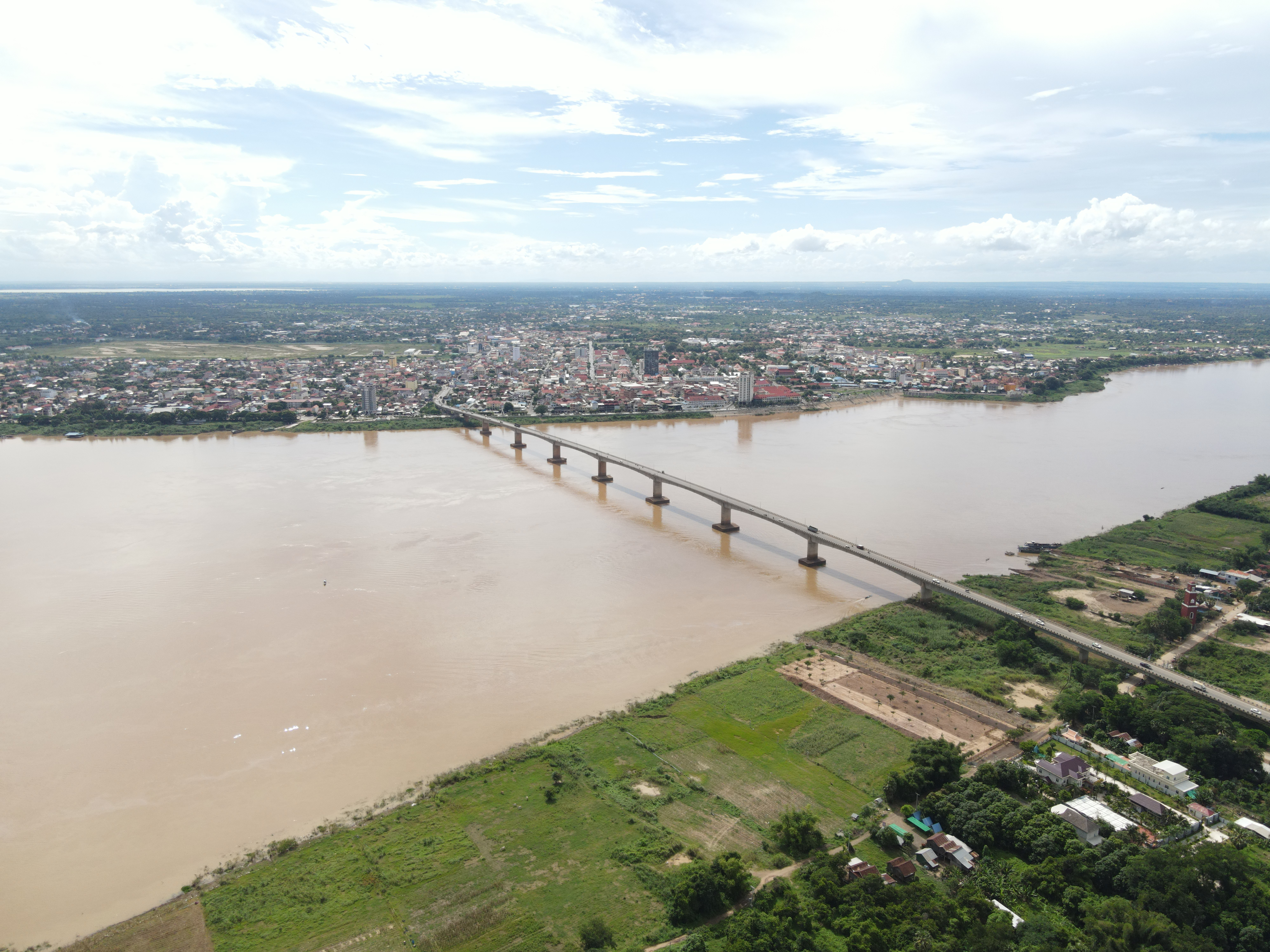
Kizuna Bridge
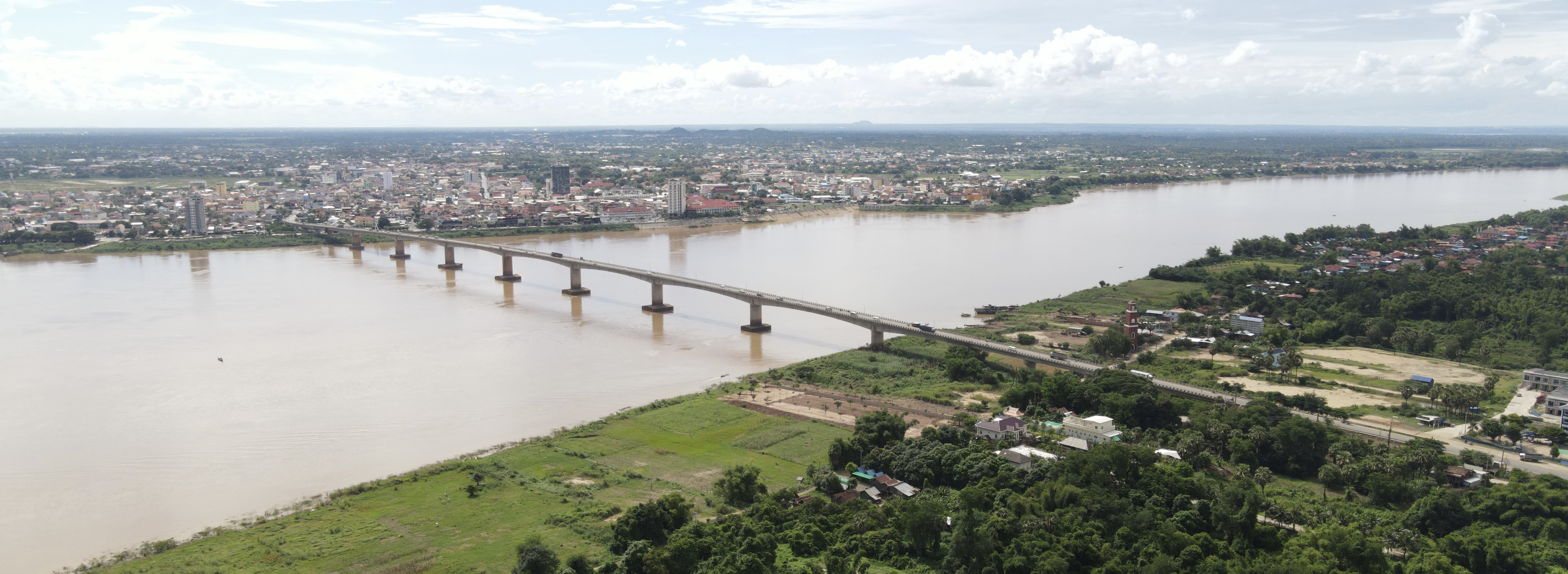
Panoramic View of Kizuna Bridge and Kampong Cham
