= Kampong Cham (city) =

Kampong Cham កំពង់ចាម
- City
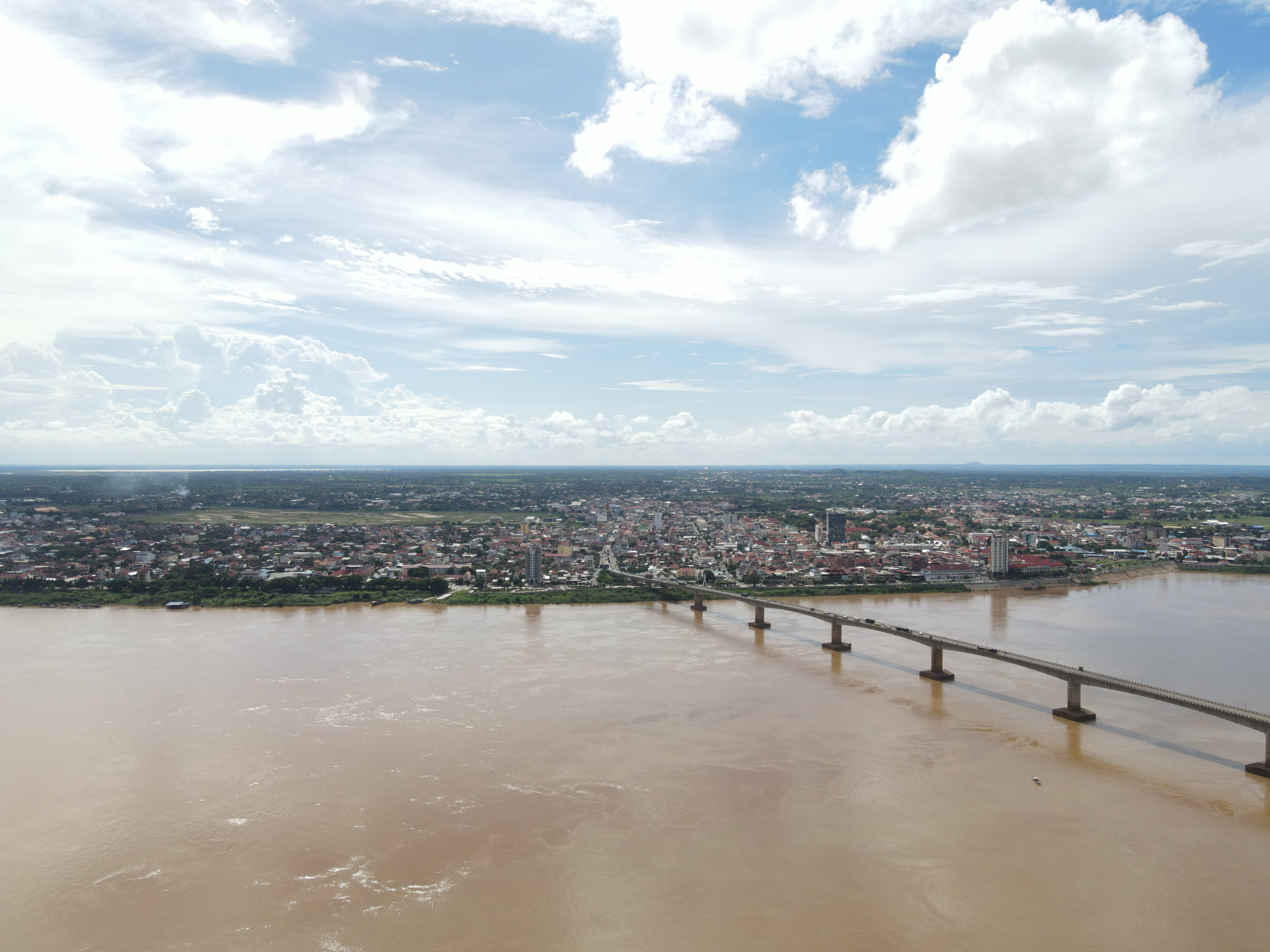
- Kizuna Bridge and The City

- Location within Cambodia
- Coordinates: 11°59′13.3″N 105°27′43.3″E
- Country: Cambodia
- Province: Kampong Cham
- Municipality: Kampong Cham
- Elevation: 20 m (66 ft)

Population (2019)
  - Total: 61,750
- Time zone: UTC+07:00 (ICT)

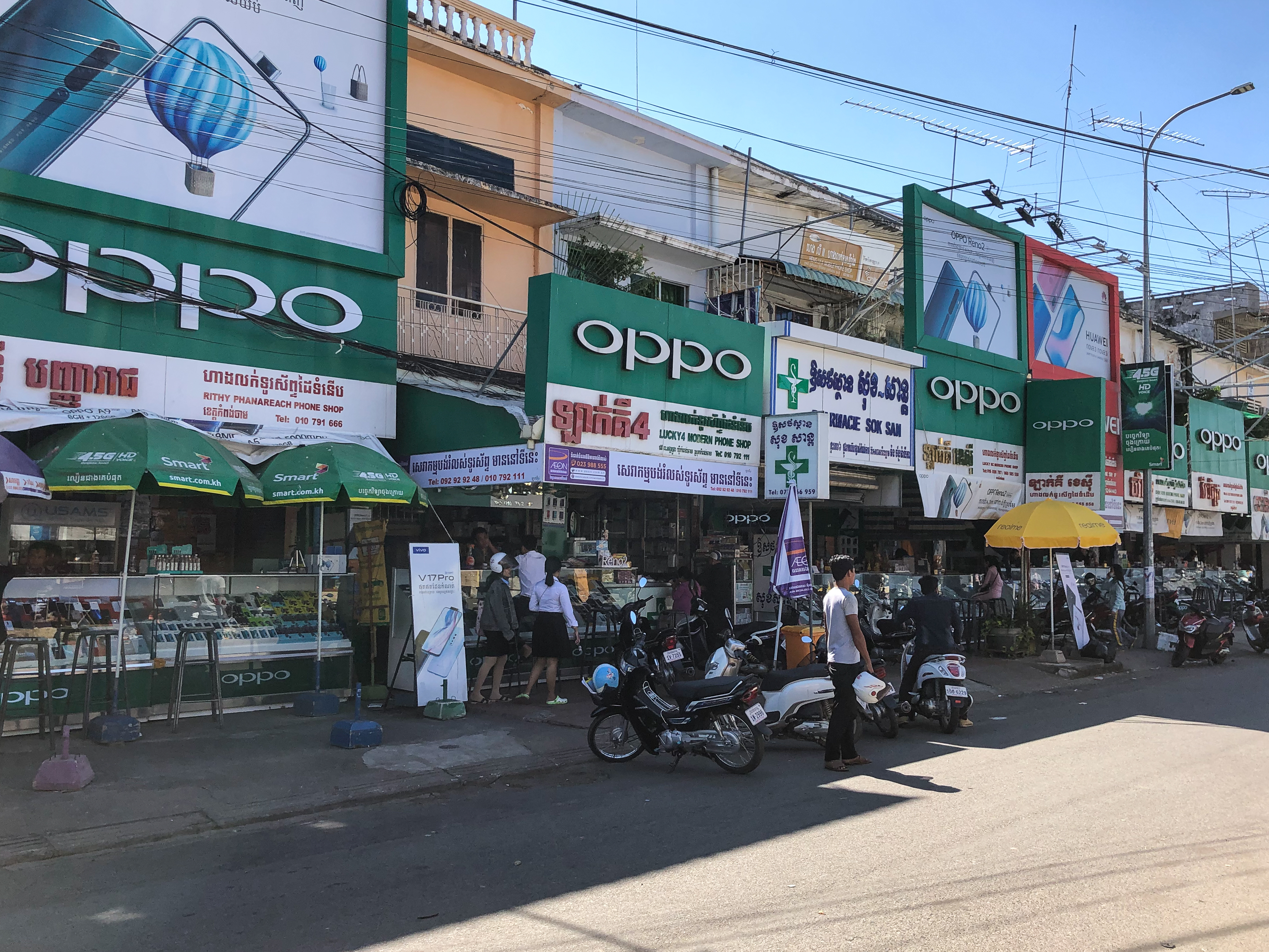
Shops in the city

Kampong Cham (Khmer: កំពង់ចាម, UNGEGN: Kâmpóng Cham [kɑmpɔŋ caːm]; lit. 'The chams Port') is the capital city of Kampong Cham Province in southeastern Cambodia. It is the 12th largest city in Cambodia with a population of 61,750 people (2021) and is located on the Mekong River. Kampong Cham is 124 kilometers northeast from the national capital Phnom Penh. It takes about 2.5 hours to travel from Phnom Penh to Kampong Cham and vice-versa by boat or a motorized vehicle on asphalt road.

The city is connected to the district of Tbong khmum by the Kizuna bridge, the first in Cambodia to span the Mekong.

== Administrative division ==
The city is subdivided into four districts and 32 villages.

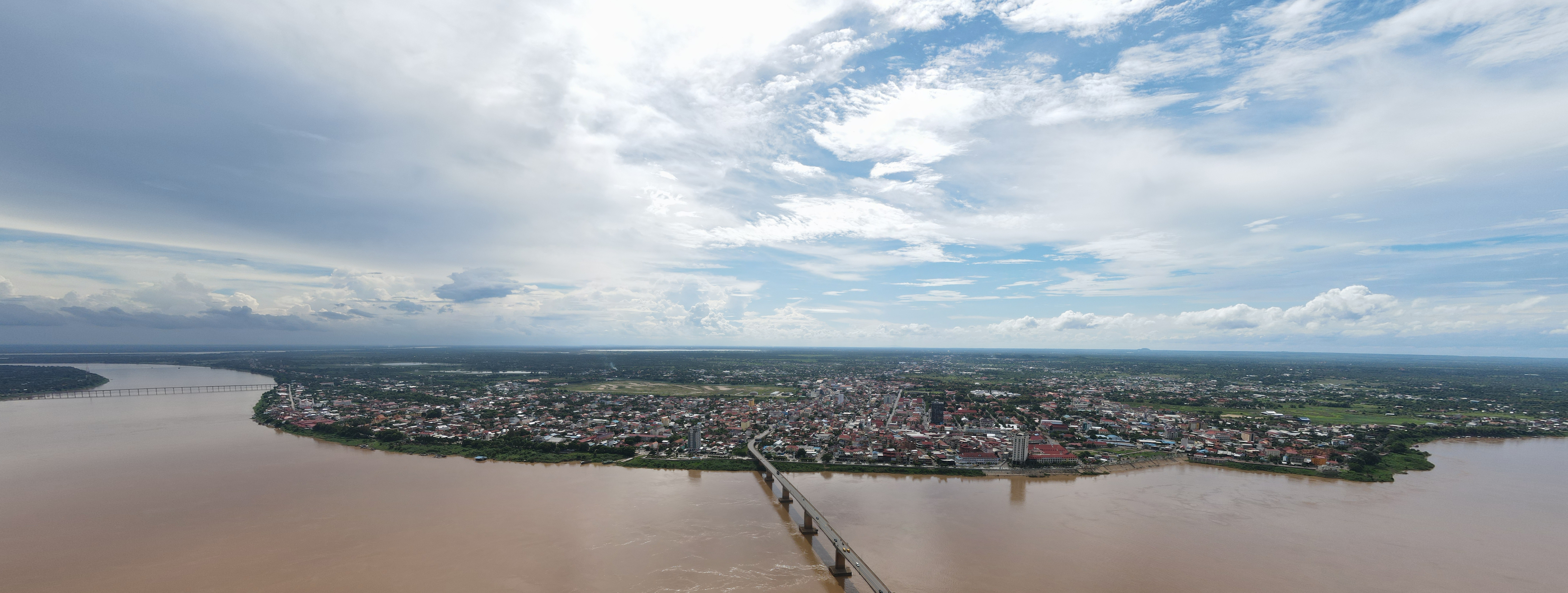
Aerial View of Kampong Cham City

== Politics ==
The indirect election of the city council in 2014 gave the presidency to CPP which has won 11 out of the 15 seats in the city council, while CNRP won the rest.

== Sport ==
Kampong Cham has a great outdoor Olympic size 50 meter swimming pool with 5 and 10 meter diving boards. As of January 2020 the entry cost was US$2. There is a swim club, coached by Japanese volunteers.

== Climate ==
The city has a tropical climate. When compared with winter, the summers have much more rainfall. This location is classified as Aw by Köppen and Geiger. The average annual temperature in Kampong Cham is 27.7 °C. Precipitation here averages 1721 mm per year.

Climate data for Kampong Cham (1982–2024)
Month	Jan	Feb	Mar	Apr	May	Jun	Jul	Aug	Sep	Oct	Nov	Dec	Year
Mean daily maximum °C (°F)	31.1 (88.0)	32.9 (91.2)	34.5 (94.1)	35.0 (95.0)	34.1 (93.4)	33.2 (91.8)	32.3 (90.1)	31.6 (88.9)	31.0 (87.8)	30.8 (87.4)	29.3 (84.7)	29.9 (85.8)	32.1 (89.8)
Mean daily minimum °C (°F)	23.3 (73.9)	24.4 (75.9)	25.9 (78.6)	26.9 (80.4)	26.7 (80.1)	26.3 (79.3)	26.0 (78.8)	25.9 (78.6)	25.8 (78.4)	25.4 (77.7)	24.6 (76.3)	22.9 (73.2)	25.3 (77.6)
Average precipitation mm (inches)	13.7 (0.54)	7.0 (0.28)	48.1 (1.89)	94.9 (3.74)	177.8 (7.00)	197.7 (7.78)	167.5 (6.59)	174.7 (6.88)	254.6 (10.02)	250.3 (9.85)	87.5 (3.44)	18.8 (0.74)	1,492.6 (58.75)
Average relative humidity (%)	67	66	66	68	76	79	79	81	83	81	76	72	75
Source 1: World Meteorological Organization
Source 2: Weatherbase (humidity)

== See also ==
- Cham people
- Cham language
