= Kampong Cham province =

Province of Cambodia

Kampong Cham Province ខេត្តកំពង់ចាម
- Province

Khmer transcription(s)
  - Khmer: ខេត្តកំពង់ចាម
  - UNGEGN: Khaet Kǎmpǒng Cham
  - ALA-LC: Khett Kaṃbáng Cām
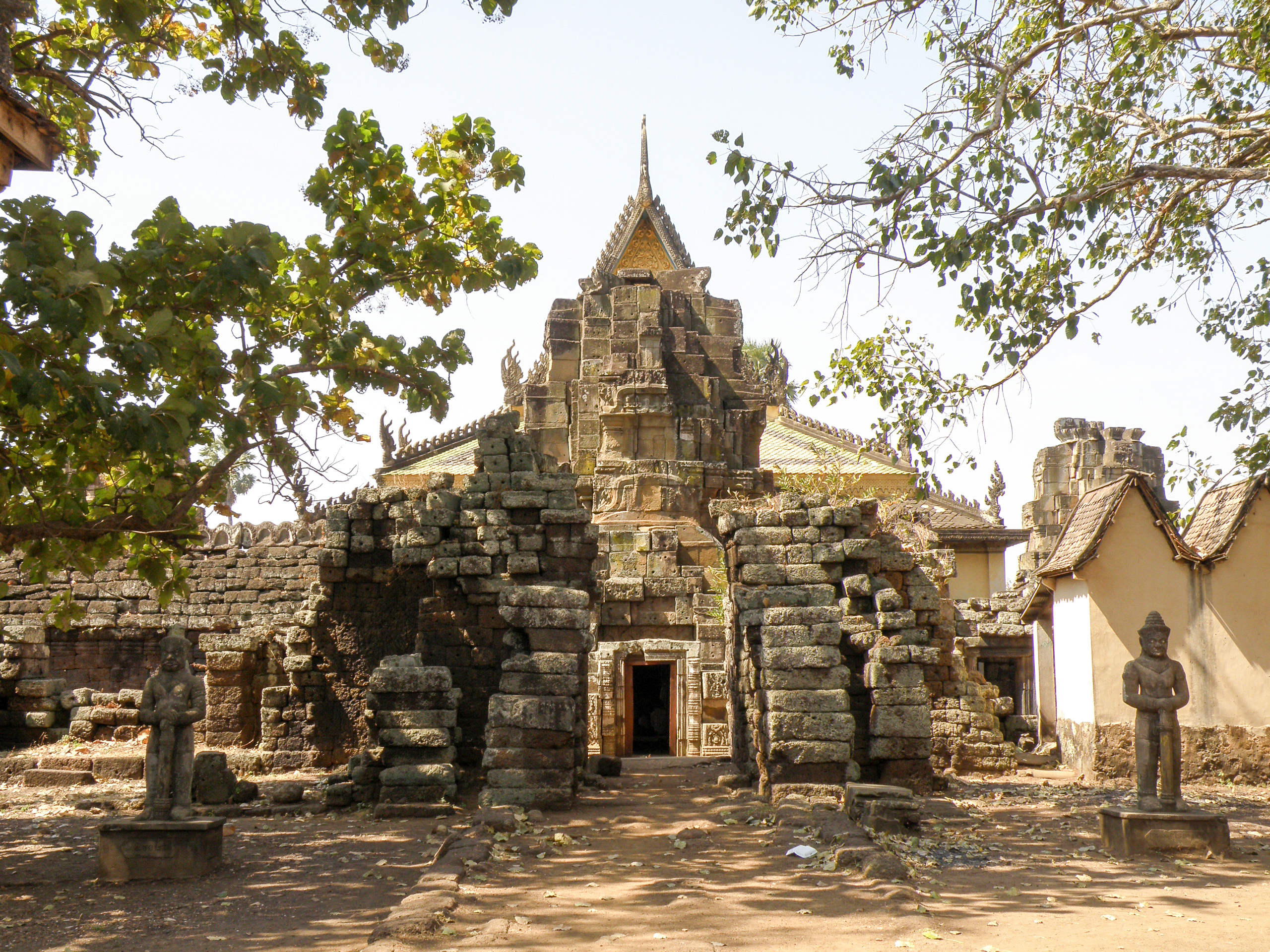
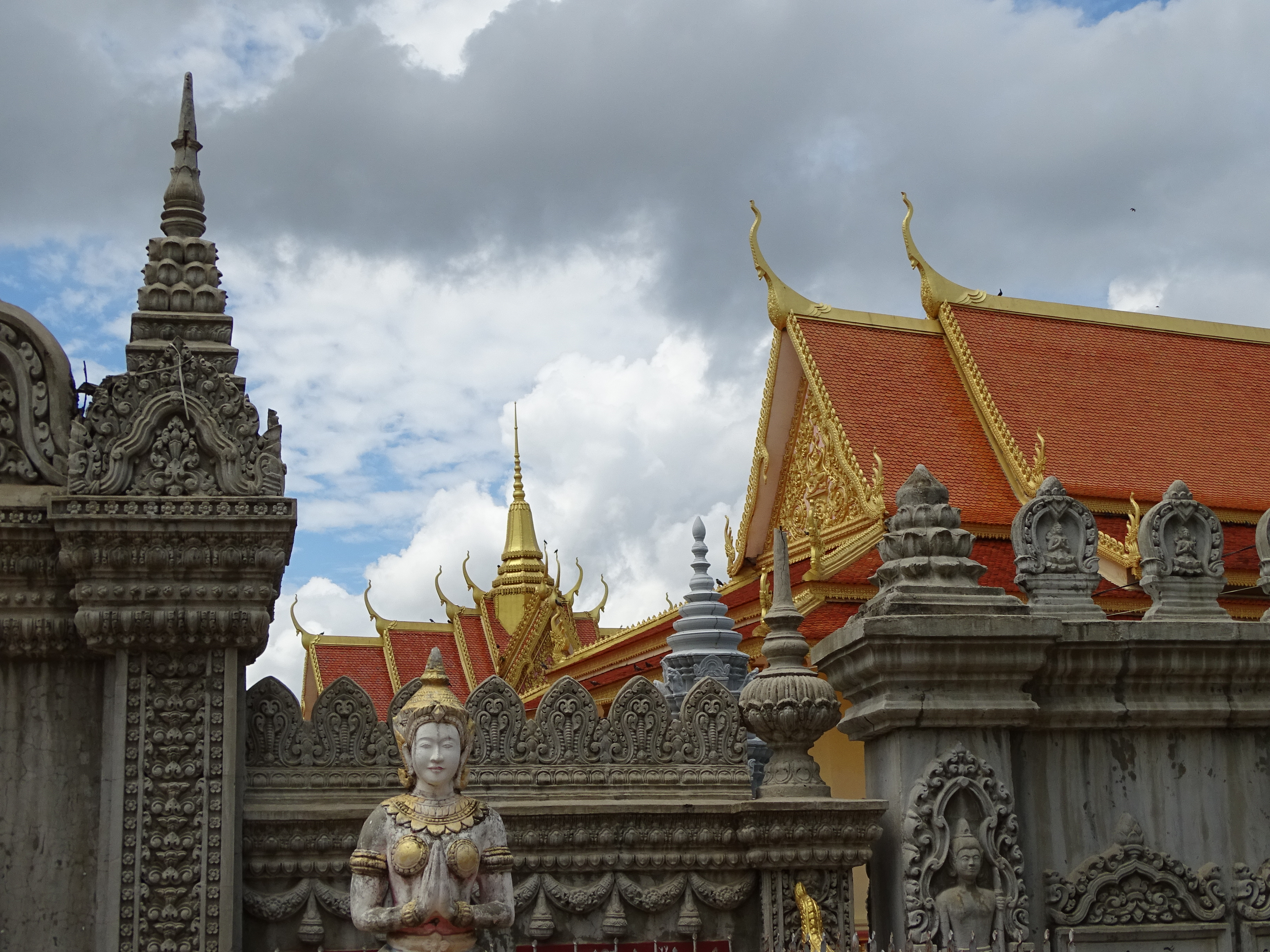
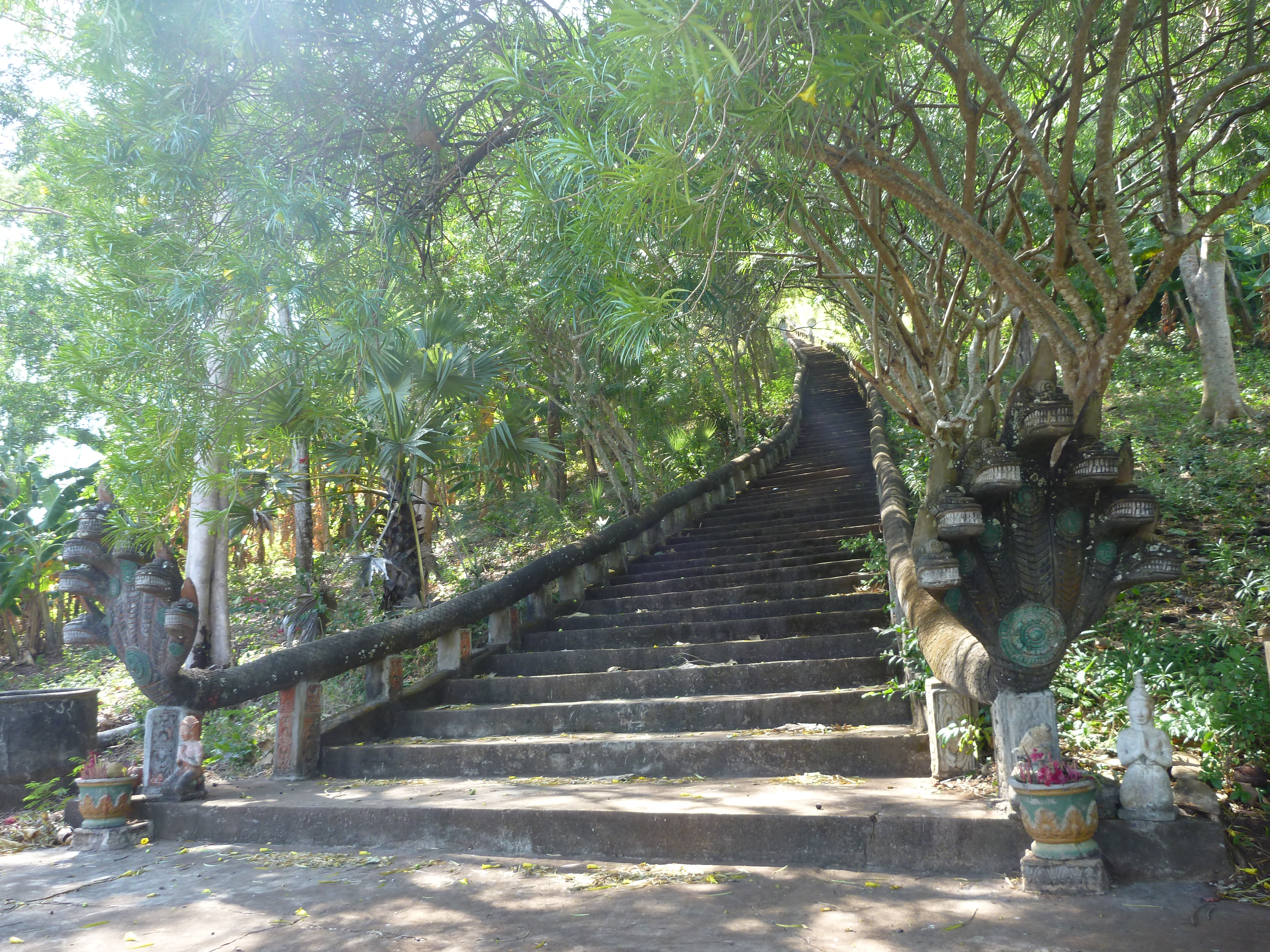
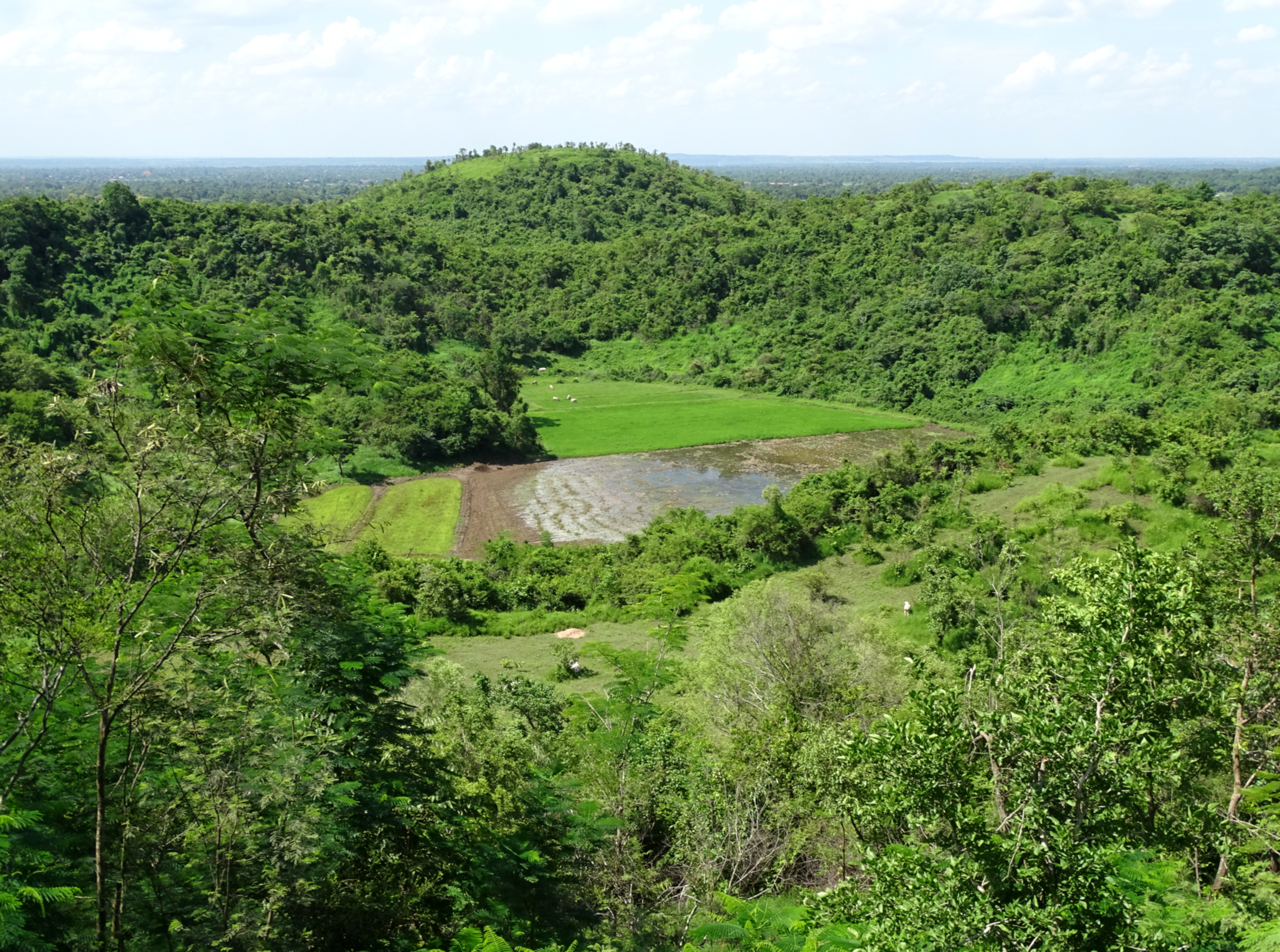
- From top: Wat Nokor, Wat Dey Doh, Bos Knoar Hill, Phnom Srei

- Seal

- Map of Cambodia highlighting Kampong Cham
- Coordinates: 11°59′N 105°27′E
- Country: Cambodia
- Provincial status: 1 January 1885
- Tboung Khmum division: 31 December 2013
- Capital: Kampong Cham
- Subdivisions: 1 municipality; 9 districts

Government
  - Governor: Un Chanda (CPP)
  - National Assembly: 10 / 125

Area
  - Total: 4,549 km^{2} (1,756 sq mi)
  - Rank: 18th

Population (2024)
  - Total: ▲1,062,914
  - Rank: 7th
  - Density: 198/km^{2} (510/sq mi)
  - Rank: 5th
- Time zone: UTC+07:00 (ICT)
- Dialing code: +855
- ISO 3166 code: KH-3

Kampong Cham Province (Khmer: ខេត្តកំពង់ចាម, Khaet Kǎmpǒng Cham, [kɑm.pɔŋ caːm]; lit. 'Cham port') is a province of Cambodia located on the central lowlands of the Mekong River. It borders the provinces of Kampong Chhnang to the west, Kampong Thom and Kratié to the north, Tboung Khmum to the east, and Prey Veng and Kandal to the south. Kampong Cham was officially divided into two provinces on 31 December 2013 in what was seen by many as a political move by the ruling party. All land west of the Mekong remained Kampong Cham while land east of the river became Tbong Khmum province. Prior to this division, Kampong Cham extended eastward to the international border with Vietnam, was the eleventh largest province in Cambodia, and with a population of 1,680,694, was the most populous province in Cambodia. Its capital and largest city is Kampong Cham.

== Etymology ==
Kampong Cham is composed of the Khmer terms kǎmpǒng (កំពង់, lit. 'port') and Cham (ចាម, lit. 'Cham'), altogether meaning 'Port of Chams' referring to the ethnic minority of the Champa people who settled along the Mekong River after the fall of Champa. Archaeologists have cross referenced ancient inscriptions in this area with ones in Champa determining that Khmer and Cham royalty had political marriages in this area making it a vital buffer and diplomatic zone historically which may have influenced its etymology. A less popular claim is that Kampong Cham is a corrupted version of Kǎmpǒng Rǒng Cham which means 'Port of Waiting' based on other ancient inscriptions in the area, but scholars have yet to confirm a correlation with that term to today's Kampong Cham.

== Geography ==
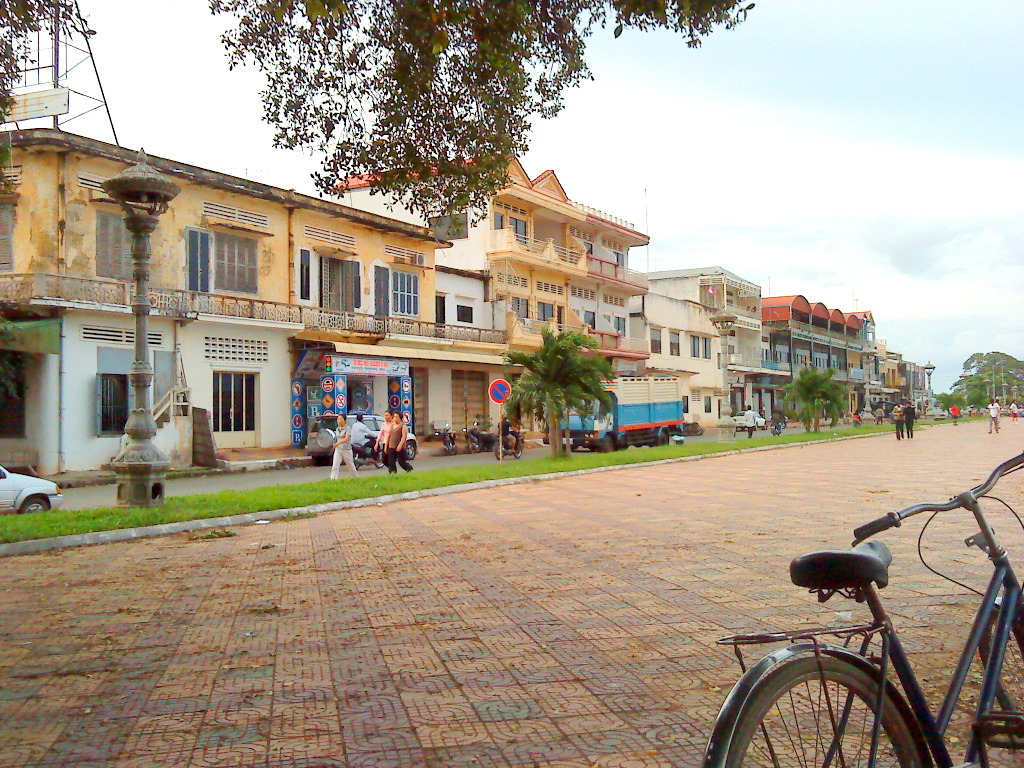
Houses on the border of the Mekong river.

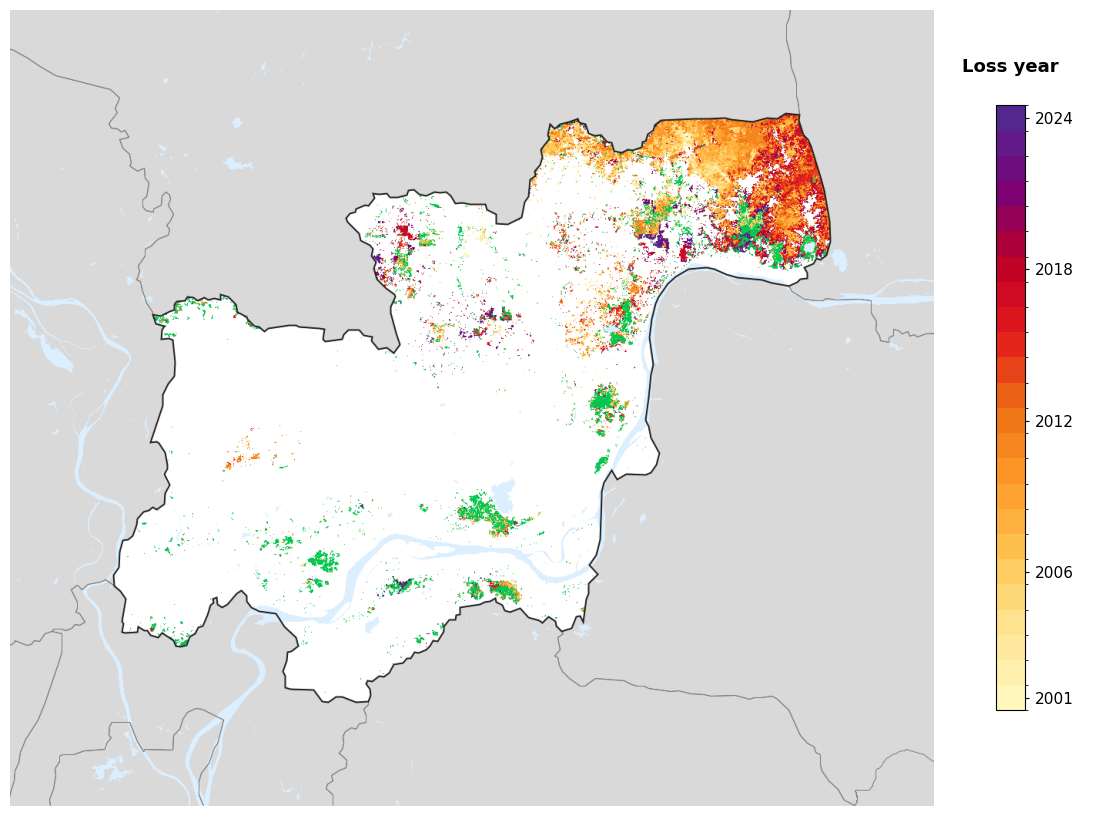
Tree-cover loss year in Kampong Cham, 2001-2024, from the Global Forest Change dataset.

Kampong Cham is primarily lowlands. The main river is the Mekong River, which forms the eastern border of the province, separating it from Tbong Khmum province.

== Religion ==
Religion in Kampong Cham province (2019 census)
1. Buddhism (97.6%)
2. Islam (2.30%)
3. Christianity (0.10%)
4. Animism and Other religions (0.00%)

The state religion is Theravada Buddhism. More than 97.6% of the people in Kampong Cham province are Buddhists. About 2.3% population of Kampong Cham province follow Islam followed by Chams. Christianity is followed by 0.1% in the province.

== Administration ==
Kampong Cham is subdivided into 9 districts and 1 municipality which in turn are subdivided into communes (khum) which are further divided into villages (phum). The province formerly consisted of 16 districts, however a request by Hun Sen's government to split the province in two was made after his ruling Cambodian People's Party (CPP) lost the province to the opposition in the July 2013 elections. The CPP won only eight of the available 18 National Assembly seats in Hun Sen's home province. The request, which was ostensibly made in order to improve administrative efficiency in the large province, was approved by King Sihamoni on 31 December 2013. The 10 districts that remain in Kampong Cham province overwhelmingly voted for the opposition Cambodia National Rescue Party, led by Sam Rainsy, while five of the six districts cut out from Kampong Cham to form Tboung Khmum province were won solidly by the CPP.

| ISO code | Name | Khmer | Population (2019) | Subdivisions |
|---|---|---|---|---|
— Municipality —
| 03-05 | Kampong Cham | កំពង់ចាម | 38,365 | 4 sangkat |
— District —
| 03-01 | Batheay | បាធាយ | 106,997 | 12 khum |
| 03-02 | Chamkar Loeu | ចំការលើ | 101,675 | 8 khum |
| 03-03 | Cheung Prey | ជើងព្រៃ | 92,898 | 10 khum |
| 03-06 | Kampong Siem | កំពង់សៀម | 94,729 | 15 khum |
| 03-07 | Kang Meas | កងមាស | 85,488 | 11 khum |
| 03-08 | Koh Sotin | កោះសូទិន | 48,069 | 8 khum |
| 03-13 | Prey Chhor | ព្រៃឈរ | 133,712 | 15 khum |
| 03-14 | Srey Santhor | ស្រីសន្ធរ | 81,687 | 14 khum |
| 03-15 | Steung Trang | ស្ទឹងត្រង់ | 103,501 | 12 khum |

While Kampong Cham Province lies primarily to the north of the Mekong River, Koh Sotin and Steung Trang Districts lie on the south banks.

== Politics ==
Kampong Cham is allocated 10 seats in the National Assembly, down from 18. It had been the largest constituency until 2018.

== Notable people ==
- Bun Rany, President of Cambodian Red Cross
- Hang Thun Hak, former Prime Minister
- Hem Heng, diplomat
- Heng Samrin, Speaker of the National Assembly
- Hun Manet, son of Hun Sen and current Prime Minister
- Hun Neang, father of Hun Sen
- Hun Sen, former Prime Minister
- In Tam, former Prime Minister
- Keng Vannsak, author
- Kong Korm, Senator
- Say Chhum, President of the Senate
- Sim Var, former Prime Minister

== See also ==
- Wat Moha Leap
- Khmer people
- Cham people
- Champa
- Kampong Cham (city), the capital city of Kampong Cham province.
