= Krouch Chhmar District =

Krouch Chhmar ស្រុកក្រូចឆ្មារ
- District (srok)
- Location in Cambodia
- Coordinates: 12°16′42″N 105°38′35″E
- Country: Cambodia
- Province: Tboung Khmum
- Communes: 14
- Villages: 76

Population (2019)
  - Total: 85,187
- Time zone: +7
- Geocode: 2504

Krouch Chhmar District (Khmer: ស្រុកក្រូចឆ្មារ, lit. 'The Lemon') is a district (srok) located in Tboung Khmum Province, Cambodia. The district capital is Krouch Chhmar town located around 35 kilometres north east of the provincial capital of Kampong Cham by water. The Mekong River forms western and northern borders of the districts and includes the Mekong island of Koh Pir in its area. Not surprisingly, communities in this isolated district are mostly clustered along the banks of the river and boats are an important form of transport.

The district is easily accessed by boat from neighboring Kampong Cham Province. Road access however, is more problematic. The district can only be accessed by vehicles via Chhloung town, Chhloung District in Kratie Province. The main road from the district capital of Krouch Chhmar runs along the Mekong for around 35 kilometres of secondary road to an intersection with National road 73 at Chhloung. From here it is around 18 kilometres north to Kratie or 30 kilometres south to the intersection with National Highway 7. From this intersection in Dambae District is it a further 34 kilometres west to the town of Kampong Cham.

== First Lady ==
Krouch Chhmar district is also the birthplace of Cambodia's first lady, Bun Rany the wife of Prime Minister Hun Sen. Bun Rany was born in 1954 in Roka Khnaor, Krouch Chhmar district, the fourth of five children from a farming family. Bun Rany joined the Khmer Rouge in 1970, after the coup by Lon Nol and received medical training. In 1975, when Phnom Penh fell to the communists she was the director of Krouch Chhmar district hospital, deep in the "liberated zone" (the zone controlled by the Khmer Rouge).

== Location ==
Krouch Chhmar district is in north-western Tboung Khmum Province. The Mekong runs along the western and northern borders of the district and the district boundary includes the river itself to midstream. Reading from the north clockwise, Krouch Chhmar shares a border with Stueng Trang district of Kampong Cham and Chhloung district of Kratie Province the Kratie district of Preaek Prasab to the north east. Dambae district forms most of the eastern border. To the south is Tboung Khmom district and the Kampong Cham district of Kampong Siem lies across the river to the west.

== Administration ==
Formerly part of Kampong Cham Province, Krouch Chhmar is one of six districts split off to form the new province of Tboung Khmum on 31 December 2013. The Krouch Chhmar district governor reports to the Governor of Kampong Cham. The following table shows the villages of Krouch Chhmar district by commune.

| Khum (Commune) | Phum (Village) |
|---|---|
| Chhuk | Chhuk, Phka Doung, Krabei Kreak, Chravak Daek, Baray, Ruom Vinh, Srah, Bos Svay |
| Chumnik | Preaek Ta Hok, Chumnik, Svay Damnak |
| Kampong Treas | Phum Muoy(1), Phum Pir(2), Phum Bei(3), Phum Buon(4), Phum Pram(5), Phum Prammuoy(6) |
| Kaoh Pir | Beipey, Kaoh Traeng, Kaoh Meun Nong, Chuor Kandal |
| Krouch Chhmar | Samraong, Daeum Chrey, Krouch Chhmar Leu, Krouch Chhmar Kraom, Khsach Prachheh Leu, Khsach Prachheh Kandal, Khsach Prachheh Kraom |
| Peus Muoy | Saoy Muoy, Saoy Pir, Preaek Krouch, Ampil, Kaoh Phal |
| Peus Pir | Ampil, Poes, Dei Doh, Tuol Sambatt |
| Preaek a Chi | Phum Ti Muoy(1st), Phum Ti Pir(2nd), Phum Ti Bei(3rd), Phum Ti Buon(4th), Phum Ti Pram(5th), Phum Ti Prammuoy(6th) |
| Roka Khnor | Phum Ti Muoy, Phum Ti Pir, Phum Ti Bei, Phum Ti Buon, Phum Ti Pram, Phum Ti Prammuoy, Phum Ti Prampir(7th) |
| Svay Khleang | Phum Ti Muoy, Phum Ti Pir, Phum Ti Bei, Phum Ti Buon, Phum Ti Pram, Phum Ti Prammuoy |
| Trea | Kdol Leu, Kdol Kandal, Ti Muoy, Ti Pir, Ti Bei, Ti Buon, Ti Pram, Kdol Kraom |
| Tuol Snuol | Tuol Ok, Mukh Phnum, Tuol Roka, Ta Kao, Tuol Snuol, Tuol Trach, Sangkom Mean Chey, Cheung Chrang, Ta Pav, Thnal Bei Maetr, Chamraeun, Phop Thmei |

== Demographics ==
The district is subdivided into 12 communes (khum) and 76 villages (phum). According to the 1998 Census, the population of the district was 99,695 persons in 18,982 households in 1998. With a population of almost 100,000 people, Krouch Chhmar district has one of the larger populations for districts in Tboung Khmum Province. The average household size in Krouch Chhmar is 5.2 persons per household, which is the same as the rural average for Cambodia (5.2 persons). The sex ratio in the district is 93.3%, with significantly more females than males.
