= Steung Trang district =

Steung Trang ស្រុកស្ទឹងត្រង់
- District (srok)
- Location in Cambodia
- Coordinates: 12°15′26″N 105°32′10″E
- Country: Cambodia
- Province: Kampong Cham
- Communes: 12
- Villages: 96

Population (1998)
  - Total: 107,425
- Time zone: +7
- Geocode: 0315

Steung Trang district (Khmer: ស្រុកស្ទឹងត្រង់, lit. 'The Straight River') is a district (srok) located in Kampong Cham province, Cambodia. The district capital is Steung Trang town located around 30 kilometres directly north of the provincial capital of Kampong Cham by road. Steung Trang is a large border district in the north of the province located on the Mekong River. The district lies on the border between Kampong Cham, Kampong Thom, Kratie and Tbong Khmum provinces. It is the birthplace of two Cambodian Prime Ministers: Hang Thun Hak (1972–1973) and Hun Sen (1985–2023).

The district is easily accessed by road or river from Kampong Cham city. The Beung Ket Rubber plantation covers much of the northern part of the district and a long stretch of the Mekong River is part of the district to midstream. Steung Trang town lies on National Road 222 which runs from Kampong Cham city to Chamkar Leu town.

== Location ==
Steung Trang district is a north east district of Kampong Cham Province and shares a border with three other provinces. Reading from the north clockwise, Steung Trang shares a border with Santuk district of Kampong Thom to the north. The eastern border of the district is shared with Chhloung district of Kratie. The Mekong river itself forms the southern border of the district to midstream and Krouch Chhmar of Tbong Khmum Province lie across the river. To the south is Kampong Siem district and Chamkar Leu district is on the southern. Baray district of Kampong Thom province forms the north western border.

== Administration ==
The Steung Trang district governor reports to Hun Neng, the Governor of Kampong Cham. The following table shows the villages of Steung Trang district by commune.

Khum (Commune)	Phum (villages)
Areaks Tnaot	Areaks Tnaot, Lvea, Kilou Prampir, Kilou Dab, Beak Anlung
Dang Kdar	Santich Kaeut, Santich Lech, Santich Kandal, Chrey Hay, Srae Rumduol, Ta Ream, Sdau, Ou Pir, Thmey, Hungbromar
Khpob Ta Nguon	Ou Run, Anlong Samlei, Preaek Tok, Khpob Ta Nguon, Chheu Teu, Veal Bampong
Me Sar Chrey	Ou Leu, Kbal Ou, Bos Pou, Ou Beng, Trapeang Chhuk
Ou Mlu	Khtuoy Muoy, Khtuoy Pir, Khtuoy Bei, Khtuoy Buon, Stang Sakha, Ou Pralaoh, Ou Kab Moan, Ou Ruessei, Ou Ta Sek, Samraong, Pratong, Bet Thnu, Spongsakachas
Peam Kaoh Sna	Peam Krau, Peam Knong, Dei Leu, Tuol Roka, Dei Doh, Preaek Sangkae Kaeut, Preaek Sangkae Lech, Kaoh Kandal, Srae Sangkae
Preah Andoung	Preaek Sdei, Preah Andoung Muoy, Preah Andoung Pir
Preaek Bak	Preaek Bak, Preaek Kak, Preaek Roluos, Preaek Preah Angk
Preaek Kak	Andoung Pech, Meakh Muoy, Meakh Pir, Tnaot Ta Say, Boeng Kachout, Ou Prampir, Tuol Pou, Preah, Phnum Montir, Preaek Barang, Boeng Daeng, Phnum Ampil, Boeng Ket Leu, Boeng Ket Kraom, Phum Haprammuoy, Chek Chvea, Ou Chek, Phum Kilou Bei, Phum sampram, Phum Chetseb, Ou Pram, Meakh Bei, Andoung Svay
Soupheas	Soupheas, Angkaol, Srab, Paprak, Sambour, Dei Kraham, Pumtuob
Tuol Preah Khleang	Thum, Thmei, Ta Meung, Voat, Doun Tor, Sampiengkrom, Sam Piengleu
Tuol Sambuor	Tuol Sambuor, Poun, Srae Ampov, Veal Preah

== Demographics ==
The district is subdivided into 12 communes (khum) and 96 villages (phum). According to the 1998 Census, the population of the district was 107,425 persons in 20,996 households in 1998. With a population of over 100,000 people, Steung Trang has one of the largest district populations in Kampong Cham province. The average household size in Steung Trang is 5.1 persons per household, which is slightly lower than the rural average for Cambodia (5.2 persons). The sex ratio in the district is 96.7%, with slightly more females than males.

== Hun Sen ==
Cambodia's Prime Minister, Samdech Hun Sen was born in Peam Kaoh Sna commune, Steung Trang district on Tuesday, August 5, 1952. He is one of the key leaders of the Cambodian People's Party (CPP), which has governed Cambodia since the Vietnamese-backed overthrow of the Khmer Rouge in 1979. He was a Khmer Rouge commander who escaped to Vietnam before 1979. He has a glass eye, the result of a wound sustained in fighting near Kampong Cham city in Tboung Khmom district during the Khmer Rouge offensive against major cities in April 1975.
