= Memot District =

Memot District ស្រុកមេមត់
- District (srok)
- Location in Cambodia
- Coordinates: 11°49′37″N 106°10′58″E
- Country: Cambodia
- Province: Tboung Khmum
- Communes: 14
- Villages: 175

Population (2019) http://nis.gov.kh/nis/Census2019/Final%20General%20Population%20Census%202019-English.pdf
  - Total: 152,082
- Time zone: UTC+7 (ICT)
- Geocode: 2510

Memot District (Khmer: ស្រុកមេមត់, lit. 'The Memot's Animism') is a district (srok) in Tboung Khmum Province, Cambodia. The district capital is Memot town, around 80 kilometres (50 mi) east of the provincial capital of Kampong Cham by road. Memot is a border district and the city of Tây Ninh in Vietnam is 80 kilometres (50 mi) away by road.

The district is easily accessed by road from Kampong Cham or Kratié. Though there are numerous smaller roads within the district that cross the border into Vietnam, there is no official international border crossing within the district. The closest official crossing is 44 kilometres (27 mi) southeast of the district capital at Trapeang Phlong in Ponhea Kraek District. Memot town lies on National Highway 7 near the midpoint between Kampong Cham and Kratié. It is the birthplace of prime minister Hun Manet.

== Location ==
Memot district is the most easterly district in Tboung Khmum Province and shares a border with Vietnam. Reading from the north clockwise, Memot shares a border with Preaek Prasab and Snuol districts of Kratié Province to the north. The eastern border of the district is shared with the Vietnamese Province of Bình Phước, while Tây Ninh Province of Vietnam is to the south. The western border of the district abuts Ponhea Kraek and Dambae districts of Tboung Khmum province.

== Prehistoric civilisation ==
Memot has given its name to a prehistoric culture that lived in the area some 2500 years ago. The Memotian culture is the name given to a series of archaeological sites found in Memot and across the border in Vietnam. The district is home to a number of prehistoric sites which have only recently been studied. In 1959, French archaeologist Louis Malleret first described a series of 17 circular earthworks, each with an outer wall and an inner ditch. He reported this new category of prehistoric sites in the red soil region east of the Mekong in what was then part of Kampong Cham Province and in Vietnam. In 1962, Bernard Philippe Groslier carried out excavations in a circular earthwork near Memot, later called the Groslier site, and named this civilisation "Mimotien". The Memot Circular Earthworks span across the red soil region of eastern Cambodia and the border of Vietnam. To date 36 of these massive prehistoric villages have been discovered in Cambodia. Radiocarbon dating of fragments of glass bangles found at one site gives evidence for a first millennium B.C. date. In 2010 another site, "Samrong Circular Earthwork", was unintentionally destroyed by bulldozers to make way for low-cost housing.

== Administration ==
The following table shows the villages of Memot districts by commune.

Khum (Commune)	Phum (Villages)
Chan Mul	Srae Ta Nong Lech, Srae Ta Nong Kaeut, Thlok, S'am, Chan Mul, Ta Kaev, Peam, Kor, Kalou, Kantraeuy, Khlong Tboung, Ampol
Choam	Ngiev, Leach Kraom, Leach Leu, Boeng Chroung, Choam Ampil, Choam, Cheung, Mong, Poploam, Stueng Angkam
Choam Kravien	Kravien Thom, Kravien Cheung, Daung, Satum, Thma Ta Daok, Kbal Slaeng, Khmaoh, Mroan, Thma Da, Danghet, Khmuor, Prei, Banghaeur Huos, Robang Chroh, Chi Plok, Chrey Laeung, Khcheay
Choam Ta Mau	Ta Mau Khang Cheung, Choam Ta Mau, Chumnum Pol, Sampov Lun, Tuol Kruos, Thnal Kaeng, Angkam, Kantuot, Thma Totueng, Srae Ta Pich, Koun Krapeu, Bos Ta Oem, Thmei, Lam Baor
Dar	Dar Kandaol, Dar Lech, Prampir Meakkakra, Spean, Dar Phsar, Srae Choam, Meaek Puk, Dar Tboung, Dar Kandal, Triek, Chhngar Cheung, Samraong Cheung, Dar Cheung, Beng, Chamkar Kor, Chhngar Kandal, Salang Ti Mouy, Salang Ti Pir, Kang Keng
Kampoan	Lour, Kampoan, Tuek Tum, Srae Saom Thmei, Srae Saom Chas, Srae Kandal, Chhloung Muoy, Chhloung Pir, Chhloung Bei
Memong	Memong, Sangkae Chas, Sangkae Thmei, Peuk, Choam Khyang, Triek, Kabbas, Cheach, Sambour
Memot	Trapeang Reang, Mukh Kras, Chhngar Sala, Chi Peh, Sangkom Mean Chey Thmei, Choam M'aor, Nang Krapeu, Memot Kandal, Masin Tuek, Tboung Voat, Memot Phsar, Trabaek, Sangkom Mean Chey, Chhngar Kaeut, Memot Thmei
Rung	Rung, Trapeang Ruessei, Beng, Choam Tuk, Taonh, Andoung Ta Chou, Masin, Bos, Doung, Soutey, Doun Rodth Ti Muoy, Chambak, Doun Rodth Ti Pir
Rumchek	Rumchek, Chheu Khloem, Khpob, Thma Dab, Kampey, Phnov, Srae Pongro, Khliech, Kantuot
Tramung	Ou Khlout, Tramaeng Leu, Tramung, Choam Triek, Andoung Thma Leu, Andoung Thma Kraom, Roung Chakr Skar, Tramaeng Kraom, Doung, Choam Trav, Chhuk, Ngeu Thmei, Ngeu Thum, Trapeang Ngeu, Chrey, Roung Chakr Lech, Roung Chakr Kaeut, Doung, Sambour, Krouch
Tonlung	Kdol Leu, Kdol Kraom, Kdol Phsar, Changkum Ti Muoy, Changkum Kandal, Spean Changkum, Kaoh Thma, Sla Phnum, Mkaor, Beng Kaong, Pong Tuek, Lvea Leu
Triek	Dak Por, Bangkov, Prei, Khley, Romeas Choul, Preah Ponlea, Samraong Tboung
Kokir	Preaek Puoy, Kngaok, Srae Poul, Tuol Thma, Kokir Cheung, Kokir Tboung, Salang Bei, Chamkar Thmey

== Demographics ==
The district is divided into 14 communes (khum) and 175 villages (phum). According to the 1998 Census, the population of the district was 111,296 people in 21,775 households in 1998. With a population of over 110,000 people, Memot district had the third largest population in Tboung Khmum province after Ponhea Kraek and Tboung Khmom. The average household size in Memot is 5.1 persons per household, which is slightly lower than the rural average for Cambodia (5.2 persons). The sex ratio in the district is 94.5%, with significantly more females than males.
