= Hun Neang =

Father of Hun Sen (1923–2013)

Neak Oknha Moha Pheakdey Saburisak Phoukea Thipadei Hun Neang KNM
- ហ៊ុន នាង
- Born: 27 August 1924; Kampong Cham, Cambodia, French Indochina
- Died: 12 July 2013 (aged 88); Phnom Penh, Cambodia
- Resting place: Wat Vongkut Borei, Khan Sen Sok, Phnom Penh
- Known for: Father of Hun Sen
- Spouse: Dy Pok
- Children: 6, including Hun Sen

Hun Neang (Khmer: ហ៊ុន នាង, Chinese: 云良; 27 August 1924 – 12 July 2013) was a Cambodian Buddhist monk. He is the father of Senate President Hun Sen and the grandfather of Prime Minister Hun Manet. A devout Buddhist, various schools throughout the country are named in honour after him. Hun Neang's official, full title is "Neak Oknha Moha Pheakdey Saburisak Phoukea Thipadei", which was presented to him by King Norodom Sihamoni in 2011.

== Biography ==
Hun Neang was born on 27 August 1924, at the district of Stung Trang in Kampong Cham province. He was a resident monk in a local Wat in Kampong Cham province before defrocking himself to join the French resistance and married Hun Sen's mother, Dy Pok in the 1940s. Hun Neang's paternal grandparents were wealthy landowners of Teochew Chinese heritage. Hun Neang inherited some of his family assets and led a relatively comfortable life, as they owned several hectares of land until a kidnapping incident forced their family to sell off much of their assets. His wife Dy Pok died in 1998 of illness at the age of 81.

Hun Neang and Dy Pok had six children, of which Prime Minister Hun Sen is the third child. He also had 30 grandchildren and 66 great grandchildren.

== Death and funeral ==
Hun Neang battled health issues in March 2012, according to his son, Hun Sen. He died on Friday, 12 July 2013, aged 88.

His funeral was held at Hun Sen's residence near the Independence Monument. Government officials and foreign leaders attended the funeral and sent their condolences to Hun Sen, including Vietnamese Prime Minister Nguyen Tan Dung, Thai former Prime Minister Thaksin Shinawatra, and Thai Prime Minister Yingluck Shinawatra. King Norodom Sihamoni and Queen-Mother Norodom Monineath were also present. He was interred near his wife's crypt in Vongkut Borei Pagoda in Toek Thla commune, Sen Sok district.

== Personal life ==
Hun Neang was married to Dy Pok (1920–March 1998) in the 1940s. They had six children. Other sources stated that the couple had seven children, one of whom died before Hun Sen was born.

- Eldest son: Neak Oknha Oudom Metreivisidh Hun San (b. Hun Long San, 6 July 1948–28 March 2025)
- Second son: Samdech Uddom Tep Nhean Hun Neng (b. Hun Long Seng, 2 April 1950–5 May 2022)
- Third son: Samdech Akka Moha Sena Padei Techo Hun Sen
- Eldest daughter: Hun Sengny
- Second daughter: Oknha Hun Sinat
- Third daughter: Hun Bunthoeun (Hun Thoeun)
