= Memot Circular Earthworks =

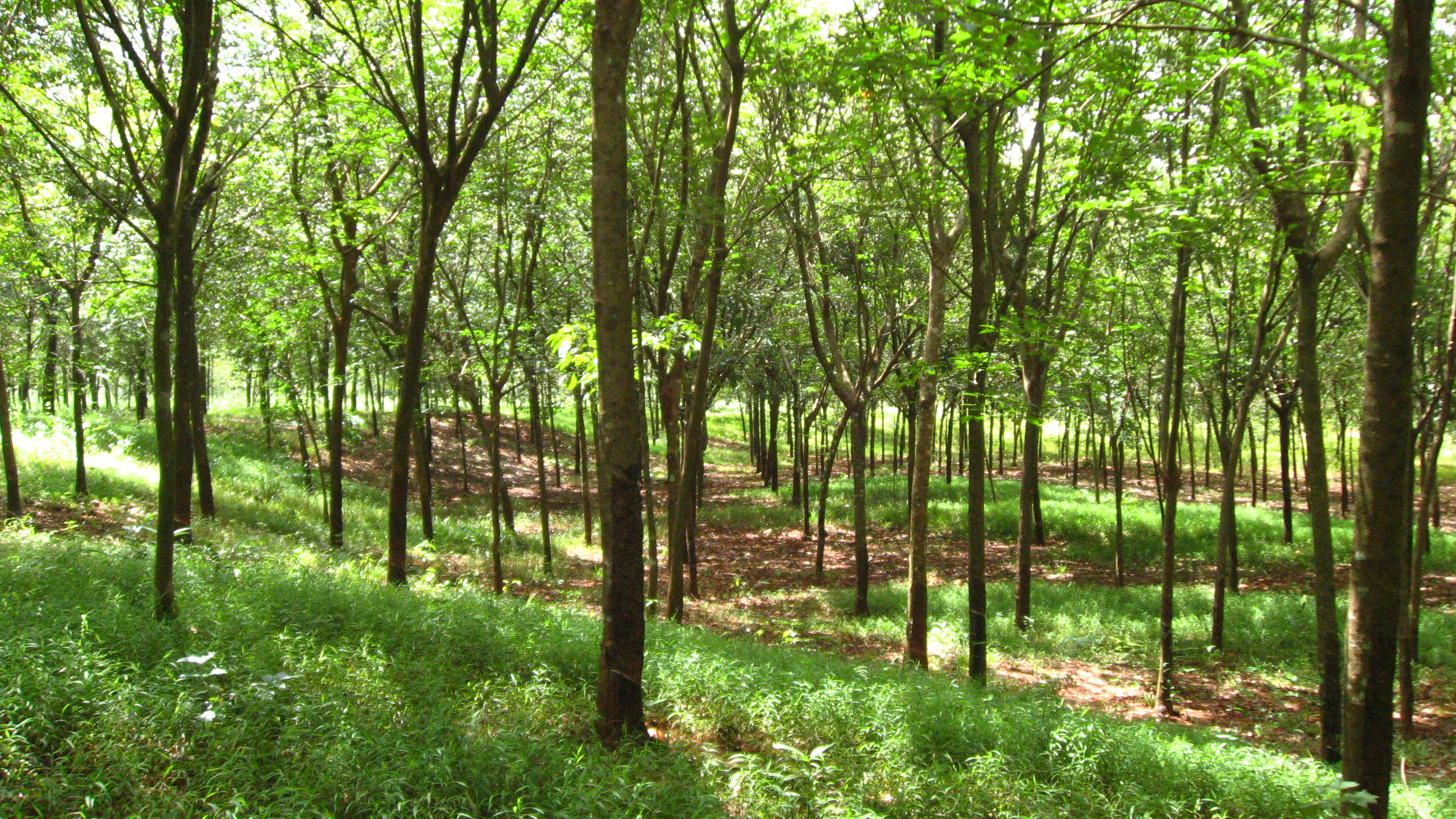
Memot earthwork covered by rubber trees. The elevated portion of the earthwork is in the lower left hand corner and shows a gentle slope towards the center

The sites of the Memot Circular Earthworks are located mostly in discrete eastern Cambodia and border of Vietnam in spaces between lowlands and uplands through the Mekong delta. Each earthwork is a set of two circular embankments that surround an inner platform that is slightly curved. These sites have been studied systematically starting in the 1960s. Each site is unique to the archeological artifacts found there, and studies show that these sites were inhabited over thousands of years. The current landscape of the region may contribute to the underrepresentation of these earthworks in the field of archeology, as the majority of these sites are located in modern rubber tree plantations. Many of the Neolithic period and other prehistoric sites have yet to be studied, however, as political unrest in Cambodia has contributed to inconsistencies in archeological fieldwork.

== Features ==
When identifying circular earthworks in the red soil region, similar features are noted. Many circular earthworks consist of two circular moats around a slightly curved, inner platform. One larger embankment encircles a second embankment, with a slightly curved platform in the middle. In eastern Cambodia, some sites have even been recorded as exceeding 4.5 hectares.

== History ==
=== Excavation history ===
Circular earthworks in the red soil region were identified by Louis Malleret in 1959. He recorded 17 earthworks from aerial photography along the Cambodia-Vietnam border. Malleret believed these sites to be from the Neolithic period, though this was based on preliminary analysis rather than archeological excavations. This culture received its name in 1962 by Bernard Philippe Groslier, who excavated a site, ultimately developing the name "Memotien" as a result of its proximity to the Memot District in Cambodia. Unfortunately, Groslier did not record or disclose the exact location of said excavations. Geologist J.P. Carbonnel confirmed sites identified by Mallaret in 1970, including those at Memot and Krek. In 1981, Ngyuen Trung Do and Ngyuen Long from the Institute of Social Sciences in Ho Chi Minh City continued excavating one of the sites previously identified by Mallaret. Further excavations into the circular earthworks at Krek took place from 1996 to 2001, by students from the Royal University of Fine Arts in Phnom Penh, Cambodia.

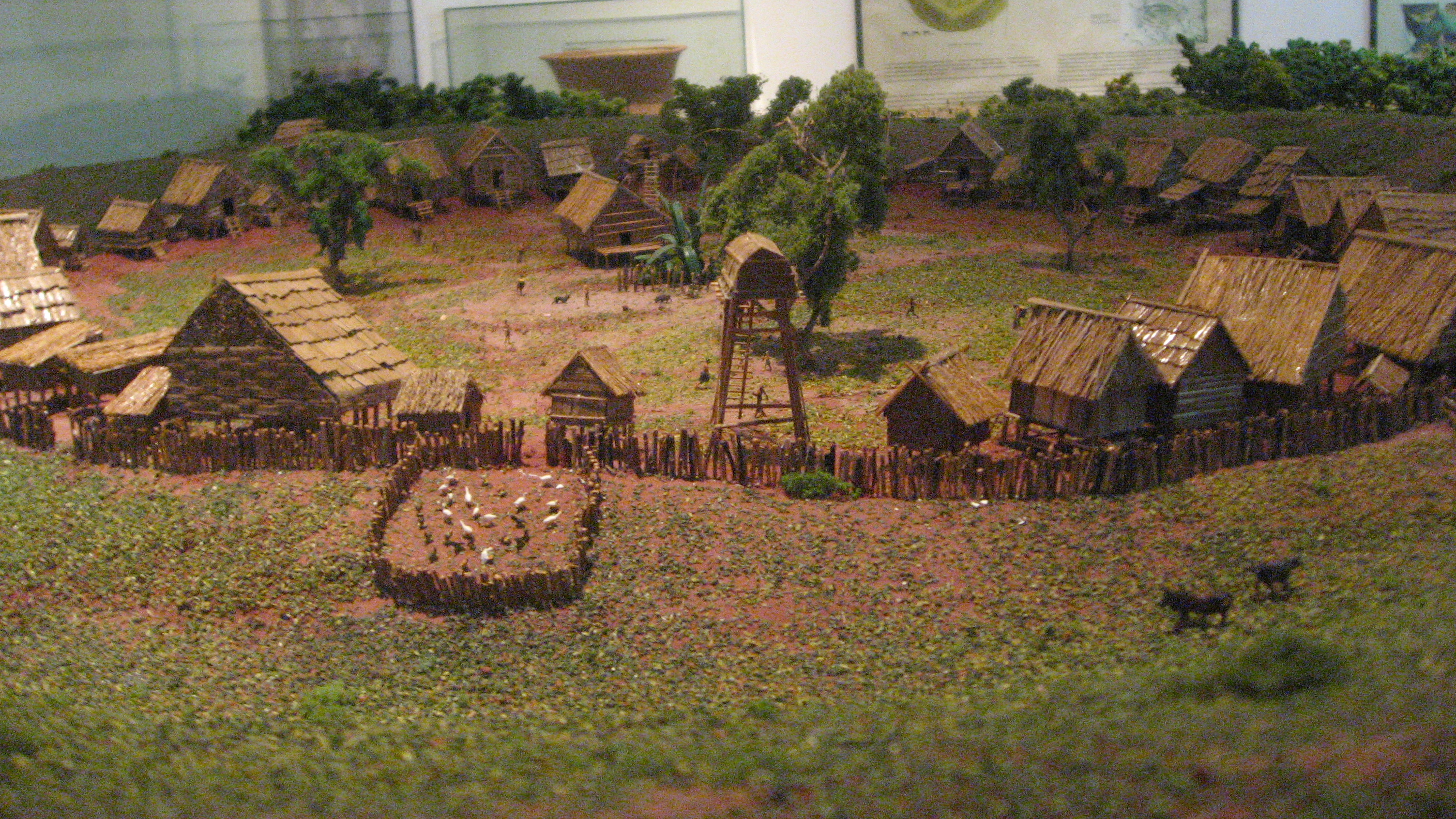
An example of what a possible community layout looked like on these earthworks, on display at the Memot Centre for Archaeology.

== Archeological findings ==
The acidity of the red soil region makes the discovery of some artifacts difficult, as organic materials are unlikely to preserve in acidic environments. Preserved artifacts in the archeological record suggest that the interior platforms were likely to be the most densely inhabited. Approximate dates for habitation are 2300-3000 BCE. The limited amounts of artifacts leads investigators to surmise the size of the population as not exceeding 100 people.

=== Subsistence patterns ===
There is evidence of horticulture and agricultural practices being utilized by the community, seen through evidence of stone tools like adzes. The presence of adzes and axes suggest woodworking and plot-clearing took place at these sites. Within each circular moat, there is evidence of rice cultivation as well as other artifacts like glass, showing a developed rice-based subsistence culture. The environmental impact of the local population appears to be little to none, likely due to their relatively small numbers.

=== Lithics ===
A variety of lithic artifacts have been discovered at these sites. This includes but is not limited to adzes, axes, grinding stones, and debitage. Evidence from artifact assemblages suggest that lithic tools were being produced locally. In 1962, 1966, and 1970, Groslier excavated the inner platform of a site, identifying artifacts including lithics. When excavating an earthwork near Loc-Ninh, Ngyuen Trung Do and Ngyuen Long found lithics within the inner wall and platform.

=== Ceramics ===
Ceramics have also been found at Memotien Circular Earthworks. Previous ceramic materials excavated by Groslier are said to number around 20,000. Ceramics were likely being locally produced, as evidenced by artifact assemblages and the availability of materials to do so. Organic materials such as grain and rice husks were also utilized in ceramics, as the temper used in some pottery contain these remains.
