= Dambae District =

Dambae តំបែរ
- District
- Dambae District ស្រុកតំបែរ
- Location in Cambodia
- Coordinates: 11°54′40″N 105°51′15″E
- Country: Cambodia
- Province: Tboung Khmum

Population (1998)
  - Total: 51,650
- Time zone: UTC+7 (ICT)
- Geocode: 2504

Dambae (Khmer: តំបែរ, Tâmbêr [ɗɑmɓae], lit. 'The Wine Source') is a district (srok) of Tboung Khmum Province, Cambodia. The district capital is Dambae town. This small town is located just off National Road 73 about 11 kilometres from National Highway 7. Dambae is around 45 kilometres west of the provincial capital of Kampong Cham Province, Kampong Cham, and 47 kilometres south of the city of Kratié, the capital of Kratié Province.

Dambaer district is home to the Haung resort and waterfall, and a picnic and holiday spot. The falls are located in Srae Veng Village, Teuk Chrov Commune near the border with Memot district and about 90 kilometres from the provincial capital. Haung is set in mountain scenery including 1,800 hectares of natural forest. The waterfalls have worn out a 1,425 square metre stone crater below the cascade.

== Location ==
Dambae district is in north-central Tboung Khmum Province and borders on one other province. Reading from the north clockwise, Dambae shares a border with Preaek Prasab District of Kratie Province to the north and Memot District forms the eastern boundary. To the south of Dambae is Ponhea Kraek District. Dambae shares its western border with Tboung Kmum and Krouch Chhmar districts.

== Administration ==
Formerly part of the Kampong Cham Province, Dambae is one of six districts that were split off to form the new province of Tboung Khmum on 31 December 2013. The Dambae district governor reports to the governor of Tboung Khmum. The following table shows the villages of Dambae district by commune.

| Communes | Khmer | Villages |
|---|---|---|
| Chong Cheach | ចុងជាច | Kouk Sralau, Ta Ream, Ta Meakh Chas, Ta Meakh Thmei, Cheach Kaeut, Cheach Cheung, Cheach Thum, Trapeang Chrey, Koun Trom, Stueng Ta Thok, Char Thum, Svay Pak, Ponleak |
| Dambae | តំបែរ | Dambae, Chrey Phluk, Kakaoh, Trapeang Ruessei, Khcheay, Svay Popeah, Thnal, Chey Sambatt |
| Kouk Srok | គោកស្រុក | Sieng Khveang, Kouk Char, Trapeang Srangae, Kouk Srok, Chheu Teal Chrum, Trapeang Ruessei, Veal Andaeuk, Trapeang Chhuk, SomBor Meas |
| Neang Teut | នាងទើត | Khnor, Pongro, Chambak, Neang Teut, Sangkom |
| Seda | សេដា | Kampong Reang, Veal Touch, Svay Kambet, Krasang, Sampoar, Andoung Lngieng, Ta Kaev, Tuol Pras, Chi Theang, Chhung Ta Sau, Srerksach, Keangthmey, BreakChorChomren, Bengthmey, Sethasaenchey, Donghar, Hompark |
| Tuek Chrov | ទឹកជ្រៅ | Trabaek, Tuek Chrov, Me Sar, Khley, Ph'av, Srama, Choam Trakuon, Krasang, Srae Veaeng |
| Trapeang Pring | ត្រពាំងព្រីង | Banghaeur Khlaeng, Srae Kak, Chambak, Pralaoh, Trapeang Pring, Kampraeus, Srae Prang, Bos Khnor, Chi Trun, Tuol Sambour, Cheysoksan, Samakom 16, Senmonorom |

== Demographics ==
Dambae district is subdivided into 7 communes (khum) and 63 villages (phum). According to the 1998 Census, the population of the district was 51,650 persons in 9,738 households in 1998. With a population of over 50,000 people, Dambae is one of the least populated districts in Tboung Khmum province and has the lowest population density. The average household size in Dambae is 5.2 persons per household, slightly higher than the rural average for Cambodia (5.1). The sex ratio in the district is 95.5%, with more females than males.
