= Saob Leu =

Coordinates: 12°30′N 105°59′E

Saob Leu is a village in Saob Commune, Preaek Prasab District, Kratie Province, Cambodia.
