= Ang Choulean =

Cambodian anthropologist

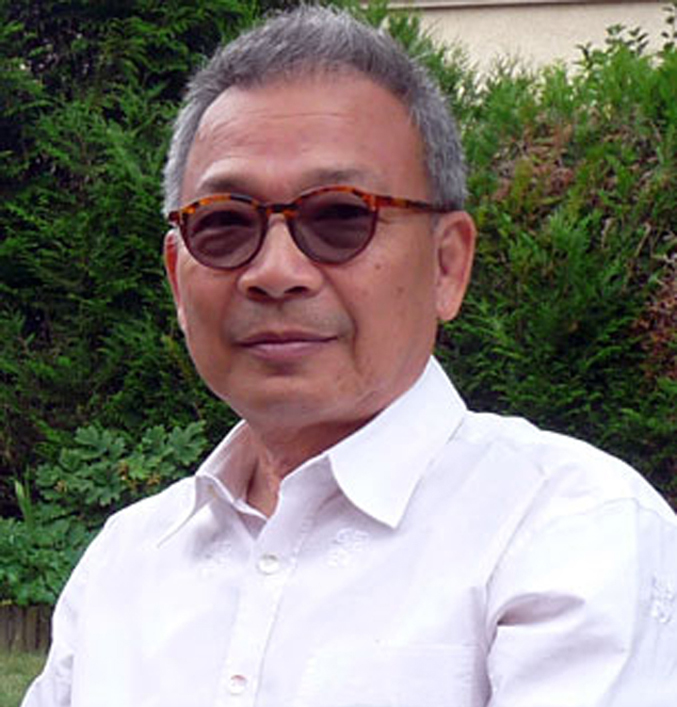
- Ang Choulean in 2016
- Born: January 1, 1949; Kampong Khleang Commune (Q56321668), Siem Reap
- Education: Royal University of Fine Arts, École des Roches
- Awards: Fukuoka Prize (2011)

Ang Choulean (Khmer: អាំង ជូលាន; born 1 January 1949) is a Cambodian anthropologist.

== Education ==
Ang Choulean earned a bachelor's degree in Archaeology in 1974 from the Royal University of Fine Arts and a PhD in Anthropology in 1982 from École des Roches in France.

== Career ==
Ang Choulean is a professor of historical anthropology at the Royal University of Fine Arts and the former director of the Department of Culture of APSARA.

== Awards ==
In 2011, Ang Choulean won the Grand Prize of Fukuoka Prize, the second Khmer person after Chheng Phon in 1997 to win the prize.

== Honours ==
- Order of the Rising Sun, 3rd Class, Gold Rays with Neck Ribbon (2022)
- Grand Order of National Merit (Cambodia) (2025)

== Bibliography ==
- អាហារនៅជនបទអង្គ័រ/Cuisine rurale d'Angkor: Essai de sociologie culinaire. Yosothor. 2020. ISBN 978-9-924-93940-5.
- Bayon: New Perspectives. River Books Press. 2007. ISBN 978-1-588-86040-8.
- Braḥ Liṅg. Reyum Institute of Arts and Culture. 2005. ISBN 978-1-588-86081-1.
- People and Earth. Art Media Resources. 2002. ISBN 978-1-588-86040-8.
