= Peam Kaoh Sna =

- Commune
- Location within Cambodia
- Coordinates: 12°17′59″N 105°40′7″E
- Country: Cambodia
- Province: Kampong Cham
- District: Steung Trang

Population (2019)
  - Total: 8,290
- Time zone: UTC+7

Peam Kaoh Sna is a khum (commune) of Steung Trang District in Kampong Cham Province, Cambodia.

It is the birthplace of Cambodia's President of the Senate and former Prime Minister, Hun Sen.

== Villages ==
- Peam Krau
- Peam Knong
- Dei Leu
- Tuol Roka
- Dei Doh
- Preaek Sangkae Kaeut
- Preaek Sangkae Lech
- Kaoh Kandal
- Srae Sangkae
