= Grand Order of National Merit =

Cambodian national award

Grand Order of National Merit គ្រឿងឥស្សរិយយសជាតូបការ
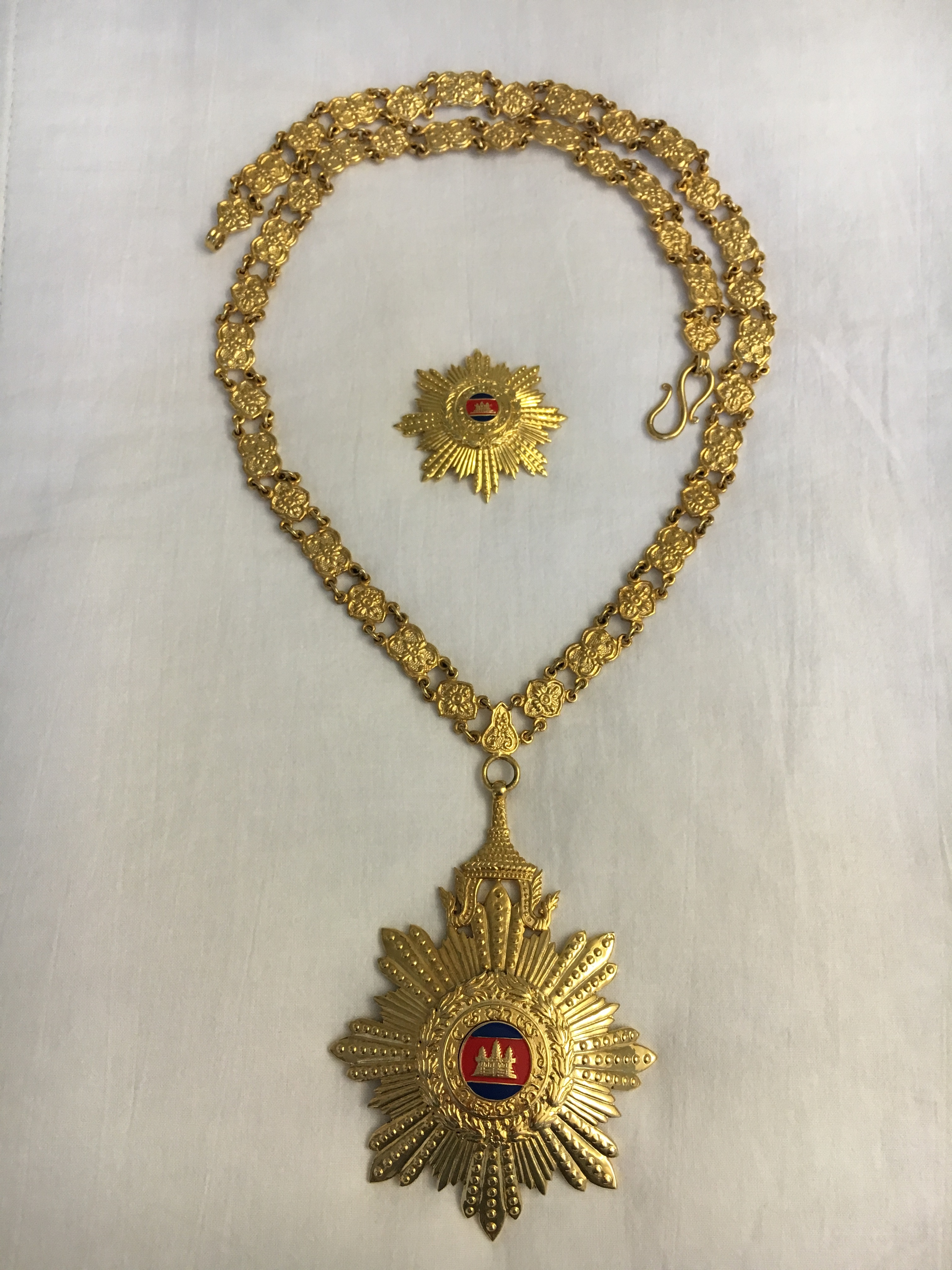
- Insignia of the Order, private collection.

Awarded by King of Cambodia
- Type: Order
- Established: 5 October 1995
- Eligibility: Foreign Head of State and Cambodian nationals who have performed exceptional services to the nation.
- Status: Currently constituted
- Sovereign: Norodom Sihamoni
- Grades: One

Statistics
- First induction: 1996
- Total inductees: 5

Precedence
- Next (higher): None (Highest)
- Next (lower): Royal Order of Cambodia
- Ribbon of the order

The Grand Order of National Merit (Khmer: គ្រឿងឥស្សរិយយសជាតូបការ, Krœăng Ĕssârĭyôyôs Chéatobâkar) was founded by King Norodom Sihanouk on 5 October 1995. It is awarded in one class to foreign Heads of State and to Cambodian nationals who have performed exceptional services to the nation.

== Recipients ==
- Ang Choulean (2025)
- Sok Tonh (2023)
- Chhin Seyha (2023)
- Kao Kim Hourn (2015)
- Chea Sim (2007)
- Bour Kry (2007)
- Norodom Ranariddh (2001)
- Hun Sen (1996)
