= Ponhea Kraek District =

Ponhea Kraek ស្រុកពញ្ញាក្រែក
- District (srok)
- Location in Cambodia
- Coordinates: 11°47′36″N 105°53′3″E
- Country: Cambodia
- Province: Tboung Khmum
- Communes: 8
- Villages: 152

Population (2019)
  - Total: 147,310
- Time zone: +7
- Geocode: 2512

Ponhea Kraek District (Khmer: ស្រុកពញ្ញាក្រែក, lit. 'The Great Krek's Rattan') is a district (srok) located in Tboung Khmum Province, Cambodia. The district capital is Ponhea Kraek town located around 48 kilometres east of the provincial capital of Kampong Cham by road. Ponhea Kraek is a border district and the city of Tây Ninh in Vietnam is around 57 kilometres away by road. The district also lies on the border between Tboung Khmum and Prey Veng Province.

The district is easily accessed by road from Kampong Cham city, Kratié or Tây Ninh. The Krek Rubber plantation covers much of the northern part of the district. There is an official international border crossing 13 kilometres south east of the district capital at Trapeang Phlong. Ponhea Kreak town lies on National Highway 7 between Tboung Khmum and Kratié.

== Location ==
Ponhea Kraek district is a southern district in Tboung Khmum Province and shares a border with both Vietnam and Prey Veng Province. Reading from the north clockwise, Ponhea Kraek shares a border with Dambae district to the north. The eastern border of the district is shared with Memot District of Tboung Khmum and the Vietnamese Province of Tây Ninh, which also wraps around to the southern district border. To the south are Kamchay Mear and Kanhchriech districts of Prey Veng. The western border of the district abuts Ou Reang Ov and Tboung Khmum districts of Tboung Khmum province.

== Cambodia's oldest man ==
Ponhea Kraek district was the home and birthplace of Sek Yi, reported to be the oldest ever Cambodian and one of the oldest people in the world. His grandson reported that he was born in 1883, in either January or February in a small village in the south-east province of what was then Kampong Cham. During two marriages, Sek Yi had twelve children who together produced 70 grandchildren, and an estimated 420 great-grandchildren. He outlived half of his 12 children, all of whom lived to 70 or 80. Sek Yi died in his home in Ponhea Kraek in October 2003, aged 120 years old.

== Administration ==
The Ponhea Kraek district governor reports to the Governor of Tboung Khmum. The following table shows the villages of Ponhea Kraek district by commune.

Khum (Commune)	Phum (Villages)
Dountei	Bos Roka, Prey Tumnob, Roul Ph'aem, Ta Ni, Spean Chrey, Svay Sokhom, Bos Ruessei, Samraong, Dountei, Pouthi Proeks Lech, Pouthi Proeks Kaeut, Sovann Mealea, Reul Leu, Reul Kraom, Sna Kandal, Chhuk Sa, Angkor Krau, Angkor Knong, Pou Thum, Kouk Neavea
Kak	Sambour, Kanhchae, Bos Ti, Ponley, Trapeang Stieng, Tuek Yong, Angkaeng, Ta Am, Santey Ti Pir, Samrouy, Trapeang Santey, Thlok Trach, Ruessei Chuor, Krouch, Ampil, Santey Ti Muoy, Krasaom Sat, Kokir, Anlong Chrey, Thlok, Stueng Touch, Orprech, dongkdoung
Kandaol Chrum	Kandaol Chrum, Bos Khnor, Monou Bu, Veal, Cheung ang, Doek Por, Pong Tuek, Chey Nikom, Ampuk, Andaot, Svay Meas, Trapeang Prei, Tuol Chamkar, Trapeang Tonsaong, Preah Andoung, Mkak, Tuol Pou, Tuol Chey, Sovann Kom, Kouk Lvieng, Sbaek Kueu, Bat Tonlea, Lheang, Sduksombath
Kaong Kang	Trapeang Khyang, Ta Hiev Leu, Ta Hiev Kraom, Kandaol Kaong, Stueng, Pou Roung Lech, Pou Roung Leu, Pou Ent Muoy, Pou Ent Pir, Kaong Kang Ti Muoy, Kaong Kang Ti Pir, Kaong Kang Ti Bei, Kantuot, La, Thnolthmey, Porsrok
Kraek	Kraek Tboung, Kraek Cheung, Chimoan Tboung, Chimoan Cheung, Chimoan Kandal, Chimoan Lech, Peuk, Huoch Lech, Huoch Kaeut, Prey Totueng, Tuol Angkrong, Neang Noy, Traset, Kov, L'ak, Kor, Apuk, Chi Peang, Bos Lvea, Sakmakom, Trapeang Sokha, Andoung Chey, Serei Sokha, Chi Tok, Memae, Srae Tuek, S'am, Roung Chakr, Sambour phal, Sokh Chamraeun, Phum Hapram, Phum Saepram, Phum Samprampir, Proeks
Popel	Popel, Tuol Kandal, Thmei, Trapeang Thma, khsak, Trapeang Chhleung, Srah, Choam Thlok, Stueng Cheung, Thulchan
Trapeang Phlong	Tuol Sangkae, Kbal Damrei, Trapeang Pring Muoy, Trapeang Pring Pir, Chrak Rumdeng, Serei Sokhom, Trapeang Rumsaeng, Preah Phdau, Bos Chek, Thnal Kaeng, Trach Khaol, Trapeang Phlong Pir, Trapeang Phlong Muoy, Thmei
Veal Mlu	Chrab, Sralau Chroeng, Veal Mlu, Dambang Ampeak, Kabbas, Kranhung

== Demographics ==
The district is subdivided into 8 communes (khum) and 152 villages (phum). According to the 1998 Census, the population of the district was 123,879 persons in 24,261 households in 1998. With a population of over 120,000 people, Ponhea Kraek district has one of the largest district populations in Tboung Khmum province after Tboung Khmum District. The average household size in Ponhea Kraek is 5.1 persons per household, which is slightly lower than the rural average for Cambodia (5.2 persons). The sex ratio in the district is 93.3%, with significantly more females than males.
