= Chhloung district =

Chhloung ឆ្លូង
- District
- Chhloung District ស្រុកឆ្លូង
- Country: Cambodia
- Province: Kratié

Population (1998)
  - Total: 50,407
- Time zone: UTC+7 (ICT)
- Geocode: 1001

Chhloung (Khmer: ឆ្លូង [cʰloːŋ]) is a district of Kratié Province, Cambodia.

== Communes and villages ==
Commune (Khum)	Villages (Phum)
Chhloung	Chhney, Chrouy Thma Kraom, Chrouy Thma Leu, Kampong Srae, Kandal, Kaoh Kandaor
Damrei Phong	Boeng Kieb, Bos, Krouch, Prey Kou, Prahuot, Pralay Triek, Srae Sdach, Srae Triek
Hanchey	Hanchey I, Hanchey II, Hanchey III, Hanchey IV
Kampong Damrei	Prama, Roliek, Veal Kansaeng
Kanhchor	Chheuteal Phluoh Leu, Chheuteal Phluoh Kraom, Kanhchor, Preaek Chamlak
Khsach Andaet	Preaek Samraong I, Preaek Samraong II, Preaek Ta Hub, Thmei I, Thmei II
Pongro	Dang Kdaong, Pongro I, Pongro II, Pongro III, Tnaot
Preaek Saman	Chheuteal Phluoh, Chhak Kantoung, Dei Thmei, Lvea Thum, Preaek Saman
