= Hun Sen =

Prime Minister of Cambodia (1985–1993; 1998–2023)

Samdech Akka Moha Sena Padei Techo (Note: Khmer: អគ្គមហាសេនាបតី តេជោ ហ៊ុន សែន [sɑmɗac ʔakkeaʔ mɔhaː senaː paɗəj tecoː hun saen]; meaning "Lord Prime Minister and Supreme Military Commander Hun Sen".) Hun Sen
- ហ៊ុន សែន
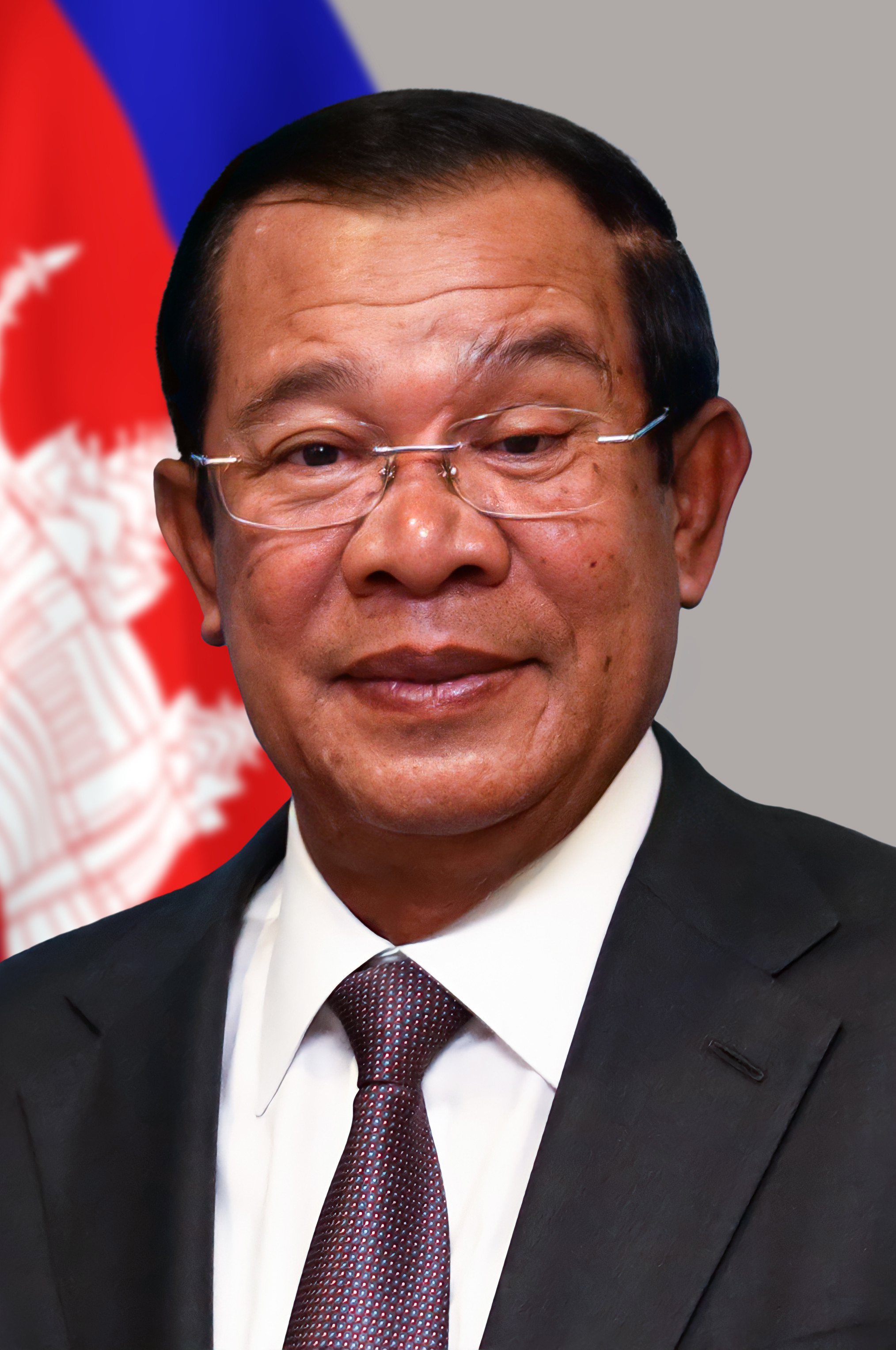
- Hun Sen in 2019

President of the Senate
- Incumbent
- Assumed office 3 April 2024
- Monarch: Norodom Sihamoni
- Vice President: 1st Vice President Prak Sokhonn Ouch Borith; 2nd Vice President Ouch Borith Thun Vathana
- Preceded by: Say Chhum

Prime Minister of Cambodia (Note: From 1985 to 1989 as Prime Minister of the People's Republic of Kampuchea, from 1989 to 1993 of the State of Cambodia and from 1993 to 2023 of the Kingdom of Cambodia.)
- In office 30 November 1998 – 22 August 2023
- Monarchs: Norodom Sihanouk; Chea Sim (a.i. (Note: 1993, 1994, 1995, 1997 (c. 16 July 1997–c. 7 August 1997), 2004, 2004)); Norodom Sihamoni; Say Chhum (a.i. (Note: September 2019–Circa. October 2020, August 2022–Circa. February 2023))
- Deputy: See list: Sar Kheng; Hor Namhong (2004–2023); Tea Banh (2004–2023); Bin Chhin (2007–2023); Yim Chhaily (2008–2023); Men Sam An (2008–2023); Ke Kim Yan (2009–2023); Prak Sokhonn (2018–2023); Aun Pornmoniroth (2018–2023); Chea Sophara (2018–2023)
- Preceded by: Ung Huot (as First Prime Minister of Cambodia); Himself (as Second Prime Minister of Cambodia)
- Succeeded by: Hun Manet
- In office 14 January 1985 – 2 July 1993; Acting: 26 December 1984 – 14 January 1985
- President: Heng Samrin; Chea Sim; Norodom Sihanouk
- Vice President: Say Phouthang
- Deputy: See list: Himself (1984–1985); Bou Thang (1984–1992); Chea Soth (1984–1992); Sar Kheng (1984–1992)
- Preceded by: Chan Sy (as Prime Minister of the People's Republic of Kampuchea)
- Succeeded by: Norodom Ranariddh (as First Prime Minister of Cambodia); Himself (as Second Prime Minister of Cambodia)
- Second Prime Minister of Cambodia
- In office 2 July 1993 – 30 November 1998
- Monarch: Norodom Sihanouk
- Deputy: Sar Kheng
- First Prime Minister: Norodom Ranariddh (1993–1997); Ung Huot (1997–1998)
- Preceded by: Office restored
- Succeeded by: Himself (as Prime Minister)

President of the Cambodian People's Party
- Incumbent
- Assumed office 20 June 2015
- Vice President: Sar Kheng; Say Chhum; Tea Banh; Men Sam An; Hun Manet
- Preceded by: Chea Sim

Chairman of the Supreme Privy Council to the King of Cambodia
- Incumbent
- Assumed office 22 August 2023
- Monarch: Norodom Sihamoni

Minister of Foreign Affairs
- In office 1988–1990
- Prime Minister: Himself
- Preceded by: Kong Korm
- Succeeded by: Hor Namhong
- In office 8 January 1979 – December 1986
- Prime Minister: Pen Sovan; Chan Sy; Himself
- Preceded by: Ieng Sary
- Succeeded by: Kong Korm

Leader of the People's Republic of Kampuchea/State of Cambodia
- In office 1985–1990
- Preceded by: Heng Samrin and Say Phouthang
- Succeeded by: Chea Sim

Deputy Prime Minister of the People's Republic of Kampuchea
- In office 1981–1985 Serving with Bou Thang and Chea Soth (1982–1985)
- President: Heng Samrin
- Prime Minister: Pen Sovann; Chan Sy; Himself
- Preceded by: Son Sen (1979)
- Succeeded by: Bou Thang and Chea Soth

Member of the National Assembly
- In office 14 June 1993 – 2 April 2024
- Constituency: Kampong Cham (1993–1998); Kandal (1998–2024)

Personal details
- Born: Hun Bunal; 5 August 1952 (age 74) Peam Kaoh Sna, French Cambodia
- Party: Cambodian People's Party
- Other political affiliations: Kampuchean People's Revolutionary Party (1979–1991)
- Spouse: Bun Rany (m. 1976)
- Children: 6, including Manet, Manith, and Many
- Parent(s): Hun Neang; Dee Yon
- Education: National Academy of Public Administration
- Awards: Grand Order of National Merit
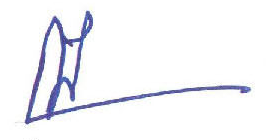
- Signature
- Website: Official website

Military service
- Allegiance: Democratic Kampuchea; People's Republic of Kampuchea; State of Cambodia; Kingdom of Cambodia
- Branch/service: Khmer Rouge; Kampuchean United Front for National Salvation; Kampuchean People's Revolutionary Army; Cambodian People's Army; Royal Cambodian Army
- Years of service: 1970–1999
- Rank: General of the Army
- Commands: Democratic Kampuchea – Eastern Region; Kampuchean People's Revolutionary Armed Forces; Cambodian People's Armed Forces; Royal Cambodian Armed Forces
- Battles/wars: Cambodian Civil War (WIA); Cambodian–Vietnamese War; 1997 Cambodian coup d'état

Hun Sen (Note: /hʊn sɛn/; Khmer: ហ៊ុន សែន, UNGEGN: Hŭn Saen [hun saen]) (born 5 August 1952) is a Cambodian politician and former military officer who currently serves as the president of the Senate. He previously served as the prime minister of Cambodia (1985–1993), the second prime minister (1993–1998) and the prime minister again (1998–2023). Hun Sen is the longest-serving head of government in Cambodia's history. He is the president of the Cambodian People's Party (CPP), originally known as the Kampuchean People's Revolutionary Party (KPRP), which has governed Cambodia since 1979, and has served as a member of the Senate since 2024. Hun Sen has been regarded as the de facto leader of Cambodia since circa 1993; since 2023, he is also seen as de facto Minister of Foreign Affairs in his capacity as the President of Senate.

Born Hun Bunal, (Note: Khmer: ហ៊ុន ប៊ុនណាល់, UNGEGN: Hŭn Bŭnǎl; Khmer pronunciation: [hun ɓunnal]) he changed his name to Hun Sen in 1972, two years after joining the Khmer Rouge as a soldier. He fought for the Khmer Rouge in the Cambodian Civil War and was a battalion commander in Democratic Kampuchea until defecting in 1977 and fighting alongside Vietnamese forces in the Cambodian–Vietnamese War. From 1979 to 1986 and again from 1987 to 1990, he served as Cambodia's foreign minister in the puppet government installed by Vietnam. At age 26, he was also the world's youngest foreign minister.

Hun Sen rose to the premiership in January 1985 when the one-party National Assembly appointed him to succeed Chan Sy, who had died in office in December 1984. He held the position until the 1993 UN-backed elections which resulted in a hung parliament, with the monarchist opposition party FUNCINPEC winning the majority of votes. Hun Sen refused to accept the result. After negotiations with FUNCINPEC, Norodom Ranariddh and Hun Sen agreed to simultaneously serve as First and Second Prime Minister, until the coalition broke down and Sen orchestrated a coup d'état in 1997 which toppled Ranariddh. Between 1998 and 2023, Hun Sen led the CPP to consecutive and often contentious election victories, overseeing rapid economic growth and development, but also corruption, deforestation and human rights violations. In 2013, Hun Sen and the CPP were reelected with a significantly reduced majority amidst a resurgent opposition. Allegations of voter fraud and irregularities led to unprecedented anti-government protests. In 2018, he was elected to a sixth and final term in a largely unopposed poll after the Supreme Court dissolved the main opposition party, with the CPP winning every seat in the National Assembly. He led the country during the onset of the COVID-19 pandemic and Cambodia's third chairmanship of ASEAN; and, after the 2023 election formally announced his resignation as prime minister in favour of his son, Hun Manet. He remains as party leader and in 2024, was appointed president of the Senate, ensuring his continued influence over the country's politics.

Hun Sen has been prominent in communist, Marxist–Leninist, and now state capitalist and national conservative political parties, and although Khmer nationalism has been a consistent trait of all of them, he is thought to lack a core political ideology. He has been described as a "wily operator who destroys his political opponents" by The Sydney Morning Herald and as a dictator who has assumed highly centralized power in Cambodia and considerable personal wealth using violence and corruption, including a personal guard said to rival the country's regular army.

== Early life and education ==
Hun Sen was born on 5 August 1952, in Peam Kaoh Sna, Kampong Cham as Hun Bunal (also called Hun Nal), the third of six children. His father, Hun Neang, had been a resident monk in a local Wat in Kampong Cham province before defrocking himself to join the French resistance and marry Hun Sen's mother, Dee Yon, in the 1940s. Hun Neang's paternal grandparents were wealthy landowners of Chinese heritage. His Chinese ancestry is at Zhuanshui Village, Tanjiang Town, Fengshun County.

Hun Neang inherited some of his family assets, including several hectares of land, and led a relatively comfortable life until a kidnapping incident forced their family to sell off much of their assets. Hun Nal left his family at the age of 13 to attend a monastic school in Phnom Penh. At the time, he changed his name to Ritthi Sen or simply Sen; his prior given name, Nal, was often a nickname for overweight children.

He graduated with a master's degree in state administrative management from the National Academy of Public Administration of Vietnam. He completed his Ph.D. in political science at the Nguyen Ai Quoc Academy (now the Ho Chi Minh National Academy of Politics).

== Military career and entry to politics ==
When Lon Nol removed Norodom Sihanouk from power in 1970, Sen gave up his education to join the Khmer Rouge following Sihanouk's call to join the insurgency. Sen also claims he was inspired to fight against foreign interference when his hometown of Memot was bombed by U.S. aircraft in Operation Menu. Sen claims he had no political opinions or ideology at the time. As a soldier, he again changed his name, this time to Hun Samrach, to conceal his identity.

He changed his name to Hun Sen two years later, saying that the name Hun Samrach had been inauspicious and that he had been wounded several times during the period he had that name. Sen rapidly ascended ranks as a soldier, and fought during the fall of Phnom Penh, becoming injured and being hospitalized for some time and sustaining a permanent eye injury.

In Democratic Kampuchea, Sen served as a Battalion Commander in the Eastern Region, with authority over around 2000 men. The involvement or role of Sen in the Cambodian genocide is unclear, although he denies complicity. Human Rights Watch suggested he may have had a role in a massacre to suppress Cham Muslim unrest in September–October 1975, but Sen has denied this, claiming that he had stopped following orders from the central government by this time. Sen claims he had increasing disagreements with Khmer Rouge authorities in the administration throughout 1975–1977.

In 1977, during internal purges of the Khmer Rouge regime, Hun Sen and his battalion cadres fled to Vietnam. During the Cambodian–Vietnamese War as Vietnam prepared to invade Cambodia, Hun Sen became one of the leaders of the Vietnamese-sponsored rebel army. He was given the secret name Mai Phúc (Note: Means "forever happiness".) by Vietnamese leaders.

Following the defeat of the Khmer Rouge regime, Hun Sen was appointed as Deputy Prime Minister and Foreign Minister of the Vietnamese-installed People's Republic of Kampuchea/State of Cambodia (PRK/SOC) in 1979 at age 26. The Vietnamese-appointed government appointed Sen some authority over the K5 Plan, a Khmer Rouge containment strategy that saw the mass mobilization of civilian labor in constructing barricades and land mines, although the extent of his involvement is unclear.

== First appointment as prime minister (1985–1993) ==
Hun Sen first rose to the premiership in January 1985 when the one-party National Assembly encouraged by politburo cadre Say Phouthang appointed him to succeed Chan Sy, who had died in office in December 1984. As the de facto leader of Cambodia, in 1985, he was elected as Chairman of the Council of Ministers and Prime Minister. Sen oversaw continuing conflict against several ongoing insurgencies during this period.

In 1987, Amnesty International accused Hun Sen's government of torturing thousands of political prisoners, using "electric shocks, hot irons and near-suffocation with plastic bags."

=== Paris Peace Talks and UNTAC (1991–1993) ===
As foreign minister and then prime minister, Hun Sen played a role in the 1991 Paris Peace Talks, which brokered peace in Cambodia and formally ended the Cambodian–Vietnamese War.

He held the position of prime minister during the United Nations Transitional Authority in Cambodia (UNTAC) until the 1993 UN-sponsored elections, which resulted opposition party FUNCINPEC winning the majority of votes with a hung parliament. Hun Sen and his party formally rejected the result. With the support of much of the state apparatus, including the army and police, Hun Sen and his deputy Norodom Chakrapong threatened to lead the secession of seven provinces and CPP-backed forces committed violence against UN and FUNCINPEC forces although Sen distanced himself from the secessionist movement a few days later. UNTAC and FUNCINPEC conceded a unique power sharing agreement with Hun Sen serving as Second Prime Minister alongside First Prime Minister Norodom Ranariddh.

=== 1997 coup ===
In 1997, the coalition became unstable due to tensions between Ranariddh and Hun Sen. FUNCINPEC entered into discussions with the remaining Khmer Rouge rebels (with whom it had been allied against Hun Sen's Vietnamese-backed government during the 1980s), with the aim of absorbing them into its ranks. Such a development would have altered the balance of military power between royalists and the CPP.

In response, Hun Sen launched the 1997 coup, replacing Ranariddh with Ung Huot as the First Prime Minister and maintaining his position as the Second Prime Minister.

In an open letter, Amnesty International condemned the summary execution of FUNCINPEC ministers and the "systematic campaign of arrests and harassment" of political opponents. Thomas Hammarberg, then Special Representative of the Secretary-General for Human Rights in Cambodia, strongly condemned the coup.

== Prime Minister of Cambodia (1998–2023) ==
In the 1998 election, he led the CPP to victory and forming a coalition with FUNCINPEC.

The elections of July 2003 resulted in a larger majority in the National Assembly for the CPP, with FUNCINPEC losing seats to the CPP and the Sam Rainsy Party. However, the CPP's majority was short of the two thirds constitutionally required for the CPP to form a government alone. This deadlock was overcome when a new CPP-FUNCINPEC coalition was formed in mid-2004, with Norodom Ranariddh chosen to be head of the National Assembly and Hun Sen again becoming sole prime minister.

Sen has opposed extensive investigations and prosecutions related to crimes committed by former Khmer Rouge leaders by the UN-backed Khmer Rouge Tribunal.

On 6 May 2013, Hun Sen declared his intention to rule Cambodia until the age of 74.

=== 2013–2014 protests ===
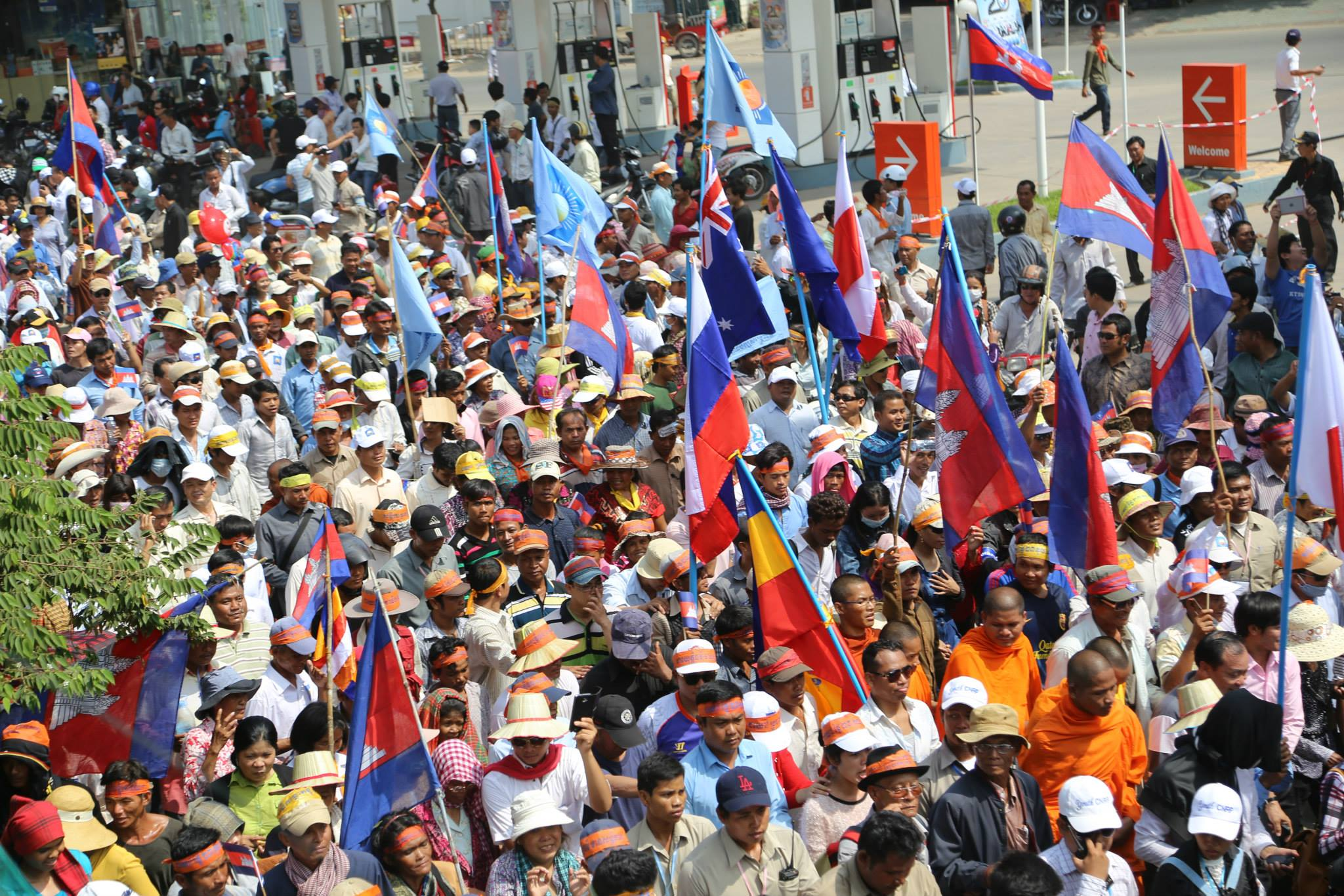
Protesters against Hun Sen's regime in Cambodia.

After the July 2013 general elections both Hun Sen and his opponents Cambodia National Rescue Party claimed victory. In August, Hun Sen continued to pursue his aim of forming a new government. Cambodians in the United States, Canada and elsewhere, with hundreds of Buddhist Monks, peacefully protested in front of the United Nations in New York City on 19 August in opposition to Hun Sen's deployment of military and security forces in Phnom Penh, his unwillingness to share political power with opposition groups and seriously address earlier voting fraud and election irregularities.

One person was killed and others injured during protests in Phnom Penh in September 2013, where a reported 20,000 protesters gathered, some clashing with riot police. Following two weeks of opposition protests, Hun Sen declared that he had been constitutionally elected and would not step down nor hold a new election.

On 7 September 2013, tens of thousands of Cambodians, along with Buddhist monks and opposition groups, including Sam Rainsy's Cambodian National Rescue Party held mass demonstrations in Phnom Penh to protest the 28 July elections results which they claimed were flawed and marred by voting irregularities and potential fraud. The groups asked the United Nations to investigate and claimed that the elections results were not free and fair.

On 3 January 2014, military police opened fire at protesters, killing 4 people and injuring more than 20. The United Nations and US State Department condemned the violence. US Congressman Ed Royce responded to the report of violence in Cambodia by calling for Hun Sen to step down, saying that the Cambodian people deserve a better leader.

=== Consolidation of power (2015– 2023) ===
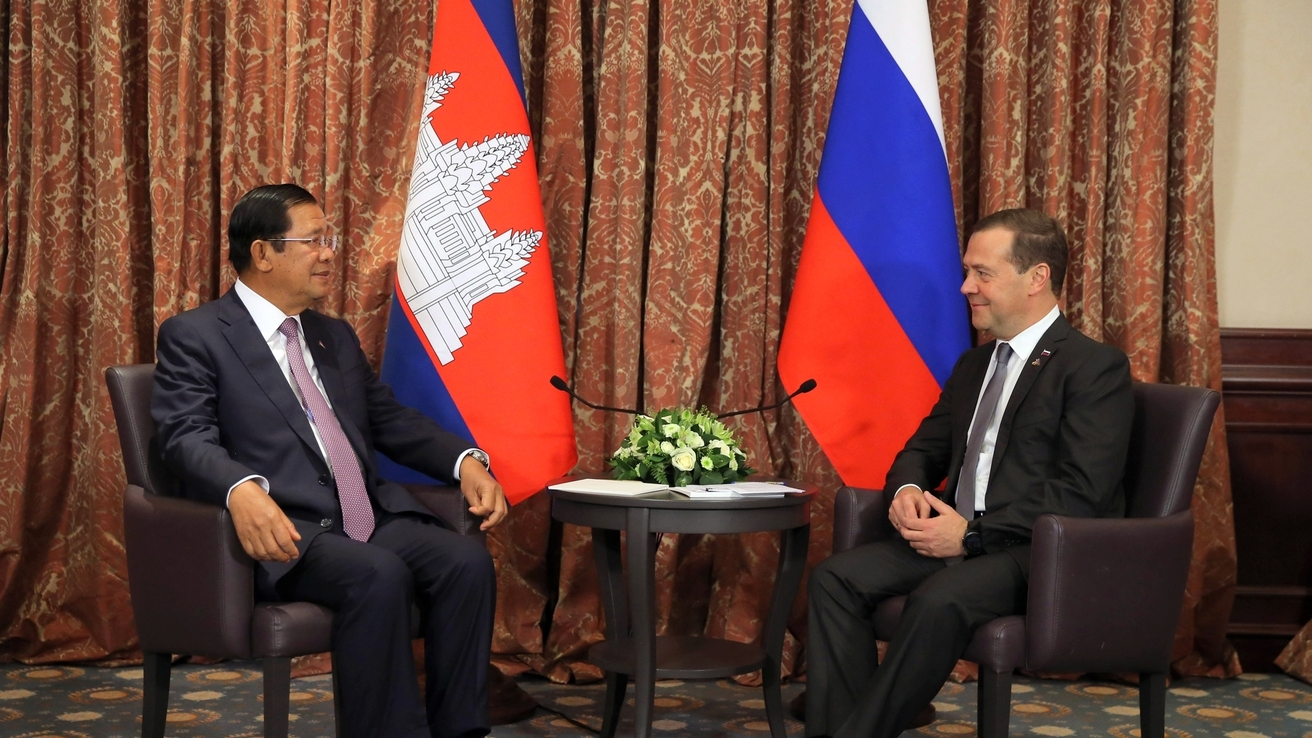
Hun Sen with Russian Prime Minister Dmitry Medvedev on 18 October 2018

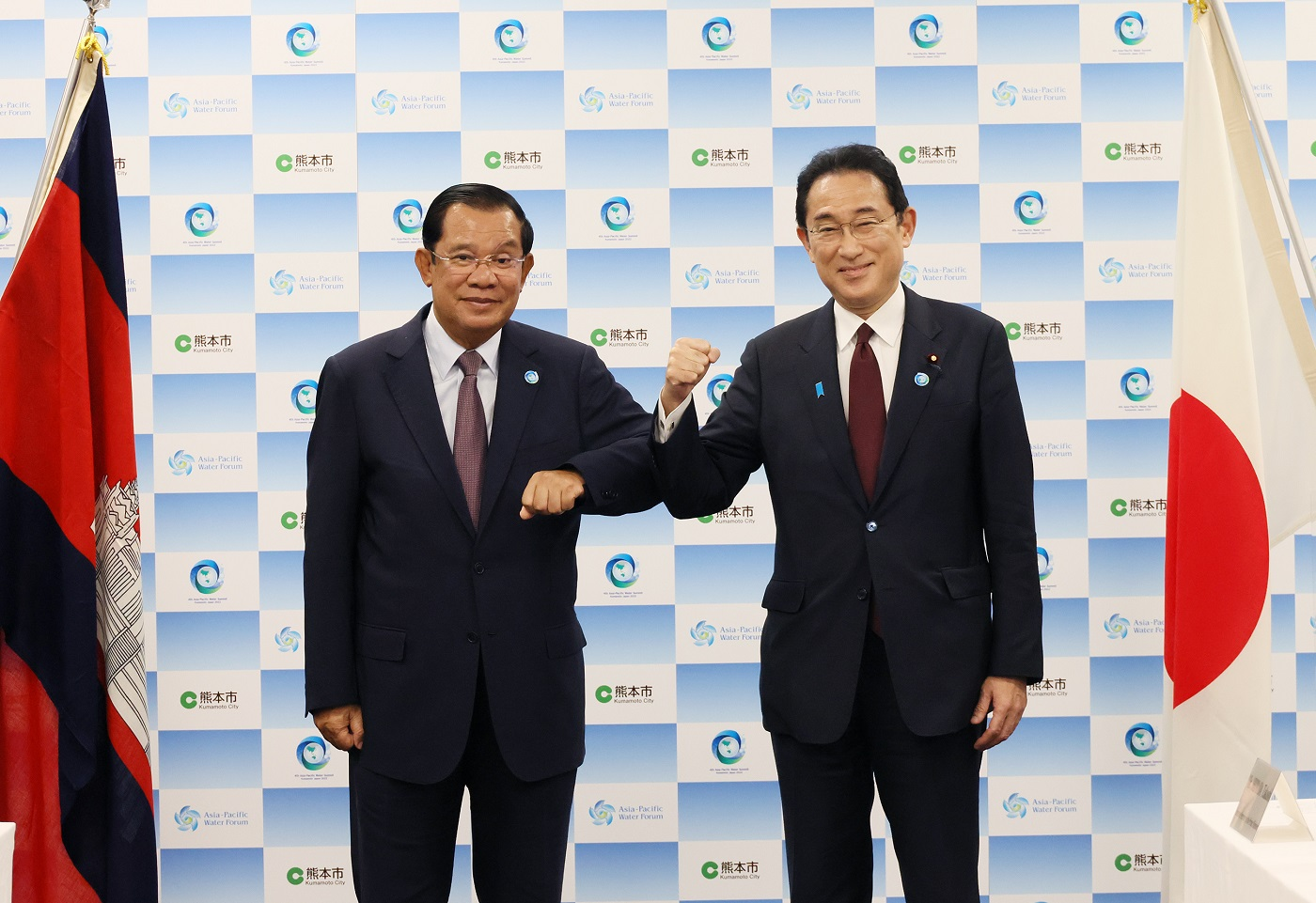
Hun Sen with Japanese Prime Minister Fumio Kishida in Kumamoto, Japan on 23 April 2022.

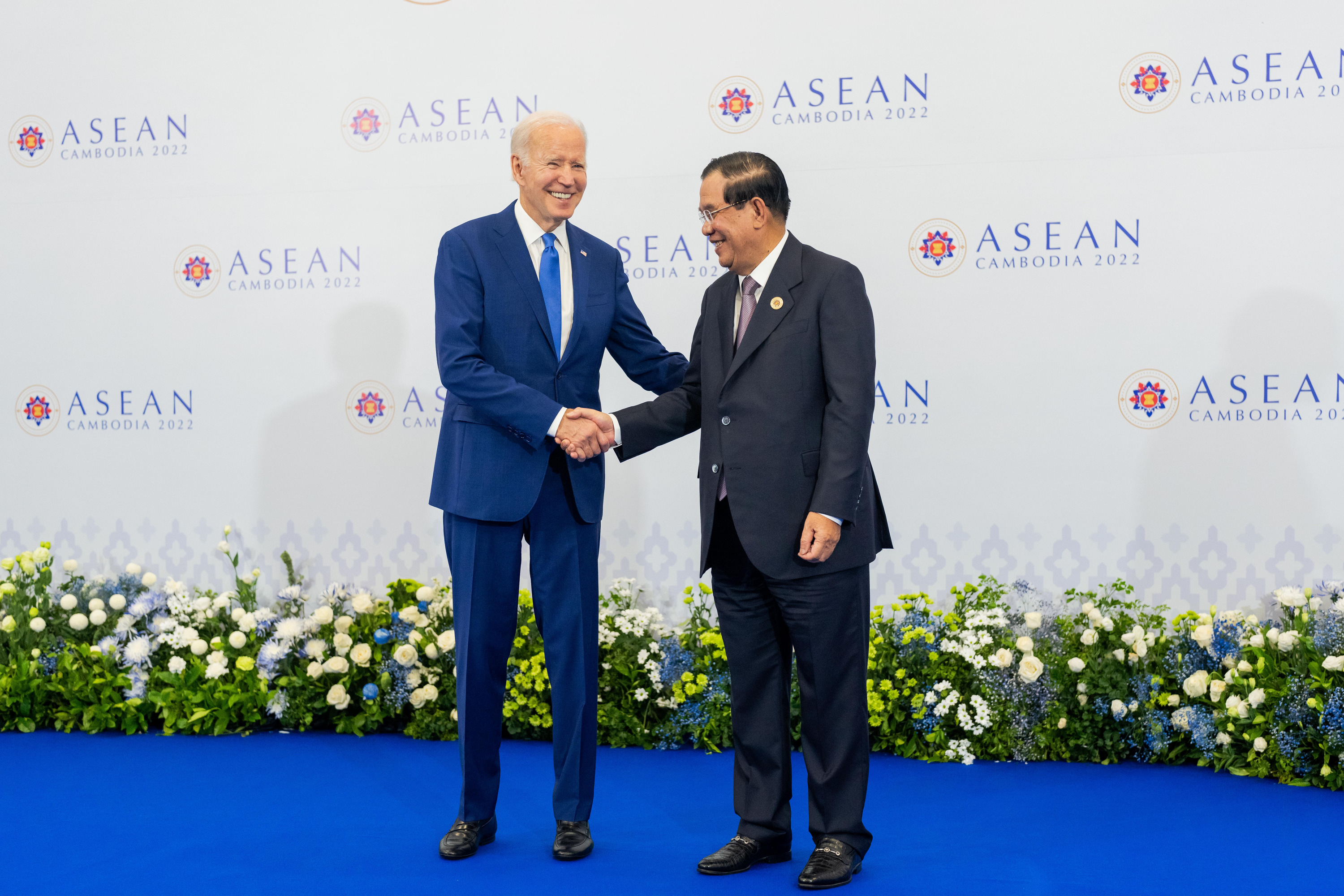
Hun Sen with US President Joe Biden during the ASEAN Summit in Phnom Penh, 12 November 2022.

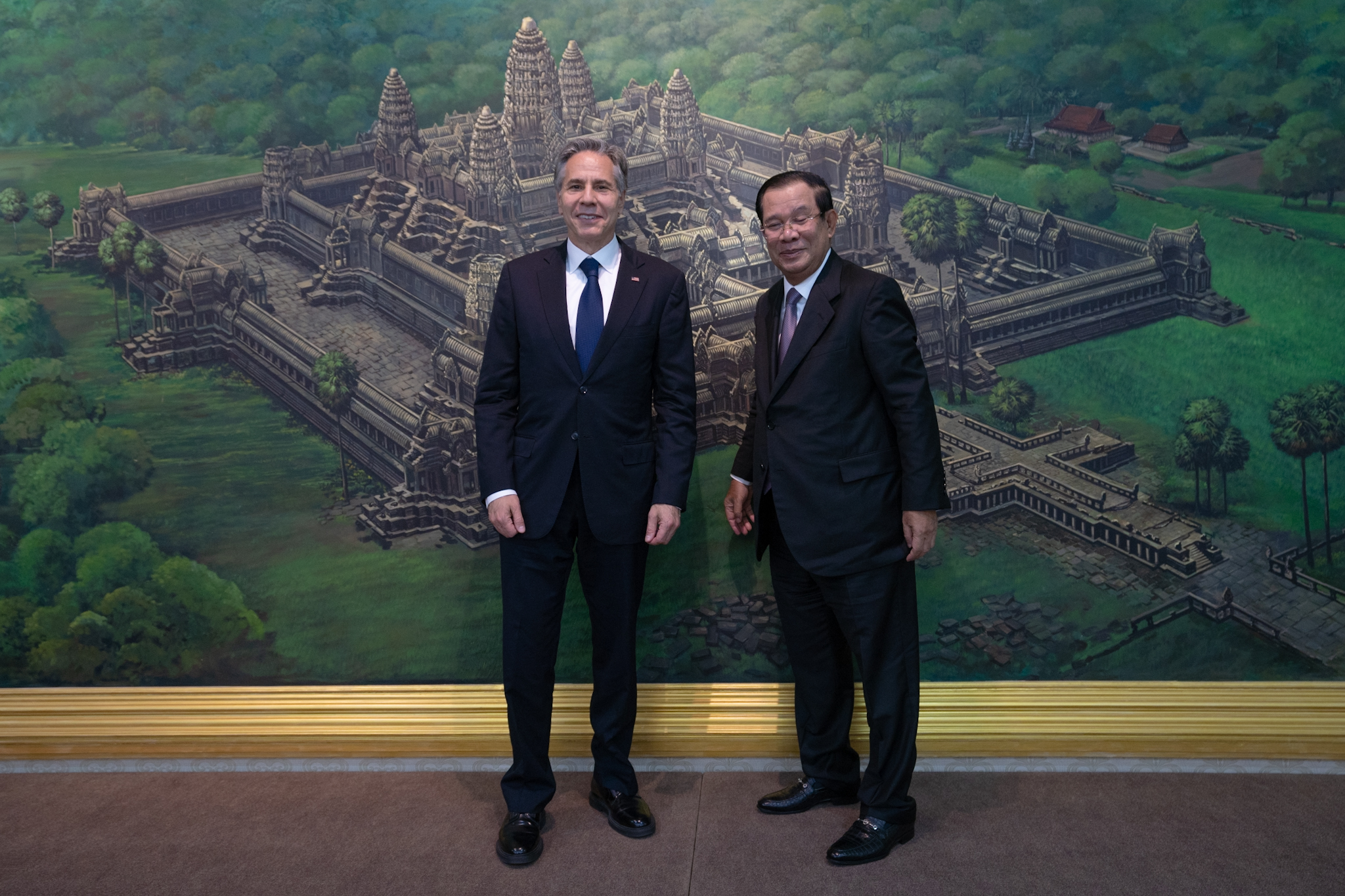
Hun Sen with US Secretary of State Antony Blinken in Phnom Penh, Cambodia on 4 August 2022

On 10 June 2014, Hun Sen made a public appearance and claimed he has no health problems. He warned that if he were to die prematurely, the country would spin out of control and the opposition could expect trouble from the armed forces, saying he is the only person who can control the army.

In 2017, disputes occurred on the Cambodia–Laos border, and Hun Sen called on the Laotian army to leave Cambodian territory.

Following Hun Sen's orders, on 31 January 2017, the National Assembly voted unanimously to abolish the Minority Leader and Majority Leader positions to lessen the opposition party's influence. On 2 February 2017, Hun Sen barred the opposition from questioning some of his government ministers. Furthermore, Hun Sen vowed a constitutional amendment which later saw the opposition Cambodia National Rescue Party dissolved. This move led to the surprise resignation of opposition leader Sam Rainsy. The controversial law was passed on 20 February 2017, effectively granting the ruling party the right to dissolve political parties. Opposition leader Kem Sokha was later arrested for treason.

On 30 June 2018, weeks before the parliamentary elections, Hun Sen appointed his second eldest son, Hun Manet, into higher military positions. Some analysts had speculated Manet may be a future candidate for Sen's position. Hun Sen affirmed at the time that his son could become prime minister if elected rather than through direct handover, though he intends to rule until at least 2028.

The 2018 elections were dismissed as sham elections by the international community, the opposition party having been dissolved.

Hun Sen blocked the return of exiled Cambodia National Rescue Party leaders to Cambodia, including Sam Rainsy and Mu Sochua, in November 2019. He ordered the military to "attack" them on sight should they return, threatened airlines with legal actions for allowing them to board, deployed thousands of troops to the Thai and Vietnamese borders, and requested other ASEAN leaders arrest them and deport them to Cambodia.

In 2020, the European Union suspended its Everything but Arms preferential trade agreement with Cambodia due to concerns over human rights violations under Hun Sen's government. Sen criticized the move as "biased" and "unfair", including at the United Nations General Assembly in 2020.

During the early stages of the COVID-19 pandemic, Hun Sen downplayed the risk of the virus and declined to introduce preventative measures or evacuate Cambodian citizens from Wuhan during the initial outbreak in China. It was widely reported this was in an attempt to show solidarity with China, one of Cambodia's closest diplomatic and economic allies. Hun Sen visited China during the outbreak and offered to visit Wuhan specifically during its lockdown. In February 2020, at a press conference, he criticized the media for sensationalizing the virus, and threatened to expel those present who were wearing masks. Hun Sen was also present to welcome passengers of the MS Westerdam cruise ship to dock in Sihanoukville, after it was turned away from other countries. Cambodia started implementing preventative measures and travel restrictions from March 2020 as the pandemic spread globally.

A new State of Emergency Law prepared in response to COVID-19 granted Hun Sen further powers to restrict movement and assembly, seize private property and enforce quarantine. The new law has been criticised by Amnesty International for curbing human rights.

Ultimately, the government's successful vaccination efforts and pandemic response were viewed by the Cambodian public as contributing to the perceived legitimacy and effectiveness of the government. A study conducted by IEAS found that more than 80% of those surveyed approved of the government response, with more than 25% strongly approving of the response.

On 10 July 2023, Hun Sen warned Ukraine of using cluster munitions, saying "It would be the greatest danger for Ukrainians for many years or up to a hundred years if cluster bombs are used in Russian-occupied areas in the territory of Ukraine," Sen further cited his country's "painful experience" from the Vietnam War that has killed or maimed tens of thousands of Cambodians.

Following controversy over the 23 July 2023 elections, the King confirmed that Hun Manet would succeed Hun Sen as prime minister.

=== Corruption and land issues ===
Hun Sen and his family were estimated to have amassed between US$500 million and US$1 billion by Global Witness in 2016, and a number of allies have also accumulated considerable personal wealth during his tenure.

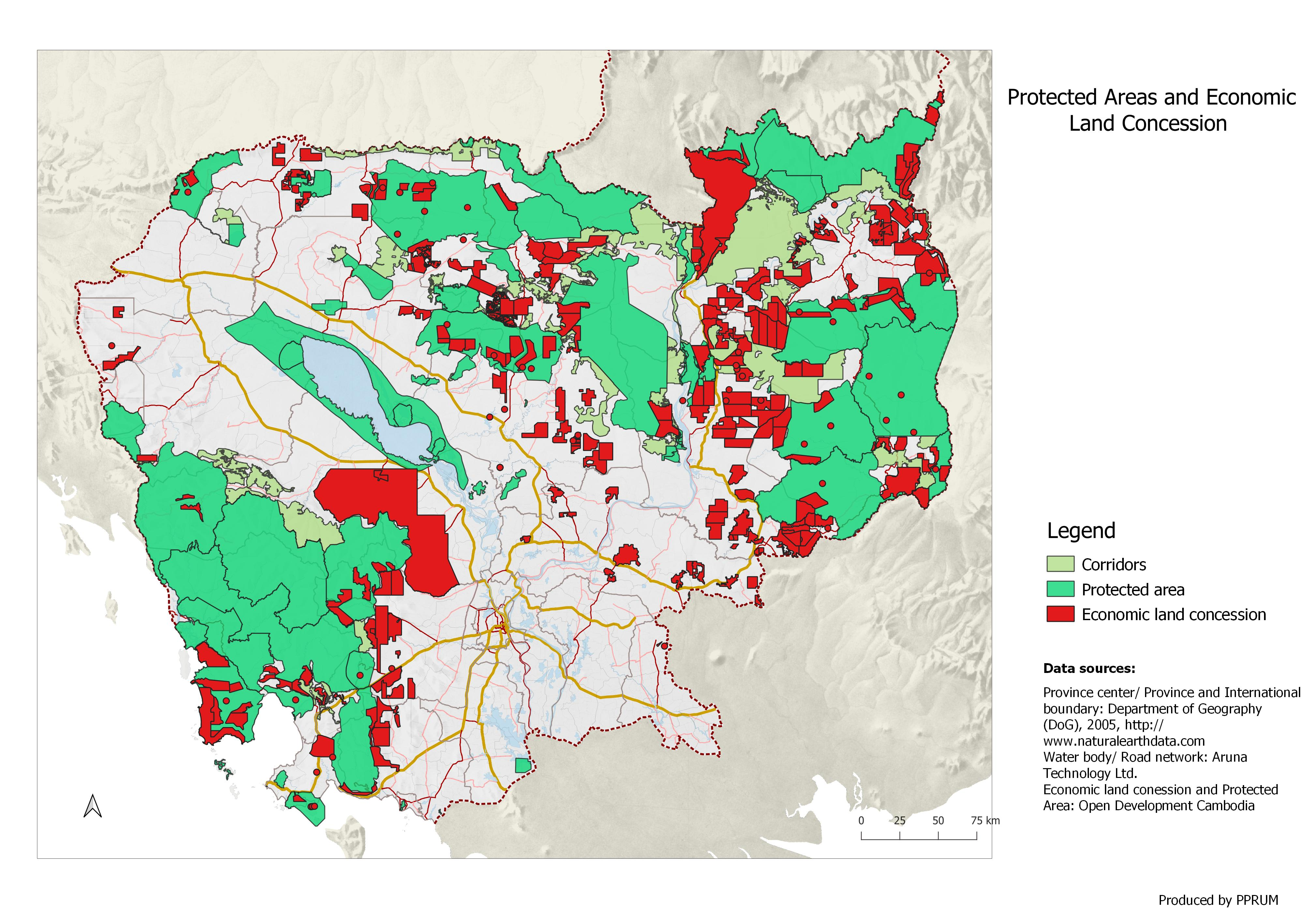
Deforestation in Cambodia is partly driven by Economic Land Concessions (ELCs) within protected areas.

Hun Sen implemented land reform, the "leopard skin land reform", in Cambodia. Hun Sen's government has been responsible for leasing 45% of the total landmass in Cambodia—primarily to foreign investors—in the years 2007–08, threatening more than 150,000 Cambodians with eviction. Parts of the concessions are protected wildlife areas or national parks and have driven deforestation across the country. As of 2015, Cambodia had one of the highest rates of forest loss in the world. The land sales have been perceived by observers as government corruption and have resulted in thousands of citizens being forcibly evicted. According to Alice Beban, the land reform strengthened patronage politics in Cambodia and did not enable land tenure security.

Hun Sen was implicated in corruption related to Cambodia's oil wealth and mineral resources in the Global Witness 2009 report on Cambodia. He and his close associates were accused of carrying out secret negotiations with interested private parties, taking money from those who would be granted rights to exploit the country's resources in return. The credibility of this accusation has been challenged by government officials and especially Prime Minister Hun Sen, himself.

=== Human rights issues ===
Sen and the CPP were accused of orchestrating summary executions during the 1997 coup.

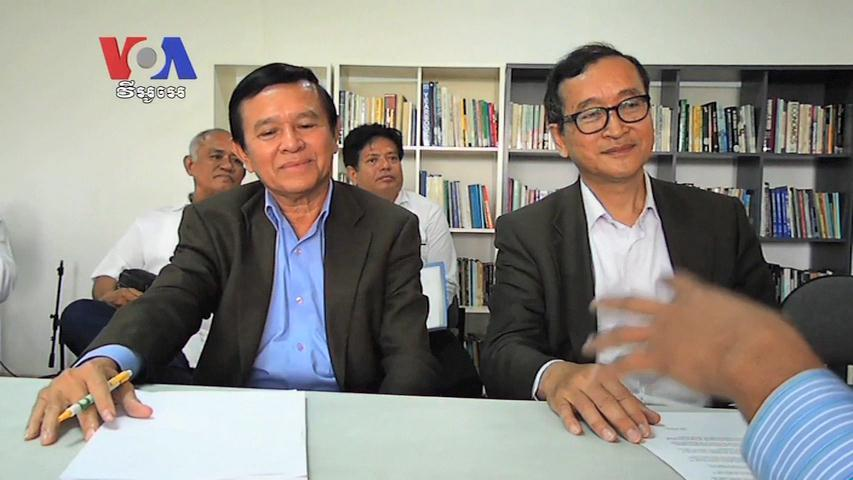
Cambodia's deputy opposition leader Kem Sokha (left) was arrested in September 2017, while opposition leader Sam Rainsy (right) has lived in exile since November 2015.

Hun Sen frequently calls for violence against his political opponents during seemingly irrelevant public events, often characterizing this as necessary to maintain peace and stability in Cambodia. In 2017, he said he would be prepared to "eliminate 100 or 200 people if they would destabilize the peace in Cambodia" while speaking at commemoration for his defection from the Khmer Rouge. In 2019, as opposition party leaders prepared to return to the country, Sen ordered the military to "attack them wherever you see them—you don't need arrest warrants at all" while speaking at a graduation ceremony for exceptional high school students in Phnom Penh. He also threatened the European Union if they withdrew a commercial deal: "If you want the opposition dead, do it. If you want it alive, don't do it and come and talk", although they did not give in. "We didn't pursue you because we didn't want to kill you at the time," Hun Sen said to opposition leader Sam Rainsy, although such death threats have not been implemented.

Hun Sen's Cambodian People's Party (CPP) has banned public gatherings, driven opposition supporters from the site of former protest meetings 'Freedom Park', and deployed riot police to beat protesters and detain union leaders.

Several Australian politicians, most prominently Gareth Evans and Julian Hill, have been highly critical of Sen and his government over human rights issues and have called for changes to Australia–Cambodia relations.

After the execution of 4 prisoners in July 2022 in Myanmar, Hun Sen warned to rethink the peace agreement if the regime continued to execute prisoners.

=== Foreign relations ===
Sen has frequently criticized Western powers such as the European Union and United States in response to their sanctions on Cambodia over human rights issues. In November 2023, he called for a ceasefire in the Gaza war, warning that "Without a ceasefire, Gaza will become the world's largest massacre site."

==== China ====
Sen strengthened a close diplomatic and economic relationship with China, which has undertaken large-scale infrastructure projects and investments in Cambodia under the Belt and Road Initiative.

During the COVID-19 pandemic, China provided major assistance to the Hun Sen government's vaccination campaign. As of early November 2021, China had sent more than 35 million vaccines to Cambodia. China provided many of them free of charge. Vaccines provided by China accounted for more than 90% of total vaccines provided to Cambodia from other countries. China also provided other health care supplies as well as medical professionals to Cambodia during the pandemic. In part thanks to Chinese contributions, Cambodia had the second-highest vaccination rate in Southeast Asia, despite having the second lowest per capita GDP in the region.

==== Thailand ====
Sen oversaw a number of diplomatic disputes with neighboring Thailand.

The 2003 Phnom Penh riots resulted in the ransacking of the Thai embassy in Cambodia, following false allegations that a Thai soap opera actress Suvanant Punnakant claimed that Angkor Wat belonged to Thailand. Sen called for a boycott of Thai goods and television shows and criticized the actress shortly before the riots. The riots and Sen's response severely damaged Cambodia–Thailand relations. Sen's Thai counterpart Thaksin Shinawatra closed the borders, expelled the Cambodian ambassador and evacuated Thai citizens from Phnom Penh in response. Thaksin also sent a warning to Hun Sen after witness reports suggested the army and police had not intervened until the embassy was destroyed. Sam Rainsy accused Sen of inciting the riot.

From 2008 to 2013, the Cambodian–Thai border dispute was an ongoing conflict, which on a number of occasions led to fighting between Cambodian and Thai forces. Sen and Thai premier Abhisit Vejjajiva negotiated a de-escalation on several occasions with the encouragement of ASEAN. Cambodia was granted sovereignty over the Preah Vihear area by a UN court in 2013, ending the dispute.

In June 2025, during the 2025 Cambodian-Thai border crisis, a phone call between him and Thai Prime Minister Paetongtarn Shinawatra was leaked. Paetongtarn was officially removed from office in August 2025.

==== Myanmar ====
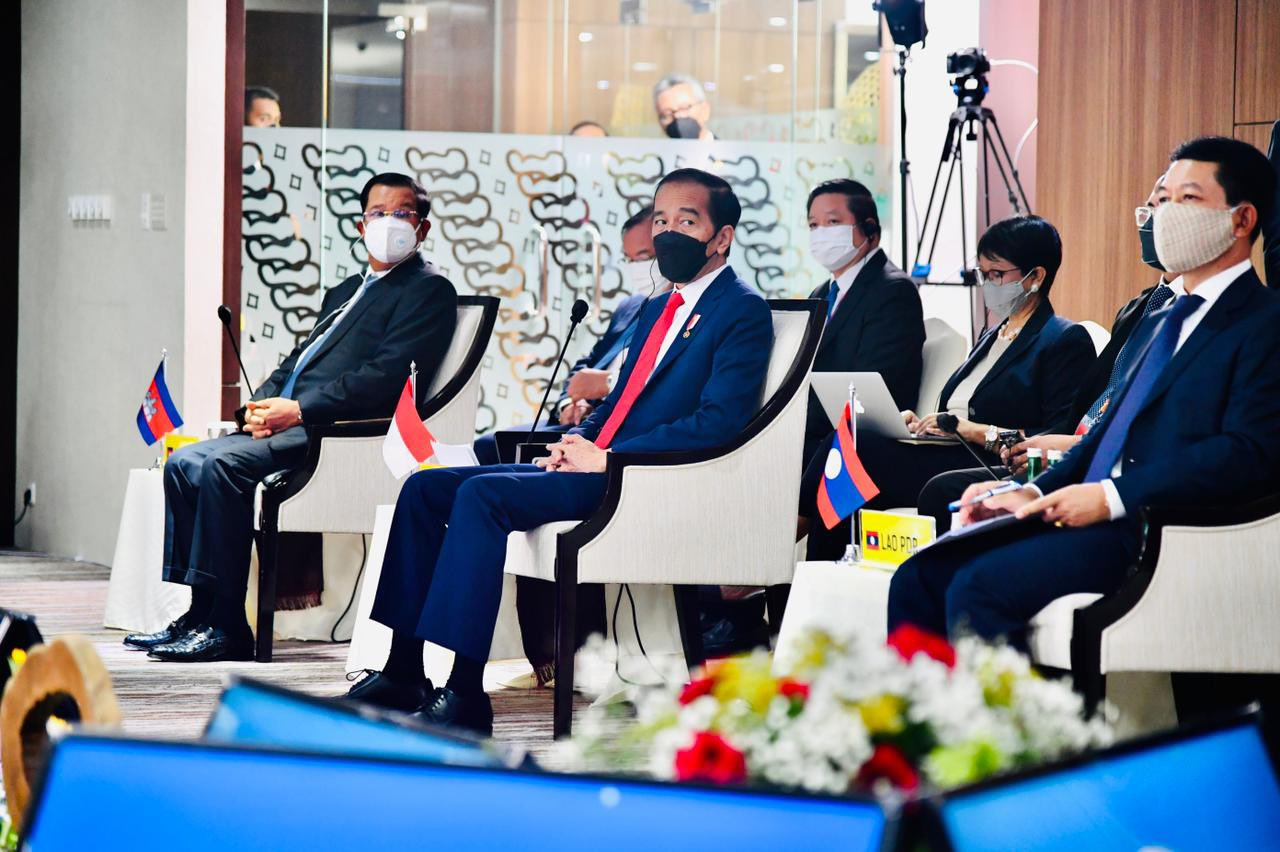
Hun Sen at a 2021 ASEAN Summit on Myanmar with Joko Widodo.

In his capacity as chairman of ASEAN, Sen became the first foreign leader to visit Myanmar following the 2021 coup d'état.

==== United States ====
In November 2016, Hun Sen publicly endorsed US Republican presidential candidate Donald Trump who went on to be elected president.

== President of the Senate (2024–present) ==
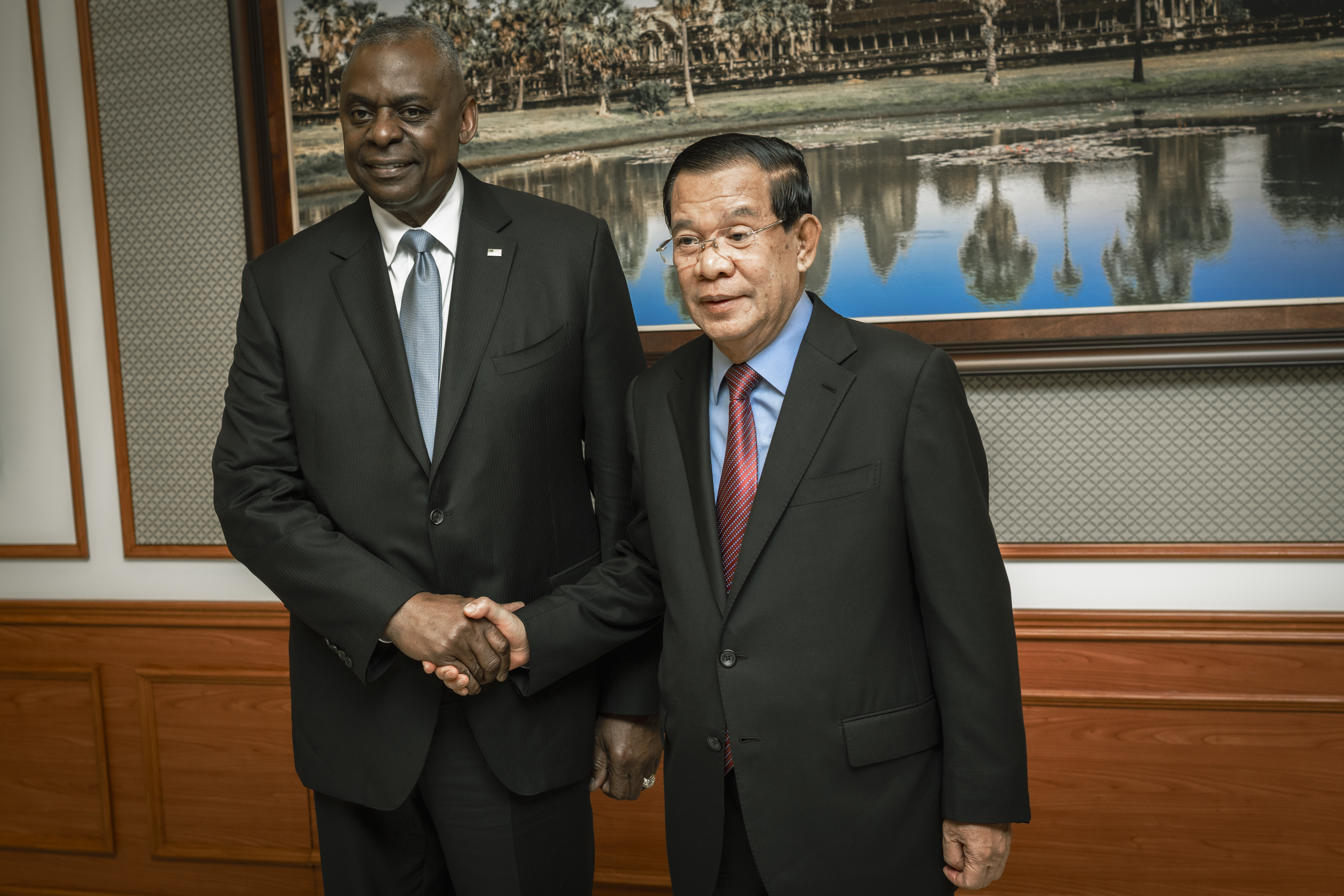
Senate President Hun Sen meets with U.S. Secretary of Defense Lloyd Austin in Phnom Penh, 4 June 2024.

The Cambodian People's Party claimed an expected landslide victory in the 2024 Senate election, paving the way for Hun Sen to become its president when the new Senate convenes. He resigned from his National Assembly seat on 2 April, allowing him to take his seat in the Senate. The full Senate unanimously confirmed him as president on 3 April.

Since May 2025, he has taken on a leading role in the Cambodian response to the border crisis with Thailand which eventually led to border clashes in July 2025.

== Public image ==
In Cambodia, Hun Sen's core support base is from the majority of the population who reside in the countryside and work in the agricultural sector. He is less popular in urban centers like Phnom Penh.

Hun Sen's leadership has received criticism from various organizations, media and foreign governments for corruption, cronyism, environmental degradation, human rights violations and violence. Hun Sen and his government was described by former Prime Minister of Singapore Lee Kuan Yew in 2000 as "utterly merciless and ruthless, without humane feelings".

=== Alleged Vietnamese ties ===
Some political opponents of Hun Sen have criticized him for alleged ties to Vietnam. Norodom Sihanouk once referred to him as a "one-eyed lackey of the Vietnamese", with Sam Rainsy and members of the Cambodia National Rescue Party later echoing similar sentiments during the 2010s. This is due to his position in the puppet government installed by Vietnam and prominence in figure in the People's Revolutionary Party of Kampuchea. Anti-Vietnamese sentiment and racism is common in Cambodia.

== Control of media ==
Although Cambodia had relatively independent press during and immediately following the UNTAC era, Hun Sen and the CPP have since come to strictly control media in Cambodia. This has more recently encompassed social media, which surpassed traditional media as a news source for Cambodians in 2017.

=== Television, radio, and newspapers ===
Bayon Television is owned and operated by Hun Mana, Hun Sen's eldest daughter. Apsara TV is joint-owned by Say Sam Al, CPP Minister of Environment and son of Say Chhum, CPP secretary and the son of CPP Deputy Prime Minister Sok An. CTN, CNC and MyTV are all owned by Khmer-Chinese tycoon, Kith Meng.

CPP officials claim that there is no connection between the TV stations and the state. However, CPP lawmaker and official spokesman Cheam Yeap once stated "We pay for that television [coverage] by buying broadcasting hours to show our achievements".

A demand for television and radio licenses was one of 10 opposition requests adopted by the Cambodia National Rescue Party (CNRP) at its "People's Congress" in October 2013.

Radio stations were banned from broadcasting Voice of America and Radio Free Asia in August 2017. The country's most prominent independent newspaper Cambodia Daily was closed on 4 September 2017, a day after the main opposition leader Kem Sokha was arrested for treason. The Phnom Penh Post, another widely circulated independent newspaper, was sold to a Malaysian investor with ties to Hun Sen in 2018, which undermined its independence and aligned it closer to the government.

=== Social media and suspension from Facebook ===
Facebook and the internet became widely used in Cambodia during the 2010s. It is thought that its adoption by the Cambodia National Rescue Party played a role in the party's gains in the 2013 election.

In the mid-2010s, Hun Sen and the Cambodian People's Party became enthusiastic users of Facebook. Hun Sen declared in February 2016 they had become an "electronic government" and regularly posted and livestreams of speeches, announcements, and selfies to million of followers. In 2017, Hun Sen's official page was the eighth-most liked Facebook page of any world leader and as of December 2020 was the most liked Facebook page in Cambodia.

Facebook activity in Cambodia is monitored by the authorities, and criticism of the government and prime minister on Facebook has led to several arrests in the country. Cambodia has also prosecuted women who post images of themselves wearing revealing clothing on Facebook, with Hun Sen saying it is "a violation of culture and tradition" and invites sexual harassment. Amnesty International criticized this speech, characterizing it as "victim blaming" and contributing to violence against women.

On 29 June 2023, Hun Sen deleted his Facebook account, which had approximately 14 million followers, hours after Meta's oversight board ruled that he should face a six-month ban from the platform over a video post in which he threatened to have opponents beaten. On the following day, 30 June 2023, the Cambodian Ministry of Post and Telecommunications announced that Hun Sen has switched his main platform to Telegram, and they would deport a Meta representative immediately and Cambodia would cease all cooperation with the company, attributing the move to an abundance of fake accounts, data risks, and lack of transparency. On 4 July 2023, the Ministry of Foreign Affairs issued a statement that all of Meta's Oversight Board's 22 members were "persona non-grata", barring them from entering the country because "[t]he recommendation of the Oversight Board to Meta Platforms Inc. to temporarily suspend the official Facebook page belonging to Cambodian prime minister Hun Sen is political in nature. It intends to obstruct the freedom of the press for the citizens of Cambodia and the right to receive credible news from a leader whom they support and admire."

== Personal life ==
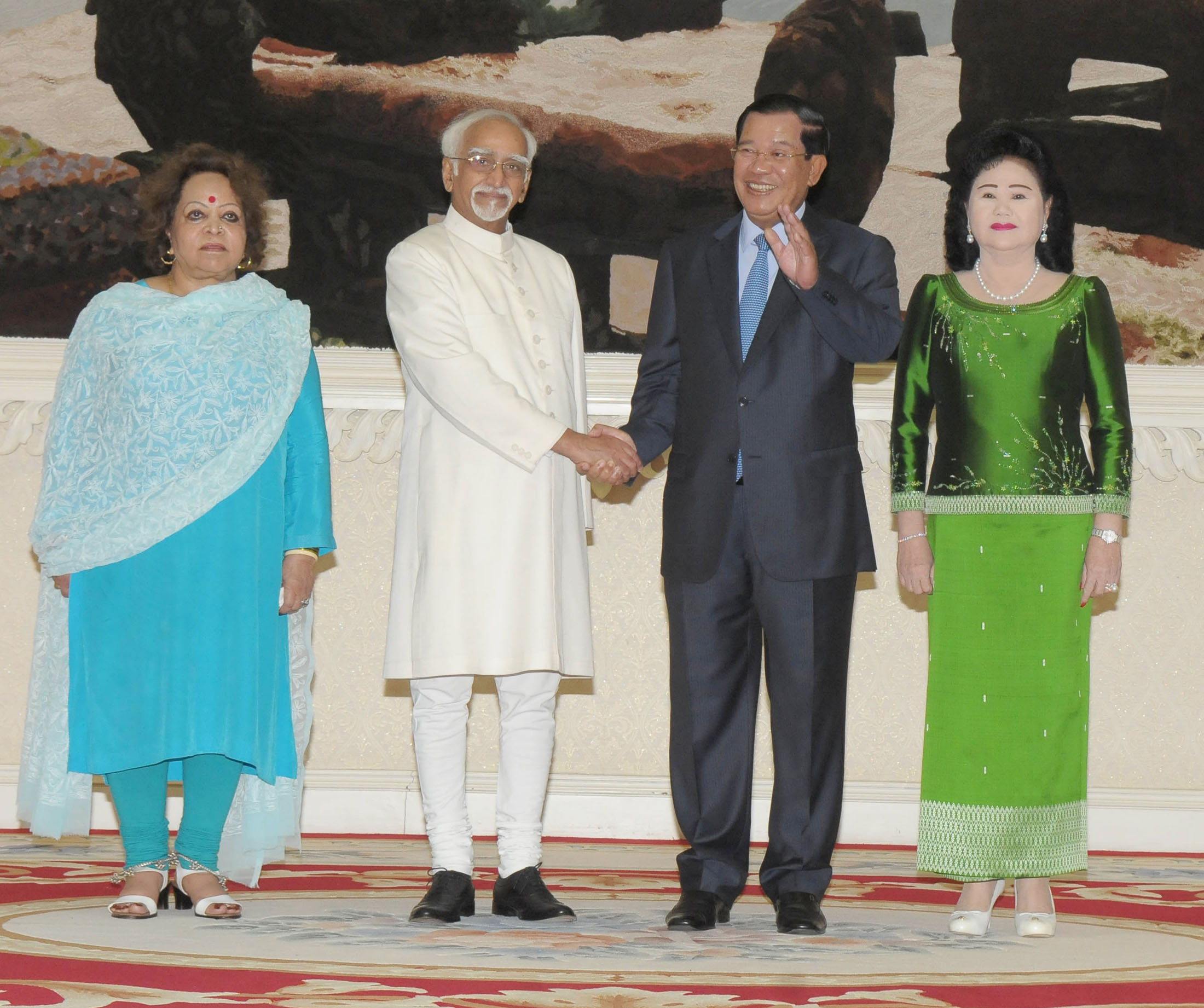
Hun Sen and his wife Bun Rany at the ceremonial reception of the then Vice President of India at Peace Palace, Phnom Penh

Hun Sen is married to Bun Rany. They have 6 children, including one adopted daughter: Kamsot (deceased), Manet, Mana, Manith, Mani and Mali. The couple also adopted a daughter (who is not named in news media sources) in 1988, but they legally disowned her in 2007 for being lesbian. In 2010, Manet was promoted Major General in the Royal Cambodian Armed Forces (RCAF) and became the Deputy Commander of the Prime Minister's Body Guard headquarters. All three of Hun Sen's sons play big roles in his government. His older brother, Hun Neng, was a governor of Kampong Cham and a member of parliament. His nephew, Cambodian businessman Hun To, has been identified as a director of Huione Pay within Huione Group. Australian media coverage and an Australian parliamentary speech alleged that Hun To was suspected by Australian authorities of involvement in heroin trafficking and money laundering linked to Operation Illipango; he denied involvement in trafficking and money laundering.

Hun Sen is fluent in Vietnamese, in addition to his native Khmer. Hun Sen also speaks some English after beginning to learn the language in the 1990s, but usually converses in Khmer through interpreters when giving formal interviews to the English-speaking media.

Hun Sen is blind in one eye because of an injury he sustained during the 1975 fall of Phnom Penh while fighting for the Khmer Rouge. He is fitted with a Japanese made artificial eye, which is regularly replaced by Japanese doctors.

Hun Sen is a Buddhist. He has made major donations for the renovation of numerous pagodas, including Wat Vihear Suor.

Until June 2022, Hun Sen has used 4 April 1951 as his legal birthdate even if he was actually born on 5 August 1952. He had it changed due to a Cambodian superstition relating to having wrong legal birthdates causing conflict with the Chinese zodiac. A lot of Cambodians use two birthdates due to losing their birth certificates during the Khmer Rouge era of the 1970s. Hun Sen had it changed for believing the death of his brother in May 2022 due to a cardiac arrest was related to this superstition since he also had an incorrect birth date.

== Honours ==
National Orders:

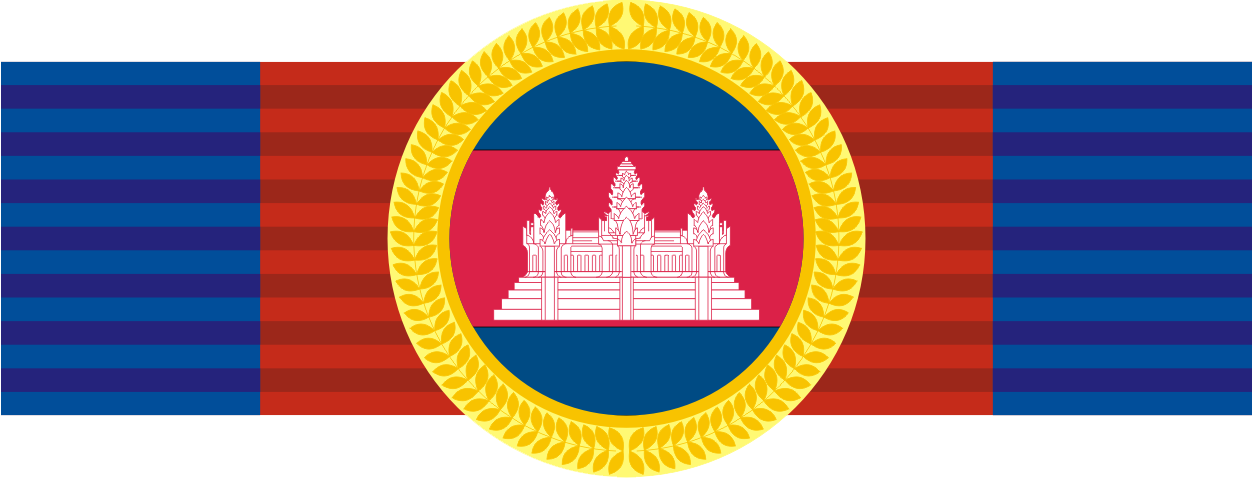
- Grand Order of National Merit (1996)
- Grand Cross of the Royal Order of Cambodia
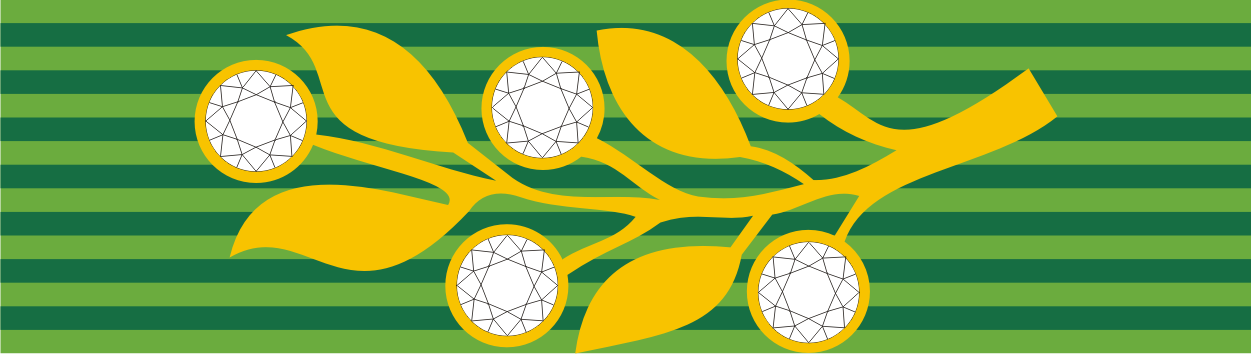
- Grand Cross of the Royal Order of Sowathara
- Grand Cross of the Royal Order of Monisaraphon
- Sena Jayaseddh Medal
- Medal of National Defense, with 2 gold stars
- Medal of National Defense, with 2 silver stars
- Medal of National Defense, with 2 bronze stars
- Medal of Labour
- National Construction Decoration

Foreign Orders:

- Brunei:
  - Recipient of the Sultan of Brunei Golden Jubilee Medal (2017)
- Cuba:
  - Recipients of the Order of José Martí (1999)
- Laos:
  - Gold Medal of the Nation (2008)
  - Order of Phoxay Lane Xang (2023)
- Philippines:
  - Grand Cross (Datu) of the Order of Sikatuna
- Russia:
  - Recipients of the Order of Friendship (2021)
- Thailand:
  - Knight Special Grand Cordon of the Order of the White Elephant (2001)
- Ukraine:
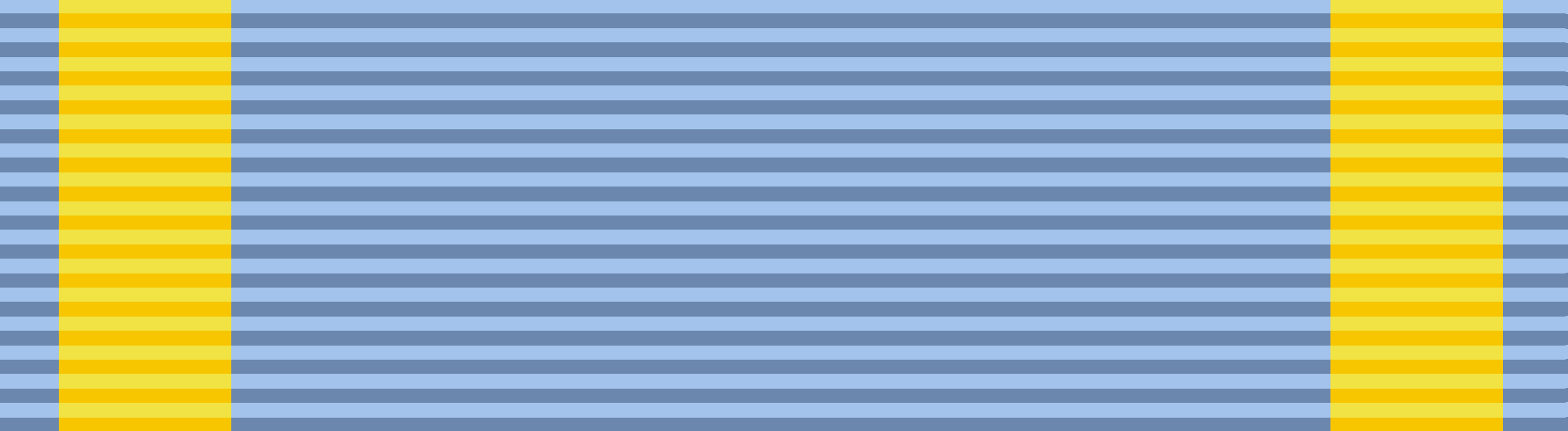
  - Member 3rd Class of the Order of Prince Yaroslav the Wise (Awarded by Volodymyr Zelenskyy, 30 December 2022)

== See also ==
- Modern Cambodia
- Politics of Cambodia
- People's Republic of Kampuchea
- Kleptocracy
- Corruption

== Footnotes ==
=== References ===
Political offices
Preceded by Chan Sy	Prime Minister of Cambodia; 1985–1993	Succeeded by Norodom Ranariddh
New office	Second Prime Minister of Cambodia; Served alongside: Norodom Ranariddh, Ung Huot; 1993–1998	Position abolished
Preceded by Ung Huot	Prime Minister of Cambodia; 1998–2023	Succeeded by Hun Manet
Preceded by Kong Korm	Minister of Foreign Affairs; 1987–1990	Succeeded by Hor Namhong
Preceded by Ieng Sary	Minister of Foreign Affairs; 1979–1986	Succeeded by Kong Korm
Party political offices
Preceded by Chea Sim	President of the Cambodian People's Party; 2015–present	Incumbent
Party political offices
Preceded by Chea Sim	Leader of the Cambodian People's Party; 1985–present	Incumbent
Diplomatic posts
Preceded by Hassanal Bolkiah	Chairperson of ASEAN; 2002	Succeeded by Megawati Sukarnoputri
Preceded by Susilo Bambang Yudhoyono	Chairperson of ASEAN; 2012	Succeeded by Hassanal Bolkiah
Preceded by Hassanal Bolkiah	Chairperson of ASEAN; 2022	Succeeded by Joko Widodo
