= Preaek Prasab district =

Preaek Prasab ព្រែកប្រសព្វ
- District (srok)
- Interactive map of Preaek Prasab
- Country: Cambodia
- Province: Kratié
- Communes: 8
- Villages: 47

Population (1998)
  - Total: 56,757
- Time zone: +7
- Geocode: 1003

Preaek Prasab (Khmer: ព្រែកប្រសព្វ), lit. 'Canal junction'is a district located in Kratié province, in Cambodia. Chambok is a commune in Preaek Prasab district. There is a mountain, Soporkaley, nearby with views of the Mekong River. There is a high school near the mountain.

== Communes and villages ==
Khum (commune)	Phum (villages)
Chambak	Chambak Ti Muoy, Chambak Ti Pir, Chrouy Ampil Ti Muoy, Chrouy Ampil Ti Pir, Chrouy Thma, Stueng Thum
Chrouy Banteay	Chrouy Banteay, Kampong Dar, Kaeng, Khsach Tob, L'iet, Roka Thum, Tuol Prich
Kampong Kor	Chrouy Snaeng Krabei Kraom, Chrouy Snaeng Krabei Leu, Kampong Kor, Ta Mau Leu
Kaoh Ta Suy	Chong Kaoh, Kandal Kaoh, Kbal Kaoh
Preaek Prasab	Boeng Leach, Dei Doh Kraom, Dei Doh Leu, Ou Lung, Preaek Prang, Preaek Prasab Kandal, Preaek Prasab Kraom, Preaek Prasab Leu, Preaek Ku, Thma Reab
Ruessei Keo	Boeng Rey, Ruessei Kaev, Sralau Damnak, Svay Chum
Saob	Boeng Chraeng, Khla, Preaek Chik, Preaek Prolung, Preaek Roka, Saob Kraom, Saob Leu
Ta Mau	Kraham Ka Leu, Kraham Ka Kraom, Khsat, Preaek Svay, Stueng Tro, Ta Mau Kandal, Ta Mau Kraom
